= Saba Qamar filmography =

List of films and television series of Pakistani actress Saba Qamar

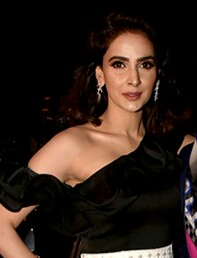
- Qamar at Masala Awards 2017
- Film: 6
- Television series: 91
- Web series: 4
- Hosting: 8
- Music videos: 8

Saba Qamar is a Pakistani actress who works predominantly in Urdu films and television. Qamar started her career with PTV Home's classic television series Main Aurat Hoon in 2004. She made her Lollywood debut with Sarmad Khoosat's directorial film Manto in 2015 and Bollywood debut with Saket Chaudhary's directorial film Hindi Medium in 2017.

Key
†	Denotes films/dramas/series that have not been released yet

== Films ==
Year	Title	Role	Director	Notes	Ref.
2015	Manto	Noor Jehan	Sarmad Khoosat	Debut film	
2016	Lahore Se Aagey	Tara Ahmed	Wajahat Rauf		
2016	8969	Zara Nawazish	Azeem Sajjad		
2017	Hindi Medium	Mita Batra	Saket Chaudhary	Hindi film	
2018	Moomal Rano	Nigar	Siraj-ul-Haque	Short film	
2020	Sikka	Narrator	Ahmed Sarym	Short film	
2022	Ghabrana Nahi Hai	Zubeda	Saqib Khan		
2022	Kamli	Hina	Sarmad Khoosat		

== Television ==
Year	Title	Role	Notes	Ref.
2004	Main Aurat Hoon	Rubina	Acting Debut	
2005	Chaap	Iram Aftab		
2005	Sussar In Law	Tania		
2006	Gharoor	Sadia		
2006	Dhoop Mein Andhera Hai	Zindagi		
2006	Taqdeer	Dua		
2006	Kahin Tum Kahin Hum	Mehru		
2006	Phool	Kiran		
2006	Banjar	Roshni		
2006	Aqal Bari Ya Bhains	Humaira		
2007	Khuda Gawah	Sonia		
2007	Muhabbat Ab Nahi Hogi	Silah		
2007	No.1	Annie Zaidi		
2007	Mammo	Salma		
2007	Un Biyan Able	Rania		
2007	Mirch Masala	Saman		
2008	Woh Subh Kab Ayegi	Manahil		
2008	Not Responding	Shafaq Absar		
2008	Nawab Manzil	Iffat		
2008	Daur	Maham		
2008	Chubhan	Urooj		
2008	Bint e Adam	Zainab		
2008	Phool Aur Kantey	Simi		
2008	Na Janay Kyun	Roohi		
2009	Teri Ik Nazar	Nida		
2009	Nadia Naam Ki Larki	Nadia		
2009	Jinnah Ke Naam	Ruqsana Inayatullah		
2009	Tinkay	Iman Anwar		
2009	Hum Tu Karain Kamal	Nazia		
2009	Mishaal	Fatima Mansoor		
2009	Muhabbat Yun Bhi Hoti Hai	Ghazal Kabir		
2009	Half Light	Aiza		
2010
2010	Lahore Junction	Saira		
2010	Dastaan	Surraiya Saleem		
2010	Kanpur Se Katas Tak	Pooja Mohan Das		
2010	Ghao	Mehr-un-Nisa		
2010	Amar Bel	Bakhshan		
2010	Rait Kay Dairay	Asma		
2010	Uraan	Ayesha Aleem		
2010	Aankh Salamat Andhay Log	Amara		
2011	Pani Jaisa Piyar	Sana		
2011	Main Chand Si	Irsa		
2011	Maat	Saman		
2011	Ghar Ki Baat Hai	Semi Amjad Saleem		
2011	Tera Pyar Nahi Bhoole	Zartash		
2011	Khalida Ki Walida	Khalida		
2011	Mein Aisa Kiun Hoon	Nida		
2011	Two In One	Sonia Mansoor		
2011	Nazar	Katrina		
2011	Jo Chale To Jaan Se Guzar Gaye	Zufishan		
2012	Thakan	Sadaf		
2012	Bhool	Surraiya		
2012	Yahan Pyar Nahin Hai	Haleema		
2012	Shikwa Na Shikayat	Meerub Rehman		
2012	Shehryar Shehzadi	Sarwat		
2012	Na Kaho Tum Mere Nahi	Mehreen		
2013	Kaash Aisa Ho	Irfa		
2013	Ullu Baraye Farokht Nahi	Gul-e-Rana		
2013	Miss Fire	Maya		
2013	Sannata	Rukayya		
2013	Bunty I Love You	Dania		
2014	Jaanam	Falak Taseer		
2014	Izteraab	Zara		
2014	Bay Emaan Mohabbat	Dania		
2014	Na Katro Pankh Mere	Naamia Imad Alam		
2014	Digest Writer	Farida Anwar/Rashk-e-Hina		
2015	Kaisay Tum Se Kahoon	Anamta		
2015	S.H.E	Bajirao Mastani		
2015	Sangat	Ayesha		
2016	Mein Sitara	Surraiya/Sitara (Note: Qamar played dual roles in the drama.)		
2016	Besharam	Mishal Tahir Malik		
2017	Baaghi	Fouzia Azeem/Kanwal Baloch		
2017	Manto	Noor Jehan		
2019	Cheekh	Mannat Shayan Taseer		
2022	Fraud	Maya Nisar		
2023	Sar-e-Rah	Rania	Mini Series	
2023	Gunah	Gul Meher	Mini Series	
2023	Tumharay Husn Kay Naam	Salma Qureshi		
2023	Serial Killer	Sarah Sikandar		
2024	Pagal Khana	Noor-e-Saba		
2025	Case No. 9	Sehar Moazzam		
2025	Pamaal	Malika Riaz		
2025	Muamma	Jahan Ara		

=== Special appearance ===
Year	Title	Role	Network	Notes	Ref.
2005	Jag Beeti	Erum	PTV Home	Episode "Faisla"	
2005	Hera Pheri and Company	Sonia	PTV Home	Episodes 40, 41	
2010	Talluq	Naila Habib	Geo Entertainment	Episode "17"	
2011	Faseel-e-Jaan Se Aagay	Neelofar	PTV Home	Episode "Matti Ka Qarz"	
2012	Timmy G	Herself	ARY Digital	Episode "77"	
2014	Shareek-e-Hayat	Recurring	Hum TV	Anthology series	

=== Other appearances ===
Year	Title	Role	Notes
2009	The Shareef Show Mubarak Ho	Herself	Guest appearance
2014	Tonite with HSY	Herself	Guest appearance with Adnan Siddiqui
2014	Mazaaq Raat	Herself	Guest appearance with Humayun Saeed
2023	Mazaaq Raat	Herself	Season 2 (Ep 7)

== Telefilms ==
Year	Title	Role	Network	Ref.
2004	Ishq	Saba	Geo Entertainment	
2005	Bujhay Charagh Talay	Annie	ATV	
2006	Kal	Sana Hamdani	PTV Home	
2006	Apno Ka Sath	Aiza	PTV Home	
2007	Dil Se Shikayat Hai	Sara	ATV	
2011	Balay Ki Bali	Vaneeza	Hum TV	
2012	Pyar Mein Twins	Sara	Ary Digital	
2012	Love Ki Khichdi	Fiza	Ary Digital	
2013	Aaina	Aliya Javaid	Geo Films	
2018	Dil Diyan Gallan	Raniya	Hum TV	
2018	Is Dil Ki Aisi Ki Taisi	Samaira	Hum TV	
2021	Hangor S-131	Naheed Ahmad Tasnim	ARY Digital	
2025	Mohabbat Youn Bhi Honi Thi	Abrish	Hum TV	

== Web series ==
Year	Title	Role	Platform	Notes	Ref.
2022	Naina Ki Sharafat	Naina/Musarat Jahan	UrduFlix	Urduflix original	
2022	Mrs. & Mr. Shameem	Umaina/Ummi	ZEE5	Web series	
2023	Yehi Waqt Hai	Herself	Pakistan Polio Eradication Programme	YouTube Mini Series on Polio	
TBA	Mandi †	Uzma Rana	TBA	Web series	

== Music videos ==
Year	Title	Singer	Ref.
2004	Boliyan	Abrar-ul-Haq	
2004	Mere Shauq Da	Sabir Mirza	
2018	Jeevan Daan	Shuja Haider	
2018	Funn Mitti Se	Shuja Haider	
2020	Qubool	Bilal Saeed	
2021	Chingariyan	Mustafa Zahid	
2021	Begum Shak Karti Hai	Abrar ul Haq	
2022	Kabhi Mai Kabhi Tum	Asim Azhar	

== Hosting ==
Year	Title	Network	Notes	Ref.
2009-2010	Tehzeeb	PTV Home		
2009–2013, 2015	Hum Sub Umeed Se Hain	Geo Entertainment	Political satirical show	
2012	11th Lux Style Awards	ARY Digital	Hosted with Ahmed Ali Butt	
2012	17th PTV Awards	PTV Home	Hosted with Imran Abbas	
2017	Eid Show With Saba Qamar and Imran Abbas	Dunya News	Hosted with Imran Abbas	
2017	Hum Style Awards 2017	Hum TV	Hosted with Farhan Saeed and Ali Kazmi	
2019	18th Lux Style Awards	Geo Entertainment	Hosted with Yasir Hussain	
2023	22nd Lux Style Awards	Hum TV	Hosted with Fahad Mustafa	

== See also ==
- Awards and nominations received by Saba Qamar
