= List of awards and nominations received by Saba Qamar =

Saba Qamar awards and nominations
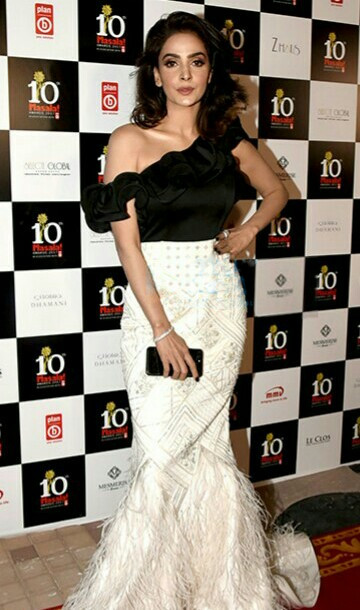
- Qamar at Masala Awards 2017
Awards and nominations
Award	Wins	Nominations
Lux Style Awards	2	15
Hum Awards	1	11
PTV Awards	3	6
Filmfare Awards	0	1
IPPA Awards	2	6
Others	13	26

Totals (Note: Certain award groups do not simply award one winner. They acknowledge several different recipients, have runners-up, and have third place. Since this is a specific recognition and is different from losing an award, runner-up mentions are considered wins in this award tally. For simplification and to avoid errors, each award in this list has been presumed to have had a prior nomination.)
- Wins: 21
- Nominations: 65
- Honours: 2

Saba Qamar is a Pakistani actress works predominantly in Urdu films and television. She is a recipient of 21 accolades throughout her career which includes two Lux Style Awards, three PTV Awards, Hum Award, Nigar Award and Filmfare Award nomination. Government of Pakistan honoured her with Tamgha-e-Imtiaz in 2012 and Pride of Performance in 2016.

== Lux Style Awards ==
The Lux Style Awards is an award ceremony which has been held annually in Pakistan since 2002. Qamar is one of the most nominated actress, winning two awards from fifteen nominations.

Year	Project	Category	Result	Ref(s)
2010	Jinnah Ke Naam	Best Television Actress	Nominated	
2011	Tinkay	Best Television Actress	Nominated	
2012	Tera Pyar Nahi Bhoole	Best Television Actress	Nominated	
2012	Pani Jaisa Pyar	Best Television Actress (Satellite)	Nominated	
2013	Maat	Best Television Actress (Satellite)	Nominated	
2015	Sannata	Best Television Actress	Nominated	
2017	Mein Sitara	Best Television Actress	Nominated	
2017	Besharam	Best Television Actress	Nominated	
2017	Lahore Se Aagey	Best Lead Actress in a Film	Nominated	
2018	Baaghi	Best Television Actress	Won	
2020	Cheekh	Best Television Actress (Critics choice)	Nominated	
2020	Cheekh	Best Television Actress (Viewers choice)	Nominated	
2023	Kamli	Best Film Actress	Won	
2024	Tumharey Husn Kay Naam	Best TV Actor Female (Viewers choice)	Nominated	
2024	Tumharey Husn Kay Naam	Best TV Actor Female (Critics choice)	Nominated	

== Hum Awards ==
Hum Awards are annual Pakistani accolades bestowed by the Hum Network Limited in recognition of excellence in programming of television, fashion and music industry of Pakistan. Qamar has won only one award from eleven nominations.

Year	Project	Category	Result	Ref(s)
2013	Yahan Pyar Nahin Hai	Best Actress	Nominated	
2013	Maat	Best Actress	Nominated	
2014	Ullu Baraye Farokht Nahi	Best Actress	Nominated	
2014	Ullu Baraye Farokht Nahi	Best Actress (Popular)	Nominated	
2015	Bunty I Love You	Best Actress	Won	
2015	Bunty I Love You	Best Actress (Popular)	Nominated	
2015	Bunty I Love You	Most Impactful Character	Nominated	
2015	Digest Writer	Best Actress	Nominated	
2015	Digest Writer	Best Actress (Popular)	Nominated	
2016	Sangat	Best Actress (Popular)	Nominated	
2016	Sangat	Best Actress	Nominated	

== PTV Awards ==
PTV Awards was an awards ceremony annually held by the Pakistan Television Corporation. The awards were first introduced in the late 1970s to encourage talented people in Pakistan. Qamar has won three awards from six nominations.

Year	Project	Category	Result	Ref(s)
2010	Jinnah Ke Naam	Best Actress (Jury)	Nominated	
2010	Jinnah Ke Naam	Best Actress (Viewers)	Nominated	
2011	Tinkay	Best Actress (Jury)	Won	
2011	Tinkay	Best Actress (Viewers)	Won	
2012	Tera Pyar Nahi Bhoole	Best Actress (Jury)	Won	
2012	Tera Pyar Nahi Bhoole	Best Actress (Viewers)	Nominated	

== Pakistan Media Awards ==
The Pakistan Media Awards, commonly known as The PMA, These are a set of awards given annually for radio, TV, film, and theatre achievements. Qamar has received two awards.

Year	Project	Category	Result	Ref(s)
2011	Dastaan	Best Supporting Actress	Won	
2012	Maat	Best Actress	Won	

== Filmfare Awards ==
The Filmfare Awards are presented annually by The Times Group for excellence of cinematic achievements in Hindi cinema. Qamar has received one nomination.

Year	Project	Category	Result	Ref(s)
2018	Hindi Medium	Best Actress	Nominated	

== Tarang Housefull Awards ==
Tarang Housefull Awards were conducted in 2013. Qamar has received two nominations.

Year	Project	Category	Result	Ref(s)
2013	Aina	Best Actress	Nominated	
2013	Aina	Best On-Screen Couple	Nominated	

== ARY Film Awards ==
The ARY Film Awards commonly known as The AFA's, is an annual Pakistani awards ceremony honoring the cinematic achievements of film industry. Qamar has received one nomination.

Year	Project	Category	Result	Ref(s)
2016	Manto	Best Supporting Actress	Nominated	

== Nigar Awards ==
The Nigar Awards were presented in an annual award show to recognize outstanding achievement in Pakistani cinema. The honors are awarded by Nigar Magazine founded in 1948. The Nigar Awards are Pakistan's version of the Academy Awards. Qamar has received one award.

Year	Project	Category	Result	Ref(s)
2017	Lahore Se Aagey	Best Actress	Won	

== IPPA Awards ==
Qamar has won two awards from six nominations at IPPA Awards.

Year	Project	Category	Result	Ref(s)
2017	Lahore Se Aagey	Best Actress Film	Nominated	
2017	Besharam	Best Actress	Won	
2017	Besharam	Best Couple (along with Zahid Ahmed)	Nominated	
2018	Baaghi	Best Actor (Female) - Drama	Won	
2018	Baaghi	Best Couple (along with Osman Khalid Butt)	Nominated	
2023	Ghabrana Nahi Hai	Best Female Actress Film	Nominated	

== ARY Viewers Choice Awards ==
Qamar has received one award from two nominations at ARY Viewers Choice Awards.

Year	Project	Category	Result	Ref(s)
2017	Besharam	Best Couple (along with Zahid Ahmed)	Nominated	
2017	Besharam	Best Actress	Won	

== Star Screen Awards ==
Year	Project	Category	Result	Ref(s)
2018	Hindi Medium	Most Promising Newcomer - Female	Nominated	

== Masala! Awards ==
Year	Project	Category	Result	Ref(s)
2018	Hindi Medium	Breakthrough Performance of the Year	Won	
2018	Baaghi	Breakthrough Performance of the Year	Won	

== Bollywood Film Journalist's Awards ==
Year	Project	Category	Result	Ref(s)
2018	Hindi Medium	Best Female Debut	Won	

== National Icon Awards ==
Year	Project	Category	Result	Ref(s)
2018	—N/a	Icon of the Year	Won	

== Pakistan International Screen Awards ==
The Pakistan International Screen Awards also known as PISA, is an annual award ceremony that honours excellence in Pakistani television, film, fashion, music and digital industry. Qamar has received two nominations.

Year	Project	Category	Result	Ref(s)
2020	Cheekh	Best Television Actress- Viewers Choice	Nominated	
2020	Cheekh	Best Television Actress- Critics Choice	Nominated	

== Kya Drama Hai Icon Awards ==
Year	Project	Category	Result	Ref(s)
2023	Sar-e-Rah	Best Actress (Mini-series)	Nominated	
2023	Gunah	Outstanding Negative Roles (Miniseries)	Nominated	

== Indus Valley International Film Festival ==
Year	Project	Category	Result	Ref(s)
2022	Kamli	Best Female Actor	Won	

== Pakistan Cinema Awards ==
Year	Project	Category	Result	Ref(s)
2022	Kamli	Best Actress	Won	

== Sunday Special Icon Awards ==
Year	Project	Category	Result	Ref(s)
2022	Kamli	Best Actress of the Year	Won	
2022	Fraud	Best Actress	Nominated	
2026	Case No. 9	Best Actress	Nominated	

== Minsk International Film Festival Listapad ==
Listapad, also known as Minsk International Film Festival (MIFF) or Minsk International Film Festival Listapad, is an annual film festival which takes place in November in Minsk, Belarus. It is the largest such festival in Belarus. Qamar has won one award.

Year	Project	Category	Result	Ref(s)
2022	Kamli	Best Actress	Won	

== USAID Awards ==
For outstanding contribution to USAID funded drama, Qamar received best actress award from USAID.

Year	Project	Category	Result	Ref(s)
2023	Sar-e-Rah	Outstanding Contribution to USAID-Funded Drama	Won	

== Hum Style Awards ==
At Hum Style Awards 2024, Qamar received two nominations.

Year	Project	Category	Result	Ref(s)
2024	—N/a	Most Stylish Actor Television - Female	Nominated	
2024	—N/a	Most Stylish Actor Film - Female	Nominated	

== Other recognitions ==
Year	Title	Category	Ref(s)
2012	Tamgha-e-Imtiaz	Contribution to arts	
2016	Pride of Performance	Contribution to arts	
2017	Eastern Eye	Top Bollywood Debutante	
2018	Daily Times Pakistan	Pride of Pakistan	
2021	Hello Magazine Awards	All Time Favorite Superstar	
2022	The 'Random Year That Was 2022' Gloss Etc Awards	Star of the Year Award	
2024	Hello Magazine Awards	Hello Hot 100 Torchbearer	
2024	Sunday Times	Face of the Year	
2025	Hello Magazine Awards	Hello Hot 100 Trailblazer	
2025	The 'Random Year That Was 2025' Gloss Etc Awards	Best Actress Award	
