= Mein Sitara =

- Title screen
- Genre: Period drama
- Written by: Faiza Iftikhar
- Directed by: Seema Tahir Khan
- Starring: Saba Qamar; Mikaal Zulfiqar; Meera; Anum Fayyaz; Noman Ijaz; Ayesha Gul
- Theme music composer: Waqar Ali
- Opening theme: "Mein Sitara" by Rahat Fateh Ali Khan
- Country of origin: Pakistan
- Original language: Urdu
- No. of seasons: 2
- No. of episodes: 31

Production
- Producer: Seema Tahir Khan
- Production location: Karachi
- Editor: Arbab Khan
- Camera setup: Multi-camera setup
- Production company: TV One Productions

Original release
- Network: TV One Pakistan
- Release: 17 March – 3 November 2016

Mein Sitara is a 2016 Pakistani television series that aired on TV One. The series was written by Faiza Iftikhar, directed by Seema Tahir Khan, and produced by TV One Productions. It had an ensemble cast including Saba Qamar, Mikaal Zulfiqar, Meera, Hassan Ahmed, Anum Fayyaz, Noman Ijaz, and Rashid Farooqui. The serial marked the fourth on-screen collaboration of Saba Qamar and Mikaal Zulfiqar after Pani Jaisa Piyar (2011), Izteraab (2014), and Sangat (2015). Set in the mid-1960s, the series follows the fortunes of characters from Lollywood's golden era and their tremulous journey till the turn of the 20th century.

At the 16th Lux Style Awards, the series received two nominations, best television play and best actress for Qamar.

== Plot ==
It is based on the life and situations of actors and directors of the film industry. Sitara (Saba Qamar)'s character in particular was inspired from one of the most renowned actresses of the film industry. Sitara is a poor girl who makes it big in the industry. The series showed what really goes on behind the scenes and how sometimes actresses have to fight many difficulties at the same time. It is a story of friendship, dreams, love, despair, hope and an emotional journey spanning 3 decades of the film industry.

== Cast ==
- Saba Qamar as Surraiya/Sitara
- Mikaal Zulfiqar as Farhad Sethi
- Meera as Naseem Dilruba
- Noman Ijaz as Ilyas Khawaja
- Anum Fayyaz as Falak
- Rashid Farooqui
- Hassan Ahmed as Jamal
- Ayesha Gul as Jharna
- Sara Gul
- Rija Ali
- Faiza Ali

== Soundtrack ==
Mein Sitara

Soundtrack album by Rahat Fateh Ali Khan
- Released: 2016
- Recorded: 2016
- Genre: Television soundtrack
- Length: (3:23)
- Language: Urdu
- Label: TVOne Pakistan

Music video
- "Mein Sitara" OST on YouTube

The theme song was composed by Waqar Ali and sung by Rahat Fateh Ali Khan. The lyricist was Khalil Ullah Farooqui and the music video was released in 2016.

== Production ==
In February 2016, writer Faiza Iftikhar revealed that her upcoming television series titled Nigar Khana is about the heydays of the Pakistani film industry and will star Saba Qamar and Mikaal Zukfiqar.

== Reception ==
In a review of first four episodes, a The Friday Times-based reviewer praised the series for its bold and realistic portrayal of the Pakistani film industry in the 1960s and 1970s, the risky subject matter, intelligent writing, and the nuanced depiction of relationships and societal changes, and acting performances of the actors particularly Aisha Gul and Mikaal Zulfiqar, but criticized it for the lackadaisical editing, overlong dance sequences, and too many songs.

== Accolades ==
Award	Category	Recipients	Result	Ref.
16th Lux Style Awards	Best Television Play	Mein Sitara	Nominated	
16th Lux Style Awards	Best Television Actress	Saba Qamar	Nominated	
