= Mikaal Zulfiqar =

British-Pakistani actor and model (born 1981)

- مکال ذالفقار
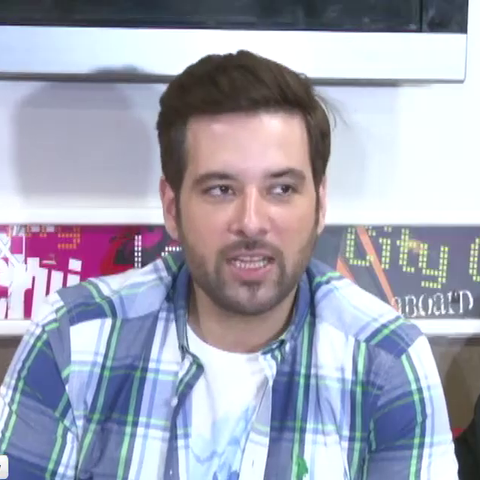
- Zulfiqar in 2018
- Born: Muhammad Mikaal Patras Zulfiqar; 5 September 1981 (age 44); London, England
- Occupations: Actor, model
- Years active: 2000–present
- Agent: https://astservices.tech
- Spouse: Sara Bhatti (m. 2012; div. 2017)
- Children: 2
- Website: https://astservices.tech

Mian Mikaal Patras Zulfiqar (born 5 September 1981), commonly known as Mikaal Zulfiqar (Urdu: مکال ذوالفقار), is a British-Pakistani actor and former model. He has appeared in a number of Pakistani television series. He has also acted in a few Indian films and is currently active in Pakistani films. He is one of the highest paid Pakistani actors. In 2015, he won the Best Actor (Popular) Award at Hum TV Awards due to his performance in the television series Mohabat Subh Ka Sitara Hai.

Born in London, he moved to Pakistan and initially began his career as a model in the early 2000s and caught the attention of the team of Abrar-ul-Haq, who cast him in the singer's music video for Sanu Tere Naal Pyar Ho Gya. He made his film debut in 2007 with the Bollywood crime thriller film Godfather, followed by starring roles in Shoot on Sight (2008), U R My Jaan (2011), and Baby (2015). He also began his film career in Pakistan with a supporting character in the critically acclaimed film Cake (2018). Zulfiqar has since played leading roles in Na Band Na Baraati (2018) and Sherdil (2019).

He entered the Pakistani television industry with the drama series Saiqa (2009). The hit series Pani Jaisa Piyar (2011) stabilized his position in the television medium, and he went on to appear in a number of big-budget dramas, with the most notable being Shehr-e-Zaat (2012), Saat Pardon Mein (2012), Mirat-ul-Uroos (2012–2013), Mohabat Subh Ka Sitara Hai (2013–2014), Diyar-e-Dil (2015), Sang-e-Mar Mar (2016–2017), and Alif Allah Aur Insaan (2017–2018).

== Early life ==
Zulfiqar was born on 5 September 1981 in London, United Kingdom, and has six siblings. After spending his early years in London, he moved to Pakistan and attended the Lahore Lyceum School in Lahore. Additionally, he also began his career as a model and started modelling for commercials and videos that were relevant to acting.

== Career ==
After several advertising campaigns, Zulfiqar appeared in Sanu Tere Naal Pyar Ho Gya, a song from the Bay Ja Cycle Tay music album by Abrar-ul-Haq.

Zulfiqar is known for his appearance in comedy commercials for Ufone. He has also performed in Bollywood films;the crime thriller film Godfather in 2007, the drama film Shoot on Sight in 2008, the musical-romantic U R My Jaan in 2011, and the spy thriller Baby in 2015. However, in an interview, he stated that he didn't dream of working in Bollywood further.

After having a successful career in modelling, Zulfiqar stepped into the television industry. Some of his early screenwork includes Saiqa, Kaisay Kahoon, Pani Jaisa Piyar, and Jal Pari, among others.

He won the Best Actor title in the Hum TV Awards held in Dubai in April, 2015, for his role in the drama serial Mohabat Subh Ka Sitara Hai. He also acted in the popular show Shehr-e-Zaat opposite Mahira Khan. He has performed in many dramas opposite actress Saba Qamar as protagonist, including Pani Jaisa Piyar, Sangat, and Mein Sitara.

In 2015, he played the role of Behroz Bakhtiyar Khan in the romantic drama Diyar-e-Dil. Dawn praised Zulfiqar's performance and wrote, "Meekal has finally chosen a role with depth as Behroz after a series of pot boilers. He looks amazing and reminds viewers again that he is the talented actor who could play the devil-may-care Shamraiz from Kuch Pyar ka Pagalpan or the self-absorbed, brooding Salman Ansar from Sheher-e-Zaat." Diyar-e-Dil was also well received by viewers.

In 2017, he was highly appreciated for his performance in the spiritual television series Alif Allah Aur Insaan. The series became one of the most-watched shows of 2017.

In March 2018, he made a special appearance in the film Cake, co-starring Aamina Sheikh, Adnan Malik, and Sanam Saeed. The film was highly praised by critics. His next film Na Band Na Baraati was released in June 2018. He said in an interview that doing that film was his way to support foreign investment in local cinema.

In 2019, he was seen in Pakistani war film Sherdil opposite Armeena Khan. The film and Zulfiqar's performance received mostly unfavourable reviews from critics. Nevertheless, the film became Zulfiqar's first major box-office success, and grossed Rs. 5.17 crore in the first five days of its release.

== Personal life ==
Mikaal's full birth name is Mian Muhammad Mikaal Patras Aziz Zulfiqar. His father is a retired Pakistani diplomat, and his mother is British. His parents separated when Zulfiqar was 17 years old. He has two older sisters, one of whom lives in Australia, and a younger brother, Jamal Andreas Zulfiqar, who is a prominent theatre actor in London.

Mikaal's first relationship was with Pakistani film actress Zara Sheikh. Zulfiqar got engaged to model Sara Bhatti in 2010. They got married in 2012 and have two daughters. In March 2017, Zulfiqar announced on his Facebook page that he and Bhatti had officially divorced.

== Public image ==
Mikaal is listed among the "top 10 most beautiful men of Pakistan". In 2017, he was one of the highest-paid television actors in the country. In 2017, he was one of the most in-demand actors of Pakistani films and was offered a number of films. He signed five films that year.

== Filmography ==
=== Films ===
Year	Title	Role	Refs
2007	Godfather	Abdullah	
2007	Shoot on Sight	Zaheer Khan	
2011	U R My Jaan	Akash	
2013	Abhi Tau Main Jawan Hun	Faisal Quraishi	
2015	Baby	Ashfaq	
2018	Cake	Shaheryar	
2018	Na Band Na Baraati	Shahid	
2019	Sherdil	Haris Mustafa	
2023	Huey Tum Ajnabi	Nizamuddin	
2023	Money Back Guarantee	Irfan Pathan	

=== Television ===
Year	Title	Role	Network	Ref
2009	Saiqa	Tahir		
2010–11	Dil Hai Chota Sa	Amaar		
2010–11	Kaisay Kahoon	Zidaan		
2011	Pani Jaisa Piyar	Adarsh		
2011–2012	Kuch Pyar Ka Pagalpan	Shamraiz		
2011–2012	Jal Pari	Jamshed		
2012	Shehr-e-Zaat	Salman		
2012	Talafi	Ammad		
2012	Man Jali	Taimoor		
2012	Saat Pardon Mein	Ehsan Muraad		
2012	Adha Din Aur Puri Raat	Ali		
2012	Durr-e-Shehwar	Mansoor (young)		
2012	New York Se New Karachi	Rony		
2013–2014	Mirat Ul Uroos	Hammad		
2013–2014	Mujhe Khuda Pe Yaqeen Hai	Shaiq		
2013–2014	Mohabat Subh Ka Sitara Hai	Nabeel		
2013	Kyun Hai Tu	Ali		
2013	Ek Kasak Reh Gayi	Shehriyar		
2014	Izteraab	Jazib		
2014	Laa	Daniyal Malik		
2014	Tum Mere Hi Rehna	Numail		
2015	Diyar-e-Dil	Behroz Khan		
2015	Bay Dar O Deewar Ghar			
2015	Mere Armaan	Ali		
2015–2016	Sangat	Adnan		
2015–2016	Maan	Imaan		
2015–2016	Tum Mere Kya Ho	Ahmar		
2016	Intezaar	Shariq		
2016	Mein Sitara	Farhad Sethi		
2016	Mann Pyasa	Arib		
2016–2017	Sang-e-Mar Mar	Aurangzeb		
2017–2018	Alif Allah Aur Insaan	Shahzeb		
2018	De Ijazat	Shavaiz		
2018	Aakhri Station	Faris		
2018	Khasara	Mutasim		
2019–2020	Ramz-e-Ishq	Rayyan		
2019–2020	Ruswai	Salman		
2020-2021	Qarar	Junaid		
2021	Khwaab Nagar Ki Shehzadi	Sayim	ARY Digital	
2022	Ishq Pagal Karay	Raheel	TV One	
2022	Yeh Ishq Samajh Na Aaye	Hassan	aur Life	
2022	Fraud	Shaan	ARY Digital	
2022	Chauraha	Junaid	Geo Entertainment	
2023	Sar-e-Rah	Amir	ARY Digital	
2023	Jaisay Aapki Marzi	Sheheryar	ARY Digital	
2024	Dil-e-Naadan	Zaviyaar	Geo Entertainment	
2024	Tauba	Kamal Ahmed	Geo Entertainment	
2024	Diyar-e-Yaar	Deebaj	Green Entertainment	
2025	Mohra	Hamza	Geo Entertainment	
2025	Masoom	TBA	Hum TV	

== Awards and nominations ==
Year	Nominated work	Award	Category	Role	Result
2012	Shehr-e-Zaat	Hum Award	Best Actor	Salman Ansar	Nominated
2015	Muhabat Subh Ka Sitara Hai	Hum Award	Best Actor	Nabeel	Won
2016	Diyar-e-Dil	Hum Award	Best Actor	Behroze Bakhtiyar Khan	Won

== See also ==
- List of Lollywood actors
- List of Pakistani male actors
