= Pagal Khana =

2024 Pakistani television series

- Genre: Drama
- Written by: Iqbal Hussain
- Directed by: Iqbal Hussain
- Country of origin: Pakistan
- Original language: Urdu
- No. of seasons: 1

Production
- Production company: Multiverse Entertainment

Original release
- Network: Green Entertainment
- Release: 29 January – 25 June 2024

Pagal Khana is a 2024 Pakistani television series produced by Multiverse Entertainment. It features Saba Qamar, Sami Khan, Syed Jibran, Momal Sheikh, Omair Rana and Adnan Shah Tipu in prominent roles. The series was broadcast on Green Entertainment.

== Plot ==
The series is set in a specialised mental health facility known as Club 11, where a group of patients receive treatment away from a conventional hospital setting. The narrative follows the individuals living at the facility and explores their personal experiences and relationships.

== Cast ==
- Saba Qamar as Noor-e-Saba
- Sami Khan
- Syed Jibran
- Momal Sheikh
- Sonia Mishal
- Mashal Khan
- Faiza Gillani
- Javed Sheikh
- Omair Rana
- Afzal Khan (Jan Rambo)
- Sahiba
- Adnan Shah Tipu
- Babar Ali
- Nadia Hussain
- Laila Zuberi
- Huma Nawab
- Saba Faisal
- Nida Mumtaz
- Hammad Siddiq
- Hassan Shah
- Areeba Trimizi
- Tooba Ansari

== Reception ==
In a February 2024 review, Dawn criticised the series' treatment of mental illness, arguing that the subject was used largely for entertainment and black comedy rather than being approached with sufficient sensitivity. The review also questioned its portrayal of psychotherapy and the experiences of families caring for people with mental health conditions.
