= U R My Jaan =

- Theatrical release poster
- Directed by: Arun Govil
- Screenplay by: Arun Govil
- Produced by: Arun Govil
- Starring: Mikaal Zulfiqar; Preeti Soni; Himani Shivpuri; Anil Dhawan; Rajesh Khera; Aman Verma; Ravi Dubey; Karmveer Choudhary
- Cinematography: Sirsha Ray
- Edited by: Sanjay Ingle
- Music by: Sanjeev Darshan
- Release date: 23 September 2011
- Running time: 145 minutes
- Country: India
- Language: Hindi

U R My Jaan (transl. You are my life) is a 2011 Indian Hindi-language romance film written and directed by Aron Govil. It is a remake of the 1990 movie Pretty Woman. It was released on 23 September 2011.

== Plot ==
U R My Jaan is a love story about Reena (Preeti) and Akash (Mikaal), who are absolute opposites. Reena is a girl from Chandigarh who is a vivacious middle-class girl and nurtures her dream of making it big in Bollywood. Akash, from New York, is a renowned suave and ruthless billionaire who will go to any lengths when it's about his business. They are brought together by fate in Mumbai, and in their brief encounter, they manage to change each other's lives forever.

== Cast ==
- Mikaal Zulfiqar as Akash
- Priti Soni as Reena
- Himani Shivpuri as Reena's Mom
- Anil Dhawan as Reena's Father
- Rajesh Khera as Sandy
- Aman Verma as Rahul
- Abhilasha Das as Priya
- Aishwarya Sakhuja as Nisha
- Nathassha Sikka as Donna
- Vipul Roy as Rajiv
- Partha Sarathi Ray as Parag
- Narendra Jaitley as Ravi
- Sunil Nagar as Rajiv's Dad
- Neha Gupta as Rajiv's Mom
- Karmveer Choudhary as Police Commissioner
- Ravi Dubey as Ashok (Extended Cameo)

== Soundtrack ==
The film's soundtrack is composed by Sanjeev Darshan with lyrics by Sameer.

U R My Jaan

Soundtrack album by Sanjeev Darshan
- Genre: Film soundtrack
- Producer: Aron Govil

=== Track listing ===
No.	Title	Performer(s)	Length
1.	"U R My Jaan"	Sanjeev Rathod, Shilpa Rao	5:16
2.	"Mera Maula Kare"	Roop Kumar Rathod	5:22
3.	"Kya Kare Dil Bechara"	Shaan	4:20
4.	"Bin Tere We Mahi"	Master Saleem, Richa Sharma	5:44
5.	"Mein Zamin pe Hun"	Shreya Ghoshal	4:59
6.	"Chand Wahi Hai"	Javed Ali, Shreya Ghoshal	4:43
