= Fraud (TV series) =

2022 Pakistani TV series by Saqib Khan

- Title card
- Urdu: فراڈ
- Genre: Action serial drama Thriller
- Written by: Zanjabeel Asim Shah
- Screenplay by: Nabeel Nadeem
- Directed by: Saqib Khan
- Starring: Saba Qamar; Ahsan Khan; Mikaal Zulfiqar
- Theme music composer: Octave Studio
- Opening theme: Ali Zafar
- Country of origin: Pakistan
- Original language: Urdu
- No. of seasons: 1
- No. of episodes: 35

Production
- Producer: Abdullah Seja
- Cinematography: Luqman Khan
- Animator: Moshin Habib
- Editor: Rao Ali
- Running time: Approx. 36-45 Minutes
- Production company: iDream Entertainment

Original release
- Network: ARY Digital
- Release: 14 May – 31 December 2022

Fraud is a 2022 Pakistani television drama series written by Zanjabeel Asim Shah, directed by Saqib Khan, and produced by Abdullah Seja under the banner iDream Entertainment. Starring Saba Qamar, Ahsan Khan and Mikaal Zulfiqar in lead roles in their second on-screen appearance together after eleven years, the series is set in Lahore and Karachi. It debuted on ARY Digital on 14 May 2022.

== Plot ==
Nisar dreams of marrying his two daughters, Maya and Maila, to well-off people and fixes Maya's engagement with Tabraiz, who is rich and has a successful family business. Nael, Maya's cousin, really likes Maya and sends a proposal but Nisar turns it down because Nael is not rich. After Tabraiz and Maya's wedding, they both start getting affectionate towards each other. Later, Tabraiz learns that his uncle died, so he and his parents leave Pakistan for a while, leaving Maya at her parents' house.

After no contact with Tabraiz or his parents for more than two weeks, Nisar and Nael file a missing person report with the police for Tabraiz, but after looking at Tabraiz's picture, the police officer tells them that Tabraiz and his parents are actually fraudsters. Tabraiz, whose real name is Shujat, runs a con with his partners where they act as rich people, impress middle-income families, get married and run away with any jewelry and money. Out of grief and guilt, Nisar decides to have Maya marry Nael, but he runs away from the wedding at the last minute because he can't get over how Nisar insulted him earlier.

Meanwhile, Shujat and his partners rob a Punjabi woman named Rehana, but Shujat leaves his partners after not receiving the share he was promised. Shujat then meets Tooba at an ATM stand, and Tooba's driver tells Shujat that Tooba is part of the Shaan Textiles business. Shujat impresses Tooba and they start dating. Tooba is the stepsister of Shaan, and Shaan's wife has trust issues with his stepmother, Kulsoom but since Shan doesn't believe her, they get divorced. Shaan starts taking care of Zimmal when his wife remarries and moves away.

Maya, Nisar and her mother Shehnaz decide to move to Lahore, where Maya gets a job at Shaan Textiles and she meets Kulsoom, who is impressed by Maya. Before moving to Lahore, Maila married officer Talaal, but after Talaal is murdered, Maila moves with her family to Lahore as well. Maya then meets Zimmal, but Shaan tells Maya to stay away from her, as he does not trust women after a few started getting close to Zimmal only to impress him. Later, Tooba and Shujat marry, and Kulsoom decides to get Shaan and Maya married, to which they agree for the sake of their families. It is revealed that Shujat comes from a low-income family, and his father is ill, but he can't make them meet Tooba because he lied to her that his parents died, and his parents are unaware of his fraud business.

Shaan and Maya gradually develop feelings for each other and become close after their marriage. Though Shujat and Maya live in the same house, they do not run into each other for a while and hence are not aware of each other. When they finally do meet, Maya becomes disturbed and shocked while Shujat learns from Tooba about Maya's two failed marriages, the first with Shujat himself and the second with Nael, which never happened. Shujat then threatens Maya to not reveal his truth, or else he will reveal Maya's two failed marriages to Shaan. Shaan was never informed of Maya's part because Kulsoom was afraid that Shaan would not agree to the wedding and Nisar agrees to the condition even though Maya wanted to inform him. Hence, Shujat and Maya do not reveal their past to the rest of the family but Shujat starts blackmailing Maya.

Tired of being threatened by Shujat, Maya informs Kulsoom and Tooba about Shujat, that he was her first husband and a fraud. Shujat tries to defend himself but Tooba breaks down feeling betrayed and sends Shujat away. Shujat goes to Kulsoom and convinces her that he will help her rob Shaan, so Kulsoom brings Shujat back to their house, much to Maya's displeasure. Maya also realizes that Kulsoom and Toobo do not actually love Shaan and only act to get in his good books to acquire his property. Nael wants to redeem himself for not marrying Maya, so he marries Maila. Shujat and Kulsoom then collaborate to rob Shaan. Kulsoom then informs Shaan that Maya was previously married, but Maya tells Shaan that she was married to Shujaat. So Shaan expels both Maya and Shujat from the house.

When Maya tells her parents this, Nisar tells Maya to fight against Shujat, but Tooba and Kulsoom emotionally blackmail Shaan by telling him that Tooba is pregnant with Shujaat's child, so that Kulsoom can continue to rob Shaan with Shujat's help. Shaan then decides to bring Shujat back to their house. Shujat asks for forgiveness from Shaan and Tooba but they brush him off. Shaan takes Zimmal to America to meet Simra, but before that, Shaan gives Kulsoom the power of attorney and ownership of his company. After Shaan returns, he finds out that Kulsoom robbed him, and she tells Shaan that he has nothing now and they have no relationship. Simra calls Shaan and explains that Shaan always portrays women in front of him as bad women, like Maya. Shaan then realizes his mistakes.

Meanwhile, Maya goes to the police to file a complaint against Shujat but the officer says he can't without any proof and later informs Jahanara. Jahanara tells him not to worry. Shujat tries to steal money from Kulsoom for his father's surgery, but after she finds out, she expels Shujat from the house. In the car, Shujat's mother calls him and says his father is no more. This breaks Shujat's heart. He then tells his friend Fanny about planning something new. Meanwhile, Shaan and Zimmal leave their house and go to Maya's house. Shaan asks for forgiveness from Maya, and she forgives him. Shaan starts a new garment business, and he and Maya regain their love and trust in one another. Shaan and Maya then decide to fight against Shujat with the women Shujat robbed, and hire all those women in their garment business.

Shujat hires a hacker to steal all of the money from Kulsoom's account. Kulsoom suffers a heart attack and apologizes to Maya and Shaan, then Kulsoom hands the power of attorney of her company to Maya. On Nael's birthday, Maila is revealed to be pregnant and Nisar and Shehnaz visit her. Fanny then finds a girl named Nawal for Shujat after robbing Kulsoom and Tooba, and he meets Nawal's grandmother, who accepts Shujaat and Nawal's relationship. Shujat, Fanny, Nawal and her grandmother arrive at her house, where Shujat is shocked to see that Maya, Tooba, and the other women he robbed are standing there, with police officers standing behind Shujaat.

It is revealed that Nawal's grandmother is a senior police officer and that Shujaat's whole gang, including Khawar and Jahanara, have been arrested and the corrupt police officer who Maya went to has been suspended. Tooba tells Shujaat "once a cheater is always a cheater" and she tells him to go to hell, while Maya tells Shujat that the jail bars await him. Shujat is taken away by the police.

== Cast ==
=== Lead ===
- Saba Qamar as Maya Nisar Atray: Shajji's Former Wife and Shaan's wife.
- Ahsan Khan as Shujaat "Shajji" Atray/Tabraiz Khawar/Choudhary Hashim : Maya's Former Husband and Tooba's Husband
- Mikaal Zulfiqar as Shaan : Maya's second Husband

=== Recurring ===
- Mehmood Aslam as Nisar (Maya and Maila's father)
- Asma Abbas as Kulsoom, Shaan's stepmother
- Kinza Razzak as Simra (Shaan's ex-wife)
- Nida Mumtaz as Shehnaz Nisar (Maya and Maila's mother)
- Nazli Nasr as Shazia (Nail's mother and Nisar's sister)
- Annie Zaidi as Jahanara/Farzana
- Saife Hassan as Khawar
- Rabya Kulsoom as Maila Nisar Khan (Maya's younger sister and Talal's widow)
- Adnan Samad Khan as Nael (Shazia's only son)
- Aamna Malick as Rehana Choudhary : Shajji's second wife
- Izzah Malik as Nida (Talal's sister)
- Farah Nadeem as Mrs . Khan (Talal's mother)
- Naeema Butt as Tooba Atray (Shaan's stepsister and Shajji's third wife)
- Alee Hassan Shah as Talal Khan : Malia's Husband (Dead)
- Salma Qadir as Shama (Shehnaz's friend)
- Marhoom Ahmad Bilal as Fanny
- Hassan Shahnawaz Zaidi
- Tipu Sultan
- Roohi Khan
- Ahmed Bilal
- Hiba
- Sohail Masood
- Syed Sharafat Ali Shah

== Production ==
The series was announced in December 2021, with Qamar, Khan and Zulfiqar in the leading cast in their second project together, the first being Pani Jaisa Piyar in 2011. It is the eight project featuring Khan opposite Qamar, previously featured in Gharoor, Banjar, Bint e Adam, Muhabbat Yun Bhi Hoti Hai, Dastaan, Pani Jaisa Piyar, Na Kaho Tum Mere Nahi and Moomal Rano.

== Soundtrack ==
"Mere Dildar Sanam"

Song by Ali Zafar and Hina Nasarullah
- Language: Urdu, Punjabi
- Released: 13 May 2022
- Length: 5:00
- Label: ARY
- Songwriter: Ali Zafar
- Producer: iDream
External media
Audio
- Full OST on JioSaavn
Video
- Video on YouTube
