= Saba Qamar =

Pakistani actress (born 1984)

Saba Qamar Zaman PP TI
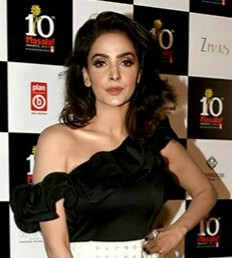
- Qamar at the Masala Awards in 2017
- Born: Saba Qamar Zaman; 5 April 1984 (age 42); Hyderabad, Sindh, Pakistan
- Occupation: Actress
- Years active: 2004–present
- Works: Full list
- Awards: Full list

Signature
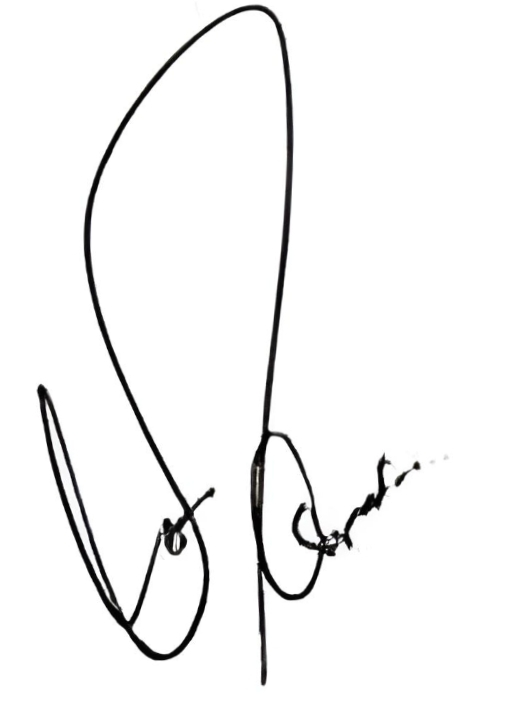

Saba Qamar Zaman (born 5 April 1984) is a Pakistani actress who works predominantly in Urdu films and television series. Qamar is one of Pakistan's most popular and highest-paid actresses. She is a recipient of several accolades including two Lux Style Awards and three PTV Awards alongside a Filmfare nomination. The Government of Pakistan has honoured her with the Tamgha-e-Imtiaz in 2012 and the Pride of Performance in 2016.

Qamar first received positive media attention for the role of Ruqsana Inayat in the historical drama Jinnah Ke Naam (2009). This was followed by further success in several television series, including the pre-partition drama Dastaan, the melodrama Uraan (both 2010), the romantic dramas Maat and Pani Jaisa Piyar (both 2011), the socio Thakan (2012), thriller Sannata, the romantic Bunty I Love You (both 2013), family drama Digest Writer (2014), crime thriller Sangat (2015) and Besharam (2016), receiving Best Actress nominations for these. She has also appeared in biographical film Manto (2015), romantic comedy Lahore Se Aagey (2016), and the Indian Hindi-language educational drama Hindi Medium (2017), for which she received a nomination of Filmfare Award for Best Actress.

Qamar has portrayed Fouzia Azeem and Noor Jehan in the 2017 biographical dramas Baaghi and Main Manto, and a strong-headed woman in the 2019 courtroom drama Cheekh. The first of these earned her a Lux Style Award for Best TV Actress. She also features in listings of the nation's popular personalities. In addition to acting, Qamar is involved with several humanitarian causes and is vocal about issues faced by women and children and has participated in concert tours and stage shows. She has featured as a host and comedian on the political satire Hum Sab Umeed Se Hain (2009–2015). Despite maintaining privacy, her off-screen life is the subject of substantial media coverage.

== Early life ==
Saba Qamar Zaman was born on 5 April 1984 in Hyderabad, Sindh, Pakistan. She has five siblings: three elder and one younger brother who died on 15 November 2022 and one elder sister. She lost her father at a very young age and spent most of her childhood in Gujranwala with her grandmother. She got her early education in Gujranwala, then moved to Lahore to pursue further studies. Her family is settled in Karachi.

== Acting career ==
=== Beginnings and breakthrough (2004–2011) ===
Qamar started her career with PTV television series Mein Aurat Hoon in 2004. She then appeared in telefilm Ishq directed by Dilawar Malik opposite Bilal Qureshi for Geo Entertainment. Later that year she appeared as model for Abrar-ul-Haq music video Boliyan from the award-winning album Nachan Main Audhay Naal. In 2005, Qamar played lead role in ATV's Chaap opposite Sami Khan. She then replaced Sophia Mirza in comedy drama Sussar In Law as Tania and made special appearances in Hera Pheri & Company as Sonia in Episode 40- 41 and in Punjabi anthology series Jag Beeti in Episode Faisla as Erum for PTV. In 2006, she starred in several classic PTV series including Kahin Tum Kahin Hum, Phool, Apno Ka Sath and Dhoop Mein Andhera Hai. She later did supporting roles in Gharoor and Taqdeer for PTV and Banjar for Geo Entertainment. She was paired with Ahsan Khan in both Banjar and Gharoor. Qamar later portrayed the role of Sana Hamdani in her first and only lead appearance opposite Fawad Khan in telefim Kal aired on PTV.

In 2007, Qamar appeared in two major ATV's serials Khuda Gawah which was the remake of 1992 Indian film of the same name and Muhabbat Ab Nahi Hogi. Later that year Qamar appeared in series of comedy dramas including Aaj TV's Mirch Masala with Veena Malik and Shamil Khan and PTV's Unbiyaanable, Maamo and No.1. In 2008, Qamar starred in melodrama Woh Subha Kab Aayegi, comedy series Not Responding and Nawab Manzil for ATV. She then did four supporting roles for PTV including Chubhan, Na Janay Kyun, Phool Aur Kantey and Bint-e-Adam. Her role in social drama Bint-e-Adam was of a rich brat who falls for a boy from a poor background, played by Ahsan Khan and marries him against her cruel father's wishes. Bint e Adam was a major critical and commercial hit, however, critics noted that her role was "limited" from an acting point of view. In 2009, she appeared in biographical drama Jinnah Ke Naam, which was the production of PTV Home in the direction of Tariq Mairaj. She played the role of Ruqsana Inayatullah and the series was a tribute to the founder of Pakistan, Muhammad Ali Jinnah. In an earlier interview with The Express Tribune, Qamar confessed, "For me, acting is being able to express the feelings, emotions and expressions of different people and characters". In the same year Qamar appeared in two Geo Entertainment serials Teri Ik Nazar and Nadia Naam Ki Larki. She then did PTV Home serials Hum Tu Karain Kamal, Mishaal and Tinkay. She won the PTV Awards for the best TV actress in both public and jury choice categories at the 16th Annual PTV awards, held on 23 July 2011 for her role in Tinkay.

In 2010, she appeared in a supporting role of Surraya in Hum TV's pre partition television series Dastaan, an adaptation of Razia Butt's novel Bano. She was seen opposite Ahsan Khan, Sanam Baloch and Fawad Khan. Series proved to be the break-through for her and she won the Best TV Actress trophy at the Pakistan Media Awards (2010). She then played lead role of Pooja Mohan Das in Indus Vision's partition based drama Kanpur Se Katas Tak. Qamar later appeared in two A-Plus dramas including Aankh Salamat Andhay Log and Rait Kay Dairay. She then appeared in soap Chaand Ki Goud Mein and social drama Uraan for Geo Entertainment. Qamar later played lead roles in PTV Home serial Lahore Junction opposite Shamil Khan and ATV's Amar Bel opposite Kashif Mehmood and Ghao opposite Sami Khan. Qamar later that year portrayed role of blind girl Naila Habib in Geo Entertainment anthology series Taaluq.

Qamar then appeared in Sarmad Khoosat's romantic series Pani Jaisa Piyar (2011), where she played the character of Sana who has been engaged to Adarsh, the son of her mother's best friend ever since she was a child. Adarsh, however, has been unaware of this engagement, as his parents thought that he needed to focus more on his education than wedding plans. It was followed by a role in PTV's Tera Pyar Nahi Bhoole. She was paired opposite Ahsan Khan in both the series. She then played characters in PTV Home's serials Khalida Ki Walida, Main Aisa Kyun Hoon, Nazar and Two In One. Later that year, she appeared in Maat where she played the self-obsessed Saman opposite Adnan Siddiqui and Aamina Sheikh. The series was a critical and commercial hit and became the thirteenth highest-rated Pakistani television series and garnered her the Pakistan Media Award for Best Actress. That same year, Qamar collaborated with Sami Khan in two projects, Jo Chale To Jaan Se Guzar Gaye and Main Chand Si receiving further praise. She then appeared in the Hum TV Eid telefilm Balay Ki Balli as Vaneeza. Later she was cast opposite Saleem Sheikh in the A-Plus sitcom Ghar Ki Baat Hai. Lastly she was seen as Neelofar in PTV Home's anthology series Faseel-e-Jaan Se Aagay in Episode Matti Ka Qarz.

=== Critical acclaim and professional expansion (2012–2015) ===
Qamar next appeared in Ameen Iqbal's Thakan (2012), where she played the role of Sadaf who works extremely hard like a machine day and night to run her family but no one except her grandfather feels sympathy for her or even cares about her. She then starred in ARY Digital's two Eid Telefilms Pyaar Mein Twins and Love Ki Kichri. It was followed by the leading roles in the Amna Nawaz Khan-written Na Kaho Tum Mere Nahi (2012) and Faiza Iftikhar's Yahan Pyar Nahin Hai (2012) The latter of which earned her a nomination for Best Actress at Hum Awards. She starred in another PTV Home serial Bhool. It was shot in 2008 but got delayed and finally released in 2012. She gained recognition for portraying a range of characters in the serials like Shikwa Na Shikayat (2012), Shehryar Shehzadi (2012), special appearance in ARY Digital's Timmy G (2012), Kaash Aisa Ho (2013), Miss Fire (2013), Sannata (2013), and Ullu Baraye Farokht Nahi (2013), some of which garnered her several best actress nominations. Qamar won her first Hum Awards for the Best TV Actress for her role as Diana in Bunty I Love You, at the 3rd Hum Awards.

That same year, Qamar worked in the television film Aina (2013), opposite Faysal Qureshi. The film, a remake of the 1977 film of the same name, was well received by the audience and she was nominated for the Best Actress award at the Tarang Housefull Awards. After two consecutive years of poorly received serials, Qamar's career prospects began to improve in 2014; she appeared in six projects: Jaanam, Bay Emaan Mohabbat, Na Katro Pankh Mere in her first time pairing with Danish Taimoor, Bunty I Love You, Izteraab, and Digest Writer. The romantic drama Jaanam (alongside Adnan Siddiqui) and the romance Bay Emaan Mohabbat (alongside Agha Ali and Adnan Shah Tipu) earned little praise, but the family drama Bunty I Love You (a story about a girl who got married aged 17 to a much older man, later dreams of living a free life after his death) was Qamar's first critical success since Maat. Directed by Siraj-ul-Haque, the series was generally well received. Reviewer from Daily Pakistan considered it along with Digest Writer as "one of the best performances of Qamar". The series received five nominations at Hum Awards including Qamar for best actress. She next appeared in Izteraab. Her performance as the working women did not go well and despite the strong cast, story, production house and promotions, the drama turned out to be a major critical and commercial Disaster. She then appeared for Wajahat Rauf's directed anthology series Shareek-e-Hayat for Hum TV.

Qamar appeared in three series in 2015. She first reunited with Muhammad Younis Butt and Fawad Wyne in the comedy series S.H.E where she played a role of lady S.H.O Bajirao Mastani. She then starred alongside Adeel Chaudhry in Fahim Burney's directorial Kaisay Tum Se Kahoon which tells the story of star-crossed lovers who are reincarnated. It was her third consecutive appearance in Momina Duraid's production. Although the series did not do well in terms of ratings, but her performance was praised by the critics. The following year, Qamar collaborated with Mikaal Zulfiqar for the third time (alongside Zahid Ahmed, Kiran Haq, and Sonia Mishal) in Kashif Nisar's Sangat where she played a role of Aisha, a rape survivor who faced difficulties when her husband came to know that he was not the biological father of a daughter they have. The series earned her the nomination for Best Actress in both Jury and Popular categories at the Hum Awards.

Qamar then made her acting debut in Lollywood as a leading actress in the acclaimed biographical drama Manto (2015). Directed by Sarmad Khoosat, the film was made on a big budget and performed poorly at the box office with a lifetime collection of Rs 5.05 million, however, it was critically praised and Qamar's portrayal of the singer Noor Jehan was well received by the critics, and earned her a nomination at the ARY Films Awards for Best Supporting Actress. The film was later adapted into a television series with the same cast in 2017, titled Main Manto, and was aired on Geo TV.

=== Established actress (2016–2019) ===
In 2016, Qamar played the role of a struggling actress in the period drama Mein Sitara, (serial based on lollywood golden era) alongside Mekaal Zulfiqar receiving Best Actress nomination and appeared as Mishal in Farooq Rind's Besharam opposite Zahid Ahmed. The latter was a hit commercially and critically. Sadaf Haider of The Express Tribune praised her saying, "Qamar is in great form as Mishi and plays her with restraint and quiet power; a welcome relief from the wounded women she has played of late". Qamar played a rockstar opposite Yasir Hussain, in the travel comedy Lahore Se Aagey (2016). The film, a sequel to the comedy Karachi Se Lahore, ranks among the highest-grossing Pakistani films of all time with a worldwide grossing of Rs 21.60 million receiving Nigar Awards for Best Film Actress. Later that year, she played a leading role in the psycho–thriller 8969, a critical and commercial failure.

Qamar was offered an Indian film opposite Randeep Hooda, and supporting roles in Once Upon a Time in Mumbaai (2012) and Heroine (2012), which she declined. After the 2016 Uri attack, relations between India and Pakistan deteriorated; the Indian Motion Picture Producers Association (IMPPA) and the Film Producers Guild of India banned Pakistani artists from working in India until the situation normalised. The comedy-drama Hindi Medium (2017), in which Qamar played the lead female role of Meeta Batra, a nouveau riche opposite Irrfan Khan, marked her first project in the Hindi cinema.

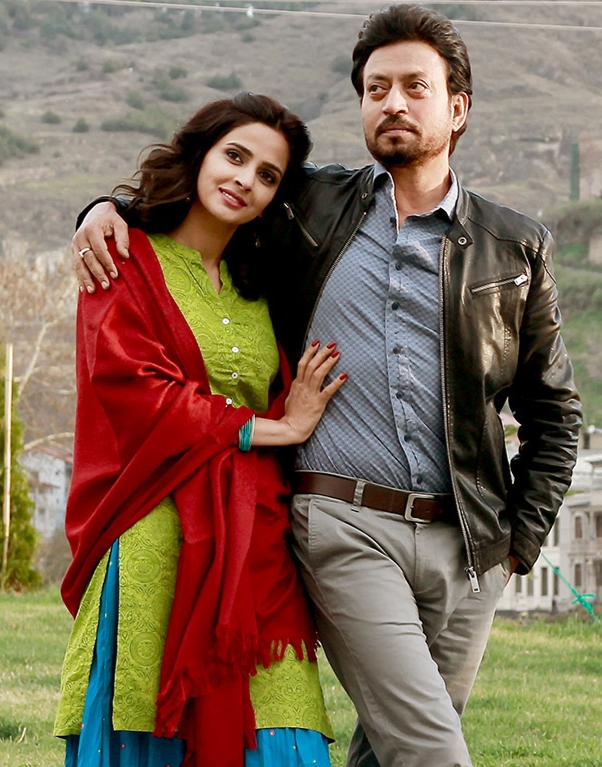
Qamar with co-star Irrfan Khan on the sets of Hindi Medium in 2017

Critical reception of the film was positive. A reviewer for The Times of India wrote, "Saba, as the dominating wife is sheer delight onscreen". In a scathing review, Sreehari Nair of Rediff.com labelled the film "fascinatingly frustrating" and called Qamar "natural actress, sexual daring". The film earned over ₹334.36 million worldwide, a majority of which came from the Chinese box office. Qamar received several Best Actress nominations at various award ceremonies, including a Best Actress nomination at Filmfare. Later that year, Qamar was declared as the top Bollywood debutante of 2017 by Eastern Eye.

In 2017, Qamar worked in the biographical drama series Baaghi, in the role of Pakistani controversial figure Qandeel Baloch. The series was a critical and commercial success, becoming one of the highest-grossing Pakistani drama of 2017. Qamar's performance was widely praised by the critics and her portrayal of the actress and singer was applauded even before its release. Neeha of The Nation wrote, "Without a doubt, Qamar has done an outstanding job", whereas reviewer from The Express Tribune said she "slayed the social media star with such finesse". The series earned her a Lux Style Awards for Best Actress (Television) and IPPA Awards for Best Actress.

In 2018, Qamar appeared in three short films. She first paired with Ahsan Khan in Siraj-ul-Haque directorial Moomal Rano. The film was made as part of the Zeal For Unity initiative to bridge cultural barriers between India and Pakistan. It was critically praised and was nominated for Best Film at the 2018 European Festival. It was released by digital platform Zee5. She then appeared in Fahim Burney's Dil Diyan Gallan, opposite Zahid Ahmed where she played the character of Raniya. She was then paired with Farhan Saeed for the first time in telefim Iss Dil Ki Essi Ki Tessi. Qamar later appeared as model for Shuja Haider's two music videos Jeewan Daan and Funn Mitti Se. In 2019, Qamar worked in crime drama Cheekh where she played a headstrong girl who fights for justice. It is considered both critical and commercial blockbuster.

=== Further success (2020-present) ===
In 2020, she narrated Zara Abid's debut short film Sikka released on Qissa Nagri YouTube channel. She later collaborated with Bilal Saeed for music video Qubool which she also directed. In 2021, Qamar portrayed the role of Naheed Ahmed Tasnim in telefim Hangor S-131 aired on ARY Digital. In the same year Qamar appeared as model for Abrar-ul-Haq's and Mustafa Zahid's music videos Begum Shak Karti Hai and Chingaariyan respectively. In 2022, Qamar made her film comeback after five year hiatus with Sarmad Khoosat's Kamli and Saqib Khan's Ghabrana Nahi Hai. Qamar got several accolades for Kamli including IVIF and Lux Style Awards for Best Film Actress. She later received praise for portraying Maya Nisar in ARY Digital's hit crime thriller Fraud collaborating with Ahsan Khan and Mikaal Zulfiqar. In the same year Qamar made her OTT debut with Zee5 critical and commercially successful web series Mrs and Mr Shameem and Urduflix Original Naina Ki Sharafat. She then appeared as model for Asim Azhar's music video Kabhi Main Kabhi Tum opposite Fahad Mustafa.

In 2023, Qamar portrayed taxi driver Rania in short series Sar-e-Rah winning Best Actress award by USAID. It was produced by IDream Entertainment in collaboration with USAID. In the same year she joined hands with Pakistan Polio Eradication Programme on polio awareness, starring in Yehi Waqt Hai YouTube mini series along with Haroon Shahid, Kiran Haq and Agha Mustafa Hassan. She received widespread acclaim for playing antagonist Gul Meher in Express Entertainment's mini-series Gunah directed by Adnan Sarwar opposite Juggan Kazim, Rabia Butt and Sarmad Khoosat. Qamar next collaborated with Green Entertainment for three projects including the classic romantic drama Tumhare Husn Ke Naam, the crime mystery Serial Killer and the social drama Pagal Khana. In 2025, Qamar made her Hum TV comeback after seven years with Saife Hassan's directorial telefilm Mohabbat Youn Bhi Honi Thi opposite Ahsan Khan. Qamar next appeared opposite Faysal Quraishi in Geo Entertainment's courtroom serial Case No. 9 and Green Entertainment's Pamaal opposite Usman Mukhtar.

== Other work and media image ==
In 2009, Qamar joined the political satire show Hum Sab Umeed Se Hain, as a host and presenter where she also did the parody of politicians and actors. The show was extremely popular and was at the number one spot in ratings in Pakistan. She decided to quit the show and was replaced by Meera in 2013. In January 2018, she appeared in photoshoot for Mahid Khawar's creation "Padmavat" where she dressed up like Rani Padmavati. In May 2018, she showcased golden bridal couture for designer Nilofer Shahid. She was showstopper for Rimple and Harpreet Narula's first Pakistan show on Shaan-E-Pakistan. On 10 December 2018, she walked the ramp for designer Uzma Babar's collection Umsha on Bridal Couture Week. Qamar became the ambassador for a number of brands including Lux Pakistan, Sunsilk, Dalda, Ufone, and Tapal.

Qamar is considered one of the nation's most popular and highest-paid actresses. After the success of Mein Sitara and Hindi Medium, she was cited by critics as one of the finest actresses in Pakistan. Throughout her career, she has received several accolades including Lux Style Awards, Hum Awards, Pakistan Media Awards, PTV Awards and a Filmfare Awards nomination. In 2012, Government of Pakistan honoured her with Tamgha-e-Imtiaz, the fourth-highest decoration given to civilians in Pakistan based on their achievements. In 2016, she received Pride of Performance in recognition of meritorious work in the fields of arts.

In addition to acting, Qamar has supported charitable organisations for various causes. She is involved with several humanitarian causes and is vocal about issues faced by women and children. In June 2018, she did a special appearance in Shuja Haider's music video "Jeevan Daan" to raised awareness against child abuse. The song was socially relevant and highlights issues concerning children and women. In August 2018, Qamar expressed in an interview, "I encourage and urge people to invest in good education as it will shape the future of our children and our society". On Independence Day in 2018, Daily Times named Qamar "Pride of Pakistan".

In April 2020, she started her YouTube channel and released mini series Isolation based on the situation of Lockdown due to COVID-19 following The Chay Show,Chaska News, Kab Samjho Gay, Breaking The Stereotype, Music video Ek Adhuri Love Story: Chingariyan with Mustafa Zahid, Eid 2023 special Eid Ka Din, Khala Ki Jaan and Jins. She further raised her hands for collecting COVID relief funds for poor minorities and transgender communities with Ali Zafar's charity trust "Ali Zafar Foundation". Qamar revealed through her YouTube channel about her relationship in which she was engaged for eight years and parted ways with him. She described it as abusive relationship.

On 11 October, Qamar was appointed as UNICEF's first National Ambassador for Child Rights in Pakistan coinciding with the International Day of the Girl Child. This role marks a significant step in her advocacy efforts, focusing on promoting the rights and well-being of children in Pakistan.
