= 11th Lux Style Awards =

Pakistani film awards ceremony

- Title screen of the ceremony
- Date: 14 February 2012; 16 February 2012
- Site: Expo Centre, Karachi
- Hosted by: Ahmed Ali Butt, Saba Qamar
- Produced by: Frieha Altaf (Catwalk Productions)
- Directed by: Sharmeen Obaid-Chinoy
- Organized by: Unilever Pakistan

Highlights
- Best Picture: Bol
- Best Actor: Manzar Sehbai (Bol)
- Best Actress: Humaima Malik (Bol)

Television coverage
- Channel: ARY Digital

The 2012 Lux Style Awards, officially known as the 11th Lux Style Awards ceremony, presented by the Lux Style Awards honors the best films of 2011 and took place from 14 to 16 February 2012. This year, Karachi hosted these awards for the Pakistani film and entertainment industry.

The official ceremony took place on 16 February 2012, at the Expo Centre, in Karachi. During the ceremony, The lux Style Awards were awarded in 27 competitive categories. The ceremony was televised in Pakistan and internationally on ARY Digital. Actor Reema Khan and Saba Qamar hosted the ceremony with Ahmed Ali Butt.

== Background ==
The Lux Style Awards is an award ceremony held annually in Pakistan since 2002. The awards celebrate "style" in the Pakistani entertainment industry, and honour the country's best talents in film, television, music, and fashion. Around 30 awards are given annually.

== Winners and nominees ==
Winners are listed first and highlighted in boldface.

=== Film ===
Best Film
**Bol**
Best Actor	Best Actress
**Manzar Sehbai – Bol**	**Humaima Malick – Bol**

=== Television ===
Best Television Serial – Terrestrial	Best Television Serial – Satellite
**Tera Pyar Nahi Bhoole (PTV)**; Aao Kahani Buntay Hain (PTV); Dil Behkay Ga (PTV); Jeena Tou Ha (PTV); Kachra Kundi (PTV)	**Mera Saaein (ARY Digital)**; Kis Din Mera Viyah Howay Ga (Geo TV); Mera Naseeb (Hum TV); Pani Jaisa Pyar (Hum TV); Takkay ki Ayegi Baraat (Geo TV)
Best Television Actor – Satellite	Best Television Actress – Satellite
**Faisal Qureshi – Roag (ARY Digital)**; Ali Safina – Takkay ki Ayegi Baraat (Geo TV); Fahad Mustafa – Main Abdul Qadir Hoon (Hum TV); Fahad Mustafa – Mastana Mahi (Hum TV); Noman Ejaz – Mera Saaein (ARY Digital)	**Savera Nadeem – Qaid-e-Tanhai (Hum TV)**; Aamina Sheikh – Umm-e-Kulsoom (ARY Digital); Beenish Chohan – Mera Saaein (ARY Digital); Hina Dilpazeer – Tum Ho Ke Chup (Geo TV); Saba Qamar – Pani Jaisa Pyar (Hum TV)
Best Television Actor – Terrestrial	Best Television Actress – Terrestrial
**Noman Ejaz – Aao Kahani Buntay Hain (PTV)**; Junaid Khan – Dil Ki Lagi (ATV); Mehmood Aslam – Aankh Salamat Andhay Log(ATV); Moammar Rana – Aankh Salamat Andhay Log (ATV); Ahsan Khan – Tera Pyar Nahi Bhoole (PTV)	**Sanam Baloch – Sehra Teri Pyas (PTV)**; Mahjabeen Sumbal – Kachra Kundi (PTV); Maira Khan – Aankh Salamat Andhay Log (ATV); Saba Qamar – Tera Pyar Nahi Bhoole (PTV); Sania Saeed – Aao Kahani Buntay Hain (PTV)
Best Television Director	Best Television Writer
**Sarmad Khoosat –Pani Jaisa Pyar (Hum TV)**; Adnan Ahmed – Mera Naseeb (Hum TV); Babar Javed – Mera Saaein (ARY Digital); Kanwal Khoosat – Aao Kahani Buntay Hain (PTV); Yasir Nawaz – Uraan (Geo TV)	**Samira Fazal – Mera Naseeb (Hum TV)**; Anwar Sajjad – Dil Behkay Ga; Umera Ahmad – Qaid-e-Tanhai (Hum TV); Samira Fazal – Mera Saaein (ARY Digital); Umera Ahmad – Uraan (Geo TV)

=== Music ===
Best Album	Best Music Video Director
**Jhoom – Ali Zafar**; Beyond Kismat – Josh; Uss Paar – Qyaas; Dhoom – Call; Umeed – Bilal Khan	**Shahbaz Shigri & Aisha Akhtar – Paki Rambo’ (Adil Omar)**; Sumit Bhardwaj – Pyar Ho Gaya’ (Josh); Adnan Malik – Mera Bichra Yaar’ (Zoe Viccaji & Strings); Farhad Humayun – ‘Batti’ (Overload); Jami – – ‘Bum Paata’ (Ali Azmat)
Best Original Soundtrack	Best Song of the Year
**Qurat-ul-Ain Balouch – Humsafar (Hum TV)**; Atif Aslam and Hadiqa Kiani – Bol; Ahmed Jahanzeb – Khuda Aur Muhabbat (Geo TV); Ifti – Main Abdul Qadir Hoon (Hum TV); Riaz Ali Khan – Qaid-e-Tanhai (Hum TV)	**Woh Humsafar Tha – Qurat-ul-Ain Balouch**; Bum Phata – Ali Azmat; Hona Tha Pyaar – Atif Aslam and Hadiqa Kiani; Jhoom – Ali Zafar; Mera Bichra Yaar – Strings and Zoe Viccaji
Best Emerging Talent in Music
**Adil Omar**; Poor Rich Boy; Ram Lal; Usman Riaz

=== Fashion ===
Best Model of the Year - Female	Best Model of the Year - Male
**Rabia Butt**; Ayyan Ali; Fouzia Aman; Cybil Chaudhry; Amna Ilyas	**Abbas Jafri**; Iffi Zafar; Kashif Deewan; Waleed Khalid
Best Achievement in Fashion Design - Luxury Prèt	Best Achievement in Fashion Design - Prèt
**Sania Maskatiya**; Adnan Pardesy; Shehla Chatoor; Ali Xeeshan; Khadija Shah of Elan	**Kamiar Rokni**; Khaadi; Sanam Chaudhri; Sania Maskatiya; Body Focus
Best Achievement in Fashion Design - Lawn	Best Achievement in Fashion Design - Menswear
**Sana Safinaz**; Deepak Perwani for Orient; Umar Sayeed for Al-Karam; Khaadi; Wardah Saleem	**Omar Farooq of Republic**; Hassan Sheheryar Yasin; Fahad Hussayn; Ismail Farid; Jazib Qamar
Best High Street Brand	Best Emerging Talent in Fashion
**Zaheer Abbas (Designer)**; Akif Mehmood (Designer); Mohsin Ali (Designer); Mohsin Ali (Designer); Nadir Firoz Khan & Maha Burney at NFK Photography (Styling & Photography)	**Amna Babar - Female Model**; Azeem Sani - Fashion Photographer; Mahgul Rashid - Fashion Designer; Natasha and Saloon - Hair and Makeup Artist; Tabesh Oza - Male Model

== Lifetime achievement award ==
Ahmed Rushdi

== Lux Style Achievement Award ==
Sharmeen Obaid-Chinoy

== Best Dressed Female ==
Sanam Chaudhry

== Best Dressed Male ==
Umair Tabani
