= Moomal Rano =

Pakistani short film

- Directed by: Siraj-ul-Haque; Abdul Ahad and Moiz (Assistant Directors)
- Written by: Syed Zafar Mairaj
- Produced by: Shailja Kejirwal; Siraj ul Haque co-produced Vikas Sharma
- Starring: Ahsan Khan; Saba Qamar
- Cinematography: Shahzad Khan
- Edited by: Rabiranjan Maitra
- Music by: Qasim Azhar
- Production company: Zee TV Production
- Distributed by: zee5
- Release date: 2017
- Running time: 60 minutes
- Country: Pakistan
- Languages: Urdu, Sindhi

Moomal Rano previously titled Mohabbat Ki Aakhri Kahani is a Pakistani short film directed by Siraj-ul-Haque. It has Ahsan Khan and Saba Qamar as lead roles and is written by Zafar Meraj. The short film is being produced by Zee TV Production as part of the Zeal For Unity festival.

== Plot ==
Moomal Rano is the story of Sarmad and Nigar, modern day Romeo and Juliet frequenting a village haveli where they have been listening to folklore love tales since childhood. When Sarmad & Nigar make the decision to be together, they aren't accepted as lovers and are opposed by the same person who taught them lessons of love. Eventually, both meet a tragic fate as they are shot dead in the name of Honor Killing (Karo Kari). Mohabbat ki Aakhri Kahaani exposes the dark truth of honor killing which is a real burning issue on both sides of the border.

== Cast ==
=== Lead ===
- Saba Qamar as Nigar
- Ahsan Khan as Sarmad

=== Recurring ===
- Salman Saeed as Zaman
- Zainab Jameel as Rani
- Asad Qureshi

== Production ==
Initially, the film was titled Mohabbat Ki Aakhri Kahani but the makers changed it to Moomal Rano. In a career spanning across 16 years, Siraj-ul-Haque has a repertoire of TV series such as Saari Bhool Hamari Thi and Bunty I Love You, films and documentaries to his credit. After tasting success as an assistant director for the acclaimed film Khamosh Pani, he went on to make his first feature film, Chandani. Moomal Rano is written by Zafar Miraj and the film will be screened in film festivals in India. Ahsan Khan was chosen as the main Male, whilst Saba Qamar was chosen as the lead Female for the film. Saba in an Interview stated that she will be playing the role of a Sindhi Girl.

== Music ==
The music is done by Qasim Azhar, and OST Lyrics by Uzma Iftikhar. Whilst Sufi poetry is done by Shah Abdul Latif Bhattai.
