= Mrs. & Mr. Shameem =

2022 Pakistani web series

- Urdu: مسز اینڈ مسٹر شمیم
- Genre: Drama; Social
- Written by: Saji Gul
- Directed by: Kashif Nisar
- Starring: Nauman Ijaz; Saba Qamar
- Country of origin: Pakistan
- Original language: Urdu
- No. of episodes: 20

Production
- Executive producers: Vrinda Kapoor; Vidita Munankar; Nandini Kundu
- Producers: Kashif Nisar; Misbah Shafique
- Cinematography: Hassam Mairaj
- Editor: Liaqat A. Balti
- Production company: 26th Frame Entertainment

Original release
- Network: Zindagi
- Release: 11 March 2022

Mrs. & Mr. Shameem is a 2022 Zindagi original Pakistani web series released on ZEE5 on 11 March 2022. It is written by Saji Gul and directed by Kashif Nisar, who co-produced it with Misbah Shafique. The web series stars Naumaan Ijaz and Saba Qamar in leading roles. It tells the story of a strong-willed woman and an effeminate man, who defy societal norms, get married and find love together.

== Premise ==
Umaina is an independent woman, living in a hostel in Lahore. Shameem is the elder brother of Umaina’s friend. The community makes fun of Shameem for being effeminate. Due to some unforeseen circumstances, they are forced to live together and get married. Later, they fall for each other and face the challenges of their lives together.

== Episodes ==
No.	Title	Directed by	Written by	Original release date
1	"Shameem aur Umaina Ki Dastaan"	Kashif Nisar	Saji Gul	March 11, 2022
An older couple, Umaina and Shameem usually called as Shammo invited in a TV show to share their life story, especially of Shammo who has recovered from a fatal disease and lead his life in cruel society not being so manly. Umaina shares that they come across each other through Salma who was her friend and Shammo's sister. She comes to attend her wedding in Shammo's house where he sees her with her boyfriend Bilal who slaps her when she denies to abort their illegitimate child. She tells that she gets attracted towards Bilal due to his typical masculine features.
2	"Uljhane Dil Ki"	Kashif Nisar	Saji Gul	11 March 2022
Shammo visits Umina in her hostel frequently but she refuses to meet him. One day, she herself goes to him and brings him to Bilal's house but eventually doesn't have the courage to go inside. After some days, Shammo comes to know that she is going to her house in Jhelum. In her house, her stepmother comes to know about her pregnancy and tells her father who throws her out of the house. She comes back to the hostel again and the warden also denies to allow her to live as her stepmother has told her about her pregnancy. Shammo comes there and takes her to his house.
3	"Dosti Ka Imtehaan"	Kashif Nisar	Saji Gul	11 March 2022
He tells a lie in his house that her hostel is closed that's why she will live here for some days. She gets furious when Shammo wishes her to marry her. She leaves the house and goes to Bilal who is busy in his wedding ceremony. Shammo brings her back eventually. Shammo's brother-in-law Abdullah objects on Ummi's staying in the house to which Shammo says that he will marry her. Everyone opposes him and laughs but Bay ji stands by her son.
4	"Qaid-e-Nikkah"	Kashif Nisar	Saji Gul	March 11, 2022
The nikkah of Umaina and Shammo happens and Umaina isn’t happy with it. She is rude to Shammo and instead contacts Bilal and begs him to let her become his mistress. She meets Bilal and tries to share her depressed state with him but he as usual starts want to get physical with her. She gets furious and leaves him forever. Her condition deteriorates and she starts feeling unwell due to pregnancy. She gives birth to a male baby after six months of her marriage due to which everyone suspects it as an illegitimate. Umina stays away from her son Ali due to postpartum depression and doesn't care about him due to which his health gets affected. Shammo alone brings him up.

== Cast ==
- Naumaan Ijaz as Shameem “Shammo”
- Saba Qamar as Umaina "Ummi"
- Gul-e-Rana as Bay Ji
- Faiza Gillani as Rukhsana
- Aamna Malick as Wajeeha
- Hamza Sohail as Ali
- Samia Butt as Salma
- Ali Azad as Salma's husband
- Saqib Sumeer as Khurram
- Uzma Hassan as Humaira
- Ahmad Hassan as Tony
- Haseeb Khan as Abdullah
- Agha Mustafa as Bilal
- Irfan Khoosat as Umaina’s father
- Anjum Habibi as Abbasi
- Aleeza Fatima as Fatima
- Arham Khan as Ali(childstar) Saba and nauman's son
- Hassan Mir as Hassan (Barber)

== Release ==
All the 20 episodes were released on 11 March 2022 on Zee5.

It was made available on YouTube channel of Zindagi in April 2024, with two episodes in a week.

The series premiered in early 2026 on Express Entertainment.

== Production ==
The concept of Mrs. & Mr. Shameem was first conceived by Nauman Ijaz in the early 2010s. He approached Kashif Nisar to bring the idea to life, but initial rejections from local television networks led to the script being picked up by ZEE5, an OTT platform. The web series was announced in May 2019, with Ijaz and Saba Qamar cast as the lead characters.

Filming began in September 2019 in Lahore and wrapped up in January 2021. According to writer Saji Gul, the series explores themes of nonconformity to traditional gender roles and expectations. Nauman Ijaz plays an effeminate yet straight character, adding a unique layer to the story. In July 2020, it was reported that the series would be released on ZEE5.

After a few title changes, 'Mrs. and Mr. Shameem' was finally released on March 11, 2022. The official trailer, launched on March 2, 2022, received positive reviews from audiences and critics alike.

== Soundtrack ==
Mrs. & Mr. Shameem

Soundtrack album by Sami Khan
- Recorded: 2019–21
- Venues: Lahore, Pakistan
- Genre: Qawwali Soundtrack
- Length: 15:50
- Label: Zee

All tracks are written by Sami Khan.

No.	Title	Singer(s)	Length
1.	"Ishq Bina"	Zain Ali, Zohaib Ali, Abeer Hussain	5:06
2.	"Dillagi" (recreated from original by Purnam Allahabadi and Nusrat Fateh Ali Khan)	Sahir Ali Bagga, Zain Ali, Zohaib Ali, Fariha Pervez	5:25
3.	"Nami Danam"	Asim Khan (also music)	1:55
4.	"Ajj Lagiya Yeh Pata" (also lyrics by Aftab)	Fariha Pervez	3:24
Total length:			15:50
