= Uraan (2010 TV series) =

- Opening title screen
- Written by: Umera Ahmed
- Directed by: Yasir Nawaz
- Starring: Aamina Sheikh; Humayun Saeed; Saba Qamar
- Opening theme: Yeh Kya Hua by Ayesha Omar
- Composer: Waqar Ali
- Country of origin: Pakistan
- Original language: Urdu
- No. of episodes: 17

Production
- Running time: ~40 minutes
- Production company: Evernew Productions

Original release
- Network: Geo Entertainment
- Release: 6 November 2010 – 12 March 2011

Uraan (Urdu: اُڑان, lit. 'The flight') is a Pakistani drama television serial which premiered on Geo Entertainment on 6 November 2010. The serial is written by Umera Ahmed, directed by Yasir Nawaz and produced by Evernew Productions. It is a serial that not only deals with the issues of marriage, divorce and domestic violence but also recognizes the strength, talent and courage of the modern Pakistani woman. Retitled as Maan Jaao, it also aired in India on Zindagi.

== Plot ==
Uraan is the story of Sana (Aamina Sheikh), Sawera (Zhalay Sarhadi) and Ayesha (Saba Qamar), three educated Pakistani women who are total strangers to each other. However, by a twist of fate, they eventually find themselves linked to each other in the most shocking way imaginable.

Sana Hamdani, host and writer of Pakistan's most popular talk show, Uraan, is educated, broad-minded and one of the most well-known celebrities in Pakistan. Her show Uraan talks about sensitive issues in Pakistani society, which has made her rise to fame in a few short months. Dr. Faraz Saeed (Humayun Saeed), a highly esteemed, Harvard-grad psychologist frequently appears on the show to discuss the psychological problems which have led to these problems in Pakistani society. Sana soon begins to receive text messages, e-mails and phone calls from a mysterious man who identifies himself as "The one who knows you". She soon begins to receive bouquets as well, but cannot tell who is sending them.

Ayesha Aleem, a medical student who quit school before earning her degree because of her marriage, was previously married to Dr. Faraz Saeed. However, Faraz divorced her seemingly for no reason and severed all ties with her, and refused to even return her dowry. Ayesha, emotionally broken after this, attempts to commit suicide. Faraz uses this event to fuel his argument that Ayesha is schizophrenic and mentally unstable, which was why he was forced to divorce her. Ayesha's father, shocked by the false accusations placed on his daughter, takes the case to court. It is later revealed that Ayesha is not insane, but simply depressed. During their marriage, Faraz used to beat her and verbally abuse her. He would frequently ask her whether she loved him enough to undergo pain for him, and would abuse her when she said yes, such as pressing a burning cigarette to her back. While Faraz and his family acted mentally unstable around Ayesha, they seemed perfectly normal in public, leading Ayesha to believe that she herself was at fault. She suffered with Faraz for 3 years before he finally divorced her.

Meanwhile, Faraz's mother Dr. Sarah Saeed (Shamim Hilaly) has already chosen a new girl, Sawera, an esteemed fashion designer, for her son. The two meet and quickly fall in love, and are married months later. Faraz tells Sawera about his previous marriage and claims that the two were divorced because of Ayesha's mental condition. He says that Ayesha tried to kill both herself and him several times. After the two are married, Faraz emails their wedding and honeymoon pictures to Ayesha in order to further mentally torture her.

Soon, however, after learning about the truth of Faraz from her friend Raza, the lawyer fighting Ayesha's case, the couple's relationship falters. Sawera meets with Ayesha and realizes that Faraz isn't what he seems to be. The two have numerous arguments resulting in Faraz physically abusing Sawera. However, unlike Ayesha, Sawera does not allow him to beat her, and moves back to her mother's (Ismat Zaidi) home and files for divorce. Ayesha and Sawera become friends, and Ayesha recovers from her depression after seeing how Sawera managed to come back to her previous life despite all of the mental torture she suffered with Faraz.

Sana soon realizes that the mysterious "The one who knows you" is in fact Dr. Faraz. The two have become good friends through this, as "The one who knows you" has helped her cope with a lot of personal issues, such as accepting her estranged father back into her life. Faraz proposes to Sana weeks later, and she accepts, unaware of his previous marriages and true personality. She plans to shoot the last episode of Uraan live, as she will no longer be able to continue with it after marriage. She comes to Sawera to have her wedding dress designed, and Sawera realizes that Sana is to marry the same Faraz that she has just divorced. She tells Ayesha, and the two confront Sana and tell her the truth. Ayesha, realizing that even someone as strong as the great Sana Hamdani can be tricked by Faraz, finally fully recovers from her depression and begins to relive her life.

Sana does not tell Faraz that she knows the truth. She invites her parents and Faraz and his parents to be VIP audience members at her last show. She also invites Ayesha and Sawera on the show. The two are reluctant at first but finally agree. Sana arranges to have the studio doors locked so that Faraz and his family cannot leave until the show is over. She then reveals Faraz's true identity to the public, asking Sawera and Ayesha to recount how Faraz ruined their lives. Faraz has a mental breakdown on live television, and Sana requests that the government revoke Faraz's psychology license until he himself is treated.

The show then skips to three years later. Sawera has married her friend Raza, with whom she shares a daughter, while Sana is busy writing a book recounting the pain she, Sawera, and Ayesha went through because of Faraz. Ayesha has also returned to being mentally stable again and is seen talking to a possible suitor. Faraz has returned to town after treatment with his mother and is practicing again. Faraz's mother tells him about a possible suitor she met at the mall. It's implied that Faraz still hasn't changed at all and the show ends with a close-up on Faraz's face.

== Cast and characters ==
- Aamina Sheikh as Sana Hamdani
- Saba Qamar as Ayesha Aleem
- Humayun Saeed as Dr. Faraz
- Zhalay Sarhadi as Savera
- Shamim Hilaly as Dr. Sarah Saeed
- Hina Khawaja Bayat as Sana's mother
- Ismat Zaidi as Savera's mother
- Khalid Ahmed as Asjad
- Khalid Malik as Jawad
- Sohail Asghar
- Zubair as Sana's Father

== Soundtrack ==
The official soundtrack Ye kya hua is sung by Ayesha Omar and composed by Waqar Ali.

== Awards and nominations ==
Year	Awards	Category	Nominee(s) /Recipient(s)	Result	Ref.
2012	Lux Style Awards	Best Television Writer	Umera Ahmed	Nominated	
2012	Lux Style Awards	Best Television Director	Yasir Nawaz	Nominated	
