= Kaash Aisa Ho =

Pakistani television series

- Genre: Drama; Romance
- Written by: Maha Malik
- Directed by: Sohail Javed
- Starring: Saba Qamar; Mohib Mirza
- Theme music composer: Mekaal Hasan
- Opening theme: "Kaash Aisa Ho" by Humaira Channa
- Country of origin: Pakistan
- Original language: Urdu

Production
- Producers: Babar Javed; Asif Raza Mir
- Production location: Karachi
- Editor: Ishfaq Yousaf
- Camera setup: Multi-camera setup
- Production company: A&B Entertainment

Original release
- Network: ARY Digital
- Release: January 2013

Kaash Aisa Ho is a 2013 television series that aired on ARY Digital. It was written by Maha Malik, directed by Sohail Javed and produced by Asif Raza Mir and Babar Javed of A&B Entertainment. It stars Saba Qamar and Mohib Mirza in lead. It was also aired in India on Zindagi TV under the same title from 27 July 2016 and ended its run on 20 August 2016.

== Synopsis ==
Kaash Aisa Ho is a tale of Irfa (Saba Qamar) an orphan. She has been in love with Shayan (Mohib Mirza) her cousin since childhood. Shayan on the other hand is fond of her but doesn't notice her love towards him and mistakes it for mere friendly affection. Shayan is obsessed with perfection and wants a divine goddess for him. Although after many events they get happily married to each other. They have a child after their marriage but eventually, after some disputes, he leaves Irfa and her child behind and from there Irfa begins her journey as a single parent. The story explores the journey of Irfa who was an orphan and now has to raise her child.

== Cast ==
- Saba Qamar as Irfa
- Mohib Mirza as Shayan
- Juggan Kazim
- Zainab Qayyum
- Shahood Alvi
- Tahira Imam
- Sana Askari as Maliha
- Jahanzeb Gurchani
- Yasra Rizvi
