= Sania Maskatiya =

South Asian fashion designer

- Education: Indus Valley School of Art and Architecture
- Occupation: Fashion Designer
- Website: saniamaskatiya.com

Sania Maskatiya is a Pakistani fashion designer who co-founded her eponymous label in 2010 with her brother and business partner, Umair Tabani.

In November 2024, Sania Maskatiya launched TIYA. – a resort wear label inspired by travel and global trends, available on Al Tayer's OUNASS.com.

== Early life and education ==
Born and raised in Karachi, Sania Maskatiya graduated with a degree in textile design from Indus Valley School of Art and Architecture.

== Early career ==
Sania Maskatiya began her career in fashion design in 2007, while her brother Umair Tabani, a qualified ACA accountant and graduate of the London School of Economics joined PricewaterhouseCoopers UK in 2003. The sibling co-founded the Sania Maskatiya label in 2010,
