= Syed Ahmed Kamran =

Pakistani television director

Syed Ahmed Kamran is a Pakistani television director, known for Utray Ga Ab Na Koi Khizar (2011), Chemistry (2010) and Digest Writer (2014).

== Filmography ==
=== Television ===
The drama series directed by Kamran include:

- Taluq (Geo TV)
- Chand Parosa (Geo TV)
- Chemistry (Geo TV)
- Tere Ishq Main (Geo TV)
- Mere Khuwaboon Ka Diya
- Shehryar Shehzadi (2012)
- Muhabbat har, Muhabbat Jeet (ATV)
- Agan (A Plus)
- Arraigned Marriage (ARY Digital)
- Digest Writer (Hum TV)
- Mohabbat Aag Si (Hum TV)
- Hiddat (Geo TV)
- Mah-e-Tamaam (Hum TV)
- Mohabbat Na Kariyo (Geo TV)

== Awards and nominations ==
Year	Award	Category	Result	Ref.
2014	Hum Awards	Best Director Drama Serial	Nominated	
