= Izteraab =

- Written by: Amna Mufti
- Directed by: Misbah Khalid
- Starring: Saba Qamar; Mikaal Zulfiqar
- Country of origin: Pakistan
- Original language: Urdu
- No. of episodes: 21

Production
- Producers: Momina Duraid; Sultana Siddiqui
- Camera setup: Multi-camera setup
- Production companies: M&M Production

Original release
- Network: Hum TV
- Release: 2 April – 27 August 2014

Related
- Ishq Mein Teray; Shanakht

Izteraab is a 2014 Pakistani television series that aired on Hum TV and was written by Amna Mufti and directed by Misbah Khalid. It is produced by M&M Productions. It stars Saba Qamar and Mekaal Zulfiqar in their second on-screen collaboration after Pani Jaisa Piyar in 2011.

== Plot ==
Izteraab is the tale of a man having two wives. Jazib fell in love with Zara, and they married. Jazib is conservative by nature, whereas his wife Zara is liberal minded, which causes disagreements between them resulting in separation. Jazib then marries Dua. The story takes a new turn when he learns that Zara has cancer. Later, Jazib and Zara reunite. It is implied that Dua leaves to do some social work so Jazib and Zara and their children can work to become a family again.

== Cast ==
- Saba Qamar as Zara
- Mikaal Zulfiqar as Jazib
- Saniya Shamshad as Dua
- Seemi Raheel as Rashida: Jazib's aunt
- Mehreen Khurram as Sofia
