= Jal Pari (TV series) =

2011 Pakistani television series

- Title screen
- Also known as: Deewana Kise Banayegi Yeh Ladki
- Genre: Drama
- Written by: Sarmad Sehbai
- Starring: Neelam Muneer; Mikaal Zulfiqar (For entire cast see the section on cast below)
- Country of origin: Pakistan
- Original language: Urdu
- No. of seasons: 1
- No. of episodes: 17

Production
- Production location: Pakistan

Original release
- Network: Geo Entertainment
- Release: 13 October 2011 – 2 February 2012

Jal Pari (transl. Mermaid) is a 2011 Pakistani television drama series aired on Geo Entertainment, directed by Sarmad Sultan Khoosat and written by Sarmad Sehbai. The serial was originally broadcast from 13 October 2011 to 2 February 2012 and features Neelam Muneer, Adnan Siddiqui, Noman Ijaz and Mikaal Zulfiqar.

Retitled as Deewana Kise Banayegi Yeh Ladki, it also broadcast in India on Zindagi.

== Cast ==
- Neelam Muneer as Shaista
- Adnan Siddiqui as Rashid
- Noman Ijaz
- Mikaal Zulfiqar
- Hina Khawaja Bayat
- Saife Hassan As Shaista's Principal
- Adnan Shah Tipu
- Mahjabeen Habib
- Hafeez Mama
- Shamim Hilaly
- Uzmi
- Gohar Rasheed
- Rashid Farooqi
- Raza Zaidi
- Zulfiqar Ikhlaqi
- Rabiya Kazi
- Sabir shah Camkani

== Soundtrack ==
The Jal Pari original title song is sung by Rahat Fateh Ali Khan and composers are Farukh Abid and Shoaib Farukh.
