= Tera Pyar Nahi Bhoole =

- Genre: Drama; Romance
- Written by: Jahanzeb Qamar
- Directed by: Fouzia Siddique; Rafique Ahmad Warraich
- Starring: Ahsan Khan; Saba Qamar; Asma Abbas; Saba Faisal; Bindiya; Firdous Jamal; Mustafa Qureshi
- Theme music composer: Naveed Wajid Ali Nashaad
- Opening theme: "Tera Pyar Nahi Bhoole" by Shafqat Ali Khan
- Country of origin: Pakistan
- Original language: Urdu

Production
- Producer: Rafique Ahmad Warraich
- Production location: Lahore
- Editor: Ishfaq Yousaf
- Camera setup: Multi-camera setup
- Production company: SMR International

Original release
- Network: Pakistan Television Network
- Release: 2011

Tera Pyar Nahi Bhoole (Urdu: تیرا پیار نہیں بھولے , lit. 'Haven't Forgotten your Love') was a 2011 television series that aired on PTV. The series was written by Jahanzeb Qamar, directed by Fauzia Siddique, and produced by Rafique Ahmad Warraich. It stars Ahsan Khan and Saba Qamar in their third on-screen appearance after Dastan in 2010 and Pani Jaisa Pyar in the same year. The serial was quite popular among viewers and also won the Lux Style Awards for Best Television Play. The serial received seven nominations at the annual PTV Awards.

== Cast ==
- Ahsan Khan as Hadi
- Saba Qamar as Zari/Zartash
- Asma Abbas as Zara
- Bindiya as Wulusha
- Saba Faisal as Ansa
- Firdous Jamal as Agha G
- Mustafa Qureshi as Khan G
- Imran Arooj as Hasgeer
- Raima Khan
- Nausheen Agha
- Saleema Sipra

== Accolades ==
Award	Category	Recipient(s) and nominee(s)	Result
11th Lux Style Awards	Best Television Serial	Tera Pyar Nahi Bhoole	Won
11th Lux Style Awards	Best Television Actor (Terrestrial)	Ahsan Khan	Nominated
11th Lux Style Awards	Best Television Actress (Terrestrial)	Saba Qamar	Nominated
17th PTV Awards	Best Drama Production	SMR International	Nominated
17th PTV Awards	Best Director	Fouzia Siddique	Nominated
17th PTV Awards	Best Actor Jury	Ahsan Khan	Nominated
17th PTV Awards	Best Actress Jury	Saba Qamar	Won
17th PTV Awards	Best Actor Viewers	Ahsan Khan	Won
17th PTV Awards	Best Actress Viewers	Saba Qamar	Nominated
17th PTV Awards	Best Original Soundtrack	Naveed Wajid Ali Nashad	Nominated
