= Digest Writer =

- Genre: Drama
- Written by: Madiha Shahid
- Screenplay by: Umera Ahmad
- Directed by: Syed Ahmed Kamran
- Starring: Saba Qamar; Gohar Rasheed; Maheen Rizvi; Agha Ali; Zhalay Sarhadi
- Theme music composer: Raheel Fayyaz
- Opening theme: Raba Mere Haal Da Mehram Tu
- Country of origin: Pakistan
- Original language: Urdu
- No. of episodes: 24

Production
- Producers: Kashif Nisar; Qaiser Ali
- Production location: Karachi
- Running time: 36–40 minutes approx.
- Production company: Larachi Entertainment

Original release
- Network: Hum TV
- Release: 5 October 2014 – 14 March 2015

Digest Writer (Urdu: ڈائجسٹ رائٹر) is a Pakistani television series that premiered on Hum TV on 5 October 2014. The serial is penned by Umera Ahmad and directed by Syed Ahmed Kamran. It stars Saba Qamar, Agha Ali, and Gohar Rasheed.

The series received seven nominations at the 4th Hum Awards.

== Plot ==
Digest Writer is based on the life of Farida, a lower-middle-class college student whose parents prefer to focus on the education of their son, whom they wish would become a doctor. Farida herself is a talented young woman, determined to do well in life. She is a reserved outcast within her family, dreaming of her own future and success, holding on to the belief that any person can achieve whatever destiny has in store for them. At the same time, Farida's family is going through financially difficult times as she aspires to become a Digest magazine writer under the pen name "Rashk-i-Hina" (Urdu: رشک حنا) (Pride of Henna), spending sleepless nights to accomplish her dream. Her father constantly scolds her for wasting electricity at night, but she continues regardless. Farida is determined to earn money to help the family get out of their financial crisis, and seeing this, her parents become more sympathetic toward her. She goes on to befriend a banker, Shehryar Ahmed, who admires her skills, but several problems arise in their relationship.

Farida's parents wish to wed her to a cousin, Shaukat, who at the start feigns a lot of affection towards her. Farida's father forces her to marry Shaukat, although later on he discovers that he has made a terrible mistake; once married to him, Farida suffers taunts by Shaukat's family, especially in relation to her dream of becoming a digest writer. Shaukat rapes Farida to prevent her from planning to escape the marriage and restricts her from even touching a pen. At the same time, Farida receives a call from a TV channel (who have adapted her writing) to inform her about the success of her drama and propose their wish to have her write two more dramas. Farida refuses due to her family situation. Days go by and Farida finds out she is having a baby.

When the baby is born, her aunt is upset as it's a girl. Farida wants to name her child Meerab, but her aunt names the baby after her own mother, Suraya. Later on, the family falls on hard times as Shaukat's father has an accident. The family is short on money, so they ask Farida to start writing again, but they want to keep all the money to themselves. Farida, on the other hand, wants to give some money to them and some to her mom. When Shaukat finds out, his mother becomes enraged at her. Then one night, Farida finds another woman's earring in her bedroom and confronts Shaukat the next day. He admits to seeing another woman but claims it is because Farida is too busy in housework and has no time for him. Farida packs her bags and goes to her parents' house. Shaukat's family is not able to run their household without an income, so they convince Farida to return.

Time shifts to eight years on, and Farhan (Farida's brother) is now a doctor, and the family is wealthy. Farida has a son named Fahad and has become a well-known drama writer. One day, she goes to the mall and finds Shehryar there. They both talk and Farida admits to her not marrying him because she was forced to marry Shaukat. They secretly meet and Farida subsequently asks Shaukat for a divorce. She has to make a difficult decision: stay with Shaukat or marry the now seemingly more self-centred Shehryar. She decides to stay with Shaukat because of the children's preference to stay with their birth parents instead of living with some other person. Shaukat mends his ways, and Farida eventually returns his love. The story ends here.

== Cast ==
- Saba Qamar as Fareeda/Rashk-e-Hina
- Gohar Rasheed as Shaukat
- Maheen Khalid Rizvi as Jameela
- Khalid Ahmed as Mazhar Hayat
- Zhalay Sarhadi as Rida Anmol
- Farhan Ali Agha as Sikandar
- Aiman Khan as Shakeela
- Kashif Mehmood as Ayaan Junaid
- Mizna Waqas as Shazia (Fareeda's college friend)
- Agha Ali as Sheheryar
- Mehmood Akhtar as Anwar
- Sajida Syed as Zareena
- Parveen Akbar as Sajida
- Sarah Umair as Mahroosh
- Saife Hassan as Rehaan Khan
- Ali Anwar as Dr Farhan
- Ghazala Javed as Bint e Hawa

== Production ==
Initially, Gohar Rasheed declined the role in the series. However later Saba Qamar, with whom he has worked in Jal Pari, convinced him to take it on.

== Release ==
The series was released on Indian OTT platform MX Player. In July 2019, it was uploaded on Hum TV's official YouTube channel with muted music to avoid copyright infringement, which also irritatingly impacted on the dialogue, a fact which may have contributed to falling viewer numbers.

== Reception ==
=== Critical reception ===
Saba Qamar's portrayal of Fareeda was praised generally for its realistic depiction of the challenges faced by aspiring writers. In an year-ender article by the Dawn, the reviewer found the series "well-written and absorbing" and further opined on its commercial success that "this atypical serial is a deserving hit".

=== Audiences reception ===
The series was a mega hit for Hum TV in 2014–2015, with strong TRPs, 4.1 in the first episode, peaking at 5 TRPs in the fourth episode. The series also topped ratings in the UK, occasionally beating other channels, with its 22nd episode drawing 160,700 viewers.

== See also ==
- Digest magazine
- Henna
