= Yahan Pyar Nahin Hai =

Pakistani television series

- Genre: Romance, drama
- Written by: Faiza Iftikhar
- Directed by: Fahim Burney
- Starring: Saba Qamar; Junaid Khan; Mawra Hocane
- Theme music composer: Yahan pyar nahi hai
- Opening theme: Yahan pyar nahi hai, by Najam Sheraz
- Ending theme: Yahan pyar nahi hai (instrumental)
- Country of origin: Pakistan
- Original language: Urdu
- No. of episodes: 21

Production
- Producer: Faheem Burney
- Production location: Karachi

Original release
- Network: Hum TV

Yahan Pyar Nahin Hai (Urdu: یہاں پیار نہیں ہے, lit. 'There Is No Love Here') is a Pakistani drama serial that aired on Hum TV in February 2012, starring Saba Qamar, Junaid Khan, Mawra Hocane, Humaira Zaheer, and Farah Zeba as the main leads.

== Plot ==
The series tells the story of a miserable couple named Saim and Haleema. Saim does not like his wife, Haleema and never loses any opportunity to humiliate her. An egoistic, frustrated husband and wife with a never-give-up spirit, Yahan Pyar Nahi Hai is going to set all your relationship doubts to rest. Saim, the self-important husband, is played by Junaid Khan.

Saba Qamar portraying a loving and honest wife, Haleema. The show in the initial stage moves on with the daily arguments between Saim and Haleema. Saim being a doctor is a high-end individual contrary to his wife Haleema who is backward and finds it difficult to keep up with trends. Saim never respects Haleema and belittles her by behaving rudely. All of this messed up their lives, even more, when her cousin Shumaila joins them, portrayed by Mawra Hocane, and only to fan the flame.

Shumaila is one beautiful, young and intelligent (read cunning) girl who lures Saim in her love. Despite a disdained past, Saim fell for her and was unable to see her through the veil, only later when he saw her with her ex. The show has an intense and intriguing drama where Saim does not bat an eye on Haleema, continuously humiliating her belittling her. Haleema, on the contrary, is a woman of vows, honesty, and determination. She tries all she could, to make up with Saim, but fails miserably. Later, Haleema discovers her talent and copes up to the advanced society-contrary to her past where she was just a school pass out who was unable to match modern trends.

To sum it all, the story ends in a much-expected way - the honest one gets respect and the dishonest loses - it keeps the viewer glued to it. Nowhere has the show tapped the viewer's uninteresting nerve, but rather came out with real intense drama and a well-portrayed plot. The final episode, being the hammer on the nail-head, sums it all pretty well when retaliation and introspection come in. It is here that Saim realizes his mistakes.

== Cast ==
- Saba Qamar as Haleema
- Junaid Khan as Saeem
- Mawra Hocane as Shumaila
- Humaira Zaheer as Saeem's mother
- Kiran Khan as Zunera

== Broadcast ==
The series originally aired on Hum TV in Pakistan. It was also aired in India on Zindagi, from 19 October to 29 November 2015. It reran on Hum 2 (closed down since) in 2012.

== Soundtrack ==
The title track or OST is sung by Najam Sheraz.

Yahan Pyar Nahin Hai - OST

Soundtrack album by Najam Sheraz
- Released: 25 April 2012
- Recorded: 2012
- Genre: Television soundtrack
- Length: (2:38)
- Language: Urdu
- Label: Hum TV

Music video
- "Yahan Pyar Nahin Hai" OST on YouTube

=== Track listing ===
No.	Title	Artist(s)	Length
1.	""Jaarejaa""	Najam Sheraz	2:38

== Critical reception ==
Afreen Seher of The News International praised the positive mother-in-law and daughter-in-law relationship, and Faiza Iftikhar's "poignantly written" and "groundbreaking" script. Sadaf Haider of the DAWN Images praised the subverting of common stereotypes and presenting a positive, progressive character of a working woman.
