= Tinkay =

Pakistani drama television series

- Written by: Syed Iqbal Hasan
- Directed by: Tariq Mairaj
- Starring: Saba Qamar; Syed Jibran; Bindiya
- Theme music composer: Sahir Ali Bagga
- Opening theme: Zaheer Abbas
- Country of origin: Pakistan
- Original language: Urdu
- No. of episodes: 11

Original release
- Network: PTV Home
- Release: 2009 – 2009

Tinkay (Urdu: تنکے, lit. 'Straws') is a Pakistani drama serial aired in 2009 on PTV Home. It was directed by Tariq Mairaj and written by Syed Iqbal Hassan.

== Cast ==
- Saba Qamar as Iman Anwar
- Syed Jibran as Farhan
- Bindiya as Zari
- Sajjad Kishwar as Anwar
- Aurangzaib
- Sadia Hayyat
- Saeed Anwar

== Awards and nominations ==
Year	Content	Award	Category	Recipient	Result
2010	Tinkay	Regional PTV Awards	Best Lyricist Regional Urdu	Asim Raza	Won
2010	Tinkay	Regional PTV Awards	Best Composer Regional	Sahir Ali Bagga	Nominated
2010	Tinkay	Regional PTV Awards	Tech.Excellence Editing	Muhammad Kashif Rana	Nominated
2010	Tinkay	Regional PTV Awards	Best Cameraman	Basharat Jaffri	Nominated
2010	Tinkay	Regional PTV Awards	Best Makeup Artist	Shehzad Hafeez	Nominated
2011	Tinkay	PTV Awards	Best Actress (Jury)	Saba Qamar	Won
2011	Tinkay	PTV Awards	Best Actress (Viewers)	Saba Qamar	Won
2011	Tinkay	10th Lux Style Awards	Best Television Play(Terrestrial)	Tinkay	Nominated
