= Besharam (TV series) =

Television series

- Genre: Drama
- Written by: Sarwat Nazir
- Directed by: Farooq Rind
- Starring: Saba Qamar; Zahid Ahmed
- Country of origin: Pakistan
- Original language: Urdu
- No. of episodes: 24

Production
- Producers: Humayun Saeed; Shehzad Nasib
- Running time: ~45 minutes
- Production company: Six Sigma Plus

Original release
- Network: ARY Digital
- Release: 10 May – 1 November 2016

Besharam (Urdu: بے شرم, lit. 'Shameless') is a 2016 Pakistani drama serial that premiered on May 10, 2016 on ARY Digital. It is directed by Farooq Rind and written by Sarwat Nazir. It stars Saba Qamar, Zahid Ahmed, Atiqa Odho, Rehan Sheikh and Fia Khan in key roles. The serial is produced by Humayun Saeed and Shehzad Nasib under their production company Six Sigma Plus.

== Overview ==
Besharam revolves around three women, Sara, Mashal and Sofia, and apart from them the serial also has Malik Raza and Zahid Ahmed as the male figures of the story. Besharam deals with the social issues of glamor industry, upper-class family, and its struggles. Haider Bakht is an aspiring politician who has plans to make the country better and lives in a small house compared to Mashal with his sister and mother. Hamna is engaged to her paternal cousin Qadeer who works in a government office and has a sister Saba. Sikandar is the brother of Haider's father who is against Haider joining politics and wants Saba to marry Haider but Haider refuses as he wants to focus on his career. After Haider refuses, Sikandar takes the decision of breaking the engagement of Humna and Qadeer. On the other hand, Mashal is a top model of Pakistan and because of this fact her father Tahir Malik who is a politician shoots himself after hearing her daughter's insult from his friends. Meanwhile, Mashal gets in a relationship with a boy named Daniyal Ahmed, however Daniyal's father (Jamal) also gets in a relationship with Mashal's mother which ends their relationship. The next night Mashal and Haider get invited to a talk show in which they have a couple of arguments leading to their marriage as they both challenge each other live. As Mashal is a daring person, she accepts the challenge and marries Haider but isn't accepted by his family. This leads to Qadeer and Humna's end of engagement and Mashal's mother to not look at her face again. Khadija insists Haider to leave Mashal as she is a model and can't adjust in the family but Mashal and Haider gradually accept themselves as a couple and to give this marriage a chance. Later on, Mashal saves Saba when she's on a photo shoot and helps Hamna in escaping from new proposals. Mashal and Haider soon settle into a comfortable married life and Haider continues to look for work. Suddenly, a political leader approaches him to help gain followers for his party. Haider agrees to take up this job but Mashal is still hesitant. The political leader gives Haider many luxurious items "in exchange for his work". Mashal is still apprehensive about all of this despite Haider's enthusiasm about giving his wife back what she once had. On a talk show, pushed by the political leader, Haider says that Mashal was a shameless woman before they got married and he is the one that gave her respect. Mashal confronts him about his statement and he still refuses to admit what he said was wrong. Mashal angrily leaves after this. The drama ends on a happy note as Haider realizes what he did was wrong, leaves the party, and is reunited with Mashal.

== Cast ==
- Saba Qamar as Mishal Tahir Malik/Mishal Haider Bakht(ex-supermodel, Tahir Malik and Sara's daughter, Sofia's maternal half-sister, Haider's wife, Khadija's daughter-in-law and Humna's sister-in-law, Mannan's half-sister)
- Zahid Ahmed as Haider Bakht (Khadija's son, Mishal's husband, Sofia's brother-in-law, Humna's brother, Qadeer and Saba's paternal cousins and Sikander and Shakira's nephew)
- Atiqa Odho as Sara (Mishal, Sofia and Mannan's mother, Tahir Malik's ex-wife, Jamal's ex-lover and Haider's mother-in-law)
- Rehan Sheikh as Tahir Malik (dead) (Mishal's father, Sara's ex-husband, Jamal's friend and Haider's father-in-law)
- Ammar Ahmed as Qadeer (Shakira and Sikander's son, Humna's ex fiancé, Saba's brother, Haider's cousin)
- Faraz Farooqui as Mannan (Mishal and Sofia's maternal half-brother, Sara's son and Haider's brother-in-law, Humna's fiancé)
- Faisal Rehman as Jamal (Daniyal Ahmed's father and ex-lover of Sara and Tahir Malik's friend)
- Fia Khan as Sofia (Mishal and Mannan's maternal half-sister, Sara's daughter and Haider's sister-in-law)
- Jinaan Hussain as Humna (Haider's sister, Mishal's sister-in-law, Qadeer's ex-fiancée, Khadija's daughter, Saba and Qadeer's paternal cousin and Sikander and Shakira's niece, Mannan's fiancée)
- Shaista Jabeen - Khadija (Haider and Humna's mother, Mishal's mother-in-law, Sikander's sister-in-law and Qadeer and Saba's paternal aunt)
- Mehmood Akhtar as Sikandar (Haider and Humna's paternal uncle, Shakira's husband, Qadeer and Saba's father and Khadija's brother-in-law)
- Farah Nadeem As Shakira (Sikander's wife, Qadeer And Saba's mother)
- Jahanzeb Khan As Daniyal (Jamal's son)
- Ghana Ali As Saba (Shakira And Sikander's daughter, Qadeer's younger sister, Haider and Humna's cousin)

== Reception ==
The series was reviewed positively, in a review Sadaf Haider of The Express Tribune states, "Besharam provides a great opportunity to explore attitudes towards certain professions, be it politicians or models and more importantly; the different criteria we use to judge men and women in our culture." In another article, the newspaper listed it among the dramas that broke the stereotypes, and praised the topics it addressed.

== Accolades ==
Award	Category	Recipients	Result	Ref.
16th Lux Style Awards	Best Television Play	Besharam	Nominated	
16th Lux Style Awards	Best Television Director	Farooq Rind	Nominated	
16th Lux Style Awards	Best Television Actor	Zahid Ahmed	Nominated	
16th Lux Style Awards	Best Television Actress	Saba Qamar	Nominated	
16th Lux Style Awards	Best Television Writer	Sarwat Nazir	Nominated	
