= Siraj-ul-Haque =

Pakistani television director

Siraj-ul-Haque Satti is a Pakistani television director, who is best known for the 2022 serial Tere Bin.

== Early life ==
Siraj is a native of Hyderabad, Sindh.

== Career ==
=== Television direction ===
Siraj began his career as an assistant director at Combine Production.

=== Literature ===
Siraj has written short stories for Urdu magazines in both Pakistan and India. In 2022, he released a novel, An Unconventional Visit, which has been described by writer Taha Kehar as "a sizzling tale that combines the ugliness of political intrigue in rural Pakistan with the splendor of new discoveries in foreign land."

== Filmography ==
=== Television serials ===
Year	Title	Lyricist	Network	Note
2010	Parsa	Yes	Hum TV	
2011	Meray Charagar		Geo TV	
2012	Roshan Sitara	Yes	Hum TV	
2013	Saari Bhool Hamari Thi		Geo TV	
2013	Humnasheen		Hum TV	
2014	Mehram	Yes	Hum TV	
2014	Bunty I Love You	Yes	Hum TV	
2014	Aik Pal		Hum TV	
2015	Tum Mere Kya Ho		PTV Home	
2016	Noor-e-Zindagi		Geo Entertainment	
2016	Dil Banjaara		Hum TV	
2017	Yeh Raha Dil		Hum TV	
2017	Daldal		Hum TV	
2018	Koi Chand Rakh		ARY Digital	
2019	Ramz-e-Ishq		Geo Entertainment	
2020	Raaz-e-Ulfat		Geo Entertainment	
2021	Fitoor		Geo Entertainment	
2022	Tere Bin		Geo Entertainment	
2022	Badzaat		Geo Entertainment	
2023	Sukoon		ARY Digital	
2025	Dayan		Geo Entertainment	
2026	Nashtar		Geo Entertainment	

=== Short films ===
Year	Title
2017	Moomal Rano

== Awards and nominations ==
Year	Award	Category	Work	Result	Ref.
2012	Hum Awards	Best Director Drama Serial	Roshan Sitara	Nominated	
2013	Hum Awards	Best Director Drama Serial	Humnasheen	Nominated	
2014	Hum Awards	Best Director Drama Serial	Bunty I Love You	Nominated	
2023	1st Drama Icon Awards	Best Director (Popular)	Tere Bin	Won	
