= Sar-e-Rah =

Pakistani television series

- Title screen
- Also known as: On the Way
- Genre: Drama
- Written by: Adeel Razzaq
- Directed by: Ahmed Bhatti
- Starring: Saba Qamar; Saboor Aly; Hareem Farooq; Sunita Marshall; Muneeb Butt
- Country of origin: Pakistan
- Original language: Urdu
- No. of episodes: 6

Production
- Executive producer: Shehla Rizwan
- Production company: iDreams Production

Original release
- Network: ARY Digital
- Release: 4 February – 11 March 2023

Sar-e-Rah (Urdu: سَرِ راہ, lit. 'On the Way') is a 2023 Pakistani television miniseries, produced by iDreams Production. It is directed by Ahmed Bhatti and written by Adeel Razaaq. Sar-e-rah narrates the stories of people from different walks of life and the societal problems they face.

== Plot ==
Sar-e-Rah shares the stories of women who are the victim of child marriages, girls who are being suffocated solely because of their gender, daughters who are unable to help their fathers as their honor will be at "stake" and transgender and intersex persons who are being humiliated for their identity.

== Cast ==
=== Main characters ===
- Saba Qamar as Rania
- Sunita Marshall as Dr.Muzna
- Saboor Ali as Rameen Haider
- Muneeb Butt as Sarang Shabbir
- Hareem Farooq as Maryam

=== Supporting characters ===
- Mikaal Zulfiqar as Amir — Muzna's husband.
- Saba Faisal as Anjum — Faraz's mother, Irfan's sister, Rania's phuppo.
- Rashid Farooqui as Irfan — Rania and Hatim's father
- Agha Mustafa Hassan as Faraz — Rania's fiancé, Anjum's son.
- Fazila Qazi as Tabinda — Rania and Hatim's mother.
- Nazli Nasr as Amir's mother — Muzna's mother-in-law.
- Mirza Zain Baig as Shozab — Rameen's love interest.
- Shaheen Khan as Amtul — Shozab's mother.
- Khalifa Sajeeruddin as Haider — Rameen and Talal's father.
- Sajid Shah as Nawaz — Shozab's father.
- Nida Mumtaz as Rameen and Talal's mother.
- Javeria Saud as Nudrat — Sarang's step-mother, Shabbir's second wife.
- Nabeel as Shabbir Ahmed — Sarang's father.
- Abdullah Ejaz as Kashif — Maryam's colleague.
- Junaid Jamshed as Hatim — Rania's younger brother.
- Farah Nadeem as Mehnaz — an NGO worker for the women empowerment, victims of domestic violence and harassment cases.
- Muhammad Ahmed as Hakaan — Sarang's step-brother, Nudrat's son.
- Faisal Shehzad as Talal — Rameen's younger brother.
- Ali Anwar as Zeerak — Maryam's teammate for presentation.
- Bisma Babar as Hadia — Maryam's teammate for presentation.
- Fahim Tejani as Umer — Maryam's client representative.
- Faisal Naqvi as Abdul Majeed Mateen — an infamous fashion designer wants to hire Rameen as model for her brand.

=== Guest appearances ===
- Salma Qadir as Nighat — mother of a victim of domestic violence.
- Hashim Butt — Faraz's father.
- Shazia Gohar — Maryam's mother.
