= Aina (2013 film) =

2013 album

Aaina
- Directed by: Sarmad Khoosat
- Written by: Sarmad Khoosat and Talha Mufti
- Based on: Aina by Nadeem Baig
- Produced by: A & B Entertainment; Tarang Housefull
- Edited by: Wajahatullah Khan
- Distributed by: Geo Films
- Release date: 2013
- Running time: 125 minutes
- Country: Pakistan
- Language: Urdu

Aaina (Urdu: آئینہ transl. Mirror) is a Pakistani romantic drama film directed and co-written by Sarmad Khoosat with Talha Mufti, and produced by Tarang Housefull and A & B Entertainment. Aaina is the remake of the 1977 film of the same name, starred by Nadeem Baig and Shabnam. The film is produced by A & B Entertainment. Film stars Faisal Qureshi, Saba Qamar and Hamza Ahsan Khan.

== Plot ==
Aaina is a love story of two hearts and two souls but from two different social classes: one being Aliya (raised in riches, the only daughter of a business tycoon) and the other being Sameer (a realistic, self-confident and a little bit arrogant middle class young man). Aliya is from an affluent family with aspirations to start her own fashion empire using her father's investment, whereas Sameer comes from an ordinary family, whose parents have died and he works as a newspaper columnist. They both meet and deeply fall in love. The differences between Sameer and Aliya's father Javaid arise right from the beginning, especially when Aliya's father criticizes Sameer for his social status and limited earning, saying his daughter's handbag costs 10,000 rupees which can be Sameer's entire month's salary. Aliya's parents, especially her father, do not approve of her marrying below her social class, so Aliya leaves home and marries Sameer. They both start their life together by visiting Sameer's parents' graves and praying for the blessings from the souls of the deceased parents. Their marriage starts out very happy, with Aliya fully content in a financially moderate lifestyle, but Sameer knows that Javaid was not really happy with this marriage, and encourages Aliya to keep distance from her parents. One day Aliya's mother visits her daughter's house with expensive presents, and offers Sameer a job at the business firm of Javaid's friend, which Sameer refuses. Not only this, he also becomes angry with Aliya about the expensive jewellery and money that Aliya's mother gives her as wedding present. Aliya also learns that her aunt and cousins are visiting from New York, so the next day, despite Sameer's hesitation, she decides to visit her parents to meet her aunt. There she reconciles with her father Javaid. Day after that, when Sameer comes home in the evening, he is surprised to see Aliya's mother, aunt and cousins at his home enjoying dinner, which Aliya's mother has ordered. They have also brought more expensive presents and her cousins mock Sameer's modest home and lifestyle. This makes Sameer very angry, and after the guests leave Aliya and Sameer have a violent argument ending with Sameer physically pushing Aliya and slapping her by mistake. In response, Aliya leaves to go back to her father's house. Next day, Sameer goes to her father's house to bring her back, but is met at house entrance by Aliya's father Javaid, who misinforms him that Aliya does not want to see Sameer again and wants a divorce from him. Shocked and disheartened, Sameer leaves, saying that if Aliya wants a divorce she can send the divorce papers and he will sign, but he will not be the one to initiate the divorce.

On the other side, Aliya wants to talk to Sameer, and is waiting for him in hopes that he will come to take her back to his house. But her father deceives her too and tells her that he had visited Sameer but Sameer insulted him in front of his friends and said that he is going to divorce her. This shocks Aliya; she later learns that she is pregnant and refuses to go through abortion or divorce Sameer, who is unaware of her pregnancy. Despite numerous pleas to meet Sameer, Javaid does not allow and Aliya has a painful pregnancy. Come time of delivery, Aliya's father plans to give away the child to an orphanage, but Aliya's mother begs Javaid to not do that, so he agrees to give the child to Sameer with promise that he will never try to contact Aliya. Sameer agrees to take care of child himself and still refuses to initiate divorce. The film takes a very sad turn at that point esp. when Sameer carrying the baby to his house and singing the sad version of the song and remembering those happy days with Aliya. On the other side, Javaid lies to Aliya that the baby has died. This comes as a tremendous shock to Aliya and she somewhat loses her mental balance. Her parents send her away to New York for recovery. After a couple of years the baby Ali is now grown up living a happy life with his father Sameer, and being very sensitive and curious about his mother. Whereas, Aliya's mental instability grows day by day, so her mother asks Aliya's father to bring Aliya back to Pakistan and let her visit her baby's grave, which would perhaps help her accept the loss. Next day they all visit a graveyard, unbeknownst to them that Sameer and Ali are visiting the graveyard as well, as it's the same place where Sameer's parents are buried. Javaid hopes to show Aliya a baby's grave, which cannot be found making Aliya more upset. Then Aliya sees a little boy (who is in fact her son Ali) in the graveyard and leaps towards him. Ali tells her that he is visiting his grandparent' graves, and this brings back Aliya's memory making her realize that those are graves of Sameer's parents, and this little boy must be her son. At this time, Sameer shows up at his parents graves, and sees Aliya and her parents there. This results in a verbal altercation between Sameer and Javaid, revealing the truth that it was Aliya's father who had actually planned Aliya and Sameer's separation, and who had lied to her that her child is dead. Aliya turns angrily and snaps at her father. Her mother says at this moment "You have not slapped your father, but you have actually slapped that mentality that believes in differences between poor and rich". Then she asks Javaid to let Aliya go. Aliya runs after Sameer and movie ends with Aliya and Sameer's very emotional reconciliation at the graveyard I.e. the same spot where they had once started the journey of their married life together.

== Cast ==
- Faisal Qureshi as Sameer
- Saba Qamar as Aliya Javaid
- Firdous Jamal as Javaid (Aliya's Father)
- Hamza Ahsan Khan as Ali (Sameer and Aliya's son)
- Ali Ansari

== Soundtrack ==
Aina

Soundtrack album by Rahat Fateh Ali Khan, Shaan and Sunidhi Chauhan
- Length: 37:45
- Language: Urdu
- Producer: A & B Entertainment

Aaina songs are sung by Rahat Fateh Ali Khan, Aamir Zaki, Shaan and Sunidhi Chauhan.

Track listing
No.	Title	Singer(s)	Length
1.	"Mujhe Dil Se Na Bhulana"	Rahat Fateh Ali Khan	5:23
2.	"Kabhi Mein Sochta Hoon"	Shaan	5:38
3.	"Ruthey Ho Tum"	Shaan and Sunidhi Chauhan	5:32
