= Kamli (2022 film) =

- Theatrical Poster
- Urdu: کملی
- Directed by: Sarmad Khoosat
- Screenplay by: Fatimah Sattar
- Based on: A short film by Mehar Bano
- Produced by: Sarmad Khoosat; Kanwal Khoosat
- Starring: Saba Qamar; Sania Saeed; Nimra Bucha; Hamza Khawaja
- Cinematography: Awais Gohar
- Edited by: Saim Sadiq; Nadeem Abbas
- Music by: Saad Sultan
- Production company: Khoosat Films
- Distributed by: Distribution Club; IMGC
- Release date: 3 June 2022
- Country: Pakistan
- Language: Urdu

Kamli (Urdu: کملی; lit: Mad) is a 2022 Pakistani drama film directed by Sarmad Khoosat, who co-produced it with Kanwal Khoosat under the banner Khoosat Films. Based on a short film by Mehar Bano, the additional story and dialogues were by Khoosat himself. It stars Saba Qamar, Sania Saeed, Nimra Bucha and debutant Hamza Khawaja in lead roles. Kamli revolves around the intertwining stories of three women and their restrained desires. The film released theatrically on 3 June 2022 and opened to positive reviews from critics.

== Plot ==
Hina lives alone with her visually impaired sister-in-law Sakina as her husband Saqlain had gone to Bahrain eight years ago for better prospects. She waits for his return for years but he has not come back. Along with some of the other girls of the neighborhood, she goes to Zeenat's house who is a painter, and the girls work as muses for her. Zeenat has some disturbance and restlessness in her life as she has no child with her husband Malik Nadir.

One day, on returning from her house, Hina slips into a lake, but is rescued from the water by a man named Amaltas. The two connect instantly there, attract and develop a relationship over the span of days. They both fall for each other, and she starts spending most of her time with him.

One day, she goes to Zeenat's house with Sakina where an aalima tells the people there that a woman whose husband is unknown, could marry after four years after completing her Iddah. Sakina gets angry over it and forbids her from working in her house. After a few days, Zeenat comes to their house with a marriage proposal of her husband for Hina. Sakina lashes out at Zeenat and later physically beats Hina, saying that she was already suspicious of her and Mr. Malik having an affair.

Sakina eventually decides to get Hina married to Mr. Malik, and reveals to her that Saqlain had died in an accident shortly after he left for Bahrain eight years ago, but she could never come to terms with the news. She locks Hina up to prevent her from leaving the house until her period of Iddah is over. Hina, frustrated, sets the room on fire using Kerosene, and Sakina is forced to open the lock. Hina runs away to elope with Amaltas, only to find his cabin empty. His painted handprints on the door from earlier are also no longer there, revealing that he had never been a real person.

She goes back home to Sakina, puts her head on her lap and asks her to tell the folk tale about Princess Harmala who was saved from. The house slowly burns down, and we see a shot of Zeenat burning polaroids, including those of Amaltas. As Sakina tells the story, Hina goes over to the small pool in their balcony slowly submerging herself in the water.

There are two interpretations of the ending. The first is that Hina imagined Amaltas, fantasizing of herself as the folk-tale character of Princess Harmala. She had imagined Amaltas based on the photos she has seen at Zeenat's. As shown in the end, Hina knew how to swim all along and did not need to be rescued the day she met Amaltas. The second interpretation is that Amaltas is a ghost who appears to desperate women, gives them hope and then abandons them. He must have appeared to Sakina, who recognized his smell on Hina. He must also have appeared to Zeenat, who sadly burns his photo in the end.

== Cast ==
=== Lead ===
- Saba Qamar as Hina Saqlain
- Sania Saeed as Sakina
- Nimra Bucha as Zeenat
- Hamza Khawaja as Amaltas

=== Recurring ===
- Omair Rana as Malik Nadir
- Iman Shahid as Noori
- Adeel Afzal as Usman
- Razia Malik as Khala Naseem
- Sarmad Khoosat as Sahir Beragi (voice only)
- Samiya Mumtaz as Aalima (cameo)

== Production ==
In September 2019, Saba Qamar signed up for Sarmad Khoosat's second feature film Kamli. According to Qamar, Kamli is her fist project which she took on without reading the script, and decided to sign it just after hearing its song "Naina". Besides Qamar, Sania Saeed and Nimra Bucha were also cast in this film; it was their second feature film collaboration with Khoosat after his directorial debut Manto (2015). Debutant Hamza Khawaja was selected to portray the male lead opposite Qamar. The principal photography began in the first week of October, lasted for two months, and was held in Kallar Kahar. Khoosat revealed that the film would be a tragic love story.

The film is based on a short film by actress Mehar Bano, with additional story and dialogues by Khoosat himself and screenplay by NCA graduate Fatimah Sattar in her debut work as a screenwriter. Saad Sultan composed the music of the film who earlier composed Laiyaan Laiyaan for Jackson Heights (2014). The film is edited by Saim Sadiq and Nadeem Abbas. Awais Gohar, who previously worked with Khoosat for Aakhri Station was the director of photography of the film.

== Soundtrack ==
The music of the film is composed and produced by Saad Sultan. Lyrics are written by Shakeel Sohail, Bulleh Shah, Izzat Majeed, Anjum Qureshi and Sohail Shahzad. Kamli's music tells a story of its own. It also pays homage to Reshma jee with Maina Tu, bringing back her melodious voice at a turning point in the film.

Track listing
No.	Title	Singer(s)	Length
1.	"Mukhra"	Atif Aslam	3.39
2.	"Aag"	Amna Rahi, Farah Naz, Shamim Akhtar, ft. Zeb Bangash	3.16
3.	"Kaash"	Zeb Bangash, ft. Sohail Shahzad	4.28
4.	"Naina"	Sohail Shahzad	3.32
5.	"Paani"	Nimra Gilani, Zenab Fatimah	4.04
6.	"Mainu Tu"	Reshma	5.54

== Release ==
Initially planned to release on Eid-ul-Fitr 2020, the theatrical release of the film was postponed due to COVID-19 pandemic. The film was released on 3 June 2022. The Pakistan Film Society hosted special screenings of film in Lahore and Karachi on 8 November 2026.

=== International Screening ===
The film was screened at Indus Valley International Film Festival 2022 in Chandigarh where Saba Qamar won best actress award for her performance. It was also screened at the 52nd International Film Festival Rotterdam from 31 January to 2 February 2023. Kamli was screened at the Unspoken Mental Health Film Festival in London on 11 October 2026, with director Khoosat and members of the film's team in attendance for a post-screening discussion.

=== Home media ===
The film had a Television Premier on 7 January 2023 on Hum TV. Kamli made its UK television debut on Channel 4 as part of the channel's South Asian Film Season. The film aired in the early hours of Tuesday, 10 September 2024. Following its broadcast, it was made available to stream on Channel 4's streaming platform.

== Reception ==
=== Critical reception ===
The film was lauded by critics and analysts across Pakistan. Something Haute’s Manal Khan wrote, "Kamli is an important achievement, for everyone." The Express Tribune's Simran Siraj wrote that the film would remind you of "the mirrored wall between your reality and desires." Mohammad Kamran Jawaid of Dawn Images praised the acting performances of the actors especially of Qamar, Saeed and Bucha and termed it as a film that deserves The Oscar submission. While praising Saeed's performance he wrote, "Words fail to describe the understated detail she brings to Sakina". Maheen Sabeeh of The News International especially praised the Khoosat's direction along with cinematography and music. Saneela Jawad of Daily Times said it a cinematic masterpiece and praised the Khoosat's direction, his way of dealing with the taboo topics.

== Accolades ==
Year	Ceremony	Category	Recipient	Result	Ref.
2022	Indus Valley International Film Festival	Best Film Actress	Saba Qamar	Won	
2022	Sunday Special Icon Awards	Best Actress Of The Year	Saba Qamar	Won	
2022	Pakistani Cinema Awards 2022	Best Film	Kamli	Won	
2022	Pakistani Cinema Awards 2022	Best Actress	Saba Qamar	Won	
2022	Pakistani Cinema Awards 2022	Best Supporting Actress	Sania Saeed	Won	
2022	Pakistani Cinema Awards 2022	Best Musician	Saad Sultan	Won	
2022	Pakistani Cinema Awards 2022	Best Lyrics	Sohail Shahzad for Naina	Won	
2022	Pakistani Cinema Awards 2022	Best Male Playback	Sohail Shahzad for Naina	Won	
2022	Pakistani Cinema Awards 2022	Best Female Playback	Zeb Bangash for Kaash	Won	
2022	Pakistani Cinema Awards 2022	Best Story	Fatimah Sittar	Won	
2023	22nd Lux Style Awards	Best Film (Viewers' choice)	Kamli	Won	
2023	22nd Lux Style Awards	Best Film (Critics' choice)	Kamli	Nominated	
2023	22nd Lux Style Awards	Best Film Actress	Saba Qamar	Won	
2023	22nd Lux Style Awards	Best Film Director	Sarmad Khoosat	Won	
2023	22nd Lux Style Awards	Best Film Playback Song	Mainu Tu	Nominated	
2023	Minsk International Film Festival	Best Film - Viewers' choice	Kamli	Won	
2023	Minsk International Film Festival	Best Actress	Saba Qamar	Won	
2023	Minsk International Film Festival	Best Director	Sarmad Khoosat	Won	
2023	DC South Asian Film Festival	Best Director	Sarmad Khoosat	Won	

== See also ==
- List of Pakistani films of 2022
