= Sangat (TV series) =

Television series

- Written by: Zafar Mairaj
- Directed by: Kashif Nisar
- Starring: Mikaal Zulfiqar; Saba Qamar, Zahid Ahmed; Saba Faisal; Kiran Haq
- Opening theme: "Saza Hai Maiye Saza Hai"
- Country of origin: Pakistan
- Original language: Urdu
- No. of episodes: 25

Production
- Producer: Moomal Entertainment
- Running time: 30–45 minutes

Original release
- Network: Hum TV
- Release: 20 August 2015 – 4 February 2016

Related
- Mehram; Pakeeza

Sangat is a 2015 Pakistani romantic drama serial that premiered on Hum TV. The series is directed by Kashif Nisar and produced by Moomal Entertainment. It stars Mikaal Zulfiqar and Saba Qamar in lead roles and Zahid Ahmed as antagonist. It aired Thursday evenings on Hum TV. Sangat is one of the highest rated drama series of 2015 and gained high TRPs.

== Synopsis ==
Sangat revolves around the tale of Adnan (Mikaal Zulfiqar) and Ayesha (Saba Qamar) and how their lives change when Ayesha is raped by Shavez (Zahid Ahmed), giving birth to a baby girl named Sangat. On her 'Aqiqah' ceremony, Adnan's sister lights up some candles, which create smoke, and Sangat has trouble breathing. When they take Sangat to a hospital, the doctors say that she has Thalassemia, and they give a DNA test, proving that Sangat is not Adnan's daughter. At first, Adnan doesn't believe it, but later he gets another DNA test done from a different hospital, but the result is the same. Then, he confronts Ayesha, and she tells him everything she went through. At first, he asks who assaulted her, but she lies and says she doesn't know, because the attacker wore a mask. Adnan later gets drunk and stays away for Sangat. Shavez has to keep on donating blood and eventually comes closer to Sangat; playing with her, taking care of her, etc. Shavez, however, has his own problems. He wants to leave the city, but his aunt (Ayesha's mom) is telling him that he should get married and then move with his wife (Salma). After seeing Shavez emotionally attached to Sangat, Ayesha tells him not to leave and stay with her mom. Salma, on the other side, is jealous of Shavez's relationship with Ayesha and wants the marriage to proceed as quickly as possible. Shavez is having second thoughts about the wedding, as if he isn't going to move, then he doesn't need to get married and ends up in Ayesha problems. Adnan wants to stay with Ayesha, but she thinks they shouldn't, as Sangat will always be a part of her life, and therefore to reaccept Ayesha, he will have to reaccept Sangat. Adnan cannot do so, so he lets Ayesha stay in her mother's house with Shavez, unaware that he is the man who assaulted Ayesha. Ayesha lies to her mom about the operation being the problem as to why she needs some rest. Adnan's sister and mother both try to figure out why the relationship is breaking, but they are not able to as Adnan is lying about the operation money(they need a lot of money for the operation). With Ayesha and Shavez living in the same house, they are becoming even closer, and Ayesha has now had a change of heart and tries to keep her calm from Shavez. In the next episode, we see that Shavez has broken off the marriage and returns to his house to visit his mom. In a rage of anger, he decides to shoot himself, only to be begged by Ayesha not to. When Shavez disagrees, Ayesha yells and says Sangat is your daughter. Not wanting to leave his daughter, he decides to stay in the house with Sangat and finally telling her mom the truth. Luckily, he manages not to but tells Salma, who admits she is jealous of their relationship and wants to hear the truth. On the other hand, Ayesha tells Adnan's sister the truth, and she is guilt-ridden for hiding it from her mom. In the end, Adnan shoots Shavez and returns to Ayesha. He tells Ayesha, 'I killed Shavez because first he snatched you away from me, and now he was taking away my Sangat'.

== Cast ==
- Mikaal Zulfiqar as Adnan
- Saba Qamar as Aisha/Aashi
- Zahid Ahmed as Shavez
- Kiran Haq as Farah
- Samina Ahmad as Adnan and Farah's mother
- Saba Faisal as Aisha's mother
- Tariq Jameel as Shavez's father
- Adnan Shah Tipu as Maulvi
- Haseeb Khan
- Tahira Imam as Salma's mother
- Sonia Mishal as Salma
- Anjum Habibi
- Haseeb Khan
- Munazzah Arif as Aisha's aunt

== Criticism ==
The show was criticised due to its misogynistic, sexist, and regressive approach. There was controversy in the serial that the rapist was shown as an innocent man, and a married woman was attracted towards the rapist. Zafar Meraj, the creator of the play, admits that it was his failure not to convey the message correctly. He gave the reason that Hero type actor Zahid Ahmed was cast in the role of the rapist; otherwise, the impression would have been different.

== International broadcast ==
It was aired on Hum Europe in the UK, on Hum World in Canada, USA, and Australia, and on Hum TV Mena in the UAE with the same timings and premiere date. All international broadcasting aired the series in accordance with their standard times. On Hum World, reruns began 12 December 2018 Mon-Thur 09:00pm EST.

In Mauritius, the show was broadcast by MBC 2. It premiered on 20 November 2020 and aired from Monday to Friday 16:30.
