= Bunty I Love You =

- Title screen
- Genre: Romance
- Based on: Original script
- Written by: Khalil-Ur-Rehman Qamar
- Directed by: Siraj-ul-Haque
- Starring: Saba Qamar; Noman Habib; Abid Ali
- Theme music composer: Waqar Ali
- Opening theme: Mein Tumse Kis Tarah Keh Doon by Faiza Mujahid
- Country of origin: Pakistan
- Original language: Urdu

Production
- Producer: Momina Duraid
- Camera setup: Multi-Camera setup
- Running time: 60 minutes

Original release
- Network: Hum TV
- Release: 29 December 2013 – 18 May 2014

Bunty I Love You (Urdu: بَنٹی آئی لَو یُو) is a 2014 Pakistani drama serial directed by Siraj-ul-Haque, written by Khalil-Ur-Rehman Qamar and produced by Momina Duraid under Momina Duraid Productions. The drama originally aired on Hum TV from 5 January to 18 May 2014.

== Plot ==
Dania is a young girl married at 17 to the much older Patel. Patel dies 12 years later, leaving half his property to Dania. She dreams of living a free life until she hits a mobile phone snatcher, Bunty, who is much younger than her. She takes him to the hospital, spends a lot of money on his treatment, and falls for him. She is desperate for him to love her so they can marry and live happily.

Dania drops hints to Bunty that she loves him, but he doesn't realise it yet and keeps flirting with other girls. He falls for Mehwish, his best friend's sister. They both start planning their marriage. Bunty takes Dania to Mehwish's house where Dania finds out that Mehwish is not interested in Bunty but in the money. She buys Bunty from Mehwish and gives proof to Bunty.

Bunty falls for Beenish, who teaches him English although she is younger than him. They both start dating until one day, Dania finds out. Dania sends cops to Beenish's house, so Bunty runs from there. That night Dania asks Bunty what he was doing at Beenish's home; he again lies, not knowing that Dania knows the truth.

Dania always gives Bunty clues about her love, but he doesn't understand them. He goes to the beach, where he meets a girl named Sehrish. Bunty proposes to her, but she declines. Sehrish tells Bunty that he loves Dania but does not know it yet. Sehrish tells Bunty to go and propose to Dania instead. Bunty goes home and proposes to Dania. Dania does not believe him and thinks he is joking. Dania asks Bunty if he can drink poison for her. Bunty agrees and consumes the poison. Shocked, Dania keeps repeating "Bunty I Love You" till he dies of poisoning, leaving Dania alone again.

== Cast ==
- Saba Qamar as Dania
- Noman Habib as Bunty
- Abid Ali as Patel
- Saboor Ali as Mehwish
- Azfar Rehman
- Mehar Bano as Beenish
- Mehmood Akhtar as Chauhan
- Raza Zaidi
- Khawaja Saleem
- Tariq Jameel
- Mariam Ansari
- Hina Rizvi as Mehnaz
- Anita Camphor
- Munawar Saeed

== Reception ==
Saima S Hussain of The Friday Times critiqued the series for its portrayal of men as stereotypically bad characters, perpetuating a "men-are-cads" narrative, and for using domestic violence as comic relief, while also acknowledged the serial's engaging storyline and morbid fascination.

== Accolades ==
Nominated work year	Date of ceremony	Award	Category	Recipient(s)	Result
2014	9 April 2015	3rd Hum Awards	Best Drama Serial Popular	Momina Duraid	Nominated
2014	9 April 2015	3rd Hum Awards	Best Drama Serial Jury	Momina Duraid	Won
2014	9 April 2015	3rd Hum Awards	Best Actress Jury	Saba Qamar	Won
