= Pani Jaisa Piyar =

Pakistani TV series

- Title card official
- Created by: Salma Kanwal
- Written by: Moomal Shunaid
- Directed by: Sarmad Sultan Khoosat
- Starring: Saba Qamar; Juggan Kazim; Mikaal Zulfiqar; Samina Peerzada; Ahsan Khan; Babrik Shah; Samina Ahmed; Nausheen Shah
- Theme music composer: Waqar Ali
- Opening theme: "Paani Jaisa Piyar Hai Tera", performed by Sanam Marvi and Abu Mohammad
- Country of origin: Pakistan
- Original language: Urdu
- No. of episodes: 17

Production
- Producer: Momina Duraid
- Running time: 39 - 40 min. (approx.)

Original release
- Network: Hum TV
- Release: 27 January – 19 May 2011

Pani Jaisa Pyar (lit: Love Like Water) (Urdu: پانی جیسا پیار) is a Pakistani drama serial which first aired in 2011, on Hum TV. It was written by Moomal Shunaid, and directed by Sarmad Sultan Khoosat. Paani Jaisa Piyar has received mostly positive reviews.

== Plot ==
Pani Jaisa Piyar is the story of Sana, a 25-year-old girl from Faisalabad. She has two older siblings, Hassan and Dua. Sana's family used to be wealthy and of a high social class, but this all went away after the death of her father. The family's only support now is that of Hassan, who quit school at an early age in order to support the family. Sana has been engaged to Adarsh, the son of her mother's best friend Arfa ever since she was a child. However. Adarsh has been unaware of this engagement, as his parents thought that he needed to focus more on his education than on wedding plans.

Adarsh, however, is in love with Sasha, a childhood friend of his. When he tells his parents that he wishes to marry her, they refuse, saying that he is already engaged to Sana and has to leave their home if he doesn't marry her. After much deliberation, Adarsh decides that it would be best to marry Sana, as there is no point in marrying Sasha if they have no home and money.

Back in Faisalabad, Sana's brother Hassan is taken to prison after getting into a fight with boys from the neighborhood who were making inappropriate remarks towards Sana. Hassan's best friend, Saad, who has no family of his own, takes care of the 2 sisters and their mother in Hassan's absence. Saad has already told Sana that he likes her, but he has never done or said anything more on the matter as he knows that she is already engaged. Sana feels uncomfortable in his presence, but her mother, thinking that Saad will stop aiding them, makes Sana spend time with him anyway, as she believes that Saad's only feelings towards her daughter are brotherly. Saad takes Sana out to dinner one day, and he takes Sana to his house to show her around. Sana refuses at first, but says yes after Saad insists. Saad shows Sana his room, which is decorated with pictures of her, and confesses that he is in love with her. He asks for one night with her, and rapes her when she tries to run away. He takes her back home an hour or two later, telling her that he will withdraw Hassan's court case if she tells anyone, and she complies. When Hassan is acquitted, however, Sana cannot keep the truth in much longer, and tearfully tells him everything. Hassan, in anger, chases Saad to the railway and tracks and chokes him to death, being taken back to jail soon after.

Sana's mother Nuzhat wishes to wed Sana off to Adarsh as soon as possible after this, without telling him or his family about Sana's rape. But Sana tells Adarsh's mother Arfa anyway, knowing that she will break their engagement the second she hears the news. However, Arfa, who is indebted to Nuzhat because she took Arfa's daughter Dua in and raised her as her own so that Arfa could get remarried and live a pleasant life, accepts Sana. She tells Sana that she has told Adarsh everything and that he accepts her as well.

After Sana and Adarsh's wedding, Sana brings the topic up, saying how grateful she is that Adarsh accepted her knowing everything that had happened to her. Adarsh however, is unaware of the circumstances, and flips out when Sana tells him everything. He is furious that his mother tricked him like this, and believes that Sana was not raped at all, but did everything of her own free will. He begins to treat Sana horribly, and restarts his relationship with Sasha, even going so far as to have sexual relations with her. When Sana finds out that she is pregnant, Adarsh denies any possibility that the child is his, and claims that Sana must have an abortion because he doesn't want to take care of her illegitimate child. Sana, not knowing what to do after being accused of so many crimes, and still being in the aftershock of the death of her mother and hanging of her brother, attempts to commit suicide by overdosing on sleeping pills. However, Arfa and Adarsh find her just minutes after the pills take effect and take her to the hospital, and there is no harm done.

Adarsh tells his parents that he wishes to divorce Sana, and they respond by saying that it is not legal for a man to divorce his wife while she is pregnant. Adarsh retaliates by saying that this doesn't apply to him as the child is not his, and his father is outraged at this accusation. He tells Adarsh to leave the house, and he does, but not before asking that his father ask Arfa what the truth is. Arfa tells him everything, and the father is devastated to hear that he could have had a daughter to take care of all these years.

Things get worse and worse for Sana and Adarsh, finally resulting in Adarsh beating Sana until she is hospitalized. Adarsh's father kicks him out of the house, and Sana decides to go back to Faisalabad with Dua, where she has her son 2 months later. A DNA report shows that the baby is, in fact, Adarsh's son, but Sana argues that the child is hers and hers only. Arfa brings mithai to Sasha's home in celebration of her grandson, and walks in to find that Adarsh and Sasha's wedding is going on. She leaves in a fit of tears, and shows Adarsh the DNA report the next day, telling him the truth about what happened. However, Adarsh tells his mother that he will divorce Sana no matter what. Arfa, not knowing what to do, goes to Sasha and tells her the truth. Sasha, in a state of shock, leaves Adarsh.

One year later, Dua and her fiancé Arham have gotten married, and Sana and her son are living with them. The four of them come to Arfa's home to visit for Eid, in which Sana and Adarsh have an encounter. Adarsh begs Sana for forgiveness, and Sana, after reflecting over the course of the year and realizing that it would be best for her son, forgives him and begins living with him again.

== Cast ==
- Saba Qamar as Sana
- Mikaal Zulfiqar as Adarsh
- Juggan Kazim as Sasha
- Ahsan Khan as Saad
- Samina Peerzada as Arfa
- Babrik Shah as Hassan
- Nausheen Shah as Dua
- Samina Ahmad as Nuzhat
- Rizwan Ali as Arham
- Firdous Jamal as Adarsh's father
- Sumbul Shahid as Sasha's mother

== Broadcast and release ==
Pani Jaia Piyar was rebroadcast in Pakistan and aired on Hum 2 in 2013 and Hum Sitaray on 13 January 2016. In India, the show was aired by Zindagi started 9 June 2016. Previously, the show had to air under the title Dil Dhoondta Hai but the decision was later changed. In UK, the show was premiered on Hum TV Europe beginning 4 February 2017 and aired Sat and Sun 09:00pm (GMT).

=== Digital Release ===
- In July 2020, the show was released on Indian OTT platform ZEE5 to stream online.

== Controversy ==
The writer of the show, Moomal Shunaid was criticised to adapt the novel of Salma Kanwal into a tv series without being honored the writer. The critics called it a word by word copy but Momal Shunaid claimed to be the writer of this drama. Hum TV also did not put the name of Salma Kanwal on the credits of the drama.

== Reception ==
=== Critical reception ===
A reviewer from The Quint criticized the series for its problematic portrayal of rape, victim-blaming, graphic violence, and unrealistic reconciliation with an abusive husband.

=== Awards and nominations ===
Year	Awards	Category	Nominee(s)/ Recipient(s)	Result	Ref.
2012	Lux Style Awards	Best TV Director	Sarmad Khoosat	Won	
2012	Lux Style Awards	Best TV Serial - Satellite	Pani Jaisa Piyar	Nominated	
2012	Lux Style Awards	Best TV Actress - Satellite	Saba Qamar	Nominated	
