= Baraat Series =

Pakistani comedy serial franchise

- Genre: Social; Romance; Teen drama; Comedy drama
- Written by: Syed Mohammad Ahmed; Khadija Shah; Vasay Chaudhry; Bushra Ansari
- Directed by: Marina Khan; Nadeem Baig
- Creative director: Tahir Nadeem
- Starring: Bushra Ansari; Saba Hameed; Jawed Sheikh; Uroosa Siddiqui; Sana Askari; Ali Safina; Natasha Ali; Naveen Waqar; Sumbul Shahid; Hina Dilpazeer; Vasay Chaudhry
- Country of origin: Pakistan
- Original languages: Urdu; Punjabi
- No. of seasons: 4
- No. of episodes: 46

Production
- Executive producer: Nadeem Baig
- Producer: Sajjad A Gul
- Production locations: Faisalabad, Punjab; Karachi, Sindh; Lahore, Punjab
- Editor: Khurram.A.Siddiqui
- Running time: 40–43 minutes (per episode)
- Production company: Evernew Productions

Original release
- Network: Geo Entertainment
- Release: 2009 – 2012

Kis Ki Aayegi Baraat or Baraat Series is a Pakistani comedy television series developed by Marina Khan and Nadeem Baig for Geo Entertainment. Loosely based on Desi weddings, each season follows the story of four upper-class Karachiites marrying into a rich yet contrasting family from Faisalabad as they navigate through personal Sturm und Drang.

The show kick-started with Azar Ki Ayegi Baraat on 30 November 2009, followed by Dolly Ki Ayegi Baraat in 2010, Takkay Ki Ayegi Baraat in 2011, and concluding with Annie Ki Ayegi Baraat in 2012.

Indian channel Zindagi picked the production for airing it under the same name in 2015.

== Cast and characters ==
Despite the addition of some new characters in every new season, some of the actors along with characters appeared in all seasons of the series, which include:

- Bushra Ansari as Saima Chaudhry
- Jawed Sheikh as Faraz Ahmed
- Saba Hameed as Rabia Ahmed
- Samina Ahmad as Mehrunnisa
- Shehryar Zaidi as Chaudhry Nazeer Ahmed
- Natasha Ali as Dolly
- Uroosa Siddiqui as Sukaina (Sukhi)
- Raheel Butt as Nabeel
- Sana Askari as Laila Chaudhry
- Asad Siddiqui as Vicky Chaudhry

=== Azar Ki Ayegi Baraat ===
- Hassan Niazi as Azar
- Sarwat Gilani as Sila Chaudhry
- Arjumand Rahim as Soniya

=== Dolly Ki Ayegi Baraat ===
- Ayesha Omar as Sila Chaudhry
- Ali Safina as Mustaq (Takkay)
- Nausheen Masud as Saba

=== Takkay Ki Ayegi Baraat ===
- Alishba Yousuf as Sila Chaudhry
- Ali Safina as Mustaq (Takkay)
- Azra Mohyeddin as Mehr's friend
- Ahsan Khan as Azar
- Bindiya as Sukaina's mother
- Huma Hameed as Arfa
- Reema Khan as Reema
- Marina Khan as Fariha Hashim

=== Annie Ki Ayegi Baraat ===
- Naveen Waqar as Annie
- Shahzad Sheikh as Mikaal
- Alishba Yousuf as Sila Chaudhry
- Ali Safina as Mushtaq (Takkay)
- Ahsan Khan as Azar
- Hina Dilpazeer as Billo Farry Dharalla
- Vasay Chaudhry as Bobby D
- Huma Hameed as Arfa

== Development and production ==
After the success of Azar Ki Ayegi Baraat, Evernew Productions produced its sequel Dolly Ki Ayegi Baraat. This time Vasay Chaudhry was the co-writer with Bushra Ansari. It was the first time that Vasay had written a script for any series. The character of Sila was replaced by Ayesha Omar in this series.

In August 2018, news came out that Bushra Ansari had offered to write the script of the next season of the series.

== Spinoff ==
=== Mrs. Chaudhary Ka Tarka ===
In Ramadan 2021, the channel launched a cooking show featuring the character of Saima Chaudhry as a host, inviting the characters from the series as guests in each episode. The show was produced by Humayun Saeed, Hassaan Azhar, and Shehzad Nasib and was directed by Nadeem Baig. The executive producers of the show are Nadeem Baig and Irfan Malik. It was aired in the afternoon having 20-minute episodes.

== Impact ==
The series became among the inspirations of Saima Akram Chaudhry which motivated her to come up with romantic comedies such as Suno Chanda.
