= List of Takkay Ki Ayegi Baraat episodes =

Takkay ki Ayegi Baraat, a Pakistani comedy-drama directed by Marina Khan & Nadeem Baig, premiered on GEO TV on Thursday 23 June 2011 in Pakistan at its regular time slot, i.e. Thursday at 8:00 pm PST.

The drama is based on the love story of Sooki (Uroosa Siddiqui) and Mushtaq aka "Takkay" (Ali Safina) as to how they came to tie the knot of marriage but not before a whole host of twists and turns along the way. The third installment features all the characters from previous two excluding Anna (who has not appeared after the first serial). The role of Sila, played by Ayesha Omar in Dolly ki Ayegi Baraat is now played by newcomer Alishba Yousuf & the role of Azar, previously played by Hasan Niazi is now played by Ahsan Khan.

== Series overview ==
Series	Episodes	Originally aired		DVD release date	
Series	Episodes	Pilot	Finale	Region 2	Region 5
3	16	23 July 2011	6 October 2011	N/A	—N/a
