= Sana Askari =

Pakistani model and actress

- Born: Sana Askari; 23 April 1988 (age 38); Karachi, Sindh, Pakistan
- Occupations: Actress; model
- Years active: 2005 – present
- Spouse: Minhaj Ali Askari
- Children: Nyle Askari

Sana Askari (Urdu: ثنا عسکری; born 23 April 1988) is a Pakistani model and actress. She is known for portraying the character of Laila in Baraat Series.

== Early life ==
Askari grew up in America and attended Beaconhouse School. She graduated from NAPA in 2010 and did her first theatre play Adhay Adhooray under NAPA's banner.

== Career ==
Askari's first lead role was in Dareecha opposite Imran Aslam on ARY Digital. She has also appeared in the Barat Series productions Dolly ki Ayegi Baraat, Azar Ki Ayegi Baraat, Takkay ki Ayegi Baraat, and Annie Ki Ayegi Baraat alongside Bushra Ansari, Ayesha Omar, Javed Sheikh, Alishba Yousuf, Saba Hameed and Hina Dilpazeer, Khushboo Ka Ghar opposite Faisal Qureshi on ARY Digital, Ladies Park opposite Azfar Rehman on Geo TV, and Main Abdul Qadir Hoon with Fahad Mustafa, Saba Hameed and Alishba Yousuf on Hum TV. She then played the lead role of Deeba in ARY Digital's Daagh opposite Fahad Mustafa. She also appeared as a guest in Nadia Khan Show, Jago Pakistan Jago, Good Morning Pakistan. She also appeared as a contestant in Fear Factor Pakistan in which she was eliminated.

== Filmography ==
=== Acting ===
Drama
Year	Drama	Role	Channel	Notes	References
2009	Azar Ki Ayegi Baraat	Laila	Geo TV		
2010	Dolly Ki Ayegi Baraat	Laila	Geo TV		
2010	Shaista Shaista	Fiza	TV One		
2010	Parsa	Sonu	Hum TV		
2010	Main Abdul Qadir Hoon	Ayesha	Hum TV		
2011	Ladies Park	Sana	Geo TV		
2011	Ek Hatheli Pe Hina Ek Hatheli Pe Lahoo	Neha	Geo TV		
2011	Takkay Ki Ayegi Baraat	Laila	Geo TV		
2011	Dareecha	Maheen	ARY Digital		
2012	Khushboo Ka Ghar	Aimen	ARY Digital		
2012	Kash Aisa Ho	Maliha	ARY Digital		
2012	Timmy G	Herself	ARY Digital	Special Appearance	
2012	Annie Ki Ayegi Baraat	Laila	Geo TV		
2013	Daagh	Deeba	ARY Digital	Antagonist	
2013	Meri Dulari	Rubi	Geo TV		
2013	Kitni Girhain Baqi Hain	Aqsa	Hum TV		
2013	Madventures	Contestant	ARY Digital	Game show	
2014	Woh Dobara	Iman	Hum TV		
2014	Mein Soteli	Shamsa	Urdu 1		
2014	Jhaaran	Aqsa	Hum TV	Telefilm	
2015	Khuda Dekh Raha Hai	Sanam	A-Plus Entertainment	Antagonist	
2016	Nok Jhok	Zaibunnisah(zaibi)	ARY Digital		
2018	Do Biwiyan Ek Bechara		ARY Digital		
2019-20	Ghalati	Aliyah	ARY Digital		
2020	Raja Ki Raji	Bhabi	ARY Digital	Telefilm	
2020	Ghisi Piti Mohabbat	Farhat Parveen	ARY Digital	Antagonist	
2020	Faryad		ARY Digital		
2021	Mujhay Wida Kar		ARY Digital		
2021	Akkar Bakkar		Hum TV	Telefilm	
2022	Khala Garam Masala	Shaista	ARY Digital	Telefilm	
2024	Tum Bin Kesay Jiyen	Mahi	ARY Digital	Antagonist	
2025	Bahar Nagar	Fariya	Geo Entertainment		
