= Kitni Girhain Baaki Hain =

Pakistani anthology television series

- The shows's intertitle on Zindagi
- Written by: Bee Gul; Syed Atif Ali
- Directed by: Angeline Malik
- Starring: Sabreen Hisbani; Kanwar Arsalan; Farah Nadir; Madiha Rizvi; Ayesha Omer; Parveen Akbar; Faiza Hasan; Afshan Qureshi; Badar Khalil; Hiba Ali Khan
- Theme music composer: Shopner Ghor; Gulzar
- Opening theme: Kitni Girhain Baqi Hain
- Country of origin: Pakistan
- Original language: Urdu
- No. of seasons: 3
- No. of episodes: 100+

Production
- Producer: Angeline Malik

Original release
- Network: Hum TV
- Release: 27 March 2011 – present

Related
- Kitni Girhain Baaki Hain 2

Kitni Girhain Baqi Hain (Urdu: کِتنی گِرہیں بَاقی ہیں; transl. How many knots are left) is a Pakistani anthology television series produced by Angeline Malik that premiered on 27 March 2011 on Hum TV. The series is based on short stories in real-life situations. A second season premiered on 30 October 2016, on the same network but with a different cast; the third season premiered in 2023, on the same network but again with a different cast.

== Summary ==
Kitni Girhain Baaki Hain is an anthology television series conceived, produced, and directed by Angeline Malik. The series is inspired by the poetry and composition of Gulzar. The series is based on short stories about real-life situations with a sudden twist ending. The stories highlight the status of women in a patriarchal society. The series focuses on women's emotions across different age groups and social classes, who are bound by society's idea of them and fettered by its expectations.

== Series overview ==
Series	Episodes	Originally released	
Series	Episodes	First released	Last released
1	66	27 March 2011	15 July 2015
2	37	30 October 2016	20 August 2017
3	TBA	2023	TBA

== List of episodes ==
=== Season 1 (2011–15) ===
No.	Title	Directed by	Written by	Main cast	Original release date
1	"Aurat, Maa Aur Tanhai"	Angeline Malik	Bee Gul	Samina Ahmad, Faiq Khan, Eshita Syed	March 27, 2011
2	"SMS"	Unknown	Unknown	Rubina Ashraf, Mehmood Aslam, Gul-e-Rana, Kanwar Arsalan, Nabeel, Ayesha Khan	April 3, 2011
3	"Wida Na Karna Maa"	Unknown	Unknown	Samina Peerzada, Syed Mohammad Ahmed, Tooba Siddiqui, Anoushay Abbasi	April 10, 2011
4	"Samadhi"	Unknown	Unknown	Sumbul Iqbal, Syed Jibran, Moona Shah	April 17, 2011
5	"Piya Mun Ko Bhaai"	Unknown	Unknown	Bushra Ansari, Jawed Sheikh	April 24, 2011
6	"Ghulam Gardish"	Unknown	Unknown	TBA	May 1, 2011
7	"Zindagi Hai, Behne Do"	Unknown	Unknown	TBA	May 13, 2011
8	"Khauf-e-Khuda"	Unknown	Unknown	TBA	May 20, 2011
9	"Mernay Se Pehle Jannat"	Unknown	Unknown	TBA	May 27, 2011
10	"Kiran"	Unknown	Unknown	TBA	June 3, 2011
11	"Poshak"	Unknown	Unknown	TBA	June 10, 2011
12	"Dekh Kabeera Roya"	Unknown	Unknown	Imran Abbas Naqvi; Ayeza Khan	June 17, 2011
13	"Kath Putli"	Unknown	Unknown	TBA	June 24, 2011
14	"Ghutan"	Unknown	Unknown	TBA	July 1, 2011
15	"Iddat"	Unknown	Unknown	TBA	July 8, 2011
16	"Chambeli"	Unknown	Unknown	TBA	July 15, 2011
17	"Phir Wohi Zindagi Hamari Hai"	Unknown	Unknown	TBA	July 29, 2011
18	"Jala Doun Ga"	Unknown	Unknown	TBA	August 5, 2011
19	"Dum Hai"	Unknown	Unknown	TBA	August 12, 2011
20	"Yaar Ki Khushboo"	Unknown	Unknown	TBA	August 19, 2011
21	"Cigarette"	Unknown	Unknown	TBA	September 9, 2011
22	"Wohi Khuda Hai"	Unknown	Unknown	TBA	September 16, 2011
23	"Taqdeer Ka Brush"	Unknown	Unknown	TBA	September 23, 2011
24	"Tuta Hua Bazu"	Unknown	Unknown	TBA	September 30, 2011
25	"Faqat Aap Ka, Saleem"	Angeline Malik	Mustafa Hashmi	Ayeza Khan, Taqi Ahmed	October 14, 2011
26	"Nazar Ke Samne"	Unknown	Unknown	TBA	October 21, 2011
27	"Keya Naam doun"	Unknown	Unknown	TBA	October 28, 2011
28	"Pehli Si Muhabbat"	Unknown	Unknown	TBA	November 4, 2011
29	"Aik Thi Neeli"	Unknown	Unknown	TBA	November 11, 2011
30	"Tum Se Kehna Tha"	Unknown	Unknown	Sajal Aly, Jawed Sheikh, Saboor Aly	November 18, 2011
31	"Rubi Hansna Bhool Gai"	Unknown	Unknown	TBA	December 2, 2011
32	"Bojh"	Unknown	Unknown	TBA	December 16, 2011
33	"Memoirs of Shazray Ali Saif"	Unknown	Unknown	Angeline Malik	December 23, 2011
34	"Socha Na Tha"	Unknown	Unknown	Nausheen Shah, Noor Hassan Rizvi, Ismat Zaidi, Farah Nadir	December 30, 2011
35	"U Turn"	Unknown	Unknown	TBA	January 6, 2012
36	"Shah-e-Janat"	Unknown	Unknown	TBA	January 13, 2012
37	Basat	Angeline Malik	Momal Sheikh	Shamoon Abbasi; Mehwish Hayat	January 27, 2012
38	"Meri Appo"	Unknown	Unknown	Maria Wasti	February 3, 2012
39	"Koyla Bani Na Raakh"	Unknown	Unknown	TBA	February 10, 2012
40	"Tota Chasham"	Unknown	Unknown	Javeria Abbasi,	February 17, 2012
41	"Jo Mile Thori Fursat"	Unknown	Unknown	Javed Sheikh	February 24, 2012
42	"Baazi Ger"	Unknown	Unknown	Sunita Marshall	March 9, 2012
43	Khushi Kay Rang	Asif Asad	Rizwana Prince	Eshita Mehboob	March 30, 2012
44	Raaz	Shamoon Abbasi	Zubair Abbasi	Shamoon Abbasi; Ayesha Omer	April 6, 2012
45	"Zara Si Bhool"	Unknown	Unknown	Shahood Alvi; Maria Wasti	April 13, 2012
46	TBA	Unknown	Unknown	TBA	April 20, 2012
47	TBA	Unknown	Unknown	TBA	April 27, 2012
47	"Parde Mein Rehy Do"	Angeline Malik	Shahid Nizami	Sajal Aly, Saboor Aly, Babar Ali, Fauzia Mushtaq	January 3, 2013
48	"Jharan"	Asif Asad	Saira Arif	Sania Saeed, Sana Askari, Saleem Mairaj, Sara Razi	TBA
49	"Dil Aur Dildar"	Asif Asad	Dilshad Naseem	Naila Jaffri, Ayesha Gul, Sadia Ghaffar, Faiq Khan, Amir Qureshi	TBA

== Cast ==
- Mehwish Hayat
- Sabreen Hisbani as Munni's Mother
- Imran Abbas as Kabir
- Urwa Hocane as Maya
- Sajal Aly as Recurring Character
- Danish Taimoor as Sultan
- Ayesha Omer
- Angeline Malik
- Samina Peerzada as Mother in (Wida Na Karna Maa)
- Ainy Jaffri
- Noor Hassan Rizvi
- Agha Ali
- Yumna Zaidi
- Sania Saeed as Sanam
- Sadia Ghaffar
- Javed Sheikh
- Bushra Ansari
- Javeria Abbasi
- Anoushay Abbasi
- Zuhab Khan
- Ismat Zaidi
- Aamina Sheikh as Anoushoy
- Qaiser Naqvi as Amma Gi
- Hasan Ahmed
- Saba Faisal
- Azfar Rehman as Abbas
- Maria Wasti
- Hiba Ali Khan
- Mohammed Ahmed
- Maheen Rizvi
- Saboor Aly as Aimen
- Faisal Rehman
- Farhan Ali Agha
- Syed Jibran
- Zhalay Sarhadi as Aima
- Noman Ejaz
- Azfar Rehman
- Babar Khan
- Aijaz Aslam
- Eshita Mehboob Syed in (Khushi Ke Rang)
- Badar Khalil
- Shamoon Abbasi
- Samina Ahmad
- Maira Khan
- Khalid Ahmed
- Arjumand Rahim
- Afshan Qureshi
- Lubna Aslam
- Parveen Akbar
- Saba Hameed
- Humayun Ashraf
- Shehzad Sheikh
- Farah Nadir
- Alishba Yousuf
- Arij Fatyma
- Madiha Rizvi
- Nausheen Shah
- Nida Khan
- Saleem Mairaj
- Saniya Shamshad as Kiran
- Soniya Hussain
- Sana Askari
- Taqi Ahmed
- Arisha Razi
- Sabreen Hisbani
- Faiza Hasan
- Rubina Ashraf
- Kanwar Arsalan
- Shamim Hilaly
- Adnan Siddiqui
- Suhaee Abro as Komal
- Shahood Alvi
- Sunita Marshall
- Sarah Khan as Zarmina
- Sami Khan
- Tooba Siddiqui as Ainy; Episode 3
- Ushna Shah
- Feroze Khan
- Ahmed Ali Akbar
- Anoushay Abbasi
