= Dolly Ki Ayegi Baraat =

- Genre: Social; Comedy; Romance
- Written by: Vasay Chaudhry; Bushra Ansari
- Directed by: Nadeem Biag; Marina Khan
- Creative director: Tahira Nadeem
- Theme music composer: Shazia Manzoor
- Opening theme: Bally Ballay by Shazia Manzoor
- Country of origin: Pakistan
- Original language: Urdu
- No. of episodes: 17

Production
- Executive producer: Nadeem Baig
- Editors: Khurram A. Raza; Kamran Raza
- Running time: 35-40 minutes
- Production company: Evernew Production

Original release
- Network: Geo Entertainment
- Release: 5 August – 23 September 2010

Related
- Azar Ki Ayegi Baraat; Takkay Ki Ayegi Baraat

Dolly Ki Ayegi Baraat (Urdu: ڈولی کی آۓ گی بارات) is a Pakistani drama serial and second installment of the Baraat Series, aired on Geo Entertainment in 2010. The series stars Bushra Ansari, Saba Hameed, Javed Sheikh, Samina Ahmed, Natasha Ali and Raheel Butt, respired their roles from the previous season while Ali Safina and Ayesha Omer joined for this season. Directed by Nadeem Baig and Marina Khan, the script was co-written by Bushra Ansari and Vasay Chaudhry. The story revolves around the marriage and wedding plans of Azar's cousin Dolly and also focuses on the themes of cultural clash and our attitude towards the class system of society.

== Cast ==
- Bushra Ansari as Saima Chaudhry
- Javed Sheikh as Faraz Ahmed
- Saba Hameed as Rabia Ahmed
- Samina Ahmed as Mehrunnisa
- Shehryar Zaidi as Chaudhry Nazeer Ahmed
- Natasha Ali as Dolly
- Ali Safina as Mushtaq (Takkay)
- Raheel Butt as Nabeel
- Uroosa Siddiqui as Sukaina (Sukhi)
- Sana Askari as Laila Chaudhry
- Asad Siddiqui as Vicky Chaudhry
- Hassan Niazi as Azar
- Ayesha Omer as Sila Cahudhry
- Hajra Khan as Malka Rani
- Sumbul Shahid as Mustaq's mother
- Syed Mohammad Ahmed as Nabeel's father
- Ismat Zaidi as Nabeel's mother
- Nausheen Masud as Saba

=== Cameo appearances ===
- Marina Khan as Marina
- Nomi Ansari as himself

== Production ==
After Azar Ki Ayegi Baraat, Syed Mohammed Ahmed got engaged with other projects, leading directors to approach Vasay Chaudhary, who was tasked with completing incomplete episodes but ended up rewriting them.

== Accolades ==
Year	Award	Category	Recipient(s)/ nominee(s)	Result	Ref.
2011	Lux Style Awards	Best TV Actress - Satellite	Bushra Ansari	Won	
2011	Lux Style Awards	Best TV Writer	Vasay Chaudhary & Bushra Ansari	Nominated	
