= Takkay Ki Ayegi Baraat =

2011 Pakistani comedy serial franchise

- Title screen: left to right: Laila, Vicky, Mushtaq aka Takka, Sooki, Nabeel & Dolly
- Genre: Comedy drama
- Written by: Vasay Chaudhry
- Directed by: Marina Khan
- Creative director: Tahir Nadeem
- Starring: Ali Safina; Uroosa Siddiqui; Bushra Ansari; Javed Sheikh; Saba Hameed; Samina Ahmad; Shehryar Zaidi; Alishba Yousuf; Ahsan Khan; Natasha Ali; Raheel Butt; Sana Askari
- Opening theme: Chann Makhna
- Country of origin: Pakistan
- Original languages: Urdu; Punjabi
- No. of episodes: 17 (list of episodes)

Production
- Executive producer: Nadeem Baig
- Producer: EVERNEW
- Production locations: Karachi, Sindh; Faisalabad, Punjab
- Editor: Khurram A. Siddiqui
- Running time: Approximately 40 Minutes

Original release
- Network: GEO Entertainment
- Release: 23 June 2011

Related
- Dolly ki Ayegi Baraat; Annie ki Ayegi Baraat

Takkay ki Ayegi Baraat is a Pakistani comedy-drama that aired on Geo TV from June to October 2011. The third instalment of the Baraat Series, it is a successor of the hit Dolly ki Ayegi Baraat The show includes most of the characters from its predecessor, and focuses on the story of Mustaq a.k.a. Takkay and Sila's friend Sukena. Takkay ki Ayegi Baraat is written by Vasay Chaudhry who had co-written the previous series as well. The character of Sila, previously played by Sarwat Gilani and Ayesha Omar in the first and second installments respectively, is played by Alishba Yousuf. The character of Azar (played by Hassan Niazi in the previous two installments) was played by Ahsan Khan in this instalment of the series.

== Plot ==
Set around three months after Nabeel & Dolly's marriage. Sukki and Mushtaq have taken their relationship further and now have confessed to their parents to arrange their marriage. However things are not going to be as easy as they thought as Sukki’s mom has kept a condition that Mushtaq has to complete his BA degree which is quite impossible for Mushtaq and his family to accept, which causes Mushtaq's mother to refuses Mushtaq to marry Suki, causing suki and mushtaq to break up.

After which both start to look for other people to marry but both interrupt each others dates, sabotaging it. This causes further frustration on both ends. But it all comes to a head when Mushtaq's mother gets a heart attack causing Sukki and Mushtaq to soften up to each other again and Mushtaq to come to the conclusion that he can't marry Sukki if it makes his mother unhappy leaving Sukki disappointed and hurt.

Meanwhile, Faraz is on search of someone to finance his directorial debut feature film, and the only guy he finds, wants to marry Rabia's mom.Rabia’s mom and Sila try to comfort and make Rabia forget a traumatic accident that made her have a miscarriage. While Azar suffers from finding his job after losing his job when his boss fired him for not doing the wrong thing, Vicky needs to decide what he wants to do with his life & what are his feelings for Laila. In the end everything goes well Mushtaq's mother agrees on letting mushtaq complete his BA degree and Mushtaq and Sukki are married happily.

== Cast ==
- Ali Safina as Mushtaq Mela (Taka)
- Uroosa Siddiqui as Sukaina Mela (Sukhi)
- Bushra Ansari as Saima Chaudhry
- Saba Hameed as Rabia Ahmed
- Samina Ahmad as Mehr Un Nisa
- Javed Sheikh as Faraz ahmad
- Shehryar Zaidi as Chaudhry Nazeer Ahmed
- Ahsan Khan as Azar Chaudry
- Alishba Yousuf as Sila Chaudry
- Sumbul Shahid as Mushtaq's mother
- Sana Askari as Laila
- Natasha Ali as Dolly
- Huma Hameed as Arfa
- Naveen Waqar as Annie
- Yasir Ali Khan as Adeel
- Bindiya as Sukaina's mother
- Raheel Butt as Nabeel
- Sohail Asghar as Mushtaq's uncle
- Reema Khan as Reema
- Manzoor Qureshi as Khalid Bhanji
- Azra Mohyeddin as Mehr's friend
- Asad Siddiqui as Vicky Chaudry
- Marina Khan as Dr Fariha Hashim

== Production ==
According to Ali Safina, the producer, Sajjad Gul, told him during the filming of Dolly Ki Ayegi Baraat that his next installment, Takkay Ki Ayegi Baraat, would focus on him, as he believed Safina was his lucky charm, after his impressive performance as Takkay.

=== Location ===
The current series have been shot in Karachi & Faisalabad in accordance with the previous series. A preview of the Karachi Fashion Week was also shown in the first episode.

== Soundtrack ==
The title song was sung by Shazia Manzoor & Raju from the band Rhythm And Bhangra (RNB) & four promotional videos was advertised on GEO. The song titled Chan Makhna is said to be medley of Shazia's popular song Chan Makhna & Wari Warsi (another popular song that has been sung in many version across India & Pakistan). The promotional video featured the complete cast of the drama except Manzoor Qureshi. The complete song was featured in Episode 16 of the serial & featured special appearance from Reema Khan to promote her film Love Mein Ghum. Meera also appeared for a guest appearance in the song.

== Reception ==
Takkay ki ayegi baraat received more 18,000 likes on Facebook & received a rating of 4.5/5 from TVKahani.com which praised the acting of Manzoor Qureshi & Bushra Ansari, but criticized a weaker plot as compared to Dolly ki ayegi baraat & the low limelight bestowed upon characters like Dolly, Azar, Sila, & Rabia, in the next season this problem was improved, because of Immense popularity the whole series was also aired in India on channel Zee Zindagi.

== Sequel ==
TV Kahani stated that due to the highest ratings achieved by Takkay Ki Ayegi Baraat on GEO, EVERNEW has also made a sequel Annie Ki Ayegi Baraat which has weddings of Laila with Vikky, Nani with Khalid Bhanji and Annie with Mikaal.

== Awards and nominations ==
- 11th Lux Style Awards-Best TV Actor - Satellite-Ali Safina-Nominated
- 11th Lux Style Awards-Best TV Play - Satellite-Nominated
