= Karachi Fashion Week =

Annual fashion event in Pakistan

Karachi Fashion Week is a fashion week held in Karachi, Pakistan. It is the country's largest fashion display event. It has been hosted annually since 2008 and coincides with the international and local spring and summer peak buying season.

== Karachi Fashion Week 2011 ==
The third Karachi Fashion Week was held in 2011 from October 6–9. It was organized by Excellent Events and Entertainment (Pvt) Ltd. (Triple-E) under the aegis of the Pakistan Fashion Council (PFC), with support from both the International and National Chapter Pakistan of the World Fashion Organization (WFO). Veteran stylist Tariq Amin was the creative and aesthetic consultant of KFW and, later, Islamabad Fashion Week.

== Karachi Fashion Week 2013 ==
The fourth Karachi Fashion Week was held in 2013 from January 27–29 . It was a 'by invitation' fashion trade event. Apart from establishment fashion designers and retail brands, Karachi Fashion Week 2013 had a large focus on emerging talent, providing them with the opportunity to showcase their collection on a professional runway, thus the physical and creative platform to truly maximize their exposure. This opportunity enabled aspiring designers to debut their collection in a fashion showcase and provided them with networking opportunities with international and local buyers and media.

== See also ==
- Lahore Fashion Week
- Dubai Fashion Week
- Milan Fashion Week
- Shanghai Fashion Week
