= Rubber Band (TV series) =

2005 Pakistani television sitcom

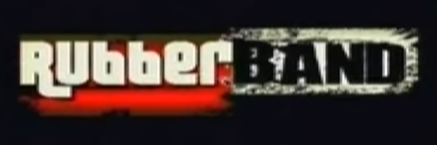
- Title screen
- Genre: Sitcom; Comedy; Rockumentary
- Written by: Vasay Chaudhry
- Directed by: Ahmed Ali Butt
- Starring: Ahmed Ali Butt; Vasay Chaudhry; Ismail Tara; Tariq Amin; Fazila Kaiser
- Opening theme: Rubber Band performed by The Rubber Band
- Country of origin: Pakistan
- Original languages: Urdu; English

Production
- Production locations: National College of Arts, Lahore
- Running time: approximately 20 minutes

Original release
- Network: ARY Digital; ARY Musik
- Release: 2005 – 2014

Related
- Jutt and Bond

Rubber Band is a Pakistani sitcom that first aired on ARY Digital in 2005. It was written by Vasay Chaudhry and directed by Ahmed Ali Butt, who also stars in the series. The series is set at the National College of Arts in Lahore and centres on a group of college students with an interest in music. Following its initial run on ARY Digital, the series was also broadcast on ARY Musik, a sister channel. According to the list of ARY Digital programmes, the series aired between 2005 and 2014.

== Plot ==
The series follows a group of students at a Lahore arts college who share a passion for music. Storylines address themes common to Pakistani college life, including peer pressure, relationship difficulties, and ragging. The series also incorporates parodies of well-known Pakistani musicians and music videos.

== Cast ==
- Ahmed Ali Butt
- Vasay Chaudhry
- Ismail Tara
- Tariq Amin
- Saami Muzzafar
- Abbas Hassan
- Bobby Jazavi
- Saad Azhar
- Maheen
- Fiza Anwar
- Muhammad Ali Jaan

== Production ==
The series was filmed at the National College of Arts in Lahore. Each episode runs for approximately twenty minutes. The opening theme is a medley drawing on songs by Pakistani acts including Noori, Fuzön, and Junoon, combined with original material performed by The Rubber Band. The series title takes its name from a real Pakistani alternative rock band of the same name, of which Ahmed Ali Butt was a member and in which he performed alongside Abid Khan, Salman Albert, and Waqar Khan.

The series followed Ahmed Ali Butt and Vasay Chaudhry's earlier collaboration on Jutt and Bond, a sitcom that had aired on Indus Vision.
