= Lahore Fashion Week =

Lahore Fashion Week (ہفتہ مد لاہور) is the second largest fashion week event in Pakistan, after Karachi Fashion Week, which is held annually in the city of Lahore. Pakistani fashion designer Mehmood Bhatti has praised the fashion week and called it an answer to the "futile efforts of extremists to enforce fear."
