= Vasay Chaudhry =

Pakistani screenwriter, actor, director, producer, host and comedian

- Born: 12 November 1981 (age 44); Lahore, Punjab, Pakistan
- Education: National College of Arts
- Occupations: Actor, writer, humorist, Television presenter
- Years active: 2000–present
- Spouse: Mahera Shah (m. 2008)
- Awards: See below

Vasay Chaudhry (Punjabi, Urdu: واسع چوہدری; born on 12 November 1981) is a Pakistani screenwriter, actor, director, producer, host, and comedian. He is best known for writing sitcoms and comedy-dramas for Pakistani televisions. He is also known for writing films. He wrote Main Hoon Shahid Afridi and Jawani Phir Nahi Ani. While Mai Hoon Shahid Afridi was an average success, Jawani Phir Nahe Ani went on to become the highest grossing film of Pakistan cinema and broke box office records while earning more than 490 million at the box office. He also wrote Jawani Phir Nahi Ani 2, which was released on 2018 Eid al-Adha and broke the all time biggest box office grosses record. It also went on to become the first Pakistani film to make 700 million rupees worldwide. Chaudhry is also known for hosting the comedy show, Mazaaq Raat, on Dunya News from 2015 to 2023.

== Early life and education ==
Chaudhry was born on 12 November 1981 and lives in Lahore.

His paternal grandfather, Chaudhary Eid Muhammad, worked in the world of movies before Partition, establishing Lahore's famed Ratan Cinema in 1945, cinema which would later be owned by Chaudhry's father. Because of Partition, Chaudhary Eid Muhammad had to move to Lahore from Ambala, where he ran cinemas as he did in Dehradun as well while he used to do bookings of the shows as far as Delhi. Chaudhary Eid Muhammad's son-in-law Afzal was the brother of famed villain actor Aslam Pervaiz.

He completed his A-levels studies from Lahore College of Arts and Sciences. Chaudhry enrolled himself at Government College University (Lahore) for a bachelor's degree but ended up graduating from University of Punjab, Lahore. Later, he began an MBA at Lahore School of Economics but dropped the course after the first semester. He later earned an MMA (Master's in Multimedia Arts) degree at National College of Arts.

He married Mahera Shah in 2008 and the couple have three daughters together.

== Career ==
Chaudhry started his career in 1998 when he did a theatre play called Desperado. He recalls, "I had just a 45-second role in it! So I started off with a role – that calling it a cameo would be a disgrace! I began to pursue theatre seriously when I went to LACAS for my A-levels where I met Zain Ahmed (actress/director Samina Ahmad's son) and acted and assisted him on his play, Blood wedding". Afterwards, he went on to become head of the Dramatics Club in LACAS and directed an old Urdu play called Bari Dair Meherban Aatay Aatay for the Rafi Peer Theatre International Theatre Festival in 1999.

Chaudhry's first writing venture for television was a sitcom called Jutt and Bond in 2001, starring Fawad Khan in lead role along with Ahmad Ali Butt and Farah Tufail. It was television adaptation of his theatre play of the same name performed in 2000. Chaudhry approached Younis Butt to write the series; when he refused, Chaudhry wrote the show himself. He recollected the memories of Jutt and Bond while speaking to a newspaper "So, then I sat down to make the decision and thought about all the terrible dramas I have seen in my life. I thought about how bad could my writing really is, decided to give it a shot and wrote Jutt and Bond."

In 2010, after establishing himself in 25-minute sitcom business, he wrote his first long TV serial Dolly ki Ayegi Baraat, which turned out to be a huge commercial and critical hit. He continued writing long TV serials after success of Dolly. Chaudhry in an interview stated that he has started enjoying writing for film and TV more than sitcoms. Chaudhry's most famous TV plays as a writer include Timmy G, Dolly Ki Ayegi Baraat, Takkay Ki Ayegi Baraat, Inspector Khojee, Kash Tu Mera Baap Na Hota, Yeh Shaadi Nahi Ho Sakti, telefilm Armaan and Jackson Heights (drama). He terms his Eid Special play Kash Tu Mera Baap Na Hota which aired on Geo TV, 2011, as one of his personal favourite work along with Inspector Khojee and Jackson Heights. In cinematic work, he debuted with the script and screenplay writing for Main Hoon Shahid Afridi; it was declared a commercial hit of Pakistani cinema, 2013, and garnered accolades from critics and audience alike.

Chaudhry has been seen in TV commercials from time to time, prominent ones include MCB ad and Zong. Chaudhry wrote in the Herald (Pakistan) as a film reviewer and critic for a brief period, during 2002–03. Since then he has occasionally contributed towards writing on Pakistani media and cinema in Pakistan's leading newspapers like Pakistan Today, The Express Tribune and The News.

Chaudhry in one interview explained the reason for writing as "only to bring the people's attention to the various character types that exist amidst us. It is important to be a responsible role model but for most people, it is easier to pick ideas off the internet and ape them."

Chaudhry believes in self-censorship but insists "My target has always been to entertain people; I am not into "artistic stuff" as far as my work is concerned, at least not now. Even when I was doing theatre, I wasn't into it. I suppose it's because I am influenced by entertainment films of the 80s and 90s". He regards Anwar Maqsood and Mushtaq Ahmad Yusufi as his gurus in comedy writing and laments the lack of fresh ideas and wit in majority of current comedies. Being a strong believer in originality he was quoted saying "It's mostly foreign concepts that we are picking up and then trying to localize and obviously failing. We need to learn to improvise rather than copy ideas."

== Reception ==
Chaudhry has been praised in the Pakistani press as a writer uniquely in touch and comfortable with Punjabi culture. He is a firm believer of "self-censorship" and calls himself old school when it comes to the views regarding a writer's moral responsibility towards his audiences. He credits this to his training in a pre-cable TV world and asserts that he "refrains from [writing] obnoxious jokes."

== Television ==
=== Writing ===
Chaudhry has contributed as a writer in various TV shows:

Year	Show	Channel	Notes
2001	Jutt and Bond	Indus TV, Channel G	Sitcom, 102 Episodes
2001	Motor Chalay Pum Pum	Pakistan Television Corporation	Sitcom, contributed writing
2002	Yaraana Purana		Sitcom, contributed writing
2004	Jallywood		Sitcom, 7 episodes
2005–8	Rubber Band (TV Series)	ARY Digital	Sitcom, 176 Episodes
2006–7	Urban Desi	Aaj TV	Sitcom, Co-writing with Ali Kazmi, 65 Episodes
2006	Inspector Khojee	Pakistan Television Corporation	Sitcom, 52 Episodes
2009	Yes Sir	A-Plus Entertainment	13 Episodes
2010–12	Timmy G	ARY Digital	Sitcom, 116 Episodes
2011	Kash Tu Mera Baap Na Hota	Geo TV	Eid special long play
2010	Dolly Ki Ayegi Baraat	Geo TV	Telenovela 17 Episodes, Chaudhry's First long TV series
2011	Takkay Ki Ayegi Baraat	Geo TV	Telenovela 16 Episodes
2012	Annie Ki Ayegi Baraat	Geo TV	Telenovela 19 Episodes
2013	Yeh Shaadi Nahi Ho Sakti	ARY Digital	Telenovela 27 Episodes
2013	Armaan	Geo TV, PTV	Telefilm
2013	Abhi Tou Main Jawan Hoon	Geo TV, PTV	Telefilm
2014–15	Jackson Heights	Urdu 1	Telenovela
2014	Bad Times	A-Plus Entertainment	
2013–16	Hum Awards	Hum TV	Script writing and hosting of the show
2012	Dolly ki Aa Gai Baraat	Geo TV	Telefilm
2016	ARY Film Awards	ARY Digital	Script writing and hosting of the show

=== Acting ===
Year	Show	Character	Channel	Notes
2004	Cafe Chill		Geo TV	
2005	Tamasha Ghar (Hari Bhari)		PTV	
2005–2008	Rubber Band (TV Series)	Ali Toor	ARY Digital	
2004	Jallywood			
2006	Inspector Khojee	Himself	PTV	
2006–07	Urban Desi		AAJ TV	
2009	Yaasu Panju Har		ARY Digital	
2010	Na jaane kyun	Haider	PTV	
2011	Kash Tu Mera Baap Na Hota	Ifran	Geo TV	
2012	Annie Ki Ayegi Baraat	Bobby D	Geo TV	
2009–13	Timmy G	Timmy G	ARY Digital	
2013	Silvatain	Mikaal	ARY Digital	
2013	Armaan	Danny	PTV & Geo TV	
2014	Kahani Raima Aur Manahil Ki	Wahaj	Hum TV	
2014	Pyarey Afzal	Dr. Sibtain	ARY Digital	
2014	Nazdeekiyan	Faiq	Ary Digital	
2015	Ishq for Sale	Shehenshah	Hum TV	
2016	Mann Mayal	Ifti	Hum TV	
2019	Love u Jatta		Film	
2021	Absolutely Knot	Haseen Khalid	Telefilm	

=== Hosting ===
Year	Program	Channel	Notes
2005–2006	Bekaar Singh Dey Naal	Channel G	
2013–2015	Hum Awards	HUM TV	
2015–2023	Mazaaq Raat	Dunya News	Replaced Noman Ijaz
2016	Lux Style Awards	Geo TV	Chaudhry wrote and hosted a segment with Fawad Khan and Ahmad Ali Butt
2021	Ghabrana Mana Hai	ARY	A 13 episode interview show hosted and scripted by Chaudhry
2023	Gup Shup	SAMAA	

=== Direction ===
Year	Program	Channel
2004	Jallywood	

=== Production ===
Year	Program	Channel
2009	Yes Sir	Adaptation of the British showYes Prime Minister

=== Guest appearances ===
- 2011: The Morning Show with Huma Amir Shah as himself
- 2014: Mehman Qadardan as himself
- 2014: Cocktail Dawn News as himself
- 2014: Mazaaq Raat as himself
- 2015: Tonite with HSY as himself
- 2015: Good Morning Pakistan (Team Jawani Phir Nahi Ani-Eid Special) as himself
- 2015: Jeeto Pakistan (Team Jawani Phir Nahi Ani Special) as himself
- 2016: Salam Zindagi with Faysal Qureshi as himself
- 2016: Star Iftar with Sarmad Khoosat as himself
- 2020: Say it all with iffat omer

== Filmography ==
Key
	Denotes films that are currently in cinemas
†	Denotes films that have not yet been released

Year	Film	Role	Writer	Actor	Notes
2013	Main Hoon Shahid Afridi	–	Yes	No	
2015	Jawani Phir Nahi Ani	Sheikh	Yes	Yes	Film debut as an actor
2018	Jawani Phir Nahi Ani 2	Sheikh	Yes	Yes	
2022	London Nahi Jaunga	Harry	No	Yes	
2025	Love Guru		Yes	Yes	Guest Appearance

== Theater ==
Year	Drama	Role	Notes	Ref.
2000	Jutt and Bond			
2004–2005	Oop Singh			
2006	Inspector Khojee			

== Awards and nominations ==
Year	Film/Drama	Role	Awards	Category	Result	Ref.
2005			1st Indus Drama Awards	Best Sitcom Drama Writer	Nominated	
2011	Dolly Ki Ayegi Baraat	writer	10th Lux Style Awards	Best Writer	Nominated	
2013	Armaan	actor	Tarang Housefull Awards	Best Supporting Actor	Won	
2014	Main Hoon Shahid Afridi	writer	1st ARY Film Awards	Best Dialogue Writer Award	Won	
2016	Jawani Phir Nahi Ani	writer	2nd ARY Film Awards	Best Dialogue Writer Award	Won	
2016	Jawani Phir Nahi Ani	writer	2nd ARY Film Awards	Best Screenplay Writer Award	Won	
2016	Jawani Phir Nahi Ani	writer	2nd ARY Film Awards	Best Story Award	Won	
2016	Jawani Phir Nahi Ani	actor	2nd ARY Film Awards	Best Actor in a Supporting Role Award	Nominated	
2016	Jawani Phir Nahi Ani	actor	2nd ARY Film Awards	Best Star Debut	Nominated	
2016	Jawani Phir Nahi Ani	actor	Lux Style Awards	Best Supporting Actor	Nominated	
