= Pak-China Friendship Centre =

Pakistan-China Friendship Centre (Urdu: مرکز دوستی پاکستان و چین, Chinese: 巴中友好中心) is an art, conference and exhibition centre in Islamabad, Pakistan. It is developed with the help of China–Pakistan relations. Its construction was started in April 2005 when the Premier of the State Council of the People's Republic of China Wen Jiabao visited Pakistan. It was inaugurated on December 18, 2010, by the Pakistani Prime Minister Yousaf Raza Gillani and Chinese Premier Wen Jiabao. Currently it is running by the Ministry of Culture.

== Zohaib Kalwar Construction ==
Centre was started building in April 2005 with the help of People's Republic of China, 48,562 m^{2} (522,720 sq ft) land was allotted by Capital Development Authority (CDA) in 2004 for the centre. Its approximately cost on construction is Rs. 3 billion, comprises on an auditorium with 800 seats, conference rooms, dancing halls, exhibition and art centre. Centre's design was made by China IPPR International Engineering Corporation and constructed by Shanghai Group. Eight conference halls with 200-250 seats, 105 residential rooms and three dancing halls are also being constructed now. In February 2013 CDA decided to establish a state-of-the-art modern cinema hall at the centre.

== Exhibitions ==
- Developing 8 Countries – 2012
- Islamabad Fashion Week – 2012
- National Book Fair – 2012
- Pak-China Business Forum – 2013 (COMSATS)
- Pakistan Super League franchise Islamabad United's opening ceremony which was held on 30 January 2016.
