= Meri Shehzadi =

2022 Pakistani television series

- Urdu: میری شہزادی
- Inspired by: The real life story of Diana, Princess of Wales
- Written by: Zanjabeel Asim Shah
- Directed by: Qasim Ali Mureed
- Starring: Urwa Hocane; Ali Rehman Khan; Farhan Saeed; Sonia Mishal; Atiqa Odho; Najiba Faiz
- Country of origin: Pakistan
- Original language: Urdu
- No. of episodes: 28

Production
- Executive producer: Momina Duraid
- Producer: Momina Duraid
- Production company: MD Productions

Original release
- Network: Hum TV
- Release: 22 September 2022 – 1 April 2023

Meri Shehzadi (transl. My Princess) is a 2022 Pakistani drama television series written by Zanjabeel Asim Shah, directed by Qasim Ali Mureed and produced by Momina Duraid. It is loosely based on the life story of Diana, Princess of Wales, ex-wife of then Prince and now King Charles III. It stars Urwa Hocane, Ali Rehman Khan, Atiqa Odho and Sonia Mishal with Farhan Saeed in a special appearance.

It was the final on-screen appearance of veteran actor Qavi Khan before his death in March 2023.

== Plot ==
Dania is a quiet, scholastic girl raised by her grandparents with much affection and love as her mother died in her childhood. Her grandmother blames her father, Salahuddin as he remarried and ignored his daughter due to his loyalty towards his second wife and their son. Her stepmother forbids her father to meet her.
Chief Minister of the province, Riaz Uddin, the older brother of Salahuddin, due to deteriorated health decides to marry off his son Shehroze with Dania, so that he can stay here permanently, not leaving for U.S.A. and could focus on his political career like him.
Soon after, Riaz Uddin dies and Dania marries Shehroze. On her first wedding night, it is revealed to her that Shehroze already has an American wife, Cam, with whom he has a son also.
Meri Shehzadi (old name Meri Shehzadi Diana) is based on the true story of Lady Diana, Princess of Wales.

== Cast ==
Name	Role	Notes
Urwa Hocane	Dania Khan née Shehroze	based on Diana, Princess of Wales
Ali Rehman Khan	Shehroze	Dania's Cousin and husband; based on Prince Charles
Sonia Mishal	Cam	1st wife of Shehroze and a citizen of USA; based on Camilla Parker Bowles
Farhan Saeed	Dr. Hasan	based on Hasnat Khan
Qavi Khan/ Manzoor Qureshi	Mr. Sanaullah	Dania's Grandfather
Atiqa Odho	Shahana	Chief Minister of Sindh, Shehroze's mother, aunt, and mother-in-law to Dania. Based on Queen Elizabeth II
Shamim Hilaly	Safia	Dania's grandmother
Shabbir Jan	Riaz Uddin	Ex Chief-minister
Nauman Masood	Salahuddin	Dania's father
Najiba Faiz	Almas	Salahuddin's 2nd wife and Dania's stepmother
Anjum Habibi	Sharfu	Sanaullah's servant
Moazzam Ali Khan		Chairman of the party
Azra Mohyeddin	Hasan's mother	
Sameera Hasan	Bibi	Shahana's friend

== Production ==
=== Background and development ===
In October 2021, screenwriter Zanjabeel Asim Shah in an interview said that she is very hopeful that her upcoming project Meri Shehzadi Diana will be a revolutionary project. In September 2022, it stated in a press release that the main character of the series, Dania is inspired by Diana, Princess of Wales and the character will be a political leader and philanthropist like her.

=== Casting ===
In June 2022, Farhan Saeed confirmed that he and Urwa are part of it. In same month, there were reports that Imran Abbas is also part of the project. However, in August 2022, Galaxy Lollywood reported that both the male leads, Saeed and Abbas have been opted out of the project. Ali Rehman Khan has replaced the Saeed while Bilal Abbas Khan may replace Abbas. About Saeed's casting in the series, the director hoped to cast him in a surprise character on his availability. The other cast members include Atiqa Odho, Qavi Khan, Sonia Mishal and Najiba Faiz. From the 18th episode onwards, Manzoor Qureshi replaced Khan who had to leave for Canada for his treatment, where he eventually died. Thus, it marked his last on-screen appearance.

== Reception ==
While reviewing the first episode, a reviewer from Galaxy Lollywood praised the direction with stating the execution as crisp, and storyline as fresh. Mag - The Weekly praised the performances of Hilaly and Qavi Khan but criticised Hocane's performance, stating that she has same expressions in each scene.

== See also ==
- List of programs broadcast by Hum TV
