= Chaandni Raatain =

2002 Pakistani television series

- Written by: Seema Ghazal
- Directed by: Muhammad Javed Fazil
- Starring: Faryal Gohar; Javed Sheikh; Humayun Saeed; Mahnoor Baloch; Aminah Haq; Tamanna; Safia Khairi; Jahanzeb
- Country of origin: Pakistan
- Original language: Urdu
- No. of seasons: 1
- No. of episodes: 13

Production
- Producer: Afreen Baig

Original release
- Release: March 2002 – 2002

Chandni Raatein (also spelled Chaandni Raatain) (lit. 'Moonlit Nights') is a 2002 Pakistani drama centered on certain South Asian cultural backgrounds, and issues such as polygamy, motherhood and the distanced mother and daughter-in-law bond. The show aired on Pakistan Television in 2002, and repeat-telecasted from the same channel in 2008.

== Plot ==
Head of her family, Bee Jan (Safia Khairi) has her own strict set of rules and cultural values, which she enforces in her home with zeal and zest. The all-mighty but too traditional mother has two sons, Aamir (Javed Sheikh), who is married to Abginey (Faryal Gohar); and Aasim (Humayun Saeed), who is unmarried.

Aamir and Abginey are childless, despite eight years of happy marriage. Seeing how Abginey can not bear a child, Bee Jan decides to marry her elder son off to a younger, prettier girl. A submissive son with an almost scary mother, Aamir can not stand up and fight for Abginey. The result is his marriage to Maha (Mahnoor Baloch).

Maha is a rude, unorthodox girl, who lives life the way she wants, and clearly refuses to follow Bee Jan's rules. Bee Jan is angry but, when Maha becomes pregnant, all of her fury vanishes. Abginey is still childless, and her position in the house continues to deteriorate as Maha treats her like filth.

It is during these circumstances that Abginey's London-residing family - her parents (Badar Khalil and Shehryar Zaidi) and her younger sister, Zarmeeney (Aaminah Haq) - pay a surprise visit to Abginey. They are shocked to learn of Aamir's second marriage, which Abginey had not told them of. They try hard to take Abginey back to London with them, but she refuses outright.

Maha, meanwhile, wants Aamir's younger brother, Asim, to marry her cousin, Iraj. Defying Bee Jan and Aamir, Asim declares his love for Zarmeeney. Bee Jan is afraid that Zarmeeney might, like sister Abginey, be infertile, but Asim refuses to listen. They marry and, despite a lot of problems, come together as a happy couple in the end.

A subplot also reveals how Maha had been married previously, and has a son from that marriage.

== Reception ==
"The role of a woman towards/against/supporting [another woman]' has been called the 'essence of the drama."

In 2008, Chandni Ratein was repeatedly telecasted on PTV Home. The drama was aired from Monday to Friday for thirty minutes each day during the Matinee Time show, which re-telecasts quality television serials to provide home, family entertainment.

== Cast ==
- Faryal Gohar as Abginey Aamir (Abi) - Aamir's first wife (Badi Dulhan)
- Mahnoor Baloch as Maha Aamir - Aamir's second wife (Choti Dulhan)
- Humayun Saeed as Asim
- Javed Sheikh as Aamir
- Aminah Haq as Zarminay - Abginey's younger sister married to Asim
- Safia Khairi as Aamir's mother
- Zaheen Tahira as Bee Jee
- Badar Khalil as Abginey's mother
- Latif Kapadia
- Kulsoom Sultan
- Tamanna as Bubbo
- Jahanzeb as Jalal

== Production ==
Chaandni Raatain was produced by Afreen Baig and directed by Muhammad Javed Fazil, who previously collaborated for Kabhi Kabhi Pyar Mein. It was written by Seema Ghazal, who wrote the entire serial in just thirteen days.

== Awards and nominations ==
The series won two awards at the 2nd Lux Style Awards ceremony.

Year	Award	Category	Result	Nominee	Ref.
2003	2nd Lux Style Awards	Best TV Play	Won	Afreen Baig	
2003	2nd Lux Style Awards	Best TV Actor	Won	Humayun Saeed	
2003	2nd Lux Style Awards	Best TV Actress	Nominated	Faryal Gohar	
2003	2nd Lux Style Awards	Best Supporting Actress	Nominated	Safia Khairi	
