= Najiba Faiz =

Pakistani actress (born 1988)

- نجیبه فېض
- Born: Najiba Faiz; 1 August 1988 (age 37); Kunduz, Afghanistan
- Other name: Najeeba Faiz
- Education: Abdul Wali Khan University
- Occupations: Actress; TV host; Journalist; Model
- Years active: 1996 – present
- Employer: Hum TV Network
- Television: Sang-e-Mah; Sang-e-Mar Mar; Mohabbat Khawab Safar
- Political party: Solidarity Party of Afghanistan
- Website: https://najibafaizofficial.com/

Najiba Faiz (Pashto: نجیبه فېض; Urdu: نجیبہ فیض; born 1 August 1988) is an Afghan-born Pakistani television host, television and film actress, known for playing variety of notable characters in films and television, mostly in Pakistan and Afghanistan. She began her career as a child artist, and later starred in television serials such as Sang-e-Mar Mar and its second trilogy Sang-e-Mah. Faiz later hosted a morning show on Hum Pashto 1.

== Early life ==
Her father is an Afghan immigrant who migrated to Pakistan in the 1980s. She grew up mostly in Peshawar, and later moved to Karachi and Islamabad. Faiz started her career with working on a children program "Storee"ستوری, which aired on PTV. In 2002, she started her acting career with "Rogh Lewani", a Pashto serial, where she played a secretary of Ismail Shahid (Maanay). The role helped her rise to stardom and served as a launching pad for her career.

== Career ==
After the launch of the maiden Pashto channel, AVT, in 2004, Najiba Faiz returned to the industry. She hosted programs and acted in various drama serials. Since then, she has acted in several plays including Sang-e-Mar Mar, which earner her critical praise. She worked in two other dramas, Mohabbat Khawab Safar and Sangsar which also aired on Hum TV. In Saawan, her role as a grief-stricken mother that fights all odds to reunite with her son was highly praised by critics. Najeeba had a viral moment in the 2017 Pakistan Super League match between Quetta Gladiators and Peshawar Zalmi, where photos and videos of her crying at tense moments of the match were widely shared and talked about on social media.

Najeeba Faiz also worked in Afghanistan for three years. There, apart from acting and hosting many different shows, she was also the host for the Afghan version of Who wants to be a Millionaire.

== Filmography ==
=== Television series ===
| Year | Title | Role | Notes |
|---|---|---|---|
| 2002 | Dil Ruba | Dil Ruba | |
| 2002 | Rogh Lewani | Dil Ruba | |
| 2004 | Parhar | Husan | |
| 2007 | Da Ba Manay | Gulbadan | |
| 2008 | Sur Shaal | Saira | |
| 2009 | Taojan Badoona | Wazimah | |
| 2010 | Bacha Kana Akhtar | Kharo | |
| 2010 | Angoori | Haya Jan | |
| 2011 | Sham Say Pehlay | Sania | |
| 2011 | Rok Lo Aaj Ki Raat Ko | Farwa | |
| 2012 | Be Bangro Lasoona | Shaista | |
| 2012 | Kaala Jadoo Season 2 | Zara | |
| 2012 | Ap Ke Saawan Barse | Shumail | |
| 2012 | Quddusi Sahab Ki Bewah | Zareena | |
| 2012 | Kuchh Ishq Tha Kuchh Majboori Thi | Shahana | |
| 2013 | Virasat | Saher | |
| 2016 | Funkari | Chandni | |
| 2016 | Sang-e-Mar Mar | Gulalai | |
| 2017 | Sangsar | Neelam | |
| 2017 | Mohabbat Khawab Safar | Rakhshunda | |
| 2022 | Sang-e-Mah | Harshali Kaur | |
| 2022 | Meri Shehzadi | Almas | |
| 2023 | Meesni | Humaira | |
| 2024 | Nafrat | Shagufta | |
| 2025 | Sharakat | Mahum | |

=== Telefilm ===
| Year | Title | Role |
|---|---|---|
| 2006 | Sanata | Aqsa Zafar |
| 2010 | Zara-Si-Ulfat | Nausheen |
| 2012 | Dhamak | Zareena |

=== Film ===
| Year | Title | Role | Notes |
|---|---|---|---|
| 2007 | Khuda Kay Liye | Gul Bano | |
| 2017 | Saawan | Arzoo | |

== Awards and nominations ==
| Year | Award | Category | Result | Presented by | Ref. |
|---|---|---|---|---|---|
| 2008 | AVT Khyber Awards | Best Actress | Won | ATV Awards Committee | |
| 2021 | 4th Awards UNISA Fakhre Awards | Best Actress | Won | UNISA Fakhre Committee | |
