= Meray Dard Ko Jo Zuban Miley =

Pakistani drama serial

- Also known as: Bezubaan
- Genre: Drama; Romance
- Written by: Bushra Ansari
- Directed by: Adnan Ahmed
- Starring: Anam Tanveer; Bushra Ansari; Khalid Anam; Sarwat Gillani; Shehryar Munawar Siddiqui; Behroze Sabzwari; Lubna Aslam; Mohib Mirza; Alishba Yousuf; Rohail Zaidi; Saad Imran; Hamza Ali Abbasi
- Country of origin: Pakistan
- Original language: Urdu
- No. of episodes: 19

Production
- Producer: Momina Duraid
- Cinematography: Shehzad Kashmiri
- Running time: 35 minutes
- Production company: Moomal Productions

Original release
- Network: Hum TV
- Release: 23 June 2012 – 2012

Meray Dard Ko Jo Zuban Miley (Transl. If my agony finds expression) is a Pakistani drama serial directed by Adnan Ahmad, written by Bushra Ansari and produced by Momina Duraid. It began airing from 23 June 2012 on Hum TV. The show was also broadcast in India on Zindagi under the title Bezubaan.

== Plot ==
The story of "Meray Dard Ko Jo Zuban Miley" revolves around two friends, Ahmed Ali and Abdul Rehman. Ahmed Ali is a poor shopkeeper focused on the well-being and happiness of his family and the people around him. Abdul Rehman is the affluent owner of a prosperous engineering firm. As wealthy as he is, Abdul Rehman is kindhearted and unconcerned with status. Abdul Rehman and his wife, Zakia, are devoted to caring for their deaf and mute son, Arooj. Arfa, Ahmed Ali's youngest daughter, is in love with and engaged to her maternal cousin, Junaid, which leaves Aminah Ahmed Ali's eldest daughter open for marriage.

On meeting Aminah, Abdul Rehman and Zakia fall in love with her bubbly personality and compassionate and patient nature. Ashamed to ask for Aminah's hand in marriage to Arooj at the beginning of their recently rekindled friendship with Ahmed Ali, Zakia asks her sister, Razia, for her daughter's, Neelam's hand in marriage. All is well until Zakia's brother-in-law, Kamran, plans to rob Abdul Rehman and Zakia of their fortune through Neelam's marriage to Arooj. However, Neelam and Arooj do not get married. Neelam is uninterested in Arooj, as she thinks he is boring because of his inability to speak and hear.

One morning, when Razia cleans up Neelam's bedroom, she finds a pack of cigarettes. The stress of her husband's behaviour and her daughter's detrimental lifestyle take a toll on Razia, and she suffers a heart attack. Zakia stays at her house to help her recover. Neelam lives a Westernized lifestyle of drinking, smoking, dating, and premarital sex. One evening, she is found in her house by Zakia, getting physically intimate with her boyfriend, Shiraz. Later, she finds out she is pregnant with Shiraz's child. When she is found by her parents on her bed and holding her stomach, she reveals to her parents that she is pregnant with Shiraz's child. However, Kamran sees this as an opportunity to tell Zakia that Arooj has gotten Neelam pregnant and should marry her. Throughout that day, Neelam tries to confront Shiraz about the situation; he had promised to marry her. However, she finds out Shiraz has lied about himself, his life, and their future and has left for London. Pregnant and without Shiraz, she sees abortion as her only escape route. While receiving an injection to start the process of her abortion, she passes out. When she is rushed to the hospital, she is pronounced dead.

Razia and Kamran are grief-stricken. Through his grief, Kamran realises his wrongdoings, apologises to Zakia for what he has done, and leaves Pakistan. Arfa is then sent to Karachi, where she wishes to pursue further studies. Her father agrees to send her, and Junaid helps her convince him. She resides with a classmate, Samreen, who lives the lifestyle of Neelam. Salaar, Arfa's classmate and friend of Samreen, has eyes on Arfa and even confesses to Samreen that he likes Arfa, knowing that she is engaged to Junaid. After a few days, Arfa accompanies Samreen to Salaar's house after much convincing by Samreen. Salaar offers her a drink, which is drugged. Salaar brutally rapes her, even when Arfa struggles. Samreen is arrested by the police, whereas Salaar is on the run. Arfa's condition brings depression into the family, as Arfa continuously blames herself and finds no reason to live her life anymore. After Aminah gives birth to Inaam, Arfa eventually marries Junaid through much convincing from her family members.

Arooj receives an opportunity to go to Bangkok to display his talent in photography and art, and on their way to the airport, they meet with an accident. The accident leaves Arooj handicapped, he spend xx the rest of his life in a wheelchair. Arfa, even after marriage, still thinks about the ordeal she went through and cannot forget what Salaar did to her. She sinks into depression and later gives birth to a daughter who dies of negligence.

Years pass, and Aminah meets Salaar, who calls himself Aazam under a new identity. They work together, and she is unaware of his original identity as her younger sister. Arfa gives birth to a son and promises to change and overcome her depression. Aazam proposes to Aminah, but Aminah rejects. Zakia, regretting Aminah's destiny in her marriage to Arooj, convinces Aminah to marry Aazam. When Arfa and Junaid arrive at the wedding, Arfa recognises Aazam, originally Salaar, the one who raped her and is now going to be her sister's husband. Arfa reveals Aazam's identity and slaps him for ruining her life and is now again going to destroy her sister's and thus save Aminah's life.

== Cast ==
- Alishba Yousuf as Arfa
- Sarwat Gillani as Aminah
- Shehryar Munawar Siddiqui as Arooj
- Behroze Sabzwari as Ahmed Ali
- Lubna Aslam as Shamim
- Mohib Mirza as Junaid
- Khalid Anum as Abdur Rehman
- Hamza Ali Abbasi as Salaar/Aazam
- Bushra Ansari as Zakia
- Saad Imran as Inam
- Anam Tanveer
