= Shehryar Zaidi =

Pakistani actor

- Born: Shehryar Zaidi; Lahore, Punjab, Pakistan
- Occupation: Television actor
- Known for: Kis Ki Ayegi Baraat; Sehra Main Safar; Mann Mayal
- Spouse: Nayyara Noor
- Children: Jaffer Zaidi
- Awards: Pride of Performance award by the Government of Pakistan in 2022

Shehryar Zaidi is a veteran Pakistani television actor. He is known for his acting in dramas for PTV Home and other networks.

== Career ==
He has appeared in a variety of television dramas and musical shows. He has worked with some big names of Pakistani industry. Mostly he has had roles where he has complex relationships with his children in these dramas. He has worked the most with Ismat Zaidi. He is famous for his role of Farooq in Sehra Main Safar, in which he has acted as the brother of Lubna Aslam, uncle of Ali Kazmi, and father of Zarnish Khan.

Shehryar Zaidi, together with his wife Nayyara Noor, did a music album released in 1988 by EMI Pakistan called Yaadon Ke Saaye. On this album, Shehryar Zaidi was the music composer.

== Awards and recognition ==
- Pride of Performance Award by the Government of Pakistan in 2022 for his contributions as a television actor.

== Television ==
Some of his major TV dramas are:

Year	Title	Role	Channel	Notes	Ref
2000	Na Jany Kaya Ho Gaya	Asim	PTV		
2001	Peela Jora	Nadeem	PTV		
2001	Adha Chehra		PTV		
2001	Chehray		PTV		
2002	Chaandni Raatain		PTV		
2004	Be Zaban		PTV		
2005	Jahan Basain Dildar		PTV		
2008	Chaar Chand		Geo Entertainment		
2009	Meri Unsuni Kahani		Hum TV		
2009	Meri Zaat Zarra-e-Benishan	Adil's father	Geo Entertainment		
2009	Azar Ki Ayegi Baraat	Nazeer Ahmed	Geo Entertainment		
2009	Malaal	Mahi's father	Hum TV		
2009	Mannchalay		Hum TV	(guest appearance)	
2010	Vasl		Hum TV		
2010	Man Jali		Geo Entertainment		
2010	Dolly Ki Ayegi Baraat	Waqas Chaudhry	Geo Entertainment		
2011	Neeyat	Sikandar's father	ARY Digital		
2011	Takkay Ki Ayegi Baraat	Waqas Chaudhry	Geo Entertainment		
2012	Annie Ki Ayegi Baraat	Nazeer Ahmed	Geo Entertainment		
2012	Mera Yaqeen	Maha's father	ARY Digital		
2012	Meri Behan Meri Dewrani	Naeem	ARY Digital	Ahmed & Aahad's father	
2012–13	Mera Pehla Pyar	Hamid	ARY Digital		
2013	Mere Hamrahi	Naeem	ARY Digital	Ahmed & Aahad's father	
2013	Nanhi		Geo Entertainment		
2013	Teri Berukhi		Geo Entertainment		
2013	Kankar		Hum TV		
2013	Pyaray Afzal	Samra's father	ARY Digital		
2014	Bikhra Mera Naseeb		Geo Entertainment		
2014	Bashar Momin	Rudaba's father	Geo Entertainment		
2014	Mein Bushra	Musa	ARY Digital		
2014	Dusri Bivi		ARY Digital		
2014	Arranged Marriage		ARY Digital		
2015	Tum Se Mil Kay		ARY Digital		
2015	Nikah	Rohail's father	Hum TV		
2015	Sehra Main Safar	Farooq	Hum TV		
2015	Unsuni	Quddus Bilgrami	PTV Home	Chief Manager	
2016	Choti Si Zindagi	Riaz Ahmed	Hum TV		
2016	Mann Mayal	Shahid	Hum TV	Salahuddin's father	
2016	Mera Kya Qasoor Tha		Geo Entertainment		
2017	Aisi Hai Tanhai	Hamza's father	ARY Digital		
2018	Pukaar	Samra's father	ARY Digital		
2018	Naik Parveen	Riaz Sahib	Geo Entertainment		
2018	Baba Jani	Zahoor Elahi	Geo Entertainment		
2019	Do Bol	Nafees	ARY Digital	Jahan Ara's husband	
2019	Cheekh	Sulaiman	ARY Digital	Asad's father	
2019	Khaas	Saud	Hum TV		
2019	Choti Choti Batain	Taimoor	Hum TV	Story - 4	
2019	Aas (TV drama)		TV One		
2020	Dil Ruba	Daniyal	Hum TV		
2020	Kashf	Fayaaz Ahmed, Wajdaan's father	Hum TV		
2020-2021	Dulhan	Haroon, Annie's father	Hum TV		
2021	Shehnai	Zubair, Meerab's father	ARY Digital		
2021	Chupke Chupke	Hania and Ashar's father	Hum TV		
2021	Mor Moharaan		TV One		
2021	Amanat	Safdar, Zaraar's father	ARY Digital		
2022	Dil-e-Veeran		ARY Digital		
2023	Jannat Se Aagay	Abid Mughal	Geo Entertainment		
2026	Rutba		ARY Digital		
