= Zaib-un-Nisa (TV series) =

Pakistani television series

- Written by: Azra Babar
- Directed by: Sahira Kazmi
- Country of origin: Pakistan
- Original language: Urdu
- No. of episodes: 13

Production
- Producer: Sahira Kazmi

Original release
- Network: PTV
- Release: 4 August – 3 November 2000

Zaib-un-Nisa is a Pakistani television series directed by Sahira Kazmi, based on a script by Azra Babar and first broadcast on PTV in 2000. Focused on the subject of domestic violence, the series is the journey of the eponymous protagonist from victimhood to empowerment when she leaves her abusive marriage and lives a dignified life as a single woman.

== Plot ==
The drama revolves around a woman, Zaib-un-Nisa (Zebi) who has two sisters and a brother. Zebi is married and her husband, Mehmood, is worried about unemployment and quarrels with his wife. Both live in a rented flat. A few years ago, a woman named Saba lived in this flat with her unemployed, destitute and drug addict husband. Saba's husband, Farooq used to take money from his wife for buying drugs but one day she refused. He got angry and killed Saba. A few years later, Zebi and her husband moved into the same flat. Saba's soul used to come and meet Zebi but Zebi thought Saba resides in a neighbouring flat and did not realize that she was being visited by the spirit of a dead woman. Like Saba's unhappy married life, Zebi's life in this flat also begins to suffer. One day, Mehmood beats up pregnant Zebi, causing a miscarriage. Mehmood later regrets the loss of his child and the separation of his wife.

== Cast ==
- Nida Kazmi as Zaib-un-Nisa (Zebi)
- Adnan Siddiqui as Mehmood
- Adrash Ayaz as Ali
- Asad Azmi as Imran
- Sabeen Javeri as Sofia
- Agha Jaffar as Father
- Sajida Syed as Rasheeda
- Zeba Akbar as Salma
- Mariam Ahmed as Ayesha
- Mohib Mirza as Aamir
- Naeem Siddiqui as Farooq
- Muneeza Qidwai as Samina
- Qaiser Naqvi as Mrs Khan
- Saife Hassan as Ehsan
- Ubaida Ansari as Rubina
- Safia Khairi as Sitwat Aapa
- Maryam Shah as Hina
- Sania Saeed as Saba

== Reception ==
In a review published in the Dawn Images, the performances of Nida Kazmi and Adrash Ayaz were praised.

== Impact ==
A discussion on self-actualisation in "Zaib-un-Nisa" was held in November 2019 at Olomopolo Media, Lahore, led by M.Phil scholar Muhammad Ali, exploring the serial's progressive portrayal of a woman's journey towards mental growth and independence after leaving an abusive marriage.
