= Main Abdul Qadir Hoon =

Pakistan television series

- Genre: Teen Drama
- Created by: Momina Duraid
- Written by: Sarwat Nazeer
- Starring: Fahad Mustafa; Alishba Yousuf; Aamina Sheikh; Faisal Qureshi
- Opening theme: "Main Abdul Qadir Hoon" by Ifti
- Country of origin: Pakistan
- No. of episodes: 22

Production
- Executive producer: Momina Duraid
- Running time: 45–50 minutes (per episode)
- Production company: A&B Productions

Original release
- Network: Hum TV
- Release: 18 December 2010 – 21 May 2011

Main Abdul Qadir Hoon (Urdu: میں عبدالقادر ہوں) (English: I am Abdul Qadir) is a Pakistani drama serial that aired on Hum TV every Saturday from 18 December 2010 to 21 May 2011. The serial is written by Sarwat Nazir and directed by Babar Javed. Fahad Mustafa is featured in the lead role while Faisal Qureshi, Aamina Sheikh, Alishba Yousuf, Saba Hameed and Asif Raza Mir portray supporting roles.

== Plot ==
The serial is the unique story of a young man named Abdul Qadir (Fahad Mustafa). He has a heart of gold whose life goes through many twists and turns because of people around him trying to influence him. He is an obedient son but his parents are too busy with their own lives. He befriends a girl from his neighborhood, Zareen (Alishba Yousuf), who is a spoilt and fast girl. She gradually influences him towards drinking alcohol and smoking. When he proposes to her she rejects him and a heart-broken Abdul Qadir is sent to England by his mother Meera (Saba Hameed).

In England (those episodes were actually shot in Turkey), Abdul Qadir totally immerses himself in the local culture and befriends Faiz (Faisal Qureshi), Shah Mir and Sarmad. Here accidentally he meets Nell (Aamina Sheikh) and employs her as his housekeeper. One day he attempts to be a bit too forthcoming and sociable with her, in response to this she pleads to him in the name of God and this hits him deeply. Nell gradually brings him back to religion. Abdul Qadir is so influenced with Nell that the two get married but Nell dies as she is suffering from AIDS.

After living for nine months abroad, Abdul Qadir surprises his mother on his return by sporting a beard and wearing a cap. On her inquiring, he tells her that he wants to be a religious scholar. Now Meera wants to change her son and for this asks for Zareen’s help. Zareen is now divorced twice and lives in poverty.

Zareen initially turns down Meera's offer, but afterwards, poverty gets the better of Zareen, and for the sake of money she takes her offer. Zareen runs into Abdul Qadir while jogging one day. They go out a few times. Meanwhile, Pasha, Zareen's ex-husband, finds out about the plot and blackmail's Zareen into giving him money to stop him from telling Abdul Qadir. On Zareen's birthday, Abdul Qadir goes to Zareen's house, where Pasha is already there, through an open door, Abdul Qadir overhears the plan his mother has laid out. Pasha, at this time tries to rape Zareen, but Abdul Qadir steps in and protects Zareen. Abdul Qadir soon leaves the house. His mother now wants him to marry her best friend's daughter, who initially was going to marry Jawad, an old friend of Abdul Qadir, who had extremely ill-mannered habits. Abdul Qadir notifies Meera's best friend about Jawad, and her daughter also catches Jawad in the presence of other girls.

Then Meera's best friends daughter now wants to marry Abdul Qadir, but while all this is happening, Faiz, his friend abroad is sick, and his father wants Abdul Qadir to bring him back. Abdul Qadir leaves the house without greeting his mother, she thinks that he left because of her, and that he will never come back. Meera becomes sick and is hospitalized. When she returns from the hospital, the absence of Abdul Qadir dawns upon her. She slowly comes to love everything Abdul Qadir loves. She accepts the gardener's sons gift of sweets, which he wanted to give to Abdul Qadir because the gardener's son came first in his class. The son also wants to become a Muslim, after looking up to Abdul Qadir. Soon Zareen returns to her father, and finds out Meera is sick. She visits Meera's house, where they have an emotional moment and hug each other. Meera slowly comes to realize the similarities between Zareen and Abdul Qadir. She soon develops a liking for her. Abdul Qadir returns to Pakistan after Faiz's death and finds out that Zareen is about to get married, he sadly agrees to go for the ceremony where it is revealed that the wedding is for Zareen and himself. After the wedding, Abdul Qadir gives Zareen the ring with which he wanted to propose to her years ago and then he tells her to call him Abdul Qadir instead of A.Q.

== Cast ==
- Fahad Mustafa as Abdul Qadir Mirzada: He is the titular character and the protagonist of the series. He is a mentally challenged boy without any siblings and is very quiet. He is a disturbed child because his parents often fight. He befriends Zareen, a very mean and naughty girl who teaches him very bad habits like disobeying parents, smoking and fighting with people. Abdul Qadir begins disobeying his mother because she wants him to live according to her will. Abdul Qadir falls in love with Zareen and proposes her for marriage but Zareen rejects him which causes Abdul Qadir to suffer from nervous breakdown. He is sent to Europe for further studies after recovery where he changes himself into a flirt. He makes friends with Faiz Rasool and keeps Nell Jones Abraham as his housekeeper. Nell is the daughter of a Muslim mother and often asks Abdul Qadir about Islam, which irritates him and he often shouts at her. Abdul Qadir starts to realize that Nell is right and he starts to learn about Islam and teach her about the religion. She accepts Islam and Abdul Qadir marries her but she dies at the second day as she is suffering from AIDS. Abdul Qadir returns to Pakistan as a changed person in the disguise of a Maulvi. His relatives and friends make fun of him and his mother is strictly against him but Abdul Qadir behaves gently with her and starts impressing people. Zareen is brought back into his life by Meera to convert him into the normal person but Abdul Qadir discovers his mother and Zareen's wicked plans. He leaves for England to visit his dying friend Faiz. His mother realizes that she has done wrong with him and she changes her bad behaviour with her husband and everyone else. Abdul Qadir returns to Pakistan and his parents get him married to his first love Zareen.
- Alishba Yousuf as Zareen Khan Afridi: She is the female protagonist of the series. She befriends the mentally ill Abdul Qadir but is a very mean and naughty girl. She teaches him wrong things like smoking, fighting and disobeying parents. She disrespects her elders and has bad company of Pasha and Bobby. Abdul Qadir falls in love with her and proposes her for marriage but she rejects him, which causes Abdul Qadir to suffer from nervous breakdown. Zareen's aunt complains to her parents which forces her father to fix her marriage with his friend's son. Zareen convinces her friend Pasha to marry her and they run away at Bobby's house. However, police arrests the three and Zareen's father files a case of kidnapping against Pasha and Bobby. Zareen is locked by her father but she escapes from her house after the bail of Pasha. She marries Pasha and breaks the heart of her father. Pasha proves to be a bad husband. He often beats her, insults her and wastes her money for his own uses. Zareen returns to her father's house and divorces Pasha. Zareen marries Naufil, who is a very bad husband. He often suspects her as if she is talking to Pasha. He divorces her and her father kicks her out of the house. She starts living a life of poverty when Meera discovers her and hires her to make friends with Abdul Qadir again to make him change his Maulvi lifestyle and convert back to normal. Pasha knows about all this and he starts blackmailing Zareen. He starts taking cheques from her and shows up at her planned birthday party, where the two argue about Zareen and Meera's plan. Abdul Qadir learns about it. He beats Pasha and makes him escape. Zareen realizes her mistake and ends her contract with Meera by informing her that Abdul Qadir knows about both of them. Zareen has fallen in love with Abdul Qadir but he leaves for England. Upon Abdul Qadir's return, Zareen's marriage is fixed with him by their parents.
- Faisal Qureshi as Faiz Rasul (Abdul Qadir's friend in London)
- Aamina Sheikh as Nell (Abdul Qadir's first wife and initially his maid in London)
- Sana Askari as Ayesha Zubair
- Saba Hameed as Meera Siddiqui (Abdul Qadir's mother)
- Asif Raza Mir as Abdul Qadir's father
- Tipu Sharif as Pasha (Zareen's friend and ex-husband)
- Hashim Butt as Farid Khan Afridi
- Hassan Niazi as Naufil

== Awards ==
Year	Awards	Category	Nominee(s)/ recipient(s)	Result	Ref.
2012	Lux Style Awards	Best TV Actor-Satellite	Fahad Mustafa	Nominated	
2012	Lux Style Awards	Best Original Soundtrack TV/Film	Iffti	Nominated	

3rd Pakistan Media Awards

- Nominated-Pakistan Media Award for Best TV Actor to Fahad Mustafa
- Nominated-Pakistan Media Award for Best Supporting Actress to Aamina Sheikh
- Nominated-Pakistan Media Award for Best Paramental Role to Saba Hameed
- Nominated-Pakistan Media Award for Best Negative Character to Saba Hameed

== Episode list ==
Episode	Original air date
1	18 December 2010
2	25 December 2010
3	1 January 2011
4	8 January 2011
5	22 January 2011
6	25 January 2011
7	29 January 2011
8	5 February 2011
9	12 February 2011
10	19 February 2011
11	26 February 2011
12	5 March 2011
13	12 March 2011
14	19 March 2011
15	2 April 2011
16	9 April 2011
17	16 April 2011
18	23 April 2011
19	30 April 2011
20	7 May 2011
21	14 May 2011
22	21 May 2011

== Release ==
=== Broadcast ===
- The series premiered originally on Hum TV from 18 December 2010 to 21 May 2011.
- The show re-run in Pakistan on Hum 2 in 2013 and on Hum Sitaray in 2016.
- In Canada and USA, the show airs on Hum World in 2015.
- In India, the show was aired on Zindagi, premiering on 7 March 2016 and finishing its run on 2 April 2016.

=== Digital Media ===
- From 23 July 2020, the series was made available for streaming on ZEE5 along with other Pakistani serials.
- In September 2020, the series was made available on Hum TV's YouTube Channel.
