= Zid (TV series) =

Television series

- Genre: Romance; Drama
- Created by: Momina Duraid
- Developed by: Mehroz Karim Films
- Written by: Bee Gul
- Directed by: Adnan Wai Qureshi
- Creative director: Mehroz Karim
- Starring: Ahsan Khan; Maya Ali; Angeline Malik; Humayoun Ashraf; Ismat Zaidi; Kanwar Arsalan
- Opening theme: "Aey Taash Tujhe Tujh Se" by Hadiqa Kiani
- Composer: Waqar Ali
- Country of origin: Pakistan
- Original language: Urdu
- No. of seasons: 1
- No. of episodes: 19

Production
- Producer: Mehroz Karim
- Production locations: Karachi, Sindh; Washington, D.C.
- Cinematography: Illyas Kashmiri; Azhar Ali
- Editors: Faisal, Hassam Ali, Danish Sadeeq
- Camera setup: Multi
- Running time: (33-40 minutes of airing)
- Production company: G.M Productions

Original release
- Network: Hum TV
- Release: 23 December 2014 – 3 May 2015

Zid (English: Stubbornness) is a Pakistani television drama series that debuted on Hum TV on 26 December 2014. It is written by Bee Gul, produced by Momina Duraid, and directed by Adnan Wai. It features Maya Ali, Ahsan Khan, Rabab Hashim, Imran Peerzada, and Nausheen Shah in pivotal roles.

== Summary ==
The series follows the story of Saman, a professional working woman whose father's love and care have made her stubborn, albeit headstrong. Her conservative aunt often tries to reach out to her. Saman has gotten engaged twice, and both engagements have been broken off due to Saman. For the second engagement, she went to the guy's house to break off the engagement. Following these incidents, Saman's aunt, her father's elder sister, comes with a proposal for her of a man named Omar. He is settled in the USA but is a divorcee. Her aunt decides not to tell Saman about Omar's previous marriage. Since Saman's stubbornness is well known in the family, her parents believe it best to get her married at this point and decide to accept Omar's proposal for Saman. On their wedding night, Omar decides to tell Saman of his past, and Saman reacts badly to this news and tells her parents that she does not want to move to the USA. However, her parents are unmoved by her attempts at blackmail, and she goes with her husband to the home awaiting in the USA. Saman meets the daughter of Mr Qasim, who is like a father to Omar. They become friends, and she shows Saman around. During this time, we see how weak and grave the relationship between Saman and Omar is.

== Plot ==
=== Part 1 ===
Saman is a professional working woman whose father's love and care have made her stubborn, albeit headstrong. Her conservative aunt often tries to reach out to her. Saman gets engaged twice, and both engagements break off due to Saman. For the second engagement, she goes to the guy's house to break off the engagement. Then following these incidents, Saman's aunt, her father's elder sister, comes with a proposal for her of a man named Omar. He is settled in the USA but is a divorcee. Her aunt decides not to tell Saman about Omar's previous marriage. Since Saman's stubbornness is well known in the family, her parents believe it best to get her married at this point and decide to accept Omar's proposal for Saman. On their wedding night, Omar decides to tell Saman of his past, and Saman reacts badly to this news and tells her parents that she does not want to move to the USA. But when her family tells her they are fed up with her behaviour, a deeply hurt Saman changes her decision and moves to the USA.

=== Part 2 ===
There, she meets Rukhi, the daughter of Qasim (who has taken real care of Omar since his childhood) and becomes best friends with her. Qasim and Saman share a great time, and Qasim tells Saman about his terrible past and how he used his wife, Julian. He says he started loving her, and she died listening to this. Saman gets sad. Rukhi is interested in a guy named David, and the fact he is an American disturbs Qasim a lot later onwards. Saman and Omar have a fight which leads Saman to leave her home. She starts living with Qasim and Rukhi. When Rukhi introduces Qasim to David, Qasim gets angry and throws him out of his house. It disturbs Rukhi, who is now upset with her father. Saman recalls Qasim's past, which leads him to react badly. Saman leaves the house.

=== Part 3 ===
Saman now goes to her school friend Zainab's house, who too shifted to the USA. She usually depends on money mostly. She previously broke her relationship with her boyfriend named Michael. Later, Michael asks her to patch up again, which she fully denies. She and Saman are now good friends. Rukhi leaves Qasim and says he can live on her own. She leaves the house, and Qasim is bothered. Michael is not a good guy with whom Zainab thinks to patch up. Zainab patches up with him, who is just looking for her money. She later throws Sanam out of her house. Rukhi also has to leave. She goes to Qasim, making matters worse and is kicked from there. Now both the girls are homeless.

== Cast ==
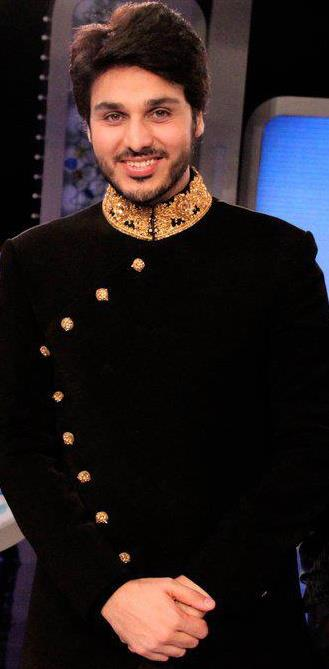
Ahsan Khan played the leading roles in the serial.
- Ahsan Khan as Omar
- Maya Ali as Saman
- Nausheen Shah as Zanaib (Zee)
- Rabab Hashim As Rukhi
- Shaz Khan As David
- Humayoun Ashraf as Raza
- Huma Nawab as Omer's mother
- Sultana Zafar as Aapa Jan
- Kanwar Arsalan as Akbar
- Hina Javed as Sonia
- Usman Peerzada as Qasim
