= Hina Javed =

Pakistani actress

- Born: 25 August 1989 (age 36); Jeddah, Saudi Arabia
- Education: Pakistan International School
- Occupations: Actress; Model
- Years active: 2010 – present
- Relatives: Sana Javed (sister); Shoaib Malik (brother-in-law)

Hina Javed (born 25 August 1989) is a Pakistani actress. She is known for her roles in dramas Jia Na Jaye, Zid, Alif Allah Aur Insaan, Sila, Pardes and Meray Paas Tum Ho.

== Early life ==
She was born on 25 August 1989 in Jeddah, Saudi Arabia to Pakistani parents, who were from the Hyderabad Deccan region of South India. She completed her school and college education from the Pakistan International School in Jeddah. Later her parents moved to Karachi and she studied at University of Karachi.

== Career ==
She made her acting debut in the ARY Digital sitcom Timmy G. She was noted for her roles in dramas Timmy G Season 2, Jia Na Jaye, Zid and Sila. Hina also appeared in dramas Kahi Unkahi, Mohabbat Khawab Safar and Shanakht. Since then she has appeared in dramas Pardes, Aulaad, Wafa Be Mol and Meray Paas Tum Ho. Hina's role as Farwah in the drama Aulaad was well received by audience and her role as Wateera in Meray Paas Tum Ho received positive reviews.

== Personal life ==
Hina's younger sisters Sana Javed and Tahmina Javed are both actresses. Hina's brother Abdullah Javed is a model. Her sister Sana is married to cricketer Shoaib Malik. Sana was previously married to singer Umair Jaswal.

== Filmography ==
=== Television ===
Year	Title	Role	Network
2011	Timmy G Season 1	Pinky	ARY Digital
2012	Timmy G Season 2	Pinky	ARY Digital
2012	Kahi Unkahi	Javeria	Hum TV
2013	Jia Na Jaye	Shermeen	Hum TV
2014	Zid	Sonia	Hum TV
2014	Shanakht	Kashaf	Hum TV
2016	Sila	Mehwish	Hum TV
2017	Mohabbat Khawab Safar	Yasmeen	Hum TV
2017	Alif Allah Aur Insaan	Alisha	Hum TV
2019	Meray Paas Tum Ho	Wateera	ARY Digital
2020	Aulaad	Farwah	ARY Digital
2021	Pardes	Rija	ARY Digital
2021	Wafa Be Mol	Fatima	Hum TV
2021	Mazaaq Raat	Herself	Dunya News
2022	Makafaat Season 4	Afsa	Geo Entertainment
2022	Nisa	Mehwish	Geo TV
2022	Dikhawa Season 3	Ishwar	Geo Entertainment
2022	Sirat-e-Mustaqeem Season 2	Sana	ARY Digital
2023	Bewafa	Nayab	Aan TV
2023	Adan	Mawra	Aan TV
2023	Dikhawa Season 4	Rahat	Geo Entertainment
2023	Sirat-e-Mustaqeem Season 3	Laila	ARY Digital
2023	Ahsaas	Areeba	Express Entertainment
2023	Adawat	Natasha	ARY Digital
2024	Dikhawa Season 5	Rahat	Geo Entertainment
2024	Teray Janay Kay Baad	Maham	ARY Digital
2024	Bismil	Madiha	ARY Digital
2025	Behkaway	Neelam	Geo Entertainment

=== Telefilm ===
Year	Title	Role
2022	Mast Mohabbat	Chanchal
