= Khushboo Ka Ghar =

Pakistani drama serial

- Genre: Drama
- Created by: A&B Productions
- Written by: Rukhsana Nigar
- Directed by: Mohsin Mirza
- Starring: Faysal Qureshi; Saima Qureshi; Sana Askari; Erum Akhtar; Urwa Hocane; Esha Noor; Anoushay Abbasi
- Country of origin: Pakistan
- Original language: Urdu

Production
- Producer: A&B Productions
- Production locations: Karachi, Pakistan
- Running time: Approx. 20 minutes

Original release
- Network: ARY Digital; Life OK
- Release: 2011 – 2013

Khushboo Ka Ghar (Urdu: خوشبو کا گھر, lit. 'House of Fragrance') is a 2012 Pakistani drama serial that premiered on ARY Digital. The show was directed by Mohsin Raza. Faysal Qureshi, Sana Askari, Raheel Butt and Anoushay Abbasi were the lead actors. Khushboo Ka Ghar was also aired on Life OK in India.

== Plot ==
This drama starts with a happy and contented lives of a young couple, and their four young children. First the father and then the mother passes away. Their extended family decides that each of their close relatives will assume the guardianship of one child each. The siblings are separated and this emotional turmoil continues till they reach adulthood. Aiman deeply resents the fact that the four are separated and wants to reunite them; there is Abeera who is more docile and sacrificing. Then there is Fiza who is a mixture of both, and Ahmed who has been pampered to death by his paternal aunt.

== Cast ==
=== Main cast ===
- Faysal Qureshi as Sikander
- Saima Qureshi as Shaila
- Sana Askari as Aiman
- Erum Akhtar as Mrs. Atif, Sarah's mother, aunt of Fiza
- Anoushay Abbasi as Fiza
- Raheel Butt as Ahmed
- Esha Noor as Abeera

=== Supporting cast ===
- Seemi Pasha
- Rashid Farooqi
- Nousheen Ahmed
- Seema Seher
- Amber Arshad
- Urwa Hocane (Cameo role)
