= Mohabbat Khawab Safar =

Pakistani drama serial

- Urdu: محبت خواب سفر
- Written by: Rukhsana Nigar
- Directed by: Syed Asim Ali
- Starring: Rabab Hashim; Mirza Zain Baig; Seher Afzal; Mehmood Aslam; Babar Khan; Hina Javed; Sangeeta; Najiba Faiz
- Theme music composer: Shabi
- Opening theme: "Zindagi Ban Gayi Aik Saza" by Natasha Beyg; Lyrics by Shabi
- Composer: Shabi
- Country of origin: Pakistan
- Original language: Urdu
- No. of seasons: 1
- No. of episodes: 35

Production
- Producer: Momina Duraid
- Production locations: Karachi, Pakistan
- Camera setup: Multi-camera setup
- Running time: ~40 minutes
- Production company: MD Productions

Original release
- Network: Hum TV
- Release: 24 April – 29 August 2017

Mohabbat Khawab Safar (Urdu: محبت خواب سفر; lit: Love, Dream, Journey) is a Pakistani drama serial based on the novel of same name by Rukhsana Nigar. It aired every Monday and Tuesday at 9:10pm PST on Hum TV from 24 April 2017 to 29 August 2017, replacing Kuch Na Kaho. It stars Rabab Hashim, Seher Afzal, Mirza Zain Baig, Babar Khan, and Mehmood Aslam

== Cast ==
- Rabab Hashim as Zareen/Neelam
- Mirza Zain Baig as Ali
- Seher Afzal as Sara
- Babar Khan as Ahsan
- Mehmood Aslam as Agha Fayyaz "Faizee"
- Faiq Khan as Mustafa
- Najiba Faiz as Rakhshunda
- Sangeeta as Dadi
- Ambar Wajid as Shaheen
- Mohsin Gillani as Azhar
- Munazzah Arif as Najma
- Hina Javed as Yasmeen
- Nasrullah Khan as Karim
- Kinza Malik as Mustafa's mother
- Azra Mohyeddin as Roshan Begum (Guest appearance)
- Taifoor Khan as Jehangir (Guest appearance)
- Mubashira Khanum as Jehangir's mother
- Fatima Shah Jillani as Laiba Aali
- Yasir Alam as Tanzeel

== See also ==
- List of programs broadcast by Hum TV
- 2017 in Pakistani television
