= Safia Khairi =

Pakistani actress (1932–2019)

Safia Khairi صفیہ خیری
- Born: Safia Khan; 4 November 1932; Lucknow, Uttar Pradesh, British India
- Died: 12 January 2019 (aged 86); Karachi, Sindh, Pakistan
- Other name: Safiya Khairi
- Education: St. Thomas' School
- Occupations: Actress; Writer; Teacher; Human Rights Activist
- Years active: 1960–2019
- Spouse: Saad Rashidul Khairi (m. 1954; died 2012)
- Children: 3
- Relatives: Uzma Baig (niece)

Safia Khairi (Urdu: صفیہ خیری) was a Pakistani actress, writer and human rights activist. She is known for her roles in dramas Kasak, Pal Do Pal, Zaib-un-Nisa, Band Gali and Chaandni Raatain.

== Early life ==
She was born in Lucknow at Uttar Pradesh in British India. Safia's father was born in Qasba Town in Uttar Pradesh and owned lands. Her father went to Aligarh for education and completed his studies from Aligarh Muslim University with a bachelor's degree in arts. After completing his studies he got married. Safia's father was a provincial servant and served in different provinces and her paternal aunt was a general secretary of the All-India Muslim League.

Safia's parents then moved to Delhi and they lived at Gurudwara Road near The Viceroy Church there she attended St. Thomas' School.

After Partition of India then she along with her family moved to Pakistan at Karachi and there she finished her education and pass the matriculate exams.

== Career ==
She became associated with Radio Pakistan in the 1960s and worked as a performer for Radio. Later she joined theatre and her associstion with theatre soon established her as a rising star, and Safia rose to prominence in late 1970s.

Safia started working as a teacher at schools and in 1970 joined political party Tehreek-e-Istiqlal, founded by Asghar Khan. She supported democracy and was a strong supporter of Zulfikar Ali Bhutto as she wanted everyone to have the right to vote and speak their thoughs and minds instead of remaining quietly. She was against marshall laws and she deeply hated the role of the army in interfering in Pakistan's politics. She remained a member of the party till 2012 when it was merged with Pakistan Tehreek-e-Insaf.

In 1992 she made her debut as an actress and appeared in drama Kasak in which she portrayed the role of grandmother the drama was written by Haseena Moin it was aired on PTV.

In 1996 she worked in drama Pal Do Pal which aired on PTV along with Asad Malik, Nadia Khan and Ali Azmat later she worked in drama Uljhan in 1996 in which she portrayed the role of a strict aunt.

In 2002 she appeared in drama Chaandni Raatain it was about certain South Asian cultural backgrounds, and issues such as polygamy, motherhood and the bond between mother and daughter-in-law. She was known for her expressions and her Urdu diction and her traditional gota-edged dupattas and old-fashioned mannerisms.

In 2006 she worked with Nadia Jamil, Rehan Sheikh and Shahood Alvi in drama Kiran Kahani which was a remake of the original series it was written by Haseena Moin it aired on PTV.

In 2012 she along with Talat Hussain and Shamim Hilaly worked in drama Band Gali which aired on PTV. Later she also wrote books about child welfare and about human rights.

== Personal life ==
She married Saad Rashidul Khairi a Pakistani Ambassador, writer and diplomat in 1954 later they had three children together including two daughters and one son. Safia's daughter Umber Khairi is a journalist, columnist, and writer who has worked in Pakistan and the UK since the 1980s.

== Illness and death ==
She was in a critical condition so she was sent to hospital and taken to ICU later her health improved so she went home. She died at her home in Karachi on January 13, 2019.

== Filmography ==
=== Television ===
Year	Title	Role	Network
1992	Kasak	Salma	PTV
1994	Aroosa	Dadi	PTV
1996	Pal Do Pal	Azra Begum	PTV
1996	Uljhan	Bua	PTV
1998	Hayat-e-Javed	Aziz-un-Nisa	PTV
1999	Saas Ki Aas	Tariq's mother	PTV
1999	Zara Pyar Say	Bibi Jan	PTV
2000	Zaib-un-Nisa	Sitwat	PTV
2001	Chaltay Chaltay	Jahanara's mother	PTV
2002	Chaandni Raatain	Aamir's mother	PTV
2006	Kiran Kahani	Safia	PTV
2008	Chaar Chand	Rehan's mother	Geo Entertainment
2012	Band Gali	Daado	PTV

=== Telefilm ===
Year	Title	Role
1999	Abba, Amma Aur Ali	Asad's mother

== Awards and nominations ==
Year	Award	Category	Result	Title	Ref.
2003	2nd Lux Style Awards	Best Supporting Actress	Nominated	Chaandni Raatain	

== Bibliography ==
Safia and Durriya Kazi authored a critically book titled The Cycle of Violence about child abuse and to spread awareness about education the booked was also published in Malaysia. She then wrote another book Ajnabi Ki Dosti Dosti Nahi about NGOs, child abuse and child protection. Later she wrote a novel titled Meri Duniya about her childhood and her acting career.
