= Rok Lo Aaj Ki Raat Ko =

Pakistani television drama series

- Written by: Faizi
- Directed by: Farooq Mengal
- Starring: Alishba Yousuf; Danish Taimoor; Sajid Hassan; Seemi Pasha; Naila Jaffri; Najiba Faiz; Suzain Fatima
- Country of origin: Pakistan
- Original language: Urdu
- No. of episodes: 18

Production
- Producer: Rashid Sami
- Production company: Koh-e-Noor

Original release
- Network: Express Entertainment
- Release: 2011 – 2012

Rok Lo Aaj Ki Raat Ko is a Pakistani television drama series, aired on Express Entertainment, directed by Farooq Mengal and written by Faizi. It stars Alishba Yousuf, Danish Taimoor, Najiba Faiz and Sajid Hassan in leading roles. The series revolves around Aayla, played by Yousuf, who bores of life due to bitterness and hardships in her life.

== Plot summary ==
Rok Lo Aaj Ki Raat Ko is a tragic love story that revolves around myth, death and hope.

Based on the concept of Trout fish, the series revolves around a girl who hails from Baltistan and later moves to another city, Karachi as she loses faith in family, life and love.

== Cast ==
- Alishba Yousuf as Ayla
- Danish Taimoor as Ali
- Sajid Hussain as Ali Sher
- Seemi Pasha
- Naila Jaffri
- Najiba Faiz as Farwa
- Suzain Fatima
- Raeed Muhammad Alam as Shani
- Ahsan Balaj
