= Islamabad Fashion Week =

Islamabad Fashion Week is a fashion week annually held in Islamabad, Pakistan. IFW was first held in 2011, run by Triple-E (Pvt.) Ltd. Tariq Amin is the creative head of IFW and Karachi Fashion Week.

== 2011 ==
First IFW was held in 2011 at Pak-China Friendship Centre, Islamabad.

== 2012 ==
The second Islamabad Fashion Week was held from April 10–12, 2012. Fashion week was held at the Pak-China Friendship Centre.
