= Nausheen Masud =

Pakistani actress (1978–2023)

- نوشین مسعود
- Born: Nausheen Masud; 15 April 1978; Karachi, Pakistan
- Died: 6 December 2023 (aged 45); Karachi, Pakistan
- Resting place: Karachi
- Other name: Nosheen Masood
- Education: Saint Joseph's College for Women, Karachi
- Occupations: Actress; Director; Producer; Psychotherapist
- Years active: 1994–2023
- Spouse(s): Imran (husband); Tariq Qureshi (ex-husband)
- Children: 2

Nausheen Masud (also spelled Nosheen Masood) (15 April, 1978 – 6 December 2023) was a Pakistani actress, director, television producer, and psychotherapist. She worked in Pakistani television and directed music videos in the 1990s. She also appeared in drama serials including Ghareeb-e-Shehar, Jaal and Dolly Ki Ayegi Baraat.

== Early life and education ==
Masud was born and raised in Karachi, Pakistan. She pursued her higher education at St. Joseph's College for Women, earning a degree in Industrial Design. She later moved to work in television production and interior design.

== Career ==
=== Acting and hosting career ===
Masud's career began during the rise of Network Television Marketing (NTM), Pakistan's first private television channel. She started as an associate producer for a children's show before being discovered by Ghazanfar Ali, the head of Combine Productions.

She became known as a VJ for Pepsi Top of the Pops and hosted three seasons of the fashion show Andaz Apna Apna. She became known for her role in the soap opera Jaal and later appeared in TV shows including Colony 52, Ghar To Aakhir Apna Hai, and the 2010 comedy series Dolly Ki Ayegi Baraat, where she played the role of Saba. Additionally, she had a role as a student in the 1998 international biographical film Jinnah, starring Christopher Lee.

=== Direction and Music Industry ===
Masud worked as a director during the 1990s and early 2000s, directing music videos for artists such as Aamir Zaki, Shehzad Roy, Jawad Ahmad, Fringe Benefits, and the rock band Junoon.

She later held executive roles in Pakistani television. She was the founding head of programming at Indus Television Network from 2000 to 2002 and led Indus Music, which later became MTV Pakistan.

She served as general manager at Hum TV and as head of style 360 from 2010 to 2012. She also worked as channel head at Play TV and Health TV (HTV). At CNBC Pakistan, she worked as a senior producer and developed programming formats including Awam ki Awaz. She later served as creative director for television products such as Pakistan Idol and Sur ka Safar (2014-2015).

=== Later life and second career ===
In 2015, Masud transitioned into a second career as a counsellor and psychotherapist, maintaining a private practice in Karachi until shortly before her death. She also established Sync Interiors Pte. Ltd., through which she continued her work in interior and industrial design.

== Mentorship ==
Masud mentored television personalities during her tenure at MTV Pakistan, including Mahira Khan, Sanam Saeed, Syra Yousuf, and Ali Safina, all of whom began their careers as VJs on the channel.

== Personal life ==
Masud was previously married to Tariq Qureshi, with whom she had two sons. At the time of her death, she was married to her second husband, Imran.

== Illness and death ==
Nausheen Masud was diagnosed with bone cancer in 2017. She continued her professional work for six years while managing her condition. She died on 6 December 2023, in Karachi at the age of 45.

== Filmography ==
=== Television ===
Year	Title	Role	Network
1998	Ghareeb-e-Shehar	Batool	PTV
1998	Himmat-e-Batil	Sofia	PTV
1998	Jaal		NTM
2000	Na Jany Kaya Ho Gaya	Shaazi	PTV
2008	Colony 52		TV One
2010	Dolly Ki Ayegi Baraat	Saba	Geo Entertainment
2012	Ghar To Akhir Apna Hay	Nadia	PTV

=== Film ===
Year	Title	Role
1999	Jinnah	Student
