= Timmy G =

Pakistani TV show

- Also known as: Timmy G Reloaded
- Genre: Sitcom
- Written by: Vasay Chaudhry
- Directed by: Jawad Bashir
- Starring: Vasay Chaudhry; Ashraf Khan; Hina Javed; Haseeb Khan; Hina Sultan; Saba Qamar; Saeeda Imtiaz; Humaira Ali; Sana Askari; Sahir Lodhi; Jan Rambo
- Country of origin: Pakistan
- Original language: Urdu
- No. of seasons: 2
- No. of episodes: 113

Original release
- Network: ARY Digital
- Release: 11 January 2013

Timmy G Reloaded or Timmy G is a 2013 Pakistani sitcom directed by Jawad Bashir and written by Vasay Chaudhry that aired on ARY Digital. It stars Vasay Chaudhry, Ashraf Khan, Hina Javed, Haseeb Khan and Hina Sultan.

== Cast ==
- Vasay Chaudhry as Timmy G
- Ashraf Khan
- Hina Javed as Pinky
- Haseeb Khan
- Saba Qamar as Herself

=== Guests ===
- Saba Qamar as Herself
- Saeeda Imtiaz
- Humaira Ali as Nusrat
- Sana Askari
- Sahir Lodhi
- Jan Rambo
