= Azar Ki Ayegi Baraat =

2009 Pakistani comedy serial franchise

- The opening title screen for Azar Ki Ayegi Baraat DVD
- Genre: Comedy drama
- Written by: Syed Mohammad Ahmed
- Directed by: Marina Khan
- Creative director: Tahir Nadeem
- Starring: Bushra Ansari; Javed Sheikh; Sarwat Gilani; Saba Hameed; Samina Ahmad; Shehryar Zaidi; Hassan Niazi; Natasha Ali; Raheel Butt; Sana Askari; Uroosa Siddiqui
- No. of episodes: 8

Production
- Executive producer: Nadeem Baig
- Producer: EVERNEW
- Production locations: Karachi, Sindh, Pakistan
- Editor: Khurram A. Siddiqui
- Running time: Approximately 40 Minutes

Original release
- Network: Geo Entertainment
- Release: 30 November – 10 December 2009

Azar Ki Ayegi Baraat is a Pakistani comedy-drama from GEO TV. The show features Javed Sheikh, Saba Hameed, Bushra Ansari, Shehryar Zaidi, and Samina Ahmad. The show began to telecast in Pakistan in November 2009.

== Plot ==
Azar (Hassan Niazi) is an orphan who lives with his wealthy paternal uncle, Nazeer Chaudhary (Shehryar Zaidi) and his uncle's wife, Saima Chaudhary (Bushra Ansari) in Faisalabad. Saima is an obscure fashion designer and is humorously silly. Shoqat and Saima also have a son, Waqar Chaudhary and a daughter, Dolly. Waqar (better known by his nickname Vicky) is studying in London and is secretly married to a Sikh woman, Neetu, who is expecting. On the other hand, Dolly is a flirt and is interested in her cousin, Azar, even though Azar has refused to marry her. Azar is betrothed to Sila (Sarwat Gilani).

Sila lives in Karachi with her mother, Rabia (Saba Hameed) and her maternal grandmother, Mehr-un-Nisa (Samina Ahmad). Mehr-un-Nisa is the head of her family. Eight years have passed since the separation of Rabia and Sila's father, Faraz Ahmad (Javed Sheikh). They separated due to misunderstandings, and the sceptical and obstinate nature of Rabia. Rabia and Faraz also have another daughter, Ana who is married and detests her father.

It is revealed that Sila is secretly in touch with her father and calls him to attend her marriage against her mother's will. Rabia and Ana are upset to see Faraz at their home, however, Mehr-un-Nisa warmly welcomes him. On the other hand, Waqar arrives in Karachi along with Neetu to attend Azar's marriage. He tells his parents about his marriage when his mother forces him to propose to Laila, Sila's close friend. Faraz and Rabia’s relationship gets more tense, especially after the arrival of Faraz's ex. However, Ana develops a soft corner for her father. Sila gets despondent to realise that her mother's future is gloomy without her father and her parents will never reunite. Sila gets even more heartbroken when she watches a video in which Azar and Dolly are seated close to each other in a restaurant. She is reluctant to marry Azar, for she believes that her marriage will end up like that of her parents. However, Faraz and Rabia’s relationship rekindles just a day before their daughter's wedding and even more during the events of the wedding. Dolly becomes interested in Nabeel, Sila's friend, who was earlier interested in Sila. Finally, Sila happily marries Azar.

== Cast ==
- Javed Sheikh as Faraz Ahmad
- Bushra Ansari as Saima Chaudhary
- Samina Ahmad as Mehr-un-Nisa
- Saba Hameed as Rabia Ahmad
- Shehryar Zaidi as Nazeer Ahmed Chaudhary
- Sarwat Gilani as Sila Ahmad/Sila Azar Chaudhary
- Hassan Niazi as Azar Chaudhary
- Sana Askari as Laila Chaudhary
- Natasha Ali as Dolly Memon
- Uroosa Siddiqui as Sukaina Mela
- Sumbul Shahid as Mushtaq's mother
- Raheel Butt as Nabeel
- Mehreen Rafi as Ana

=== Guest appearance ===
- Marina Khan as Herself
- Arjumand Rahim as Soniya
- Faisal Qureshi as Himself
- Mahnoor Baloch as Herself
- Imran Abbas as Himself

== Broadcast ==
Due to the popularity of the series, the series was rerun on the network and later on sister channel, Geo Kahani. In India, the show was aired on Zindagi channel in 2015.
