= Jawed Sheikh =

Pakistani actor (born 1954)

- جاوید شیخ
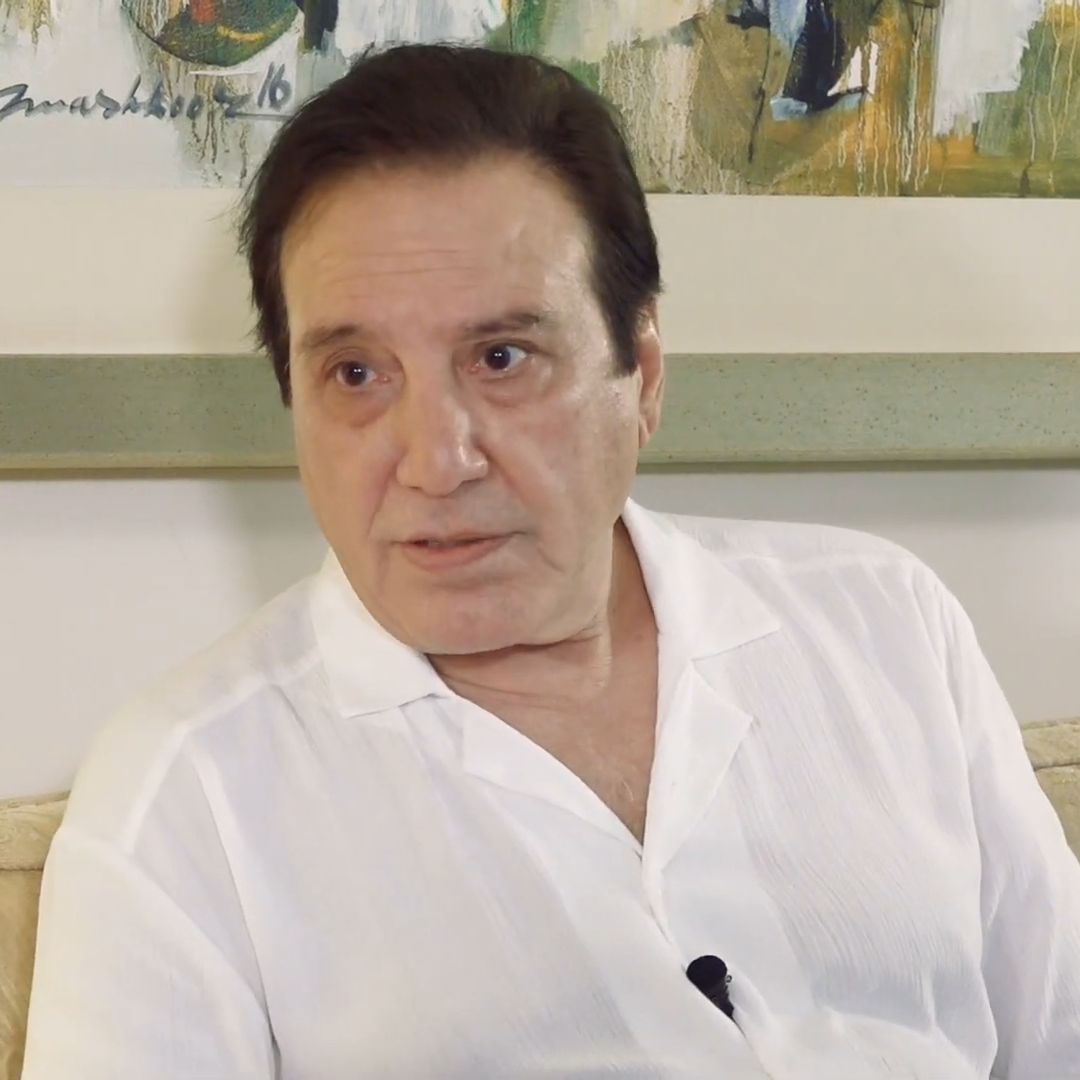
- Sheikh in 2023
- Born: Sheikh Jawed Iqbal; 8 October 1954 (age 72); Rawalpindi, Punjab, Pakistan
- Other names: Javed Sheikh; Javaid Sheikh
- Occupations: Actor; film director; film producer
- Years active: 1974–present
- Height: 1.80 m (5 ft 11 in)
- Spouses: Zinat Mangi; Salma Agha (m. 1981; div. 1987)
- Children: Shahzad Sheikh (son); Momal Sheikh (daughter)
- Parent: Shiekh Rehmatullah
- Relatives: Saleem Sheikh (younger brother); Behroze Sabzwari (brother-in-law); Shehroz Sabzwari (nephew)

Jawed Sheikh (also spelled Javaid and Javed; born 8 October 1954) is a Pakistani actor, film director and producer who works in Lollywood and Bollywood. He is best known for working in the Hindi films Om Shanti Om, My Name Is Anthony Gonsalves, Money Hai Toh Honey Hai, Namastey London, etc.

== Early life ==
Jawed Sheikh was born on 8 October 1954 in Rawalpindi, Punjab, Pakistan.

== Career ==
=== Pakistan ===
He made his acting debut in the Lollywood film Dhamaka, written by Pakistani writer Ibn-e-Safi released on 14 December 1974.

He acted in over 100 films in Urdu, Sinhala and Punjabi. In 2007, he appeared in Mein Ek Din Laut Kay Aaoon Ga.

He has also appeared in many television serials which have aired on PTV, Hum TV, Geo Entertainment and A-Plus.

Other notable Pakistani productions he appeared in are Na Maloom Afraad (2014), Bin Roye (2015), Wrong No. (2015), Jawani Phir Nahi Ani (2015), Mehrunisa V Lub U (2017), Na Maloom Afraad 2 (2017); Saat Din Mohabbat In (2018) His latest release is the hugely successful action comedy Teefa in Trouble (2018).

==== Director-producer-screenwriter ====
The first film he directed was Mushkil, released in 1995. In 2002, he directed Yeh Dil Aap Ka Huwa, in which he also played a supporting role. In 2008, he directed Khulay Aasman Ke Neechay, a big-budget film shot in four countries (Pakistan, India, United Arab Emirates and Australia). The production failed at the box-office, resulting in a net loss of Rs. 80 million. In 2018, Sheikh directed and acted in the film Wujood.

=== India ===
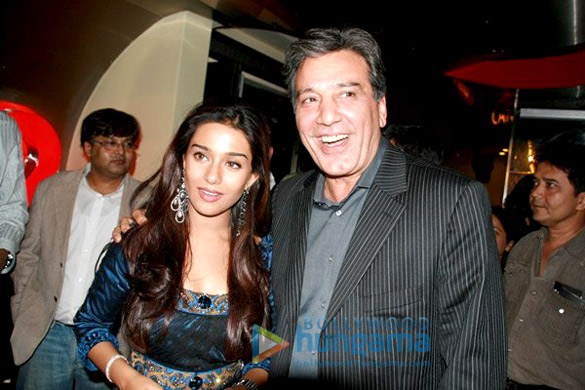
Sheikh with Amrita Rao at Premiere of My Name Is Anthony Gonsalves (2008)

In 2005, he switched to acting in Bollywood films and appeared in films like Shikhar (2005) and Jaan-E-Mann (2006). In 2007 he appeared in Namaste London, Om Shanti Om and played a supporting role in Jannat (2008). He has occasionally returned to Bollywood, appearing as Ranbir Kapoor's father in Tamasha (2015) and with his daughter Momal Sheikh in Happy Bhaag Jayegi (2016).

== Personal life ==
=== Family and relationships ===
Sheikh's first marriage was with Zinat Mangi, a television and film supporting actress of that era, with whom he has a daughter, Momal Sheikh and a son Shahzad Sheikh. His second marriage was to a British singer and actress, Salma Agha. Since his second divorce, he is still officially single but has been linked to several Lollywood film actresses. He is the brother of Saleem Sheikh and Safeena Sheikh, brother-in-law of Behroze Sabzwari and uncle of Shehroz Sabzwari. In news media interviews, he has a reputation of speaking frankly and candidly.

=== Association with Dawat-e-Islami ===
Sheikh has appeared in media content associated with the missionary Islamic organisation Dawat-e-Islami on multiple occasions. Around 2020, Dawat-e-Islami's official platforms, including its online media library, released videos featuring Sheikh sharing his tasurat (impressions), in which he spoke positively about the organisation's religious and social activities. In December 2025, Sheikh later visited Dawat-e-Islami's main centre, Faizan-e-Madinah in Karachi, where he toured various departments and expressed appreciation for the institution's work.

== Selected filmography ==
=== As a director and actor ===
Year	Films	Role(s)	Notes
1995	Mushkil		
1996	Chief Sahib		
1997	Yes Boss		
1998	Kahin Pyar Na Ho Jaye		
2002	Yeh Dil Aap Ka Huwa	Jamal	
2008	Khulay Aasman Ke Neechay		
2018	Wajood		

=== As a film actor ===
Key
†	Denotes film / serial, currently running in cinema / on-air
†	Denotes work that has not yet been released

Year	Film	Role	Notes
1974	Dhamaka	Zafar-ul-Mulk	Debut film
1983	Kabhi Alvida Na Kehna		
1984	Miss Colombo		
1985	Mehndi	Aslam	
1985	Faisla		
1985	Hong Kong Key Sholay	Javed Khan	
1985	Halchal		
1986	Zanjeer		
1986	Bhabi Dian Chooriaan	Afzal	
1989	Rangeelay Jasoos		
1989	Toofani Biljian		
1990	Sarmaya	Police Inspector	
1990	Ustadon Kay Ustad		
1991	Kalay Chor	as newsreporter	
1991	Husn da Chor		
1992	Daku Raaj	Deputy Superintendent Police	
1993	Zamana		
1996	Baazigar		
1997	Qarz		
2000	Mujhe Chand Chahiye	Tayyab razi	
2000	Ghar Kab Aao Gay	Charles Sobraj	
2002	Yeh Dil Aap Ka Huwa	Jamal	
2005	Dus	Dan's boss	Indian film
2005	Shikhar	Srinath Vardhan	Indian film
2006	Rafta Rafta – The Speed	Shilpa's father	Indian film
2006	Jaan-E-Mann	Piya's father	Indian film
2007	Apne	Roy	Indian film
2007	Namastey London	Pervez Khan	Indian film
2007	Om Shanti Om	Rajesh Kapoor	Indian film
2007	Mein Ek Din Laut Kay Aaoon Ga	Khan	
2008	My Name is Anthony Gonsalves	Inspector Khan	Indian film
2008	Jannat	Abu Ibrahim	Indian film
2008	Money Hai Toh Honey Hai	Prakash Arora	Indian film
2008	Yuvvraaj	Yogendra Yuvvraaj Singh	Indian film
2009	Road to Sangam	Supporting role	Indian film
2010	Hum Tum Aur Ghost	Gehna's Father	Indian film
2010	Kajraare	Tariq Anwar	Indian film
2011	Love Mein Ghum	Haroon	
2011	Bhai Log	jaam Bhai	
2013	Main Hoon Shahid Afridi	Asif Qureshi	
2014	Honour Killing	Supporting role	Indian film
2014	Sultanat	Sikander Khan	
2014	Na Maloom Afraad	Shakeel	
2015	Bin Roye	Saba and Saman's father	
2015	Wrong No.	Haji Abba	
2015	Karachi Se Lahore	Tiwana	
2015	Jawani Phir Nahi Ani	Mehboob Khan (Zoya's Father)	
2015	Halla Gulla	Golden Bhai (DON)	
2015	John	Hamza	
2015	Z.E.R.O	Mahaan Singh	Indian film
2015	Tamasha	Brijmohan Sahni	Indian film
2016	Sawal 700 Crore Dollar Ka	Tiger	
2016	Happy Bhag Jayegi	Javed Ahmed	Indian film
2016	Saya e Khuda e Zuljalal	Hamza	
2017	Balu Mahi		
2017	Shaan-e-Ishq	Ikram Khan	
2017	Mehrunisa V Lub U	Mian Bhai	
2017	Na Maloom Afraad 2	Shakeel	
2018	7 Din Mohabbat In	Dwarka Prasad	
2018	Wajood		
2018	Jackpot	Jojo	
2018	Teefa in Trouble	Bonzo aka Bashira	
2018	The Donkey King	Changu; Mangu's father	
2019	Wrong No. 2	Gul Nawaz	
2019	Superstar	Zulfiqar Khan	
2019	Sacch	Shahzaib	
2021	Khel Khel Mein	Sikandar Salman	
2022	Parde Mein Rehne Do	Latif Rana	
2022	Chakkar		
2022	Quaid e Azam Zindabad		
2023	Money Back Guarantee		
2024	Nayab	Shahid - Nayab's father	
2025	Qulfee	Mamoo	
2025	Deemak	Mehmood	
2025	Love Guru	Khan	
2025	Welcome To Punjab	Raees (Chief of ISI)	
2025	Hum Sub		
2026	Delhi Gate		
2026	Aag Lagay Basti Mein		
TBA	Driven	Danial Khan	Unreleased
TBA	Yaara Vey †	TBA	Filming
TBA	Chaa Jaa Re †	Jani Baloch (football coach)	Filming

=== As a television actor ===
Year	Title	Role	Network	Notes
1976	Parchaiyan	Nasir	PTV	
1978	Fifty Fifty		PTV	
1979	Ujlay Melay	Naveed-ur-Rehman	PTV	
1982	Ankahi	Faraz	PTV	
2000	Mausam	Ahmad Kamal	PTV	
2002	Chaandni Raatain	Aamir	PTV	
2006	Kuch Dil Ne Kaha	Ahsan	Geo Entertainment	
2009	Azar Ki Ayegi Baraat	Faraz Ahmad	Geo Entertainment	First installment of the Baraat Series
2009	Bol Meri Machli		Geo Entertainment	
2010	Ishq Gumshuda	Farooq Saad	Hum TV	
2010	Dolly ki Ayegi Baraat	Faraz Ahmad	Geo Entertainment	Second installment of the Baraat Series
2011	Takkay ki Ayegi Baraat	Faraz Ahmad	Geo Entertainment	Third installment of the Baraat Series
2011	Meri Behan Maya	Shahzeb Khan	Geo Entertainment	
2011	Kitni Girhain Baqi Hain		Hum TV	Season 1
2012	Annie Ki Ayegi Baraat	Faraz Ahmad	Geo Entertainment	Final Installment of the Baraat Series
2012	Zindagi Gulzar Hai	Junaid - Ghazala's husband, Zaroon and Sara's father	Hum TV	
2012	Na Kaho Tum Mere Nahi	Arsalan	Hum TV	
2012	Mata-e-Jaan Hai Tu	Uzair Farooq - Hajra's husband, Ibad's father	Hum TV	
2013	Khwab Tabeer		PTV Home	
2013	Kabhi Kabhi	Father of Eeshal and Eva	ARY Digital	
2013	Nanhi	Allaudino	Geo Entertainment	
2014	Rasam	Sattar - Father of Amber	Geo Entertainment	
2014	Dhol Bajnay Laga	Shahrukh	Hum TV	
2014	De Ijazat Jo Tu	Sarmad's Father	Hum TV	
2015	Tere Mere Beech		Hum TV	
2015	Guzaarish	Aalam	ARY Digital	
2015	Yeh Mera Deewanapan Hai	Jehangir - Nafeesuddin and Attiya's only son	A-Plus TV	
2016	Kitni Girhain Baqi Hain		Hum TV	Season 2
2016	Dil Ek Khilona Tha		Express Entertainment	
2017	Rasm E Duniya	Tabraiz	ARY Digital	
2017	Tishnagi Dil Ki	Ausaf	Geo Entertainment	
2018	Ru Baru Ishq Tha	Murad	Geo Entertainment	
2018	Kuch Is Tarah	Khalil	PTV	
2018	Beti	Hashmat, Azhar and Taimoor's father	ARY Digital	
2019	Rishtay Biktay Hain			
2020	Kasak		ARY Digital	
2020	Prem Gali		ARY Digital	
2021	Foreign Love Affair			
2021	Khuda Aur Mohabbat		Geo Entertainment	
2021	Shehnai		ARY Digital	
2021	Dobara	Ibtisam - Durdana's brother-in-law	Hum TV	
2021	Dil-e-Momin	Shehzad - Momin's father	Geo Entertainment	
2022	Angna	Azfar Baig	ARY Digital	
2022	Afrah Tafreeh	Jamshaid Bandookwala	Hum TV	Telefilm
2022	Pyar Deewangi Hai	Aslam - Mateen's father	ARY Digital	
2022	Habs	Salman Khan - Sadia's husband, Basit's father	ARY Digital	
2022	Taqdeer	Tahir	ARY Digital	
2022	Mujhe Pyaar Hua Tha	Rehan - Beenish's husband, Areeb's father	ARY Digital	
2023	Samjhota	Waqar - Munazzah & Nargis' husband	ARY Digital	
2023	Dhoka	Ali, Hira and Komal's father	ARY Digital	
2023	Jaisay Aapki Marzi	Hamdani	ARY Digital	
2023	College Gate	Wahaj’s Father	Green Entertainment	
2024	Pagal Khana	Taifoor	Green Entertainment	
2024	Chaal		Mun TV	
2024	Kabhi Main Kabhi Tum	Iftikhar Ahmed	ARY Digital	
2024	Iqtidar	Safdar Shah	Green Entertainment	
2025	Meri Tanhai	Khizer, Maleeha and Maryam's grandfather	Hum TV	
2025	Raja Rani	Zafar Hamdani	Hum TV	
2025	Inteha		ARY Digital	
2025	Mohalla	Junaid	Express Entertainment	
2025	Jama Taqseem	Rafeeq - Qais's father	Hum TV	
2025	Mafaad Parast	Adeel	Geo Entertainment	
2026	Jahannum Ba'raasta Jannat	Preetum Jaypal	Green Entertainment	
2026	Hurmat	Hurmat's uncle	Hum TV	

== Awards and nominations ==
Year	Award	Nominated work	Category	Result	Ref()
2007	Lux Style Awards	Kuch Dil Ne Kaha	Best TV Actor (Satellite)	Nominated	
2011	Lux Style Awards	Pal Bhar Mein	Best TV Actor (Terrestrial)	Won	
2015	Lux Style Awards	Na Maloom Afraad	Best Film Actor	Won	
2016	Lux Style Awards	Wrong No.	Best Supporting Actor (Film)	Won	
2018	Lux Style Awards	Na Maloom Afraad 2	Best Supporting Actor (Film)	Won	
2012	Pride of Performance Award	by the President of Pakistan	for his contributions to the Pakistani film industry	Won	
