= Annie Ki Ayegi Baraat =

2012 Pakistani comedy serial franchise

- Title screen
- Genre: Comedy drama
- Written by: Vasay Chaudhry
- Directed by: Marina Khan; Nadeem Beyg
- Creative director: Tahir Nadeem
- Starring: Bushra Ansari; Javed Sheikh; Saba Hameed; Huma Hameed; Shehzad Sheikh; Hina Dilpazeer; Naveen Waqar; Samina Ahmad; Shehryar Zaidi; Alishba Yousuf; Ahsan Khan; Natasha Ali; Raheel Butt; Sana Askari; Uroosa Siddiqui
- Opening theme: Mitra Ve Mitra
- Original languages: Urdu; Punjabi
- No. of episodes: 19

Production
- Executive producer: Aleena Ahmed
- Producer: Evernew Studios
- Production locations: Karachi, Sindh; Faisalabad, Punjab
- Editor: Khurram A. Siddiqui
- Running time: Approximately 40 Minutes

Original release
- Network: Geo Entertainment
- Release: 23 June 2012

Annie Ki Ayegi Baraat is a 2012 Pakistani drama serial of the Kis Ki Aayegi Baraat franchise on Geo Entertainment.

It is directed by Marina Khan and Nadeem Beyg and written by Vasay Chaudhry.

The title song "Mitra Ve Mitra" was sung by Shazia Manzoor and Raju.

== Synopsis ==
After marriage, Takka and Sukki plan their honeymoon trip while Rabia's sister Arfa arrives in Pakistan with her daughter Annie. In efforts to find a suitable groom for Annie, the whole family gathers together. Uninterested in marriage, Annie takes up a job on a film set where she meets Meekal. On the other hand, inside Chaudary's household, Saima is preparing for her boutique launch in Karachi, while Chaudary Sahab is concerned as her sister Farry along with her son Bobby D arrives from abroad.

In efforts to get her son married to Annie, Farry sends a marriage proposal while Annie is left to make a choice between Meekal and Bobby. As family waits for Annie's decision, differences between Azar and Sila arise due to corporate jealousy. Unable to wrap her head around Vicky's plan of moving abroad, Saima Chaudary decides to stop him however Sila's friend Laila is confused between her fiancé Adeel and Vicky.

As wedding preparations of two couples are underway, an unexpected love story starts which leaves the families divided. In this comedy of errors, will everyone find their happy endings?

== Cast ==
- Bushra Ansari as Saima Chaudhary/Fehmida
- Hina Dilpazeer as Farry Dharralla
- Samina Ahmed as Mehr Un Nisa
- Manzoor Qureshi as Khalid Bhanji
- Laila Zuberi as Mikaal's mother
- Javed Sheikh as Faraz
- Saba Hameed as Rabia Ahmed
- Huma Hameed as Arfa
- Naveen Waqar as Annie
- Shehzad Sheikh as Mikaal
- Uroosa Siddiqui as Sukaina
- Ahsan Khan as Azar
- Ali Safina as Mushtaq (Takkay)
- Alishba Yousuf as Sila Chaudhary
- Asad Siddiqui as Vikky Chaudhary
- Sana Askari as Laila
- Sumbul Shahid as Mushtaq's mother
- Uroosa Siddiqui as Sukaina (Sukhi)
- Natasha Ali as Dolly
- Raheel Butt as Nabeel
- Syed Mohammad Ahmed as Nabeel's father
- Yasir Ali Khan as Adeel
- Vasay Chaudhary as Bobby D (Darrallah)
- Shehryar Zaidi as Chaudhary Nazeer Sahab
- Gohar Rasheed as Sila's boss and classmate in University
- Muhammad Aslam as Shahab (Servant)
