= Samina Ahmad =

Pakistani actress, producer, director (born 1950)

- ثمینہ احمد
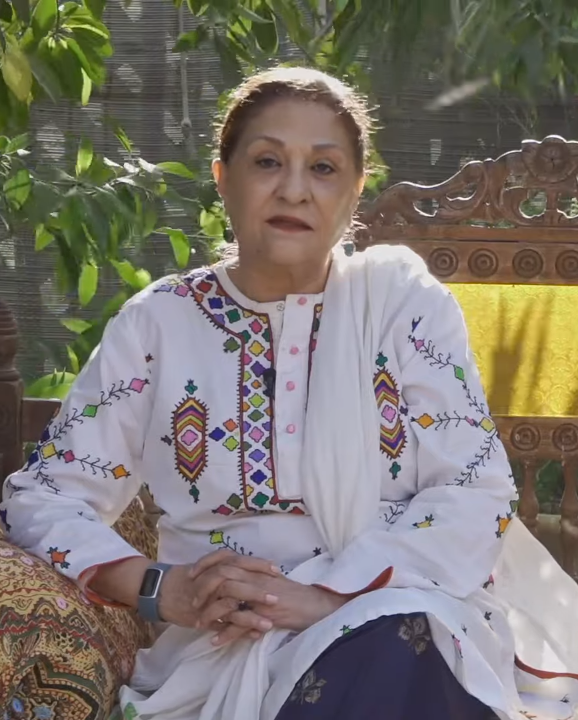
- Born: 20 March 1950 (age 76); Lahore, Punjab, Pakistan
- Occupations: Actress; producer; director
- Years active: 1965–present
- Spouses: Fareed Ahmad (div. 1993); Manzar Sehbai (m. 2020)
- Children: 2
- Awards: Pride of Performance Award by the President of Pakistan (2011)

Samina Ahmad (born 20 March 1950) is a Pakistani film and television actress, stage performer, producer, and director. She is one of the most popular actresses of her time and was one of the most successful actresses of the 1970s, 1980s, and 1990s. A veteran television actress who has worked for over six decades in the Urdu entertainment industry, she was honoured with the Pride of Performance by the Government of Pakistan in 2011.

Started her on-screen career in mid 1960s, Ahmad performed for many of PTV's most successful series, including Waris (1979), Aahat (1991), and Family Front (1997) for which she won PTV Award for Best Actress also. One of her most recent roles includes Geo TV's widely-popular four-part comedy series Kis Ki Aayegi Baraat (2009–2012) and Hum TV's acclaimed comedy drama series Suno Chanda (2018) and its sequel Suno Chanda 2 (2019). Ahmad further appeared in Marvel Cinematic Universe's Ms. Marvel (2022), marking her international debut.

She married for the second time with actor Manzar Sehbai in April 2020.

== Early life ==
Ahmad was born in Lahore, Punjab, Pakistan, on 20 March 1950. Her father was the Director of Forests in the West of Pakistan, and her mother was a housewife. Her father died in 1965, and her mother in 2018. She is the eldest of her five siblings. She has a Masters in Home Economics.

== Career ==
Ahmad started her career with serious plays on Pakistan Television Corporation; and soon rose to prominence with her comedy plays like Akkar Bakkar, Taal Matol, Alif Noon, and Such Gup. In 1997, she had a major breakthrough in the popular sitcom Family Front. She had also worked at Alhamra Arts Council, Lahore, as a Programme director for two decades. Despite her busy professional career, Samina Ahmed has also been an active member of the Women's Action Forum in Pakistan.

In 2001, she directed the sitcom Hoo Bahoo, written by Farooq Qaiser. The sitcom revolves the family politics among a couple and the wife's mother-in-law, played by Ahmad.

Ahmad was a programme director at Alhamra Arts Council in Lahore while also performing on television. In 1997, she launched her own television company, Samina Ahmad Productions, which produced the widely-popular TV drama Family Front.

== Personal life ==
Ahmad was married to Pakistani filmmaker Fariduddin Ahmed, the son of veteran filmmaker W. Z. Ahmed. The couple has a son, and a daughter together. Fariduddin divorced her, a few years before his death in 1993. Ahmad married actor, Manzar Sehbai on 4 April 2020, in a private Nikah ceremony in Lahore.

== Filmography ==
=== Film ===
Year	Title	Role	Notes	Ref.
1984	Naraaz	Rahat		
2014	Dukhtar	Rukhsana		
2018	Load Wedding	Raja's Mother		
2021	Khel Khel Mein	Zaib		
2022	Intezaar	Salma Kanwal		

=== Television ===
Year	Title	Role	Network	Notes
1970	Akkar Bakkar	Samina	PTV	
1972	Such Gup	News reporter	PTV	
1973	Sangat	Herself	PTV	
1973	Ya Naseeeb Clinic	Anarkali	PTV	
1974	Taal Matol	Lady	PTV	
1979	Waris	Sughra Niaz Ali	PTV	
1980	Side Order	Tahira	PTV	
1982	Alif Noon	Andaleeb	PTV	
1984	Andhera Ujala	Anjum	PTV	
1984	Ik Hasrat-e-Tameer	Khalida	PTV	
1984	20 Golden Years Of PTV	Herself	PTV	
1984	Sanwal Mor Moharan	Mani's mother	PTV	
1985	Saahil	Jamila	PTV	
1987	Raat	Kanwal	PTV	
1989	Kiran	Simi	PTV	
1990	Dareechay	Naila	PTV	
1990	Birdary Hotel	Jannat Bibi	PTV	
1991	Aahat	Bushra	PTV	
1994	Ababeel	Rani's aunt	PTV	
1994	Angaar Waadi	Dr. Hajra's mother	PTV	
1995	Ammi	Ammi	PTV	
1995	Nashaib	Maa	PTV	
1997	Ghar Se Ghar	Ishrat	PTV	
1997	Family Front	Nusrat	PTV	
1998	Janey Anjaney	Maria	PTV	
1998	Cat Walk	Gulzar Fatima	PTV	
1998	Dhoop Mein Sawan	Maryam	PTV	
2001	Hoo Bahoo	Salma	Indus TV	
2005	Inspector Khojee	Samina Ahmed	PTV	
2009	Tanveer Fatima (B.A)	Bano	Geo Entertainment	
2009	Azar Ki Ayegi Baraat	Mehr-un-Nisa	Geo Entertainment	
2009	Bol Meri Machli	Qudsia	Geo Entertainment	
2010	Noor Bano	Bi Jaan	Hum TV	
2010	Dolly ki Ayegi Baraat	Mehr un Nisa	Geo Entertainment	
2010	Dastaan	Orphanage caretaker	Hum TV	Cameo
2010	Talluq	Jameel's mother	Geo Entertainment	
2010	Chand Parosa		Geo Entertainment	
2010	Husn Ara Kaun	Zeenat	TV One	
2011	Kitni Girhain Baqi Hain		Hum TV	Episodic role
2011	Takkay Ki Ayegi Baraat	Mehr Un Nisa	Geo Entertainment	
2011	Akhri Barish	Husna	Hum TV	
2011	Pani Jaisa Piyar	Nuzhat	Hum TV	
2012	Annie Ki Ayegi Baraat	Mehr Un Nisa	Geo Entertainment	
2012-2013	Mirat-ul-Uroos	Asghari	Geo Entertainment	
2013	Dil Muhallay Ki Haveli	Amma Bi	Geo Entertainment	
2015	Sawaab	Fehmida	Hum Sitaray	
2015	Maikey Ko Dedo Sandes		Geo Entertainment	
2015	Sangat	Adnan and Farah's mother	Hum TV	
2015	Bojh		Geo Entertainment	
2015-2016	Gul-e-Rana	Jazba Aapi	Hum TV	
2016	Iss Khamoshi Ka Matlab		Geo Entertainment	
2016	Kitni Girhain Baaki Hain (Season 2)	Banto's mother-in-law	Hum TV	Anthology series; Episode 10
2016	Naimat	Babar's mother	ARY Digital	
2016-2017	Dil Banjaara	Zubaida Mukhtar	Hum TV	
2017	Sun Yaara	Amna	ARY Digital	
2017	Pinjra	Jannat Bibi	A-Plus Entertainment	
2017	Ghairat	Saba's mother	ARY Digital	
2017	Yaar-e-Bewafa	Humaira	Geo Entertainment	
2017	Baday Mian		TV One	Telefilm
2017	Super Saas		TV One	Telefilm
2017	Aangan	Zaitoon Bano	ARY Digital	
2018	Ustani Jee	Zubaida	Hum TV	Anthology series; Episode 3
2018	Suno Chanda	Mumtaaz Begum "Bi jaan"	Hum TV	
2018	Kabhi Band Kabhi Baja		Express Entertainment	Anthology series, Episodes 4 & 10
2018	Khatti Methi Love Story	Nadia's grandmother	Express Entertainment	
2018	Siskiyaan	Shamshad	BOL Entertainment	
2018	Dilara	Zehra	BOL Entertainment	
2019	Dil-e-Bereham		A-Plus TV	
2019	Do Bol	Firdous	ARY Digital	
2019	Suno Chanda 2	Mumtaaz Begum "Bi jaan"	Hum TV	
2020	Kashf	Kashf's grandmother	Hum TV	
2020	Bikhray Moti	Shamsa; Zulfi's mother	ARY Digital	
2020	Bandhay Aik Dor Say	Umer and Maheen's grandmother	Geo TV	
2020	Ghisi Piti Mohabbat	Kaneez Fatima	ARY Digital	
2021	Safar Tamam Howa	Qudsia Begum	Hum TV	
2021	Shehnai	Bakht's grandmother	ARY Digital	
2021	Baddua	Mudassir's mother	ARY Digital	
2021	Badnaseeb	Saeed's mother	Hum TV	
2021	Mere Humsafar	Riffat Ahmed	ARY Digital	
2022	Afrah Tafreeh	Khushi's grandmother	Hum TV	Telefilm
2022	Love Life Ka Law	Baby Aunty	Geo Entertainment	Telefilm
2022	Chand Si Dulhan	Parizeh's grandmother	ARY Digital	Telefilm
2022-2023	Kala Doriya	Tabassum Jahan	Hum TV	
2023-2024	Baby Baji	Rashida Begum "Baby Baji"	ARY Digital	
2024	Kitni Girhain Baaki Hain	Aasia's mother	Hum TV	
2024	Mohabbat Satrangi	Zubaida	Green Entertainment	
2024	Wo 7 Din	Roshan Ara	Hum TV	
2024	Tark-e-Wafa	Kanwal's mother	ARY Digital	
2024	Baby Baji Ki Bahuwain	Rashida Begum "Baby Baji"	ARY Digital	
2025	Bajjo	Samina	Geo Entertainment	
2025	Aas Paas	Aneeqa Begum	Geo Entertainment	
2025	Qubool Hai	Sakina's mother	Express Entertainment	
2025	Neeli Kothi	Almas	Hum TV	
2026	Rang De	Noor Bahar	Geo TV	
2026	Zabt	Bi Jaan	Geo Entertainment	

=== Telefilm ===
Year	Title	Role	Notes
2025	Saiyyan Thanedaar	Ramil's grandmother	
2026	Bhaag Sunny Bhaag	Tina	

=== Web series ===
Year	Title	Role	Platform	Notes
2021	Dhoop Ki Deewar	Sarah's grandmother	ZEE5	
2022	Ms. Marvel	Sana, Kamala's grandmother	Disney+	

== Awards and recognition ==
Year	Title	Award	Category	Result
1985	Naraaz	Nigar Award	Best Supporting Actress	Won
1999	Herself	PTV Awards	Best Director Award by PTV.	Won
2000	Family Front	PTV Award	Best Actress	Won
2002	Lux Style Awards Committee	Lux Style Awards	Best TV Actress	Nominated
2005	Herself	The 1st Indus Drama Awards	Best Actress Sitcom in a Leading Role	Won
2011	Herself	Pride of Performance Award	Pride of Performance Award by the President of Pakistan	Won
