= Tariq Amin =

Pakistani hairdresser

Tariq Amin is a Pakistani hairdresser, celebrity wardrobe stylist, hair stylist and media personality. He has salons in Islamabad, Lahore and Karachi.

Amin graduated with a business degree from the College of Boca Raton, Florida in 1983. His work has also been shown in Vogue. He has done the makeup for music videos by Ali Azmat and Abbas Ali Khan among others, as well as appeared in the video for "Channo" by Ali Zafar. Amin has also featured in Adil Omar's "Paki Rambo" music video.

In 2011, Amin was in charge of heading Islamabad's first fashion week and launched 'T With T, his own reality show.
