= Uroosa Siddiqui =

Pakistani television actress and comedian

- Born: Quetta, Pakistan
- Occupation: Actress
- Years active: 2009–present
- Spouse: Saqib Khan (m. 2015)
- Children: 1

Uroosa Siddiqui is a Pakistani television actress and comedian. She is best known for her role as Sukhi in Baraat series and got her first leading role in 3rd season of Baraat series Takkay Ki Ayegi Baraat. Her other notable works include Shagufta Jahan in Quddusi Sahab Ki Bewah, Sana in Dramay Baziyan, and Zohra Jabeen in Hum Sab Ajeeb Se Hain and Warda Ahmed in Fun Khana for which she won Hum Award for Best Actor in Comic Role. Later, she played the role of Bemisaal in Dolly Darling, which aired on Geo Entertainment.

== Personal life ==
Siddiqui married Saqib Khan in December 2015.

== Television ==
| Year | Title | Role | Notes |
|---|---|---|---|
| 2009 | Azar Ki Ayegi Baraat | Sukaina Mela | |
| 2010 | Nadaaniyaan | Herself | Episode 50 |
| 2010 | Dolly Ki Ayegi Baraat | Sukaina/Sukhi | |
| 2011 | Takkay Ki Ayegi Baraat | Sukaina/Sukhi | |
| 2011 | Bulbulay | Dr. Uroosa | Episode 115 |
| 2012 | Annie Ki Ayegi Baraat | Sukhi | |
| 2012-2014 | Quddusi Sahab Ki Bewa | Shagufta Jahan | |
| 2012 | Fun Khana | Warda Ahmed | Hum Award for Best Comic Actor |
| 2012 | Jahez | | |
| 2013 | Nanhi | | |
| 2013 | Kankar | Rukhsar (Adnan's sister) | |
| 2013 | Ghundi | Neelofar Chaudhry | |
| 2014 | Dramay Baziyan | Sana | |
| 2016 | Kitni Girhain Baaki Hain (season 2) | Nargis | Episode 3 |
| 2016 | Aashiq Colony | Tabassum | Telefilm |
| 2016-2018 | Hum Sab Ajeeb Se Hain | Zohra Jabeen | |
| 2018 | Kabhi Band Kabhi Baja | | Episode 7 |
| 2019 | Dolly Darling | Bemisaal | |
| 2019 | Barfi Laddu | Titli | |
| 2020 | Makafaat (season 2) | | Episode 19 "Bojh" |
| 2022 | Made For China | Rehmat | Telefilm |
| 2023 | Kuch Ankahi | Shagufta | |
