= Ali Safina =

Pakistani actor (born 1983)

- Born: Muhammad Ali Safina; 18 December 1983 (age 42); Multan, Punjab, Pakistan
- Occupations: Actor, VJ, Host, RJ
- Years active: 2010–present
- Known for: Takkay Ki Ayegi Baraat; Suno Chanda
- Height: 1.93 m (6 ft 4 in)
- Spouse: Hira Tareen (m. 2013)
- Children: 1
- Relatives: Zara Tareen (sister-in-law)

Ali Safina (born 18 December 1983) is a Pakistani actor, comedian and host. He has starred in sitcoms such as Takkay Ki Ayegi Baraat and in 2015 made his film debut with Jalaibee.

== Personal life ==
Ali Safina was born in Multan, Pakistan. He later moved to Oman with his parents where he completed his schooling at Pakistan School Muscat; for higher education he started off in The Caledonian College of Engineering in Oman and went on to Scotland where he got a degree in mechanical engineering. Since 2013, he has been married to Pakistani model Hira Tareen, with whom he has one child.

== Career ==
Safina started his career as a DJ, VJ and had roles in drama serials like Daag e Nadamat. After his performance as Takkay in the comedy-drama Dolly Ki Ayegi Baraat, producer Sajjad Gul told him that his next installment, Takkay Ki Ayegi Baraat, would focus on him, as he believed Safina was his lucky charm. He followed it up with funny talk shows as a host (Hunn Dass). Safina made his film debut in 2014 in a caper-crime film Jalaibee in which he played the main role as Bugga opposite Danish Taimoor and Wiqar Ali Khan.

== Filmography ==
=== Films ===
Year	Title	Role	Notes	Ref
2015	Jalaibee	Bugga		
2016	Oye Kuch Kar Guzar	Shamsher	Released on YouTube	
2023	Money Back Guarantee			
2023	Teri Meri Kahaniyaan	Host	Segment: "Pasoori"	

=== Television series ===
Year	Title	Role	Network	Notes
2010	FireStation	VJ	AAG TV	
2010	Dolly Ki Ayegi Baraat	Takkay	Geo TV	
2011	Pakistan Sangeet Icon	Host	MTV Pakistan	
2011	Kaneez		ARY Digital	
2011	Takkay Ki Ayegi Baraat	Takkay	Geo TV	
2011	Daag e Nadamat	Zubair	PTV	
2012	Annie Ki Ayegi Baraat	Takkay	Geo TV	
2014	Aik Pal	Imran	Hum TV	
2016	Ab Kar Meri Rafugari	Shakeel	ARY Digital	
2017	Zoya Sawleha		Geo TV	
2017	Aadat	Farhan	TVOne	
2018	Tabeer	Ajju	Hum TV	
2018	Suno Chanda	Jawad / Joji	Hum TV	Ramadan Special
2018	Khafa Khafa Zindagi	Bilal	A Plus	
2018	Romeo Weds Heer	Jaidi	Geo TV	
2019	Suno Chanda 2	Jawad / Joji	Hum TV	Ramadan Special
2019	Barfi Laddu	Laddu	ARY Digital	
2019	Pepsi Battle of The Bands (season 4)	Host	Various	
2019	Aey Zindagi	Ali	YouTube	
2020	Qarar	Salman	Hum TV	
2021	Chupke Chupke	Miskeen	Hum TV	Ramadan Special
2021	Sila-e-Mohabbat	Raheel	Hum TV	
2022	Aitebaar	Babar	Hum TV	
2022	Paristan	Kamali	Hum TV	Ramadan Special
2023	Fairy Tale	Asadullah Khan	Hum Tv	Ramadan Special
2023	Jaisay Aapki Marzi	Meerab	ARY Digital	
2023	Mannat Murad	Faisal	Geo Entertainment	
2023	Kuch Ankahi	Saif ur Rahman	ARY Digital	
2023	Breaking News	Naveed Khan	Green Entertainment	
2024	Very Filmy	Chugtai/Mama Chi	Hum TV	
2025	Goonj		Hum TV	

=== Telefilms ===
Year	Title	Role	Network	Notes
	Hoshiyar			
2016	2nd Love Marriage	Junaid	ARY Digital	
2016	Achi Phuppo		Express	Eid Special
2017	Salma Ka Balma	Ayan	ARY Digital	Eid Special
2023	I Love You Zara	Zaryab	ARY Digital	Eid Special

== Awards and nominations ==
Year	Ceremony	Category	Project	Result
2012	11th Lux Style Awards	Best TV Actor (Satellite)	Takkay Ki Ayegi Baraat	Nominated
2016	15th Lux Style Awards	Best Supporting Actor in a Film	Jalaibee	Nominated
