= Alishba Yousuf =

Pakistani actress, model and presenter

- Born: 16 September 1985 (age 40); Karachi, Sindh, Pakistan
- Occupations: Actress, VJ, model
- Years active: 2010–present
- Spouse: Rayyan Durrani (m. 2009)
- Relatives: Syra Yousuf (sister), Palwasha Yousuf (sister), Ruqaiya Yousuf (sister)

Alishba Yousuf (born 16 September 1985) is a Pakistani VJ, model and actress who works in Pakistani television series and telefilms. She has appeared in supporting roles in several television series, including Main Abdul Qadir Hoon (2010), Takkay ki Ayegi Baraat (2011), Meray Dard Ko Jo Zuban Miley (2012), Annie ki Ayegi Baraat (2012), Sargoshi (2016) and Tanhaiyan Naye Silsilay (2012).

== Personal life ==
Alishba was born on 16 September 1985 in a Muslim family in Karachi, Pakistan. She is the sister of VJ Palwasha Yousuf and actress Syra Yousuf.

On 12 February 2009, she married Rayyan Durrani (who appeared in MasterChef Pakistan) in Karachi. The couple welcomed a daughter, Iliyana, in 2020.

== Career ==
Yousuf started her career as a VJ at TV channel AAG. Since then, she has appeared in many TV commercials of leading Pakistani brands like Mobilink, Fair & Lovely, and Peki. Yousuf made her acting debut in the serial Chand Pe Dastak on Hum TV. Then she appeared in Main Abdul Qadir Hoon, another Hum TV drama serial, Ek Nazar Meri Taraf on Geo TV, Takkay ki Ayegi Baraat, Meray Charagar, Meray Dard Ko Jo Zuban Miley on Hum TV and Annie ki Ayegi Baraat. She also appeared in the ARY Digital reality show Desi Kuriyan with her sister Palwasha. She then appeared in Tanhaiyan Naye Silsilay on ARY Digital with her sister Syra Yousuf.

=== Television ===
Year	Serial	Character	Channel	Notes
2010	Chand Pe Dastak	Aahoo	Hum TV	
2010-2011	Main Abdul Qadir Hoon	Zareen	Hum TV	
2011	Ek Nazar Meri Taraf	Siffat	Geo TV	
2011	Desi Kuriyan	Contestant	ARY Digital	Reality show
2011	Takkay ki Ayegi Baraat	Sila	Geo TV	
2011	Meray Charagar	Zoya	Geo TV	
2011	Rok Lo Aaj Ki Raat Ko	Aayla	Express Entertainment	
2011	Mangni Arranged	Aaima	Hum TV	Telefilm
2011	Pappu Ki Paroson	Sohai	Hum TV	Telefilm
2012	Meray Dard Ko Jo Zuban Miley	Arifa	Hum TV	
2012	Annie ki Ayegi Baraat	Sila	Geo TV	
2012	Tanhaiyan Naye Silsilay	Zeenya	Ary Digital	
2013	Sargoshi	Amal	Urdu 1	
2015	Nain Gaye Haar	Laila	ATV	
2016	Bay Aib	Tooba	Urdu1	
2016	Mere Humnawa	Zaib	Ary digital	

== See also ==
- List of Pakistani actresses
