= Asad Siddiqui =

Pakistani actor

- اسد صدیقی
- Born: 15 April 1987 (age 39); Karachi, Sindh, Pakistan
- Occupation: Actor
- Years active: 2009–present
- Spouse: Zara Noor Abbas (m. 2017)
- Children: 1
- Relatives: Adnan Siddiqui (uncle); Asma Abbas (mother-in-law)

Asad Siddiqui (Urdu: اسد صدیقی) is a Pakistani actor, who started his acting career while studying for his MBA. The nephew of actor Adnan Siddiqui, he appeared in notable television projects including Gumrah, Khuda Dekh Raha Hai, Shikwa, Dareecha, Azar Ki Ayegi Baraat, Joru Ka Ghulam, Sanam, and Tawaan. He is best known for his role as an antagonist in Surkh Chandni which is about acid attack victims. He made his film debut with Wajahat Rauf's Chhalawa with his spouse Zara Noor Abbas.

== Personal life ==
Siddiqui is the nephew of actor Adnan Siddiqui.

In 2017, he married fellow actress Zara Noor Abbas, daughter of actress Asma Abbas and niece of actresses Bushra Ansari and Sumbul Shahid. According to Abbas, they first met on the sets of Kis Ki Ayegi Baraat. The Nikah ceremony was held in Karachi, Pakistan. This was the second marriage for both Asad and Zara. They have one daughter.

== Filmography ==
Key
†	Denotes film / drama that has not released yet

=== Television ===
Year	Title	Role	Notes
2009	Azar Ki Ayegi Baraat	Vicky	Directed by Marina Khan, and aired on Geo TV
2010	Dolly Ki Ayegi Baraat	Vicky	Directed by Marina Khan and Nadeem Baig, and aired on Geo TV
2011	Takkay Ki Ayegi Baraat	Vicky	Directed by Marina Khan, and aired on Geo TV
2011	Dareecha	Faizan	Aired on ARY Digital
2012	Annie Ki Ayegi Baraat	Vicky	Directed by Marina Khan and Nadeem Baig, and aired on Geo TV
2013	Meri Maa	Shan	Aired on Geo TV
2014	Khata		Aired on ARY Digital
2014	Shikwa	nadeem	Directed by Rubina Ashraf, And aired on ARY Digital
2014	Rukhsati		Written by Amna Mufti, Directed by Mohsin Mirza
2014	Chhoti	Umair	
2015	Anaya Tumhari Hui		
2015	Khuda Dekh Raha Hai	Moiz	
2015	Sartaj Mera Tu Raaj Mera	Shehroze	
2015	Gila Kis Se Karein		
2015	Goya		
2015	Madawa		
2015	Mery apny		
2015	Mujhe Qabul Hai		
2015	Rishton Ki Dor		
2015	Total Siyapa		
2016	Sanam	Farhan	
2016	Ghayal	Moiz	
2016	Socha Na Tha	Murtaza	
2016	Joru Ka Ghulam		
2016	Gila	Shajee	
2016	Heer	Ibrahim	
2016	Iss Khamoshi Ka Matlab	Noman	
2017	Zindaan	Adil	
2017	Hari Hari Churiyaan	Kashan	
2017	Paimanay	amir	
2017	Shadi Mubarak Ho	Ikhtiyar	
2017	Zard Zamano Ka Sawera	ali	
2017	Manto	Masood	
2017	Mumkin		
2017	Gumrah	Jamshed	
2018	Mah-e-Tamaam	Rohel	
2018	Sodai	haris	
2018	Ro Raha Hai Dil	humayon	
2018	Tawaan	Zaman	
2018-2019	Balaa	Junaid	
2019	Enaaya	Rasik	
2019	Surkh Chandni	Jawad	
2019	Rishtay Biktay Hain	Hammad	
2019-2020	Tu Mera Junoon	Taimoor	
2019-2020	Tera Yahan Koi Nahin	waqas	
2020	Dil Ruba	Ayaaz	
2020	Zebaish	Nadeem	
2020	Meray Dost Meray Yaar Season 2	Sherry	Mini series
2021	Amanat	Fawad	cameo
2021	Sinf-e-Aahan	Norez	
2021	Aye Musht-E-Khaak	Dayyan	
2022	Paristan	Aazir	
2022	Love Life Ka Law	Asad	Telefilm
2023	Behroop	Taimoor	
2023	Tumhare Husn Ke Naam	Atif	
2023	Siyaah	Wasi Khan	Episode "Roohdad"
2024	Habil Aur Qabil	Qadir Qazalbaksh	

=== Film ===
Year	Title	Role	Director	Notes
2016	Lahore Se Aagey	Pan Seller	Wajahat Rauf	Cameo appearance
2019	Chhalawa	Luqman	Wajahat Rauf	

=== Music video ===
Year	Title	Artist	Notes
2020	"Ye Watan Tumhara Hai"	Various	
