= Zebaish =

Pakistani television series

- Genre: Comedy; Drama; Dark Thriller
- Written by: Bushra Ansari
- Directed by: Iqbal Hussain
- Starring: Zara Noor Abbas; Asad Siddiqui; Bushra Ansari; Asma Abbas; Zoya Nasir
- Country of origin: Pakistan
- Original language: Urdu
- No. of episodes: 28

Production
- Producer: Momina Duraid
- Camera setup: Multi-camera setup
- Running time: 40-42 Minutes
- Production company: MD Productions

Original release
- Network: Hum TV
- Release: 12 June – 18 December 2020

Zebaish (Urdu: زیبائش, lit. 'Adorning') is a 2020 Pakistani television series premiered on 12 June 2020 on Hum TV. It is written by Bushra Ansari, directed by Iqbal Hussain and produced by Momina Duraid under their banner MD Production. Based on the life of actors in the film industry, it features Zara Noor Abbas, Asad Siddiqui, Zoya Nasir, Bushra Ansari, Asma Abbas and Babar Ali.

== Plot ==
The show highlights certain issues of Pakistani society, including the backwardness of certain areas of Pakistan where people like Pirzada Wasif; being a "Pir", or so-called spiritual leader, think that they can run the society according to their whims and can dominate other people on this basis. The other issue is regarding the film industry of Pakistan where certain women like Pirzadi Noushaba deviate from "the right path" and, for the sake of getting fame, sacrifice their loved ones and their morals.

== Cast ==
- Zara Noor Abbas as Noushaba “Noushi”—Daughter of Nadira & Pirzada Nafees-ud-din
- Asad Siddiqui as Nadeem
- Bushra Ansari as Shahana—Nadeem's mother
- Asma Abbas as Nadira—a courtesan, Pirzada Nafees-ud-din's wife & Noushaba's mother
- Zoya Nasir as Natasha “Tashi”—Munshi's daughter
- Babar Ali as Pervaiz—Javed's best friend
- Qavi Khan as Pir Sahab—Pirzadi Salma's father, Wasif & Nafeesudin's chacha, Noushaba's grandfather
- Adnan Shah Tipu as Pirzada Qasim—a husband of two wives and wants to marry Noushaba
- Alyy Khan
- Shabbir Jan as Javed—an alcoholic racer, lawyer and gambler, Shahana's first husband, Nadeem's father & Pervaiz's best friend
- Iqbal Hussain as Wasif—Pirzada Nafees-ud-din's brother & Pirzadi Salma's husband
- Shaheen Khan as Natasha's mother and a widow
- Salma Zafar as Sania
- Akbar Islam
- Hammad Shoaib as Dilawer
- Sadaf Nasir as Salma—Wife of Wasif
- Sajid Shah as Nafees ud-din
- Fatima Zahra Malik as Nazo

== Production ==
After working with Zara Noor Abbas, Asma Abbas, and Bushra Ansari in the historical drama Deewar-e-Shab, Iqbal Hussain decided to cast the same trio in an upcoming project. In October 2019, the serial was announced by Abbas through her Instagram account. It marked the second on-screen collaboration of real life couple Abbas and Siddiqui after Challawaa. The first and second teasers were released on 8 May 2020 saying that they would be released after Eid in June 2020.

== Controversy ==
The critic Lubna Faryad from YouTube channel, "Amma TV Aur Mein" criticized the show, to which Bushra Ansari wrote, "This is cheap commentary, they (critics) are the coronas in our lives". The social media trolls Ansari and her comments. Later, Ansari apologised to drama critics, said she overreacted.

== Reception ==
=== Critical reception ===
A reviewer from The News International criticised the writing to inaccurately portray the legal process of polygamy.
