= Naheed Shabbir =

Pakistani television actress and model

- Born: Naheed Shabbir; 1 November 1973 (age 52); Karachi, Sindh
- Occupations: Actress, Model
- Years active: 1997 – present

Naheed Shabbir (or Naheed Shabeer) (Urdu: ناہید شبیر) is a Pakistani television actress and model. Shabbir has appeared in dramas for PTV television, Geo TV, and Hum TV. The programs include Bint-e-Adam, Be Zuban, Bichrein ge ab kaisay, Yadain, and Khawab toot jaty hain.

== Career ==
Naheed Shabbir started her career in 1997 with PTV Home Drama. Naheed did many dramas, like Khawab toot jaty hain on Geo TV in 2008, Yadain & Bichrein ge ab kaisay in 2007, and Bint-e-Adam & Be Zuban on PTV Home in 2003. Aankh Salamat Andhey Log on ATV, Aik Bechara on ARY Digital in 2009, Akeli as Shahnaz on Hum TV in 2015, Gardish on ARY Digital in 2009, Ghar on PTV Home in 2012, Ishq on Hum TV in 2009, Jeena Isi Ka Naam Hai on TV One Global in 2009, Kaanch Kay Rishtay on PTV Home in 2015, Khushi Ek Roag as Shahida on ARY Digital in 2012, Koi Lamha Gulab Ho as Faiqa on Hum TV in 2006, Main Na Manu Haar as Sarwat on Hum TV in 2014, Naseeb on Indus TV in 2009, Pakistan Quarters on ATV) in 2010, Pyari Shammo on Geo TV in 2009, Roshan Sitara as Riffat on Hum TV in 2012, Saij on Geo TV in 2009, Sanwali on Hum TV in 2010, Sherdil on ARY Digital in 2008, Shikan on PTV Home in 2010, Teray Aajaney Se on TVOne Global in 2006, Tere Baghair as Roohi on Hum TV in 2015–16, Tere Ishq Mein on Geo TV in 2006, and Tumhain Kuch Yaad Hai Jana on Geo TV in 2010.

== Personal life ==
Naheed married Amir Mirza on 16 January 2010.

== Filmography ==
=== Television ===
Television
Year	Title	Role	Network
2001	Dard Kay Faslay		PTV
2002	Ik Naye Mor Pe		PTV
2004	Be Zaban		PTV
2004	Chand Jalta Raha		PTV
2006	Tere Aa Janey Se		TV One
2006	Kanch Ke Jugnu		ATV
2006	Tere Ishq Mein		Geo Entertainment
2007	Bichrain Ge Ab kese		PTV
2008	Bint e Adam		PTV
2008	Sherdil		ARY Digital
2008	Khuab Toot Jatay Hain		Geo TV
2009	Pyari Shammo		Geo TV
2009	Saij		Geo TV
2009	Jeena Isi Ka Naam Hai		TVOne Global
2009	Aik Bechara		ARY Digital
2009	Gardish		ARY Digital
2009	Ishq		Hum TV
2009	Naseeb		Indus TV
2009	Tanveer Fatima (B.A)	Tanveer Fatima	Geo Entertainment
2009	Barh		PTV Home
2010	Tumhain Kuch Yaad Hai Jana		Geo TV
2010	Aankh Salamat Andhay Log	Chandni	ATV
2010	Pakistan Quarters		ATV
2010	Shikan		PTV Home
2010	Sanwali		Hum TV
2012	Aurat Aur Chardevari		PTV Home
2012	Roshan Sitara	Riffat	Hum TV
2012	Khushi Ek Roag	Shahida	ARY Digital
2012	Ghar		PTV Home
2013	Koi Lamha Gulab Ho	Faiqa	Hum TV
2014	Main Na Manu Haar	Sarwat	Hum TV
2014	Meri Anaya		Express Entertainment
2015	Akeli	Shahnaz	Hum TV
2015	Kaanch Kay Rishtay		PTV Home
2015-16	Tere Baghair	Roohi	Hum TV
2016-17	Haya Kay Rang	Sumbul	ARY Zindagi
2017	Mohabbat Zindagi Hai	Sofia	Express Entertainment
2017	Aao Laut Chalein		Geo Entertainment
2018−19	Mera Ghar Aur Ghardari	Fouzia.	Geo Entertainment
2018−19	Tawaan	Annie	Hum TV
2022	Ham 2 Hamare 100	Nafeesa Begum	Aan TV
2022	Zindgi Aik Paheli	Kulsoom	Geo Entertainment

== Accolades ==
Ceremony	Category	Project	Result
4th Lux Style Awards	Best Television Actress (Terrestrial)	Bezubaan	Nominated
8th Lux Style Awards	Best Television Actress (Terrestrial)	Kanch Kay Jugnoo	Nominated

== See also ==
- List of Pakistani actresses
