= Shahood Alvi =

Pakistani actor and director

- Born: 29 May 1973 (age 53); Multan, Punjab, Pakistan
- Occupations: Actor; Director
- Years active: 1997–present
- Children: 3, including Areeba Alvi

Shahood Alvi (Punjabi, Urdu:شہود علوی; born 29 May 1973, in Multan, Punjab) is a Pakistani actor and director.

== Personal life ==
Alvi's uncle, Iqbal Ansari is a well-known television director and producer. Iqbal Ansari married actress and writer Bushra Ansari in 1978 but they are now divorced.

He has three daughters, including the actress Areeba Alvi.

== Career ==
Shahood Alvi began his career as a boom operator for PTV in 1997. His work consisted of assisting the sound mixer, before he became an actor.

He is also a director, having directed the drama Chipkali in 2003.

== Controversies ==
=== Karachi University attack ===
In March 2010, Alvi visited Karachi University, where he was attacked by the female students because of his negative role in the serial Bol Meri Machli. According to Daily Nai Baat, he tried to explain to the students that the role had nothing to do with his real life but they did not believe him and hurled eggs and shoes at him.

== Filmography ==
=== Television serials ===
Year	Title	Role	Channel	Director
1999	Maa	Shahzad	PTV	
2000	Ab Yeh Mumkin Nahi	Khalid	PTV	
2002	Sheeshay Ka Mahal		PTV	
2003	Chipkali		PTV	Yes
2005	Mera Naam Hai Mohabbat		PTV	
2006	Kiran Kahani	Irfan	PTV	
2006	Makan	Akbar	Geo TV	
2008	Meri Adhoori Mohabbat		Geo Entertainment	
2008	Mukmala Aur Mahira		ARY Digital	
2009	Bol Meri Machli	Majaz Siddiqui	Geo Entertainment	
2010	Dil, Dard, Dhuan		ARY Digital	
2010	Vasl		Hum TV	
2011	Ladies Park	Kulsoom's husband	Geo Entertainment	
2011	Kitni Girhain Baqi Hain		Hum TV	
2012	Mere Huzoor	Sultan Bakht	Express Entertainment	
2012	Nadamat		Hum TV	
2012	Khushi Ek Roag		ARY Digital	
2012	Mera Saaein 2	Iftikar-ul-Ameen	ARY Digital	
2012	Maseeha		Hum TV	
2012	Daray Daray Naina		A-Plus Entertainment	
2013	Orangi Ki Anwari		TVOne	
2013	Nanhi	Zaman	Geo Entertainment	
2013	Teri Berukhi		Geo Entertainment	
2013	Meri Beti	Faisal	ARY Digital	
2013	Zindagi Teray Bina		Hum TV	
2014	Woh (season 2)	Zubair	Hum TV	
2015	Mujhe Kucch Kehna Hai	Moazzam	Geo Entertainment	Yes
2017	Aao Laut Chalein	Roshan	Geo Entertainment	Yes
2017	Zard Zamano Ka Sawera		ARY Digital	Yes
2018	Do Biwiyan Ek Bechara		ARY Digital	Yes
2018	Mere Khudaya	Sajid	ARY Digital	Yes
2019	Choti Choti Batain	Akaash's father	Hum TV	
2020	Tum Ho Wajah	Mansoor	Hum TV	
2020	Ghisi Piti Mohabbat	Khalil	ARY Digital	
2020	Dunk	Nawaz	ARY Digital	
2021	Azmaish	Tufail	ARY Digital	
2021	Aye Musht-E-Khaak	Sajjad	Geo Entertainment	
2022	Kaisi Teri Khudgharzi	Akram	ARY Digital	
2022	Mujhe Pyaar Hua Tha	Azhar	ARY Digital	
2023	Dil Hi Tou Hai	Khawar	Green Entertainment	
2024	Mohabbat Satrangi	Sabir	Green Entertainment	
2025	Main Zameen Tu Aasmaan	Shahabuddin	Green Entertainment	

=== Films ===
Year	Title	Role
2008	Ramchand Pakistani	Asif Hussain

== Awards ==
Ceremony	Category	Project	Result
9th Lux Style Awards	Best TV Actor (Terrestrial)	Jee Chahta Hai	Nominated
10th Lux Style Awards	Best TV Actor (Satellite)	Bol Meri Machli	Nominated
12th Lux Style Awards	Best TV Actor (Satellite)	Mere Huzoor	Nominated
