= Ghamand =

- Title screen
- Based on: Mustarad by Saira Raza
- Written by: Saira Raza
- Directed by: Asim Ali
- Starring: Noman Ijaz; Sunita Marshall; Minal Khan
- Opening theme: "Saudagar" Singer(s); Zoe Viccaji & Sohail Haider; Lyrics by Sohail Haider
- Country of origin: Pakistan
- Original language: Urdu
- No. of episodes: 25

Production
- Producer: Sadia Jabbar
- Running time: 32-40 minutes
- Production company: Sadia Jabbar Productions

Original release
- Network: A-Plus Entertainment
- Release: 29 June – 21 December 2018

Ghamand (transl. Vanity) is a Pakistani Urdu-language drama serial that began airing on A-Plus TV from 29 June 2018. The series was produced by Sadia Jabbar under their banner Sadia Jabbar Productions.

Noman Ijaz and Sunita Marshall played the lead roles with Minal Khan in a supporting role. It is adapted from Saira Raza's novel "Mustarad".

== Cast ==
- Noman Ijaz as Maqsood
- Sunita Marshall as Shahina
- Minal Khan as Hani
- Sadaf Aashan as Rashida
- Mahjabeen Habib as Shehnaz
- Munawar Saeed as Seth Sajawal
- Aiza Awan as Chandni
- Swaleh Qayyum as Haroon
- Afshan Qureshi as Mumtaz
- Saman Ansari as Zamarud
- Farooq Jawaid as Aizaz
- Benazir Khan as Azra

== Production ==
The serial was directed by Asim Ali, known for Mere Qatil Mere Dildar, and was produced by Sadia Jabbar Productions who previously produced the acclaimed film Balu Mahi in 2017. The drama features Noman Ijaz and Sunita Marshall in the lead. Both the actors had shared the screen for the first time after 8 years as they were last seen in Mera Saaein in 2010. Saman Ansari was also in the supporting role. She is famous for her role in the 2017 series Sammi and played the role of "Sitara Shah" in the blockbuster drama serial Khaani.
