= Akeli (TV series) =

- Genre: Drama
- Written by: Nuzhat Saman
- Directed by: Osama Ahmad Siddiqi; Nain Maniar
- Starring: Imran Aslam; Iqra Qureshi; Diya Mughal; Shamil Khan
- Opening theme: 'Akeli Hoon'
- Country of origin: Pakistan
- Original language: Urdu

Production
- Producer: Ironline Productions
- Running time: 15–20 minutes

Original release
- Network: Hum TV
- Release: 21 July – 5 November 2015

Akeli (Urdu: اَکیلی, lit. 'By Herself') is a 2015 Pakistani romantic drama series. It is based on a novel by Nuzhat Saman and aired on Hum TV. The series was directed by Nain Maniar and Osama Ahmad Siddiqi, and produced by Ironline Productions. The soap aired on Monday to Friday evenings. It ended on 5 November 2015.

== Cast ==
- Iqra Qureshi as Mahnoor
- Imran Aslam as Faizaan
- Diya Mughal as Fakhra
- Shamil Khan as Azfar
- Naveed Raza as Asif
- Sadia Ghaffar
- Parveen Akbar as Sidra and Sawera's mother
- Gul-e-Rana as Faizan's mother
- Madiha Rizvi /Naheed Shabbir (from ep 60 to 75) as Shahnaz
