= Mujhay Sandal Kar Do =

- Title screen
- Genre: Drama
- Written by: Syed Wasi Shah
- Directed by: Amjad Hussain Khan
- Theme music composer: Sohail Haider
- Opening theme: Song performed by Shabana Kausar
- Composer: U.K
- Country of origin: Pakistan
- Original language: Urdu

Production
- Executive producer: Syed Mukhtar Ahmed
- Editors: Syed Umer Ali; Sajjad Iqbal; Faizan Feroz
- Running time: ~19 minutes
- Production company: Golg Bridge Media

Original release
- Network: Hum TV
- Release: 14 November 2011 – 16 July 2012

Mujhay Sandal Kar Do (Urdu: مُجھے صَندل كردو, lit. 'Imbue me with your scent') is a Pakistani television series aired during 2011–12 on Hum TV. It is presented by Momina Duraid and features Fazila Qazi, Sonya Hussain, Janita Asma and Asma Abbas among others.

== Cast ==
- Soniya Hussain
- Fazila Kaiser
- Asma Abbas
- Janita Asma
- Babar Khan
