= Khushi Ek Roag =

- Title cover
- Genre: Drama
- Written by: Seema Munaf
- Directed by: Mohsin Mirza
- Starring: Yumna Zaidi; Shahood Alvi; Farhan Ally Agha; Naheed Shabbir; Ayaz Samoo; Jahanara Hai; Sami Khan; Qaiser Naqvi
- Country of origin: Pakistan
- Original language: Urdu
- No. of seasons: 1
- No. of episodes: 24

Original release
- Network: ARY Digital
- Release: 11 June 2012

Khushi Ek Roag (or Khushi Aik Roag) (Urdu: خوشی ایک روگ, lit. 'Happiness, A Malady') is a 2012 Pakistani drama serial. The serial was broadcast on ARY Digital on 11 June 2012. It is directed by Mohsin Mirza and written by Seema Munaf, starring Yumna Zaidi, Shahood Alvi, Farhan Ally Agha, Naheed Shabbir and Sami Khan.

== Plot ==
The characters portrayed by Shahood Alvi and Naheed Shabbir adopt a girl (played by Yumna Zaidi). When Shahood's father learns of this adoption, he is enraged and cuts all ties with him. Soon afterwards, their neighbors also adopted a son (played by Sami Khan).

The children eventually learn they are adopted. Yumna tries to find her biological parents and meets them. She learns that they (played by Saleem Iqbal and Kanwal Nazar) gave her away because they were poor and had three other daughters to support.

Her adoptive mother dies, after which she goes back to her biological parents.

== Cast ==
- Yumna Zaidi
- Shahood Alvi
- Farhan Ally Agha
- Naheed Shabbir
- Jahanara Hai
- Sami Khan
- Muhammad Faizan
- Qaiser Naqvi
- Agha Shiraz
- Saleem Iqbal
