= Phaans =

2021 Pakistani drama television series

- Title card
- Genre: Mystery; Thriller; Crime Drama
- Written by: Samina Ijaz
- Screenplay by: Shahzad Javed
- Directed by: Syed Ahmed Kamran
- Starring: Zara Noor Abbas; Sami Khan; Shehzad Sheikh
- Country of origin: Pakistan
- Original language: Urdu
- No. of episodes: 30

Production
- Producer: Momina Duraid
- Running time: 38 minutes approx.
- Production company: MD Productions

Original release
- Network: Hum TV
- Release: 20 February – 23 July 2021

Phaans (Urdu: پھانس, lit. 'Splinter / Sliver') is a Pakistani drama television series created and developed by Shahzad Javed, written by Samina Ijaz and directed by Syed Ahmed Kamran. It premiered on Hum TV on 20 February 2021. It features Sami Khan, Zara Noor Abbas and Shehzad Sheikh. Sheikh portrayed an anti-hero for the first time in his career. The series follows the struggle of a sexual assault survivor. The last of the 30 episodes aired on 23 July 2021.

The series was praised for its portrayal of social evils, and the performances of Sheikh and Abbas.

== Plot ==
The story begins by showing Shakeela working as a maid for the upper-class family of Nadia. Nadia's daughter Hafsa plans to marry Samad. To arrange the marriage and to serve as a helping hand, Shakeela stays at Nadia's house along with her daughters; Zeba and the younger Farah. Zeba, a college-going girl comes across with them. Sahil is Nadia's autistic son. At night, everyone is busy with the marriage.

Zeba receives a call from her fiancé, Hashim. He demands to see her and calls her in an under-construction building. Zeba at first refuses, but later agrees to meet him due to his insistence. Zeba goes there and someone rapes her. She returns to where everyone is already looking for her. She enters with Samad from the main gate and everyone there mistakes Samad as the culprit. Zeba is taken to hospital where a doctor changes the reports as Siraj had already called him and ordered him to declare her as a patient of hysteria. The doctor does and, disappointed, Zeba goes to her home with her mother. She tells everyone that Sahil is the culprit, but no one believes her. Samad helps Zeba to seek justice. Later Zeba learns that she is pregnant with Sahil's child. And plans to use the DNA test reports as an evidence to prove Sahil guilty of raping her.

Misunderstanding Farah and Hashim's mother goes to Samad's house and tell him that Zeba is going to be a mother of his child. Samad calls Zeba and Shakeela picks up. Shakeela thinks that Samad is the rapist and he blackmailed her to blame Sahil. Hashim and Farah marry.

Shakeela gives abortion pills to Zeba and kills her unborn child. Zeba goes to hospital to take the DNA results but the doctor says that there was a problem in the lab. Zeba makes a video against Sahil and puts it on social media where it goes viral.

Sahil is again hospitalised. Hafsa makes a video against Zeba and Samad. Nadia calls Zeba and tells her that she learned the truth about Sahil. Zeba and her mother go to Nadia's house and some news reporters are there.

Nadia says that Zeba lied for money. Zeba goes home. Farah learns of her pregnancy. Zeba and Shakeela reach home and Shakeela has an angina attack. Zeba takes Shakeela to the hospital. She tells Farah about Shakeela. Farah reaches the hospital and taunts Zeba that if she remained quiet, her mother would be fine. Shakeela and Zeba go home and Zeba decides that she will not fight for justice ever again. Shakeela tells Zeba to call Farah. Zeba goes to their house where she learns that Farah is pregnant. She pleads with Tai to let Farah come with her but she refuses. When Zeba arrives home she sees Shakeela dead.

Sahil becomes attracted to Resham. Siraj tells Resham to leave the house and holds her arm. She runs to Nadia and Nadia says that Siraj also tried to do it which he did with Zeba. Saba (Samad's mother) listens and tells Nadia that Shakeela is dead. Nadia visits Zeba and apologizes to her for what she did. Hashim comes to Zeba and apologizes to her for remaining quiet while he knew the real culprit. Samad asks him about the culprit. He says that while he was waiting for Zeba, he heard Zeba's scream and saw Sahil raping her. Sahil goes to Resham's room and tries to rape her while Nadia watches. Sahil thinks that Nadia doesn't know about his reality, but she learns about Sahil's reality. Nadia tells Sahil that she will expose his real face to everyone. Sahil goes to Zeba's house and tries to kill her, but Samad saves her. Nadia goes to a lawyer to file a case against Sahil. She tells Samad that she wants to meet Zeba. Samad takes Zeba to Nadia where Nadia tells him that she discovered Sahil's actions and files a case against Sahil. She takes Zeba to her house where everyone is shocked to see her with Nadia. Everyone asks Nadia to take her out of her house, but she refuses and stands with Zeba. Sahil pushes Zeba to withdraw the case but she refuses. Hafsa goes to Zeba and says leave us alone. Sahil knocks at the door and Hafsa hides in the closet. Sahil again tries to kill Zeba and Hafsa learns of Sahil's behavior. Zeba takes the gun from Sahil in order to save herself. Police come to take Sahil. When they see the gun in Zeba's hand they take her, too. Hafsa apologizes to Nadia about her behavior. Zeba is released from jail. Everyone learns about Sahil's misdeeds. Sahil is about to get punished for what he did. Farah apologizes to Zeba. Samad proposes to Zeba. Hafsa tells Zeba to marry Samad. But Farah is blessed with a daughter and Zeba names her "Umeed". Sahil is punished at the end. Zeba and Samad get along and Zeba is shown to be a powerful lawyer seeking justice for other women.

== Cast ==
- Zara Noor Abbas as Zeba
- Sami Khan as Samad
- Shehzad Sheikh as Sahil
- Yashma Gill as Hafsa, Sahil's sister
- Arjumand Rahim as Nadia, Sahil and Hafsa's mother
- Kinza Malik as Shakeela, Zeba and Farah's mother
- Ali Tahir as Siraj, Hafsa and Sahil 's father
- Mariam Mirza as Saba, Samad's mother
- Zain Afzal as Hashim, Zeba's fiancé
- Farah Nadir as Hashim's mother
- Madiha Rizvi as Shaista, Zeba and Nadia's lawyer
- Tahir Jatoi as Inspector
- Sufia Khan as doctor
- Hira Khan as Farah

== Production ==
The show was initially titled Badzaat. The serial was directed by Syed Ahmed Kamran, who previously directed serials such as Baandi and Zun Mureed. It was written by Samina Ijaz who previously collaborated with the director for the 2020s commercial-hit Mohabbat Na Kariyo. Noor Abbas was selected to portray Zeba and revealed in June 2021 that she had begun shooting for the series. Sheikh was selected to portray Sahil, who was initially hesitant to take on the role due to its dark nature, however was later convinced by director Ahmed Kamran to embark on the project. He prepared extensively for the role, researching autism and watching reference movies, however ultimately decided to approach the character with a clean slate.

== Reception ==
Phaans was noted for its powerful portrayal of a victim's fight for justice and its role in sparking conversations about violence and assault against women. The acting performances of Zara Noor Abbas and Shehzad Sheikh was praised by critics. In an article published in March 2021 in The Friday Times, the reviewer Zeinab Masud found the series to be a "good example of the mystery/thriller genre".

== Awards and nominations ==
Date	Award	Category	Recipient	Result
2022	8th Hum Awards	Best Actress - Popular	Zara Noor Abbas	Nominated
2022	8th Hum Awards	Hum Award for Best Actor in a Negative Role	Shahzad Sheikh	Won
