= Ahmad Bashir =

Pakistani journalist and writer

Ahmad Bashir احمد بشیر
- Born: 24 March 1923; Eminabad, Punjab, British India
- Died: 25 December 2004 (aged 81); Lahore, Punjab, Pakistan
- Occupations: Writer, Journalist
- Spouse: Mehmooda
- Relatives: Parveen Atif (Sister); Bushra Ansari (Daughter); Neelam Bashir (Daughter); Sumbul Shahid (Daughter); Asma Abbas (Daughter); Humayun Sheikh (Son); Grandchildren: Meera Ansari, Nariman Ansari, Waqas Abbas, Zara Noor Abbas, Saif Sheikh, Shiraz Nasir, Sadaf Nasir, Ahmed Nasir
- Writing career
- Subjects: Literature, biography, socialism
- Notable works: Dil Bhatkey Ga, Jo Milay Thay Raaste Mein, film Neela Parbat (1969)

Ahmad Bashir (Punjabi, Urdu: احمد بشیر; 24 March 1923 – 25 December 2004) was a writer, journalist, intellectual and film director from Pakistan. He was the father of leading television artists Bushra Ansari, Asma Abbas, Sumbul Shahid, poet and author Neelam Bashir, and Humayun Sheikh.

Begum Parveen Atif, also an Urdu short story writer, columnist, travelogue writer in Urdu and Punjabi, was his sister. His wife Mehmooda was his partner since 1947.

He was a close friend of Urdu writers Mumtaz Mufti and Ibn-e-Insha. Mumtaz Mufti helped him join the now defunct Urdu-language daily newspaper Imroze after the independence of Pakistan.

== Early life ==
Ahmad Bashir was born in Eminabad near Gujranwala, (Punjab, British India) on 24 March 1923. Of Kashmiri ethnic background, he received his Bachelor of Arts degree from Srinagar and shifted to Bombay for a career in acting but soon started writing for film magazines. After the formation of Pakistan in 1947, he came back to Punjab to settle permanently in Pakistan.

== Career ==
After the independence of Pakistan in 1947, Ahmad Bashir worked for several newspapers in Pakistan. However, he is known for his days at Daily Imroze with particular fondness. He worked as a sub-editor at Imroze where he introduced feature writing for the first time in Urdu press. He also obtained training in film direction from Hollywood on state scholarship.

Bashir also worked for the Department of Films & Publications, Government of Pakistan, and later for National Film Development Corporation, Pakistan (NAFDEC) during Zulfiqar Ali Bhutto regime. He resigned after General Zia-ul-Haq imposed martial law in the country in 1977. He faced bitter hardships during this period in which he was never allowed to write columns in newspapers.

Bashir was also a portrait writer. His book Jo Milay Thay Raaste Mein (My Fellow Travelers) contains pen sketches of eminent literary personalities including Mumtaz Mufti, Krishan Chandar, Meeraji, Chiragh Hasan Hasrat, Hasrat Mohani and Kishwar Naheed. He also wrote an autobiographical novel Dil Bhatkey Ga (The Restless Heart).

In 1969, Bashir directed and produced an Urdu film, Neela Parbat. This film was considered Pakistan's early experimental feature films. However, the film proved to be too much of an alternative genre at the time and flopped at the box-office.

After the failure of Neela Parbat, Bashir never ventured back into film making or film production.

== Awards and recognition ==
- Pride of Performance Award in 1994 by the President of Pakistan

== Death ==
Ahmad Bashir died in Lahore of liver cancer on 25 December 2004 at age 81.

== Selected works ==
Notable books by Ahmad Bashir
Title	Genre	Notes
Dil Bhatkay Ga (دل بھٹکے گا)	Essays, satire	A collection of his critical and humorous columns.
Jo Milay Thay Raaste Mein (جو ملے تھے راستے میں)	Essays, satire	Reflections on society, politics, and human nature.
Mein Aur Woh (میں اور وہ)	Memoir, essays	Blends personal anecdotes with social commentary.
