= Neelam Bashir =

Pakistani poet and writer (born 1950)

- نیلم بشیر
- Born: Neelam Ahmad Bashir; 17 January 1950 (age 76); Lahore, Punjab, Pakistan
- Other name: Neelum Basheer
- Education: Lahore College for Women; University of the Punjab
- Occupations: Fiction writer; Novelist; Poet; Travelogue writer; Critic; Researcher
- Years active: 1970 – present
- Spouse: Siraj Siddiqui (m. 1972)
- Children: 3
- Parent(s): Ahmad Bashir (father); Mehmooda Bashir (mother)
- Relatives: Musarrat Nazir (aunt); Parveen Atif (aunt); Sumbul Shahid (sister); Bushra Ansari (sister); Asma Abbas (sister); Zara Noor Abbas (niece)
- Honours: Pride of Performance award by the Government of Pakistan (2023)

Neelam Bashir (Urdu: نیلم بشیر; born January 17, 1950) is a Pakistani fiction writer, novelist, poet, travelogue writer, critic, and researcher who writes in both Urdu and Punjabi. She is known for her candid and fearless writing on sensitive social issues, particularly those concerning the female experience in a patriarchal society.

== Early life and education ==
Neelam Ahmad Bashir was born in Lahore, Punjab, Pakistan, on January 17, 1950. She is the eldest daughter of the acclaimed journalist, writer, intellectual, and filmmaker Ahmad Bashir and his wife Mehmooda Begum. Her paternal aunt, Parveen Atif, was also an Urdu short story writer. Her sisters are the well-known television personalities Bushra Ansari, Sumbul Shahid, and Asma Abbas.

She grew up in a liberal and culturally rich household in Lahore, where her parents encouraged their children to be expressive and intellectually curious. She received her early education from Lady Griffin Railway Girls High School, graduating in 1966. She earned a Bachelor of Arts degree from Lahore College for Women in 1970 and a master's degree in psychology from University of the Punjab in 1972.

After her marriage to Dr. Siraj Siddiqui in 1972, she moved to the United States, where she lived for fourteen years. She reportedly faced challenges pursuing her writing during this period due to her husband's disapproval. Upon returning to Pakistan, she established herself in the literary scene. She credits the renowned Urdu writer Mumtaz Mufti as a significant mentor who inspired her to pursue writing professionally.

== Career ==
Bashir is a prominent figure in contemporary Urdu literature. Her work is noted for its exploration of the complex issues related to the female psyche and social realities. She approaches her subjects with a modern, liberal, and impartial perspective, advocating for principles of feminism and humanism.

Her writing is often described as bold, honest, dynamic, and insightful, tackling controversial subjects without fear. She delves deep into the inner complexities of her characters, looking beyond external markers to explore their humanity. Her book Chaar Chand, a collection of autobiographical sketches about her life, family, and friends, is particularly noted for its candidness.

In addition to her literary pursuits, she has also worked in the advertising industry, writing Urdu copy, and has compiled a book of her parents' memoirs. Her work has been translated into other languages, including Hindi and Arabic.

== Personal life ==
Neelam Ahmad Bashir married Dr. Siraj Siddiqui in 1972 and subsequently moved to the United States with him. She divides her time between Pakistan and the United States, as all three of her children, a son, Humayun Sheikh, and two daughters, reside in the US.

== Awards and recognition ==
- Her book Taoos Faqat Rung was awarded by the Khalid Ahmad Literary Society.
- She was also a recipient of the "Katha Saman" award from the Almi Adbi Tanzeem of India for her remarkable work.
- She was honoured with Pride of Performance by Government of Pakistan in 2023.

== Bibliography ==
Neelam Ahmad Bashir has authored nearly ten books, including short story collections, a novel, essays, and travelogues.

- Gulaboon Wali Gali (Short stories)
- Jugnoon Kay Qaflay (Short stories)
- Lay Sans Bhi Ahista (Short stories)
- Wehshat Hi Sahi (Short stories)
- Nipal Nama (Travelogue)
- Situmgur Setember (Travelogue)
- Eik Thi Malika (Short stories)
- Chaar Chand (Autobiographical sketches/essays)
- Taoos Faqat Rung (Novel)
- Har Gucha Zakhmaya (Collection of Punjabi short stories)
- Do Tehreerain (Main Aur Ahmed Bashir...... Khoon Ki Lakeer) (Compilation of parents' memoirs)
