= Tere Baghair =

Pakistani drama series

- Genre: Family drama Romance film
- Written by: Sarwat Nazir
- Directed by: Owais Khan
- Starring: Hareem Farooq; Faisal Rehman; Shakeel; Zuhab Khan; Farhan Ali Agha; Azfar Rehman; Saleem Sheikh; Ismat Zaidi
- Theme music composer: Waqar Ali
- Opening theme: "Tere Baghair" by Sanam Marvi
- Country of origin: Pakistan
- Original language: Urdu
- No. of episodes: 16

Production
- Producer: Concepts
- Running time: 30-40 minutes

Original release
- Network: Hum TV, Hum Network Limited
- Release: 3 December 2015 – 28 January 2016

Tere Baghair (Urdu: تیرے بغیر, lit. 'Without you') is a Pakistani drama series which was first aired on Hum TV in 2015. It was directed by Owais Khan and written by Sarwat Nazir. It stars Hareem Farooq, Saleem Sheikh, Farhan Ali Agha, Shakeel, Zuhab Khan, Ismat Zaidi, Faisal Rehman.

== Characters ==
Rabia Salman
(Portrayed by Hareem Farooq) : Rabia is the female protagonist and Salman (Azfar Rehman)'s wife. She is the sister-in-law of Arslan, Ruhi and Saima.
Salman
(Portrayed by Azfar Rehman) : Salman is the male protagonist and husband of Rabia. He was gunned by thieves and was in a comma for 1 year. He has a brother Arslan (Shamil Khan).
Nisar
(Portrayed by Saleem Sheikh) : Nisar is the brother of Rabia and Iftikhar. He is the husband of Saima and brother-in-law of Ruhi.
Iftikhar
(Portrayed by Farhan Ali Agha) : Iftikhar is the brother of Rabia and Nisar. He is married to Ruhi. He has a son Hammad (Zuhab Khan) and a daughter Hania.
Ruhi Iftikhar
(Portrayed by Naheed Shabbir) : Ruhi is Saima's sister, Iftikhar's wife and Nisar's sister-in-law. She has a son Hammad (Zuhab Khan) and daughter Hania.
Saima Nisar
(Portrayed by Madiha Rizvi) : Saima is the sister of Ruhi, wife of Nisar and sister in law of Iftikhar. She was daughter-in-law of (Shakeel).
Wasi
(Portrayed by Faisal Rehman) : Wasi is Karamat's nephew, Saira's husband. Saira died of cancer but had her child Noor-ul-Ain. After his mother's death, he lived with his aunt Karamat until her death. After her death, his and Rabia's love story continued as they were alone in the house. Wasi made a deal that he is ready to give Salman's rupees if he only recovered. If he didn't then she (Rabia) must marry (Wasi). Rabia accepted the deal and was ready to marry but Salman recovered.
Karamat
(Portrayed by Ismat Zaidi) : Karamat is Rabia's children's teacher and aunt of Wasi (Faisal Rehman). She aids Rabia when she leaves her house. She dies in a car accident.
Arslan
(Portrayed by Shamil Khan) : Arslan is the male protagonist and Salman's brother. He does nothing to help his brother and also unlawfully takes Rabia's share.

== Plot ==
Tere Baghair is the story of married couple Rabia (Hareem Farooq) and Salman (Azfar Rehman). Rabia's life becomes difficult when Salman is shot by thieves and ends up in a hospital in a coma. Rabia has much difficulty when she moves to her brothers house with her two kids but her life becomes more miserable when her sisters-in-law start to trouble her by giving her work and insulting and taunting her time and again. Rabia leaves their house and goes to her elder sisters house but her brother in law also doesn't agree to keep Rabia. Rabia moves to her paternal home when her father (Shakeel) passes away from a heart attack. She lives there until Nisar slaps her on her living with Ruhi and Saima's cousin Haroon (Furqan Qureshi). She later finds her kids' teacher (Ismat Zaidi) and her nephew Wasi (Faisal Rehman) and lives there until she is forced to move her elder sister's home and lives there until Jamal expresses that Rabia shouldn't live there. She again moves to Wasi's home and acts as his aunt's daughter. Saima fells and is flown in hospital. Reports say that she will not bear a child in future and is as well miscouraged. On other side, condition again changes when Karamat's brothers call her and she prepares for her but dies of a car accident as her brothers tell this to Rabia. Nisar and Iftikhar always fight on money of plot because Nisar gets 25,00,000 out of 15,00,00,000 sold plot. Iftikhar promises him for next month that he will give penalty. Rabia becomes alone with Wasi. Wasi makes a deal of paying the money to save Salman but if he will not recover then she must have to marry me. Rabia accepts but cries. Hammad disappears but Iftikhar finds him as the critical condition. He calls all (Nisar, his sister-in-law and wife) and says that they had more they have done more to harm others which caused our this condition. Iftikhar and his family tries to forgive Rabia as well. Salman recovers but seeing her with Wasi, he forgets and ignores that she is his (own) wife. From many sources, he learns that Arslan is a thief (including from his wife). He takes apologance from his wife and Rabia forgives him and they live a happy life.

== Original soundtrack ==
Tere Baghair

Soundtrack album by Sanam Marvi
- Released: 25 November 2015
- Recorded: November 2015
- Genre: television soundtrack
- Length: 1:13
- Label: Concepts

The soundtrack of Tere Baghair was produced in the label of Concepts and written by Sarwat Nazir, a fiction writer.

== Cast ==
- Azfar Rehman as Salman
- Hareem Farooq as Rabia Salman
- Ismat Zaidi as Karamat
- Faisal Rehman as Wasi; Karamat's nephew
- Farhan Ali Agha as Iftikhar
- Naheed Shabbir as Ruhi Iftikhar
- Shamil Khan as Arslan
- Saleem Sheikh as Nisar
- Madiha Rizvi as Saima Nisar
- Shakeel as Rabia's, Nisar's, Iftikhar's father
- Birqees Farooqui as Madiha
- Hanif Bachan as Jamal
- Bushra Zahid
- Hammad
- Neha
- Zuhab Khan as Ruhi and Iftikhar's son
- Furqan Qureshi as Haroon; Ruhi and Saima's cousin
- Rehan Salim
- Qurrat-ul-Ain

== See also ==
- List of programs broadcast by Hum TV
- 2016 in Pakistani television
