= Chhalawa =

- Theatrical release Poster
- Directed by: Wajahat Rauf
- Written by: Wajahat Rauf; Yasir Hussain
- Produced by: Wajahat Rauf
- Starring: Mehwish Hayat; Azfar Rehman; Aashir Wajahat; Asad Siddiqui; Babar Khan; Mehmood Aslam
- Music by: Shiraz Uppal
- Production company: Showcase Films
- Distributed by: Hum Films
- Release date: 5 June 2019 (Eid al-Fitr)
- Country: Pakistan
- Language: Urdu
- Budget: Rs. 8 crore (US$290,000)
- Box office: Rs. 18.90 crore (US$680,000)

Chhalawa (ghost) (Urdu: چھلاوہ) is a Pakistani romantic comedy film, written, directed and produced by Wajahat Rauf under his Showcase Films and edited by Hasan Ali Khan. It stars Mehwish Hayat, Azfar Rehman, Zara Noor Abbas, Asad Siddiqui, Aashir Wajahat and Mehmood Aslam in pivot roles. It released on Eid al-Fitr, in June 2019, by Hum Films and Eveready Pictures.

Note: This dosen't represent real chhalawa (a ghost that stimulates fake scenes in real time or can control your mind ) (this is what people who experience believed)

== Cast ==
- Mehwish Hayat as Zoya
- Azfar Rehman as Samee
- Zara Noor Abbas as Haya
- Asad Siddiqui as Luqman
- Aashir Wajahat as Haroon
- Adnan Shah Tipu as Chaudhry Nazakut
- Mohsin Ejaz as Jalal Chaudhry
- Mehmood Aslam as Chaudhry Rafaqat; Zoya, Haya and Haroon's father
- Sarwan Ali Palijo as Sameer Friend

== Release ==
The film teaser was released on 28 March, while trailer was released on 24 April. The film was released on Eid al-Fitr.

=== Home media ===
Chhalawa had its World TV Premiere on Eid-ul-Adha, in August 2019 which was held by Hum TV.

=== Digital release ===
Chhalawa was made available on Amazon Prime Video for online streaming.

== Reception ==
=== Box office ===
It earned Rs. 6.4 crore in its first three days of release. After nine weeks it earned Rs. 17.4 crore domestically, and a lifetime of more than Rs. 17.5 crore. Chhalawa's total box office collected PKR 180 million

=== Critical reception ===
Hassan Hassan of Galaxy Lollywood rated the film 1.5 out of 5 stars saying that Chhalawa will not utterly disappoint you if you leave your brain outside the cinema.

== Soundtrack ==
Chhalawa

Soundtrack album by Shiraz Uppal
- Released: 1 June 2019
- Recorded: 2019
- Genre: Feature film soundtrack
- Length: 16:42
- Language: Urdu

Shiraz Uppal chronology
Punjab Nahi Jaungi (2017)	Chhalawa (2019)
External audio
- Chhalawa on iTunes

All lyrics are written by Shakeel Sohail; all music is composed by Shiraz Uppal.

Track listing
No.	Title	Singer(s)	Length
1.	"Chhalawa"	Nirmal Roy, Neha Chaudhry, Aashir Wajahat, Jabar Abbas	4:13
2.	"Chirriya"	Neha Chaudhry, Shiraz Uppal	4:10
3.	"Madhaniyan"	Neha Chaudhry, Haadi Uppal	4:06
4.	"Lahoriya" (from Karachi Se Lahore)	Shiraz Uppal, Ali Hamza	2:34
5.	"Chhalawa" (Dance Mix)	Jabar Abbas, Nirmal Roy, Neha Chaudhry, Aashir Wajahat	1:39
Total length:			16:42
