= 101 Talaqain =

Pakistani television series

- Genre: Dark Comedy
- Written by: Omer Ikram
- Directed by: Omer Ikram
- Starring: Zahid Ahmed
- Country of origin: Pakistan
- Original language: Urdu
- No. of episodes: 26

Production
- Production companies: Auj Production; Multiverse Entertainment

Original release
- Network: Green Entertainment
- Release: 13 July – 9 December 2023

101 Talaqain is a Pakistani television series that premiered on 13 July 2023 on the newly launched Green Entertainment. It is directed by Omer Ikram and produced by Auj Productions in association with Multiverse Entertainment. It stars Zahid Ahmed as Rustom Kavasji, an expert divorce lawyer with a record of hundred divorces on his credit.

== Plot ==
Rustom Kavasji is a divorce lawyer who has handled a hundred divorce cases in his career. His past heartbreak shaped his negative view of love and marriage.

The first case is of Sajjad and Aimen who was an ideal couple until the arise of problems in their lives. Sajjad contacts Rustom and tells him about his case. But somehow he gets so involved in their case.

== Cast ==
- Zahid Ahmed as Rustom Kowasjee
- Anoushay Abbasi as Aimen
- Faris Khalid as Sajjad
- Sana Askari as Aimen's mother
- Danial Afzal Khan as Aimen's father
- Hina Rizvi as Mrs. Raees
- Uroosa Siddiqui
- Srha Asghar
- Ghazala Butt as Faiza's mother
- Sadaf Aashan as Sajjad's mother
- Khaled Anam as Sajjad's father
- Farah Nadir as Nasreen
- Mojiz Hasan
- Kausar Siddiqui
- Ahmed Zeb
- Asim Mehmood
- Ayaz Samoo as Shafiq

== Production ==
The official trailer was released by the network in March 2023.

=== Broadcast ===
On 29 June 2023, the channel's social media handles stated that the show would premiere on 13 July 2023 airing episodes weekly on Thursday at 21:00 PST.

== Reception ==
Youlin Magazine praised Ikram's direction, camera work and performances of all the actors especially Ahmed. The News International panned the series for its black and white characters, predictable narrative, highlighting a rare cause of divorce instead of portraying real issues.
