= Aao Laut Chalein =

2017 Pakistani TV series

- Title card
- Genre: Family drama
- Written by: Abu Rashid
- Directed by: Shahood Alvi
- Starring: Shahood Alvi; Asim Mehmood; Naheed Shabbir; Azekah Daniel
- Opening theme: Kharay Pani Jaisa Pyaar by Ahmed Jahanzeb
- Country of origin: Pakistan
- Original language: Urdu
- No. of episodes: 18

Production
- Producer: Babar Javed
- Production location: Pakistan
- Running time: Approx 40 Minutes

Original release
- Network: Geo Entertainment
- Release: 4 March – 30 April 2017

Aao Laut Chalein (Urdu: آؤ لوٹ چلیں, lit. 'Let's Go Back') is a Pakistani drama serial directed by Shahood Alvi, produced by Babar Javed, and written by Abu Rashid. It stars Shahood Alvi along with Naheed Shabbir, Asim Mehmood, and Azekah Daniel. It aired every Saturday and Sunday at 9:00 PM. The story is about a young boy, Kashan, who left his house in search of his mother, who lives in Sukkur with her second husband.

== Synopsis ==
Aao Laut Chalein is the story of a boy Kashan who travels to Sukkur to search for his mother, Anila. Anila has been married to Ustad Roshan after getting divorced from her first husband, Aslam. After going through intense struggles, Kashan finally finds his mother, but she is unable to reciprocate the same feelings because Roshan does not want any association from her previous marriage. Anila tells Kashan to go back to Karachi, but instead, he begins to live a nomadic life. Kashan finally gets work in a car garage as a "Chota" without knowing that the garage belongs to Ustad Roshan. Ustad is unaware of this fact and gets very attached to "Chota".

When Kashan grows up, he has a garage of his own and specializes in vintage cars. He falls in love with Manar, the other protagonist of the story, who belongs to a higher social strata. She uses him as her, subject for an assignment, which is on cars. During this time he falls and confesses his love to her only to find out that she considered him a friend. Kashan thinks it's because they have different social classes and feels very doomed.

== Cast ==
- Asim Mehmood as Kashan
  - Anas Yasin as Young Kashan
- Azekah Daniel as Manar
- Shahood Alvi as Roshan
- Naheed Shabbir as Anila
- Rashid Farooqui as Aslam
- Faisal Naqvi
- Sami Sani
- Neelam Gul as Anzela
- Sheryaar Khan
