= Tawaan =

Pakistani television series

- Title screen
- Genre: Romantic drama; Teen drama
- Written by: Rahat Jabeen
- Directed by: Syed Wahb Jafri
- Starring: Emmad Irfani; Moomal Khalid; Asad Siddiqui; Hina Altaf
- Theme music composer: Nouman Javaid
- Opening theme: "Yaadon Ka Ye Saamaan"; Singer(s); Zohaib Hassan; Lyrics by Sabir Zafar
- Country of origin: Pakistan
- Original language: Urdu
- No. of seasons: 1
- No. of episodes: 30

Production
- Producer: Momina Duraid
- Camera setup: Multi-camera setup
- Production company: MD Productions

Original release
- Network: Hum TV
- Release: 5 July 2018 – 6 February 2019

Related
- Belapur Ki Dayan

Tawaan (Urdu: تاوان, lit. 'Ransom') is a 2018 Pakistani television drama serial which aired on Hum TV. Written by Rahat Jabeen, it stars Moomal Khalid and Emmad Irfani in lead roles, with Asad Siddiqui as the second lead. The series was produced by Momina Duraid Productions and directed by Syed Wahb Jafri.

It marks Hina Altaf's third on-screen appearance with Asad Siddiqui after Gumrah and Sodai, with Emmad Irfani after Aik Thi Misaal and Kuch Na Kaho and with Moomal Khalid after Natak. Siddiqui and Irfani also appeared together in Mah-e-Tamaam.

== Story ==
Shehroze and Mahnoor are a happily engaged couple who have been in love since childhood. They are soon to get married; however, Mahnoor is accidentally hit by the car of a spoilt young man, Zaman. The injuries prove fatal, and Mahnoor dies, leaving Shehroze shattered.

Driven by revenge, Shehroze is determined to make Zaman pay for Mahnoor's death by killing Zaman's fiancée, Maryam. Shehroze kidnaps Maryam and is about to crush her under his car but finds himself unable to do such a cruel thing to an innocent soul. He just leaves without harming Maryam. After that, Shehroz was embarrassed for his action. Maryam is judged by people who question her innocence because she was kidnapped. She asks Shehroz to compensate for his actions by marrying her. Shehroz agrees, and they start living happily, although Shehroze maintains a certain distance from Maryam because he wants to stay loyal to his first love, Mahnoor.

Then later on, Shehroze tells Maryam that she will always be a tawaan or price he paid for his actions, and therefore she leaves him and asks for a divorce. However, Shehroze doesn't want that, as he is starting to love her and doesn't want her to leave. Maryam hears Shehroze and his aunt, Shabana, talking about Maryam and how he loves her so much and can't live without her. Shabana then tells him that he should take Maryam back as she realises how upset everyone is that she left in the first place. Shehroze goes to Maryam's house and sees Zaman talking to her about getting together, and then Shehroze walks in, and Zaman then shoots Maryam. Maryam is then taken to the hospital and survives, and Shehroze confesses his love for her. Then Maryam and Shehroze get back together.

== Cast ==
- Emmad Irfani as Shahroz
- Moomal Khalid as Maryam
- Asad Siddiqui as Zaman
- Hina Altaf Khan as Mahnoor/Mano (Dead)
- Hina Khawaja Bayat as Shabana (Mano's mother)
- Fazila Kaiser as Tahera (Maryam's mother)
- Farhan Ali Agha as Wajahath (Maryam's father)
- Kaiser Khan Nizamani as Haider (Zaman's father)
- Annie Zaidi as Rayana (Zaman's mother)
- Munawwar Saeed as Irfan (Shehroze's father)
- Sajida Syed as Tabinda (Shehroze's mother)
- Naheed Shabbir as Annie (Shehroze's sister)

== Soundtrack ==
Tawaan - OST

Soundtrack album by Zohaib Hassan
- Released: 12 July 2018
- Recorded: 2018
- Genre: Television soundtrack
- Length: (2:39)
- Language: Urdu
- Label: Hum TV

Music video
- "Tawaan" OST on YouTube

The title song was sung by Zohaib Hassan. The music was composed by Waqar Ali and the lyrics were written by Sabir Zafar.

== Broadcast ==
It was aired on Hum Europe in the UK, on Hum TV UK in the United States, and on Hum TV Mena in the United Arab Emirates on the same day. All International broadcasting aired the series in accordance with their standard times.

In May 2020, the show began airing in Mauritius on MBC 2.

== See also ==
- List of programs broadcast by Hum TV
