= Parveen Atif =

Pakistani writer (1935–2018)

- پروین عاطف
- Born: Parveen Ghulam; 18 April 1935; Gujranwala, British Raj, British India
- Died: 24 November 2018 (aged 83); Lahore, Pakistan
- Resting place: H-11 Graveyard, Islamabad
- Other name: Begum Parveen Atif
- Education: Madrasa Al-Banat; University of the Punjab
- Occupations: Writer; Columnist; Novelist
- Years active: 1950 – 2018
- Spouse: Manzoor Hussain Atif (husband)
- Children: 4
- Parent: Ghulam Hussain (father)
- Relatives: Musarrat Nazir (cousin); Ahmad Bashir (brother); Neelam Bashir (niece); Sumbul Shahid (niece); Bushra Ansari (niece); Asma Abbas (niece); Zara Noor Abbas (grand-niece)

Parveen Atif (Urdu: پروین عاطف; April 18, 1935 – November 24, 2018) was a Pakistani Urdu fiction writer, short story writer, columnist, and a pioneer of women's field hockey in Pakistan.

== Early life and education ==
Parveen Atif was born in 1935 in Aymanabad, a town near Gujranwala, British India (now Pakistan). She came from an educated and literary family. Her father, Ghulam Hussain, held a master's degree in history and Persian, worked as a teacher, and was a poet. Her mother had a keen interest in fine arts and literature.

Her brother, Ahmad Bashir, became a renowned journalist and writer. Parveen Atif was the maternal aunt of the famous actress and writer Bushra Ansari and the Urdu short story writer Neelam Bashir.

Parveen Atif moved to Lahore with her brother Ahmad Bashir, and resumed her education at Madrasa Al-Banat. She pursued her higher education at the University of the Punjab, where she completed a Master of Arts (MA) in Sociology. During her time at university, she met Olympian and prominent hockey player Brigadier Manzoor Hussain Atif, whom she later married. They had two sons, Dr. Gul Atif and Shan Atif, and two daughters, Zil Atif and Shikoh Atif.

== Career ==
Parveen Atif led a dual career, making significant contributions to both literature and sports administration.

Parveen Atif was the story writer for the 2022 Pakistani film Khel. The screenplay was written by Sameel and it was directed by her son Zill-e-Atif, focuses on a social issue involving child trafficking and features young protagonists.

=== Literary ===
Parveen Atif was primarily a fiction and short story writer, known for an individualistic style that blended traditional and modern narrative techniques. She saw events and characters from her own distinct perspective, adding great color and appeal to her writing. She also wrote a long-running column titled "Main Sach Kehongi" for a national newspaper.

Her extensive travels as a sports administrator influenced her writing, leading her to write several travelogues in addition to fiction.

=== Sports administration ===
Parveen Atif is counted among the pioneers of women's field hockey in Pakistan. She served as the first president of the Pakistan Hockey Federation's (PHF) Women's Wing for sixteen years, playing a crucial role in promoting the sport for women.

During her tenure, she organized numerous domestic hockey events and facilitated the first international tours for the women's national team, hosting teams from Ireland, Malaysia, and China in Pakistan. She also served as a member of the International Hockey Federation (FIH) and as the vice president of Asian Women's Hockey.

Her husband, Brigadier Manzoor Hussain Atif, was a highly decorated Olympian and administrator who managed Pakistan's gold medal-winning teams at the 1968 and 1984 Olympics.

== Personal life ==
Parveen Atif married Brigadier Manzoor Hussain Atif. The marriage was reportedly facilitated with the approval of her brother, Ahmad Bashir. Together, they had two sons, Dr. Gul Atif and Shan Atif, and two daughters, Zil Atif and Shikoh Atif.

== Death ==
Parveen Atif died on November 24, 2018.

== Bibliography ==
Parveen has authored nearly 8 books, including short story collections, a novel, essays, and travelogues.

- Main Meeli Piya Ujlay (Fiction)
- Subh-e-Kaazib (Fiction)
- Kiran Titli Aur Bigoolay
- Tapar Wasni
- Bol Meri Machli (Fiction)
- Ajab Ghari Ajab Afsana (Fiction)
- Ek Thi Shadi (Fiction)
- Sheesha Ghar (Afsanay - short stories)
- Shab Raftah

== Legacy ==
Her services to Pakistani literature and her pioneering role in establishing women's hockey are widely acknowledged. PHF Secretary Asif Bajwa stated that her services to the sport would always be remembered.
