= 10th Lux Style Awards =

Pakistani film awards ceremony

- Date: 17 September 2011
- Site: Expo Centre, Karachi
- Hosted by: Mahira Khan, BNN boys (Murtaza Chaudhry, Mubeen Gabol and Mohsin Abbas Haider)
- Produced by: Frieha Altaf
- Directed by: Adnan Malik
- Organized by: Unilever Pakistan

Television coverage
- Channel: ARY Digital

The 10th Lux Style Awards ceremony was held on 17 September 2011 at the Expo Center in Karachi, Pakistan. The show was hosted by Mahira Khan, Faizan Haque and from the members of BNN. The show had the performances by HSY and Reema Khan, Aaminah Haq, Ammar Bilal, Meera, Mahira Khan, and Ahsan Khan. Special tribute was paid to the late Moin Akhter. Some of the film and music categories were removed from the award.

== Winners and nominations ==
=== Television ===
Categories	Winners	Nominations
Best Television Play (Terrestrial)	Anokha Ladla-PTV	Ghar Ki Khatir-PTV; Pal Bhar Mein-ATV; Tinkay-PTV; Uss Paar-ATV
Best Television Actor (Terrestrial)	Javed Sheikh-Pal Bhar Mein (ATV)	Saleem Sheikh-Anokha Ladla (PTV); Ahsan Khan-Shikan (PTV); Babar Ali-Uss Par (ATV); Adnan Jillani-Anokha Ladla (PTV)
Best Television Actress (Terrestrial)	Sania Saeed-Hawa Rait aur Angan (PTV)	Beenish Chohan-Ghar Ki Khatir (PTV); Erum Akhtar-Shikan (PTV); Saba Faisal-Pal Bhar Mein (ATV); Saba Qamar-Tinkay(PTV)
Best Television Play (Satellite)	Bol Meri Machli-Geo TV	Daam-ARY Digital; Dastaan-Hum TV; Ijazat-ARY Digital; Malaal-Hum TV
Best Television Actor (Satellite)	Faisal Qureshi-Meri Zaat Zarra-e-Benishan (Geo TV)	Fahad Mustafa-Haal-e-Dil (ARY Digital); Fawad Khan-Dastaan (Hum TV); Shahood Alvi-Bol Meri Machli (Geo TV); Sajid Hasan-Thori Si Wafa Chahiye (Geo TV)
Best Television Actress (Satellite)	Bushra Ansari-Dolly Ki Ayegi Baraat (Geo TV)	Aamina Sheikh-Agar Tum Na Hotay (Indus Vision); Savera Nadeem-Diya Jalay (ARY Digital); Samiya Mumtaz-Meri Zaat Zarra-e-Benishan (Geo TV); Sanam Baloch-Dastaan (Hum TV)
Best Television Director	Haissam Hussain-Dastaan (Hum TV)	Amir Yousaf-Anokha Ladla (PTV); Mehreen Jabbar-Daam (ARY Digital); Haseeb Hassan-Bol Meri Machli (Geo TV); Yasir Nawaz-Thori Si Wafa Chahiye (Geo TV)
Best Television Writer	Umera Ahmad-Meri Zaat Zarra-e-Benishan (Geo TV)	Asghar Nadeem Syed-Bol Meri Machli (Geo TV); Vasay Chaudhry & Bushra Ansari-Dolly Ki Ayegi Baraat (Geo TV); Khalil-ur-Rehman-Mein Mar Gayi Shaukat Ali (A Plus); Zafar Mairaj-Ghar Ki Khatir (PTV)

=== Music ===
Categories	Winners	Nominations
Best Artist of the Year	Mauj-Technicolor	Kaavish-Gunkali; Seige-Police
Best Singer of the Year	Shallum & Zara Madani-Payaam	Atif Aslam & Strings-Khud Kuch Karna Parega; Symt-Zamana
Best Music Producer	Rohail Hyatt-Coke Studio	Faisal Rafi-Gunkali
Best Video Director	Bilal Lashari-Shor Macha	Kamran Yar Kami-Zamana; Shahbaz Sumar-Mera Des

=== Fashion ===
Category	Winner	Nominations
Best Model of the Year (male)	Iftikhar Zafar	Abdullah Ejaz; Arsalan; M.Mubarak; Rohail Peerzada
Best Model of the Year (female)	Rabia Butt	Ayaan; Mehreen Syed; Cybil Chowdhry; Nooray Bhatty
Best Emerging Talent in Fashion	Maheen Hussain	Akif Mehmood; Amna Ilyas; Ali Xeeshan; Mohsin Ali; Shamal Qureishi-Tony & Guy
Best Fashion Photographer/Videographer	Rizwan-ul-Haq	Ayaz Anis; Fayyaz Ahmed; Maram Azmat & Abroo Hashmi; Rizwan Baig
Best Fashion Makeup & Hair Artist	Creative Team at Nabila	Maram Azmat; Raana Khan; Nighat Misbah; Saba Ansari
Best Achievement in Fashion Design (Prét)	Khaadi	Kamiar Rokni; Iman Ahmed at Body Focus; Sara Shahid at Sublime; Sonya Batla
Best Achievement in Fashion Design (Luxury Prét)	Shameel Ansari	Deepak Perwani; Rana Noman at Bareeze; Sadaf Malaterre; Shehla Chatoor
Best Achievement in Fashion Design (Lawn)	Sana Safinaz	Junaid Jamshed; Shameel Ansari; Sonya Battla; Yahsir Waheed
Best Achievement in Fashion Design (Menswear)	Ismail Farid	Hassan Sheheryar Yasin; Republic; Shakil Saigol; Ammar Belal
Best Retail Brand	Khaadi	Daaman; Fnk Asia; Generation; Gulabo

=== Special ===
Category	Winner
Best Dressed Male	HSY
Best Dressed Female	Aamina Sheikh
Most Stylish Sportsperson	Aisam-ul-Haq
Lux Icon of Beauty	Reema Khan
Special Tribute	Moin Akhter
Lifetime Achievement Award in Fashion	Samina Ibrahim
Chairperson's Lifetime Achievement	Mehnaz Begum
