= Bol Meri Machli =

- Created by: Iqbal Ansari
- Written by: Asghar Nadeem Syed
- Directed by: Haseeb Hassan
- Starring: Tooba Siddiqui; Tehreem Zuberi; Sadia Shaikh; Ayesha Khan; Shahood Alvi; Samina Ahmed; Sami; Fahad Mustafa; Javed Sheikh; Behroze Sabzwari
- Theme music composer: Waqar Ali
- Opening theme: Bol Meri Machlee by "Shabnam Majeed"
- Country of origin: Pakistan
- Original language: Urdu
- No. of episodes: 28

Production
- Editor: M.Aamir Qureshi
- Camera setup: Multi-camera setup

Original release
- Network: Geo Entertainment
- Release: 27 November 2009 – 23 April 2010

Bol Meri Machli is a Pakistani social drama series which premiered on Geo Entertainment. It stars Ayesha Khan, Tooba Siddiqui, Tehreem Zuberi, and Sadia Shaikh in lead roles. The series revolves around the journey of four lower middle-class women and their aspirations. The drama is considered one of the boldest reality-based dramas in Pakistani television history with taboo subjects covering, among others, extramarital affairs, premarital sex, and homosexuality.

At the 11th Lux Style Awards, it won Best TV Play - Satellite out of three nominations.

== Plot summary ==
Hailing from a lower middle-class family, the daughters of Professor Waheed, Noreen, Sahaab, Rubab, and Maheen are motivated by their father to pursue careers in their fields of interest. However, things don't go according to the plan.

== Cast ==
- Tooba Siddiqui as Noreen
- Ayesha Khan as Sahaab
- Tehreem Zuberi as Rubab
- Sadia Shaikh as Maheen
- Samina Ahmed
- Sami Khan
- Fahad Mustafa
- Shahood Alvi as Majaz Siddiqui
- Sabahat Ali Bukhari as Khala
- Javed Shaikh
- Ayesha Khan as Asma
- Azra Mohyeddin as Maheen's mother
- Faisal Shah
- Mazhar Ali
- Behroze Sabzwari
- Saife Hassan as Ashar

== Accolades ==
Year	Awards	Category	Recipient(s)/ nominee(s)	Result	Ref.
2011	Lux Style Awards	Best TV Play - Satellite	Bol Meri Machli	Won	
2011	Lux Style Awards	Best TV Director	Haseeb Hassan	Nominated	
2011	Lux Style Awards	Best TV Actor - Satellite	Shahood Alvi	Nominated	
2011	Lux Style Awards	Best TV Writer	Asghar Nadeem Syed	Nominated	
