= Asma Abbas =

Pakistani actresses

- اسما عباس
- Born: 15 August 1958 (age 67); Lahore, Punjab, Pakistan
- Occupation: Actress
- Years active: 1978–present
- Notable work: Fifty Fifty
- Children: 3, including Zara Noor Abbas
- Father: Ahmad Bashir
- Relatives: Parveen Atif (aunt); Neelam Bashir (sister); Bushra Ansari (sister); Sumbul Shahid (sister); Asad Siddiqui (son-in-law)

Asma Abbas (Urdu: اسما عباس) is a Pakistani actress, producer, singer and host known for her supporting roles in Urdu films and television dramas. She played the role of Fehmida in the acclaimed 2018 serial Ranjha Ranjha Kardi. She hosted celebrity talk show Awaz Day Kahan Hai on ATV.

== Early life ==
Abbas is the daughter of writer and journalist Ahmad Bashir and the sister of actors Bushra Ansari and Sumbul Shahid. She is also the mother of actress Zara Noor Abbas. In 2018, she successfully recovered from cancer.

== Career ==
Some of her notable performances include Dastaan (2010), Gohar-e-Nayab (2013), Nanhi (2013), Laado Mein Pali (2014), Laaj (2016), Koi Chand Rakh (2018) and Beti (2018). In 2018, her portrayals of Fehmida, the loving mother of a mentally challenged person in Ranjha Ranjha Kardi and Bakhtawar, the rigid matriarch of a family in Khudparast were acclaimed critically.

In 2019, she played Dildar Begum in the historical drama Deewar-e-Shab. The same year, she appeared in the talk show Speak Your Heart With Samina Peerzada.

Abbas' performance along with Uzma Beg, as feuding, social media-obsessed grandmothers in the 2021 comedy series Chupk Chupke were hailed as "simply brilliant" by the DAWN Images.

== Other work ==
Abbas ventured into the fashion industry in July 2020 by launching her clothing line, Asma Abbas Designs, a brand specializing in traditional day-to-day wear. The collection is a tribute to the female actors of Pakistan, naming items after actresses like Roohi Bano, Zeba Bakhtiar and Samina Peerzada, to name a few.

== Filmography ==
=== Film ===
Year	Title	Role	Notes	Ref(s)
2018	Maan Jao Na	Neelo	Also playback singer for song "Ishq Bekaar"	
2018	Teefa in Trouble	Khalida Butt, Butt Sahab's wife		
2019	Superstar	Choti Ammi		

=== Television ===
Year	Title	Role	Network	Notes	Ref(s)
2009	Tum Jo Miley	Naila		Ramadan special series	
2009	Muhabbat Yun Bhi Hoti Hai				
2010	Dastaan	Sultana, Rabia's Mother			
2010	Chunri	Shakila			
2011	Mujhay Sandal Kardo				
2011	Tera Pyar Nahi Bhoole				
2012	Behkawa				
2012	Sasural Ke Rang Anokhay				
2013	Love, Life Aur Lahore				
2013	Nanhi	Shammo Tai			
2013	Mann Ke Moti	Nasreen, Rahil's Mother			
2014	Dhol Bajnay Laga	Laila Begum			
2014	Quddusi Sahab Ki Bewah	Durdana			
2014	Ladoon Mein Pali	Bilquees, Laraib's Aunt a.k.a. Badi Ammi			
2014	Choti				
2014	Saari Bhool Hamari Thi				
2014	Sultanat-e-Dil				
2015	Gohar-e-Nayab	Sami's mother			
2015	Khoobsurat	Zarnish's mother			
2015	Maikey Ko Dedo Sandes				
2015	Abro	Sakina		Nominated—Hum Award for Best Supporting Actress	
2015	Ishq Ibadat				
2015	Yeh Ishq				
2015	Tumhari Natasha	Ahmer's mother			
2016	Laaj	Bari Sahiba			
2016	Natak				
2016	Dil Lagi	Mishal & Anmol's mother	ARY Digital		
2016	Maamta				
2017	Daldal	Sakina			
2017	Karam Jali				
2017	Larka Karachi Ka Kuri Lahore Di				
2017	Meraas				
2018	Ghughi	Parwati			
2018	Beti	Shahana Dadi; Hashim's mother			
2018	Koi Chand Rakh	Zain's mother			
2018	Ranjha Ranjha Kardi	Hamida, Bhola's mother			
2018	Khudparast	Bakhtawar, Hannan's mother			
2019	Rani Nokrani				
2019	GT Road		A-Plus Entertainment		
2019	Deewar-e-Shab	Dildar Begum	Hum TV		
2020	Jhooti	Nirma's mother	ARY Digital		
2020	Makafaat		Geo Entertainment	Episode 19	
2020	Bhabi Nazar Laga Dengi	Arfa Bhabi	ARY Digital	Telefilm	
2020	Dikhawa		Geo Entertainment	Episode 23	
2020	Zebaish	Nadira	Hum TV		
2021	Chupke Chupke	Naik Parwar aka Bebe	Hum TV		
2021	Khuda Aur Muhabbat	Suriyaa Bibi	Geo Entertainment	Season 3	
2021	Laapata	Samina, Geeti's Mother,	Hum TV		
2022	Chaudhry and Sons	Nimoo	Geo Entertainment		
2022	Fraud	Kulsoom	ARY Digital		
2022	Qalandar	Safia	Geo Entertainment		
2023	Kuch Ankahi	Zareena	ARY Digital		
2023	Sukoon	Sultana	ARY Digital		
2024	Khumar	Durdana, Nasir's mother	Geo Entertainment		
2024	Radd	Samina	ARY Digital		
2024	Baby Baji Ki Bahuein	Rizwana	ARY Digital		
2025	Ek Jhooti Kahani	Amma Ji	Hum TV		
2025	Muamma	Ami	Hum TV		
TBA	Winter Love †	TBA	Hum TV		

=== Music videos ===
Year	Title	Artist	Notes
2000	"Haye Meri Angothian"	Bushra Ansari, Asma Abbas	
2019	"Hamsaye maa jaye"	Bushra Ansari, Asma Abbas	
2020	"Ye Watan Tumhara Hai"	Various	
