= Hina Ki Khushboo =

Pakistani television drama series

- Genre: Family drama
- Written by: Shabnam Sani
- Directed by: Sami Sani
- Starring: Shameen Khan; Babar Khan; Arez Ahmed
- Country of origin: Pakistan
- Original language: Urdu
- No. of episodes: 52

Production
- Producer: Babar Javed
- Production location: Pakistan
- Running time: Approx 40 Minutes

Original release
- Network: Geo Entertainment
- Release: 29 November 2017 – 14 April 2018

Hina Ki Khushboo is a 2017 Pakistani drama serial directed by Sami Sani, produced by Babar Javed and written by Shabnam Sani. The drama starred Shameen Khan, Babar Khan and Arez Ahmed in lead roles, and first aired from 29 November 2017 on Geo Entertainment, where it aired on Thursdays, Fridays and Saturdays at 9:00 P.M. The story revolves around the life of an innocent young woman named Hina who faces complications after her marriage.

== Cast ==
Cast of the serial include;

- Shameen Khan as Hina
- Babar Khan as Adil
- Farah Ali as Faisal
- Arez Ahmed as Azlan
- Nazli Nasr as Iffat
- Aleezey Tahir as Pari
- Hasan Khan as Khurram
- Sajid Shah as Hashim
- Farah Nadir as Zainab
- Sadaf Aashan as Achi Phuphoo
- Anwar Iqbal as Samad
- Salma Qadir as Savera
