= Dharkan (TV series) =

Pakistani television drama series

- Genre: Family drama Romantic drama
- Created by: Momina Duraid
- Written by: Edison Idrees
- Directed by: Fahim Burney
- Creative directors: Atif Rathore; Imtiaz Aijaz Khan
- Starring: Adeel Chaudhry; Zara Noor Abbas; Omer Farooq; Javed Sheikh; Waseem Abbas; Ghana Ali
- Theme music composer: Sohail Haider
- Opening theme: "Dharkan Dharkan Per Ab To Tera Naam Saja"; Singer; Sohail Haider; Lyrics by Sohail Haider
- Composer: Aamir
- Country of origin: Pakistan
- Original language: Urdu
- No. of episodes: 20

Production
- Producer: Momina Duraid
- Production locations: Karachi, Nathiagali, Muree
- Cinematography: Adnan Ahmad Khan
- Editors: Editors; Ahmed Ali Gharyani; Mehboob; Chief Editor(s); Rajesh Kumar; Promotion Editor(s); Syed Asif Hussain
- Camera setup: Multi-camera setup
- Production company: MD Productions

Original release
- Network: Hum TV
- Release: 3 June – 21 October 2016

Dharkan (Urdu: دھڑکن ; lit: Heartbeat) is a Pakistani television series that aired on Hum TV in 2016. It was produced by Momina Duraid under her banner MD Productions and directed by Fahim Burney. It aired Friday nights at 9:10pm PST. It stars debutant Zara Noor Abbas along-with Adeel Chaudhry, Waseem Abbas, Javed Sheikh, and Shameen Khan.

== Plot ==
Dharkan is the story of the music-loving Areen. This full of life girl is adored by her family, but has a life-threatening ailment and doesn't have long to live. The story starts with Areen speaking about her life and her parents worrying about her condition. Daniyal is Areen's cousin and he falls in love with Areen. But another entry in the story was of Zaran who was a playboy but he fell in love with Areen. The story in drama as their lives take a lot of twists with the new love in between (daniyal). At the end Like every story this story also ends with Areen and Zaran marrying each other.

== Cast ==
- Zara Noor Abbas as Areen
- Omer Farooq as Daniyal
- Adeel Chaudhry as Zaran
- Waseem Abbas as Nafees (Areen's father)
- Javed Sheikh as Arif (Zaran's father)
- Hanif Bachan as Shirazi (Doctor)
- Ghana Ali as Esha
- Shameen Khan as Shehrbano (Zaran's fiancée)
- Farah Nadeem as Samina (Daniyal's mother, Hajra's sister)
- Anas Ali Imran as Yasir (Zaran's friend)
- Beena Chaudhary as Hajra (Samina's sister, Areen's mother)
- Anjum Habibi as Seema (Zaran's mother)

== Production ==
Dharkan was directed by Fahim Burney and featured Zara Noor Abbas in her acting debut. Her audition was approved by Burney after which she was asked to return from New York for the series. Adeel Chaudhry revealed his part in the project in February 2016, with filming commencing in the first quarter of the same year.

== See also ==
- 2016 in Pakistani television
- List of programs broadcast by Hum TV
