= Seeta Bagri =

- Genre: Romantic drama; Serial drama
- Written by: Iqbal Hussain
- Directed by: Iqbal Hussain
- Country of origin: Pakistan
- Original language: Urdu
- No. of seasons: 1
- No. of episodes: 31

Production
- Producer: Cereal Entertainment
- Production location: Pakistan
- Running time: Approx 40 minutes

Original release
- Release: 17 November 2016 – 15 June 2017

Seeta Bagri (Urdu: سیتا باگڑی) is a Pakistani television series which aired on TV One, from 17 November 2016 to 15 June 2017. It is produced by Adnan Siddiqui under their banner Cereal Entertainment. Set against the backdrop of a minority Hindu community in Karachi, the title role was played by Sarwat Gillani while Bushra Ansari, Syed Jibran and Hassan Niazi played the pivot roles.

It was re-telecast on PTV Home from November 2019 to March 2020 every Friday and Saturday at 7.00 P.M.

== Cast ==
- Bushra Ansari as Nandini Kumari
- Hassan Niazi as Akash Chopra
- Qavi Khan as Badrinath Bagri
- Sarwat Gilani as Seeta Bagri
- Shabbir Jan as Saeen
- Syed Jibran as Ratan Lal
- Shameen Khan as Mala Rani
- Raeed Muhammad Alam as Taimur Jaki
- Vasiya Fatima as Alizey

Minor characters:

- Tariq Butt as Police inspector
- Khawaja Saleem as Nathu Hakeem
- Zubi majeed as Pooja
- Asad Butt as Fahad ( Alijey's cousin )
- Abu Rohan as Haji
- Sehzad Raza as thekedar Chacha ( friend of Badrinath and Mamaji of Akash )
- Sajeerudin as Boss of Insan Dost foundation
- Hanif Mohammad as Lawyer, father of Taimur
- Sameera Hassan as Doctor

== Accolades ==
Year	Award	Category	Recipients	Result
2018	Lux Style Awards	Best Television Actress	Bushra Ansari	Nominated
