= Darbadar Tere Liye =

- Genre: Drama; Romance
- Written by: Sarwat Nazir
- Directed by: Syed Atif Hussain
- Starring: Shagufta Ejaz; Babar Khan; Fatima Effendi; Sana Askari; Mariya Khan; Sohail Asghar; Ahmed Hassan
- Opening theme: "Darbadar, Tere Liye, Ghaniyon me hum akele" by Adeeb Ahmed
- Country of origin: Pakistan
- Original language: Urdu
- No. of episodes: 21

Production
- Producers: Evolution Media Productions & Angelic F
- Editor: Zubair Faiyaz
- Running time: 30 – 45 minutes

Original release
- Network: Hum TV
- Release: 22 December 2014 – 18 January 2015

Darbadar Tere Liye (Urdu: دربدر تیرے لیے; lit: Wandering door to door for you) is 2014 Pakistani romantic drama serial that aired from 22 December 2014 to 18 January 2015 on Hum TV.

== Synopsis ==
Begum/Maa/Aapa Begum (Shagufta Ejaz) is an overbearing woman who runs her household, of numerous servants and children, with an iron fist. The reason for this being that she was widowed at a very early age and was left solely responsible for her husband's vast inheritance and three children; daughters Batool Zehra, Manahil and son Paras (Babar Khan).

Her strong hold and unconditional love for her son has made him a mama's boy who prefers staying at home painting and writing poetry instead of taking interests in the worldly affairs. Something that really worries his phuppho (Seemi Pasha) and phuppha, as their daughter is betrothed to him and they see him as a failure in life (the betrothed daughter is yet to make an appearance).

Beghum fails to see any shortcomings in her son and remains adamant that she won't quit pampering him, going as far as saying:

"Agar wo chand sitaray bhi mangenge tou mai aasman se tordh ke laongi."

In stark contrast to Paras, Iman (Fatima Effendi), daughter of Beghum's servant Munawwar (Sohail Asghar), is a bold confident girl who flies kites, plays cricket and shuns hand-me-downs given to her by Beghum. Iman's mother left her when she was a baby and she has been bought up by her father in Beghum's household.

She dreams of big houses and expensive cars and studies Home Economics. Her educational fee is also one of Beghum's many favours to her hence her straight forwardness and boldness irks Beghum very much who wants to break her spirit and mould her like the other obedient servants.

The first episode sees the two leads, Paras and Iman engage in harmless chatter and there are no signs of attraction between the two as they are poles apart. But then again opposites attract and their love affair is bound to happen for the sake of the drama's continual.

=== Verdict ===
Shugufta Ejaz proved once again her seniority as an actor but the rest of the cast was just okay. Babar Khan's acting was confusing and Fatima Effendi was also not very outstanding.

It is not a drama that will top the viewers weekly watch list but it is an option for when nothing good is on TV and one has some time to kill.

== Cast ==
- Shagufta Ejaz as Aapa/Begum
- Babar Khan as Paras
- Fatima Effendi as Iman
- Mariya Khan
- Sana Askari
- Sohail Asghar as Munawwar
- Ahmed Hassan
