= Aye Musht-e-Khaak =

Pakistani romantic drama serial

- Feroze Khan (Mustajab), Sana Javed (Dua)
- Genre: Romance drama
- Based on: A Handful of Dust
- Written by: Maha Malik
- Directed by: Aehsun Talish
- Starring: Feroze Khan; Sana Javed; Asad Siddiqui
- Theme music composer: Aisha Shehzad
- Country of origin: Pakistan
- Original language: Urdu
- No. of episodes: 36

Production
- Producers: Abdullah Kadwani; Asad Qureshi
- Running time: 38 minutes approx.
- Production company: 7th Sky Entertainment

Original release
- Network: Geo Entertainment
- Release: 13 December 2021 – 12 April 2022

Aye Musht-E-Khaak (Urdu: اے مُشتِ خاک, lit. 'Oh Fistful of Dust') is a Pakistani television series produced by Abdullah Kadwani and Asad Qureshi under banner 7th Sky Entertainment, directed by Aehsun Talish. The serial airs on Geo Entertainment. Maha Malik is the writer of this drama. It features Feroze Khan and Sana Javed in leading roles in their fourth project together with Asad Siddiqui, Iffat Rahim and Danial Afzal Khan in prominent roles.

== Plot ==
Dua is a sweet and innocent girl and she has many beliefs in Allah and her religion. Mustajab "Bobby" Ahmed is a narcissistic Atheist who thinks whoever he will marry will love him immediately. When Dua's parents, Sajjad and Nimra, go to pick up her twin brother Dayyan "Dayi" from the airport, Dua sees a white car come to her house and mistakes it for her family, and it is actually Mustajab and his mother Shakeela in the car for Mustajab and Dua's relationship. When Dua's parents come home with Dayyan, Mustajab and Dua get to talk in private as she shows him around her family's farm. But Dua doesn't say that much to Mustajab nor pays him any attention, which hurts his ego. But Shakeela eventually convinces Mustajab to agree to the marriage. Dayyan asks his mother to find out if Dua is okay with her and Mustajab's relationship. The next day, Shakeela gets a call from Nimra, saying that Dua has rejected Mustajab.

When Dua's family hosts a party, Shakeela asks Mustajab if he wants to come with her but he begs her to not talk to him about Dua or anything related to her again. But this doesn't stop him from going to the party himself. After dinner, Dua enters after Mustajab keeps staring at her creepily. Mustajab enters to talk to her about why she rejected him. Mustajab meets Dua in the room and Mustajab tells Dua that he has fallen in love with her. Despite this, Dua rejects Mustajab, which further hurts his ego. Mustajab tells Shakeela to go and talk to Dua's family, when Shakeela tells her family that Mustajab has decided to stay in Pakistan to stay with Dua because his business is all over the world. Mustajab takes Dua somewhere to eat and the two spend some time together.

Shakeela fakes a heart attack to get Mustajab and Dua married. After marriage, Mustajab wants to take Dua to America for their honeymoon but she says that she can't go since Ramadan is coming. When Dua finds out about the fake heart attack and Mustajab's real intentions, Mustajab's ex-girlfriend Shiza returns from America. Shiza says that Mustajab promised her that he will marry her. So Shiza says to Mustajab to either marry her or she will file a court case against him for a murder attempt on her. So Mustajab decides to go to America with Shiza for a few months and leaves Dua behind, unexplained. She tells Dayyan this, who is surprised.

Dayyan finds Mustajab and Shiza eating together but when Mustajab leaves, he talks with Shiza and she tells him the truth. Dayyan goes to Mustajab and confronts him but Dua comes in between and Dayyan leaves. After Mustajab leaves for America, Shakeela tells Dua the truth about Mustajab and Shiza. Dua tells Mustajab that she knows about Shiza, which doesn't upset him. After the moon comes marking the beginning of Ramadan, Dua finds Dayyan talking to Shiza and calls her a liar after Shiza says that Mustajab belongs to her. Dua starts to have suspicions on Mustajab's faith.

She tells Shakeela that she will leave Mustajab if he says that God isn't real. After the first of Ramadan, Dayyan tells his family that he has met a girl for marriage to distract Dua's mind from remembering Mustajab. The family then meet Tabeen, the girl Dayyan was talking about. Afterwards, Dua then tells Imam Sahib that whoever doesn't believe in God, belongs to no one. Dayyan then tells Dua that he knew about Shiza before. Then, Dua takes khula from Mustajab from court.

Dayyan decides to have Dua marry Tabeen's brother, Taqi. But, Mustajab decides to fake being a Muslim to get Dua back. Dua starts wondering if she should marry Taqi, but she still remembers Mustajab even after their khula. Dua goes to meet Mustajab but Tabeen informs Sajjad and Nimra of this and Sajjad goes with Dayyan to get Dua and Mustajab. While Dua and Mustajab plan to have their nikkah done privately, a thief shoots Dua. As she gives her last breath, Mustajab turns to Allah, but this time for forever. He realizes that he has been wrong since the beginning, and desperately turns to Allah for help. Mustajab prays that in order to save Dua's life, he will leave her forever. So now, he can't be with her since he has now dedicated his life to God.

Mustajab tells Dua the truth about his lies, leaving Dua heartbroken. He returns home to find his mother dead. At her funeral, he tells Dua that he is moving to America. Later, Dayyan tells Dua that Tabeen has given birth to son, Rayan Dayyan. A year later, after celebrating Rayan's first birthday, Dua finds a mosque and wonders that the mosque wasn't here before, so the Moulvi sahab tells her that the funding for this mosque comes from a man named Mustajab Ahmed. Dua then calls Mustajab, who has just returned from America and is now a Muslim, and tells him that she wants to meet him one last time before her marriage with Taqi.

They meet at the mosque, then they find out Mustajab will read Dua and Taqi's nikkah. Taqi intervenes and says that Mustajab deserves to be with Dua. Mustajab declines and leaves. Dayyan, Taqi and Imam Sahib follow him and convince him to be with Dua. Then, Imam Sahib reads Dua and Mustajab's nikkah, and they go happily to their home. At home, Dua finds Mustajab reading namaz and Mustajab asks her to pray with him. They both pray together, finally finding peace and happiness with each other.

== Cast ==
- Feroze Khan as Mustajab Ud Deen "Bobby" Ahmed
- Sana Javed as Dua
- Asad Siddiqui as Dayyan "Dayi", Dua's brother
- Shabbir Jan as Imam Sahib
- Shahood Alvi as Sajjad, Dua's father
- Iffat Rahim as Shakeela, Mustajab's mother
- Sadaf Aashan as Nimra, Dua's mother
- Ayesha Gul as Abida
- Namrah Shahid as Tabeen, Dayaan's wife
- Daniyal Afzal as Taqi, Dayaan's friend
- Ellie Zaid as Javeria
- Hira Umer as Rida
- Khalifa Sajeeruddin
- Shimza Zafar
- Nazia Khan

=== Guest appearances ===
- Nimra Khan as Shiza, Mustajab's ex
- Rashid Farooqui

== Production ==
Aehsun Talish has told in an interview that, the serial is one of his best drama. This drama was originally titled as Ibn-E-Hasratein.The project's BTS was published on Instagram by Feroze Khan on 25 September 2021. Asad Siddiqui will be in supporting cast. How a spoilt brat change himself for the sake of revenge is the core plot of the drama. Some sources said that it will be a Pakistani adoption of A Handful of Dust by Evelyn Waugh. Nimra Khan is also a part of this drama.

== Soundtrack ==
"Aye Musht-e-Khaak"

Single by Shani Arshad and Yashal Shahid
- Released: 17 December 2021
- Recorded: 2021
- Genre: Television score
- Length: 8:08
- Label: Geo
- Composer: Shani Arshad
- Lyricist: Sabir Zafar
- Producers: Abdullah Kadwani, Asad Qureshi

Music video
- Full audio on YouTube
