= Gumm (film) =

2019 Pakistani action thriller film

- Film poster
- Directed by: Ammar Lasani and Kanza Zia
- Written by: Ammar Lasani and Kanza Zia
- Produced by: Shakeel Anjum
- Starring: Sami Khan; Shameen Khan; Shamoon Abbasi; Anjum Habibi
- Production company: Starstruck Films
- Distributed by: Distribution Club
- Release date: 11 January 2019
- Running time: 110 minutes
- Country: Pakistan
- Language: Urdu

Gumm (lit. 'Lost') is a 2019 Pakistani action thriller film starring Sami Khan, Shameen Khan and Shamoon Abbasi. It was released on 11 January 2019 throughout Pakistan.

The film has been officially selected at 8 international film festivals, received at least 15 nominations and won 7 awards at these festivals.

== Plot ==
Asad (Sami Khan) wakes up in the middle of a jungle. He is injured with no memory, and a bag full of money. He hears on the radio that police are looking for a fugitive responsible for looting a bank. He is soon approached by Haider (Shamoon Abbasi), who tells Asad that the money belongs to him. Haider leaves with the bag full of money, whereas the injured Asad follows him.

Haider loses his way out in the jungle. He is also followed by hungry wolves. Meanwhile, Asad's memory keeps coming back in ‘flashbacks’ along the way as he follows Haider. Asad realizes that he looted the money to save the life of his ailing daughter and that the money never belonged to Haider.

As the story progresses, the stakes for both Haider and Asad get higher. Food, water and the harsh conditions of the jungle all contribute to make things difficult for both of them. They also encounter the hungry wolves in the wild.

Haider then encounters a police search team. He is followed by two members of the team, whom he kills instantly with a single strike of his knife. This is all witnessed by Asad hiding nearby.

Asad musters up his courage and follows Haider, only when Haider realizes that he is being followed he stabs Asad. Severely injured Asad is near-death when he visualizes his daughter dying. He dedicatedly goes after Haider one last time. The all-powerful, ruthless Haider and the injured, near-death Asad encounter for the final time in a brutal raw fight, where Haider is at last struck down with his own knife.

Haider lies in the middle of jungle and is eventually attacked by the hungry wild wolves, while Asad escapes the jungle to save his dying daughter.

== Cast ==
- Sami Khan as Asad
- Shameen Khan as Dua
- Shamoon Abbasi as Haider
- Anjum Habibi as Baba (Dua's Father)
- Aleeza Syed as Laiba (Asad's Daughter)

== Accolades ==
Gumm film got Official Selection at 8 international film festivals including AAB International Film Festival (India), CKF International Film Festival (UK), Creation International Film Festival (Canada), Festigious International Film Festival (Los Angeles, USA), London City International Film Festival (UK), Lake View International Film Festival (India), Eurasia International Film Festival (Moscow, Russia) and Madrid International Film Festival (Spain).

GUMM received more than 15 nominations and won seven awards among these international film festivals. It won Best Screenplay (Ammar Lasani & Kanza Zia) and Best Actor (Sami Khan) in a feature film at Madrid International Film Festival, Best Screenwriter (Ammar Lasani & Kanza Zia) and Best Editor (Kanza Zia & Ammar Lasani) in Lake View International Film Festival, Best Screenplay (Ammar Lasani & Kanza Zia) and Best Director (Kanza Zia & Ammar Lasani) in London City International Film Festival, and Best Actor (Sami Khan) at Creation International Film Festival.
