= Qaid (TV series) =

Pakistani television series

- Written by: Shagufta Bhatti
- Directed by: Mohsin Ali
- Starring: Zara Noor Abbas; Syed Jibran; Marina Khan
- Country of origin: Pakistan
- Original language: Urdu
- No. of episodes: 26

Production
- Producers: Wajahat Rauf; Shazia Wajahat
- Production locations: Karachi, Sindh
- Camera setup: Multi-camera setup
- Production company: Showcase Productions

Original release
- Network: Geo Entertainment
- Release: 6 December 2018 – 8 May 2019

Qaid (Urdu: قید, lit. 'Imprisonment') is a Pakistani television series aired on Geo Entertainment during 2018–19. It is produced by Wajahat Rauf and Shazia Wajahat under their banner Showcase Productions. It stars Zara Noor Abbas and Syed Jibran. It received low viewership ratings and according to The News International, Qaid did not work well for Abbas.

== Plot ==
Rehaam (Zara Noor Abbas and Aashir (Syed Jibran) studied together in college and have been good friends, soon they fall in love. Ashir’s mother has taken over his deceased father’s business and has been struggling to keep this business alive. In the midst of all this, she sends Ashir abroad to save the ongoing contracts. Before Ashir leaves he wants both families to meet and finalize his proposal for Rehaam. But unfortunately, Reham’s taya brings up the subject of her marriage with his son and her father and Taya end up in a big fight and Rehaam asks Ashir not to bring his family as her father is not well. Heartbroken but willing to help his mother Ashir leaves the country soon while Rehaam is venturing into home tuitions and ends up hired as Adaan’s teacher, who is Ashir’s younger brother. This fact remains hidden as she builds a rapport with both Adaan and Ashir’s mother. All this leads to Adaan having a crush on Rehaam which at first Rehaam did not notice but as soon as she finds Adaan’s behavior unusual she discourages it and leaves this job.

Rehaam will accept the proposal and right on her wedding day, Adaan does something that brings Rehaam’s life to a point of no return. Rehaam makes many sacrifices and suffers because of others' misdeeds. But will she finally achieve a happy life?

== Cast ==
- Zara Noor Abbas as Rehaam
- Syed Jibran Shah as Ashirr
- Waseem Abbas as Tufeeq; Ashirr's uncle
- Marina Khan as Sofia; Ashirr and Adan's mother
- Gul-e-Rana as Appa Bi, Ashirr's grandmother
- Nida Mumtaz as Shakra; Reham's mother
- Mariam Ansari as Farah; Tufeeq and Tasneem's daughter, Ashirr's cousin
- Farah Nadeem as Tasneem; Tufeeq's wife, Farah's mother
- Saifullah Sohail as Adan; Reham's student, Ashirr's brother, Sofia's younger son
- Abdullah Khan as Suboor
- Mehboob Sultan as Inspector
- Jibran Nusrat Jahan as Parveen
- Shehzad Malik as Rehmat
- Ahmer Hussain as Muneer
- Rameez Siddiqui as Ahmed
- Tariq Jameel as Barkat
