= Bharosa Pyar Tera =

2019 Pakistani romantic drama

- From left to right, Shameen, Aliya, Komal, Adeel, Faria and Babar.
- بھروسہ پیار تیرا
- Written by: Nuzhat Saman
- Directed by: Ali Akbar
- Starring: Adeel Chaudhry; Komal Aziz Khan; Babar Khan; Shameen Khan
- Country of origin: Pakistan
- Original language: Urdu
- No. of episodes: 72

Production
- Producers: Abdullah Kadwani; Asad Qureshi
- Camera setup: Multi-camera setup
- Production company: 7th Sky Entertainment

Original release
- Network: Geo Entertainment
- Release: 10 June – 20 September 2019

Bharosa Pyar Tera is a 2019 Pakistani romantic drama, produced by Abdullah Kadwani and Asad Qureshi under their banner 7th Sky Entertainment. It features Adeel Chaudhry and Komal Aziz Khan in the lead roles.

It aired daily from Monday to Friday from 9 to 10 pm local time. The series has touched record ratings and got major success at the 9:00 PM slot and millions of views on Geo's official YouTube channel. The popularity of this series resulted in reruns on the network soon after the last episode was aired.

== Synopsis ==
Bharosa Pyar Tera revolves around the families of two business partners, Shaukat Hayat (Mehmood Akhtar) and Ali Afzal. Their professional partnership takes an unexpected turn when Ali Afzal asks for Shaukat Hayat's only daughter Maryam's (Komal Aziz Khan) hand in marriage for his son Mikaal (Adeel Chaudhry). Mikaal had fallen in love with Maryam when he first saw her and wanted to marry her, though Maryam is reluctant about her marriage with Mikaal. Though they get intimate after their marriage and both fall madly in love with each other, Mikaal's cousin Laiba has been love with him ever since she was little and wanted to marry Mikaal even when she rejected him herself, after Mikaal's mother talked to Laiba's mom for their marriage. Laiba wanted Mikaal to propose to her, because she always thought he was in love with her, but after Mikaal rejected her, Laiba turned it around and made it look like she rejected him to be saved from embarrassment. While at Maryam's house; Adeel (Maryam's brother), his wife, Nida, was always jealous of Maryam since she was the family's favourite, was very innocent, and she was loved by everyone and had all the attention. Nida had also felt that Adeel gave more attention to Maryam than her. Together, Nida and Laiba deceitfully created plans and obstacles and made Maryam and Mikaal's married life difficult. Laiba and Nida made it look like Maryam is having an affair with her university friend Hassan and Mikaal starts losing trust on his wife.

A young girl's struggle to make her marriage work, will Maryam ever be able to gain trust of her husband and her in-laws or will Nida and Laiba continue to put her in a tough situation?

== Cast ==
- Adeel Chaudhry as Mikaal Afzaal Khan
- Komal Aziz Khan as Maryam Shoukat Hayat
- Babar Khan as Adeel Shoukat Hayat (Maryam's elder brother)
- Shameen Khan as Nida (Adeel's wife)
- Aliya Ali as laiba (Mikaal's cousin)
- Seemi Pasha as Ishrat (Mikaal's mother)
- Mehmood Akhtar as Shoukat Hayat (Adeel and Maryam's father)
- Humaira Zaheer as Maryam's mother
- Ayesha Khan as Raeesa Khanum (Shoukat Hayat's mother)
- Asim Mehmood as Hassan Akhtar
- Faraz Farooqui as Yasir
- Saife Hassan as Nasir (Laiba's father)
- Farah Nadir as Riffat (Laiba's mother and Ishrat's sister)
- Hashim Butt as Sayt Afzaal (Mikaal's father)
- Rizwan Ali Jaffri as Ubaid

== Soundtrack ==
Soundtrack album by Sahir Ali Bagga
- Released: 10 June 2019
- Genre: Television soundtrack
- Length: (1:11)
- Language: Urdu
- Label: Geo Entertainment

Music video
- "Bharosa Pyar Tera" OST on YouTube

The title song was sung by Sahir Ali Bagga. It was released on Geo Entertainment's YouTube channel.

== Reception ==
The serial emerged as the No.1 show across all Pakistani TV shows in weekly ratings for the period ending Sunday, 25 August 2019. The series created a record of the most-watched show in the 9 pm slot with a TRP of 17.0.
