= Zara Noor Abbas =

Pakistani actress (born 1991)

- زارا نور عباس
- Born: Zara Noor Abbas Gill; 13 March 1991 (age 35); Lahore, Punjab, Pakistan
- Education: Beaconhouse National University
- Occupations: Actress; model
- Years active: 2016–present
- Known for: Khamoshi (2017); Ehd-e-Wafa (2019); Parey Hut Love (2019); Phaans (2021)
- Spouse: Asad Siddiqui (m. 2017)
- Children: 1
- Mother: Asma Abbas
- Relatives: Ahmad Bashir (grandfather); Parveen Atif (grand-aunt); Bushra Ansari (aunt); Neelam Bashir (aunt); Sumbul Shahid (aunt)

Zara Noor Abbas Gill (Urdu: زارا نور عباس; born 13 March 1991), also known by her married name Zara Noor Abbas Siddiqui, is a Pakistani actress. She is known for her role as Arsala in Khamoshi (2017). She made her film debut with Chhalawa (2019) and later appeared in Parey Hut Luv.

== Early life ==
Abbas was born on 13 March 1991 in Lahore, Punjab. She is the daughter of actress Asma Abbas, niece of Bushra Ansari and Sumbul Shahid and maternal granddaughter of Ahmad Bashir. She is from a Punjabi background.

== Career ==
A graduate of Beaconhouse National University, Abbas has studied film design, dancing, theatre and filmmaking as an optional subject. After participating in various plays and dance competitions, she made her television debut in the Fahim Burney-directed 2016 series Dharkan, where she played the lead character of Areen opposite Adeel Chaudhary and Ghana Ali. The series ran for 18 episodes and aired weekly. The series received mixed reviews from critics. Shahbano Yousuf of Daily Times stated, "We see this drama as a great blend of our culture, its norms and value mixed with fantastical romance".

In 2017 she appeared in another project with the lead role of Arsala in the critically acclaimed series Khamoshi opposite Bilal Khan, Affan Waheed and Iqra Aziz. Upon release, Khamoshi has become one of the most watched drama series of 2017 and also nominated for Best Drama Serial category at annual Hum Awards. Her on-screen chemistry with Bilal Khan was praised. According to Buraq Shabbir of The News International, the series turned out to be a game changer for her. Ahmed Sarym of The Express Tribune praised her saying, "Within a short span of time, she’s not only been able to mark a niche but also impress both commercially and critically alike".

Abbas appeared in two series in 2018. She first starred alongside Shaz Khan in Amna Nawaz Khan's directorial Lamhay which tells the story of star-crossed lovers who are reincarnated. It is her third consecutive appearance in Momina Duraid's production after Dharkan and Khamoshi. The series did not do well in terms of ratings but her performance was praised. Her next series was Qaid. She starred opposite Syed Jibran and played the role of a Reham, a Home teacher who faces difficulties when one of her students is attracted to her. The series received average reviews.

Besides television Abbas was signed to her first film, Parey Hut Luv, directed by Asim Raza, also starring Maya Ali, Mahira Khan and Shehryar Munawar Siddiqui. The film was released in August 2019. In the same year, she was signed to Wajahat Rauf's comedy-drama Chhalawa opposite Mehwish Hayat and Azfar Rehman. She was paired with her husband Asad Siddiqui in the project. Both films performed well at the box-office. She will also be part of upcoming Wajahat Rauf's venture Karachi Se Lahore 3 which will be the third installment in Karachi Lahore (film series).

== Personal life ==
In 2017, she married fellow actor Asad Siddiqui, the nephew of Adnan Siddiqui. According to Abbas, they first met on the sets of Kis Ki Ayegi Baraat. The Nikah ceremony was held in Karachi, Pakistan. This was second marriage for both Zara and Asad. They later worked together in the feature film Chhalawa and drama Zebaish. They have one daughter.

== Off-screen work ==
Abbas frequently criticises body-shaming in the media industry. In June 2018, Abbas delivered a speech on "Power of a Single Decision" at Government College University in Lahore organized by TED Talk. She appeared for FnkAsia at Fashion Pakistan Week. In November 2019, Abbas joined hands with United Nations High Commissioner for Refugees to empower refugees in Pakistan and across the world.

== Filmography ==
=== Films ===
Key
†	Denotes films that have not yet been released

Year	Title	Role	Director	Notes	Ref(s)
2019	Chhalawa	Haya Rafaqat	Wajahat Rauf		
2019	Parey Hut Love	Shabbo	Asim Raza		
2026	Sheroes		Saqib Khan Badar Mehmood	Segment : Gear Up	
TBA	Aan †	TBA	Haseeb Hassan	Filming	

=== Television ===
Year	Title	Role	Network	Director	Ref(s)
2016	Dharkan	Areen	Hum TV	Fahim Burney	
2017	Khamoshi	Arsala	Hum TV	Ilyas Kashmiri	
2018	Lamhay	Aleena	Hum TV	Amna Nawaz Khan	
2018	Qaid	Rehaam	Geo Entertainment	Mohsin Ali	
2019	Ehd-e-Wafa	Rani	HUM TV	Saife Hassan	
2020	Zebaish	Noushaba (Noshi)	HUM TV	Iqbal Hussain	
2021	Phaans	Zeba	HUM TV	Ahmad Kamran	
2022	Badshah Begum	Jahan Ara	HUM TV	Khizer Idrees	
2023	Jhoom	Dr. Maryam Iqram	Geo Entertainment	Ali Faizan	
2024	Standup Girl	Zara Ahmed	Green Entertainment	Kashif Nisar	

=== Telefilms ===
Year	Title	Role	Network	Director
2020	Dil Tera Hogaya	Roma	Geo Entertainment	Aehsun Talish
2022	Love Life Ka Law	Maya	Geo Entertainment	Ali Faizan Anchan

=== Other appearances ===
Year	Title	Role	Director	Notes
2019	Deewar-e-Shab	Feroza Jahan	Iqbal Hussain	Episode 1-2

== Discography ==
Year	Title	Co-singer	Notes
2020	"Ye Watan Tumhara Hai"	Various	
2021	"Marjaavan"	Shani Haider	

== Awards and nominations ==
Year	Award	Category	Work	Result	Ref(s)
2020	1st Pakistan International Screen Awards	Best Supporting Actress	Chhalawa	Nominated	
2020	1st Pakistan International Screen Awards	Best Supporting Actress	Parey Hut Love	Won	
2022	8th Hum Awards	Best Actress - Viewer's choice	Phaans	Nominated	Nominated
2022	8th Hum Awards	Best Actress - Critic's choice	Phaans	Nominated	Nominated
