= Janita Asma =

Pakistani actress

Janita Asma is a Pakistani film and television actress and model. She is the daughter of Asma Khann, a model and actress.

== Career ==
She started her career as a child star in PTV drama Neend and afterwards did a PTV telefilm Bunty Ki Butterfly. Janita Asma made her big-screen debut in 2015 in the comedy film Wrong No., which earned her two nominations at the 2nd ARY Film Awards. She has worked in numerous other television projects, commercials and music videos.

== Selected Television ==
- Beti Jaisi
- Mujhay Sandal Kar Do
- Taaluq
- Andaaz-e-Sitam
- Hazaron Saal
- Mohabbat Haar Mohabbat Jeet
- Bunty Ki Butterfly
- Sapnon Ki Oat Mein

== Filmography ==
Year	Film	Role	Notes
2015	Wrong No.	Haya	debut film

== Awards and nominations ==
Year	Nominee / work	Award	Result
2016	Wrong No.	ARY Film Award for Best Star Debut Female	Nominated
2016	Wrong No.	ARY Film Award for Best Supporting Actress	Nominated
