= Main Chand Si =

Pakistani television series

- Genre: Romance, drama
- Written by: Memona Khurshid Ali
- Directed by: Babar Javed
- Starring: Saba Qamar; Sami Khan; Fahad Mustafa
- Country of origin: Pakistan
- Original language: Urdu
- No. of episodes: 23

Production
- Producers: Asif Raza Mir; Babar Javed
- Production location: Karachi

Original release
- Network: ARY Digital
- Release: 2011

Main Chand Si is a 2011 Pakistani romantic drama, that was aired on ARY Digital. The series starred Sami Khan, Saba Qamar and Fahad Mustafa, while Saba Hameed and Tipu Sharif were cast in supporting roles. It is based on a Memoona Khurshid novel of the same name serialised in Pakeeza Digest.

== Plot ==
Irsa is an independent and outspoken poor girl who dreams of marrying a rich boy. She marries Salar, who has a beard and is deeply religious. Irsa doesn't want any limitations placed on her by being married, hence she lies to Salar at every point. She meets her cousin Farhan at her sister's wedding and realizes that she loves him. She proceeds to lie to everyone that Salar divorced her and falsely swears on the Quran. She marries Farhan, but after several months, realises that Farhan has AIDS and lied in order to marry her. She contracts AIDS from Farhan and wants to apologize to Salar, but she learns that Salar is happily married and has moved on. In the end, she commits suicide by drinking poison.

== Cast ==
- Saba Qamar as Irsa
- Sami Khan as Salar
- Fahad Mustafa as Farhan
- Sana Askari as Fatima
- Qaiser Naqvi as Huma
- Faiza Gillani as Abida
- Rashid Farooqui as Basit
- Sadaf Aashan as Shehrish
- Farah Nadeem as Zahida
- Isha Noor as Hira
- Gul-e-Rana as Aliya
- Aamir Qureshi as Shehryar
- Noshaba Javed as Halima
- Naveed Raza as Fawad

== See also ==
- List of Pakistani dramas
