= Shameen Khan =

Pakistani actress (born 1995)

- Born: Shameen Khan; 3 December 1995 (age 30); Karachi, Sindh, Pakistan
- Education: National Academy of Performing Arts
- Occupations: Actress; Model
- Years active: 2013 – present

Shameen Khan is a Pakistani actress who has mainly appeared in Pakistani television serials and occasionally in films. In 2019, she made her film debut with Shamoon Abbasi's Gumm. She appeared in television series such as Gohar-e-Nayab, Hina Ki Khushboo, Dharkan, Bharosa Pyar Tera and Khuda Aur Muhabbat 3.

She believes that the industry should readjust its focus to see how best to benefit from the emergence of streaming platforms.

== Filmography ==
=== Television series ===
Year	Title	Role	Network
2013	Chand Bujh Gay	Shiza	ARY Digital
2013	Gohar-e-Nayab	Tania	A-Plus
2014	Ru Baru	Kiran	Hum TV
2014	Zindagi Tum Ho	Savera	Hum TV
2014	Daraar	Yousra	ARY Digital
2014	Pyar Hai Tu Mera	Anaya	Hum TV
2015	Muradan Mai	Nosheen	Urdu 1
2016	Dharkan	Shehrbano	Hum TV
2016	Seeta Bagri	Mala Rani	Hum TV
2016	Tum Kon Piya	Neha	Urdu 1
2016	Bahu Raaniyan	Sarah	Express Entertainment
2016	Hum Sab Ajeeb Se Hain	Rania	Aaj Entertainment
2016	Titli	Zara	Urdu 1
2017	Hina Ki Khushboo	Hina	Geo Entertainment
2017	Badnaam	Shumail	ARY Digital
2017	Amrit Aur Maya	Amrit	Express Entertainment
2017	Apnay Paraye	Aliya	Express Entertainment
2018	Ishq Bepanah	Maria	Express Entertainment
2019	Main Maaf Nahi Krun Gi	Sara	PTV
2019	Mera Rab Waris	Ayla	Geo Entertainment
2019	Dolly Darling	Madam KK	Geo TV
2019	Bharosa Pyar Tera	Nida	Geo Entertainment
2019	Haqeeqat	Dua	A-Plus
2019	Makafaat Season 1	Saira	Geo Entertainment
2020	Muqaddar	Maham	Geo Entertainment
2020	Makafaat Season 2	Alina	Geo Entertainment
2020	Dikhawa Season 1	Sheeba	Geo TV
2021	Dil Lattu Ho Gaya	Arzoo	SAB TV
2021	Makafaat Season 3	Aliya	Geo Entertainment
2021	Oye Motti Season 1	Rabia	Express Entertainment
2021	Dikhawa Season 2	Ramia	Geo Entertainment
2021	Khuda Aur Muhabbat 3	Sajal	Geo Entertainment
2022	Rasm-E-Ulfat	Zehna	PTV
2022	Hoor Pari Noor	Hoor	Express Entertainment
2022	Ant-Ul-Hayat	Shehzadi	Hum TV
2022	Nisa	Maheen	Geo Entertainment
2022	Ehsaas	Naila	SAB TV
2022	Mamlaat	Aiman	Geo Entertainment
2022	Dikhawa Season 3	Aliya	Geo Entertainment
2023	Oye Motti Season 2	Babi	Express Entertainment
2023	Sirat-e-Mustaqeem Season 3	Saba	ARY Digital
2023	Ahsaas	Nazi	Express Entertainment
2023	Meri Betiyaan	Arshi	Aan TV
2023	Ye Doriyan	Meena	Aur Life
2023	Mein Kahani Hun	Roohi	Express Entertainment
2023	Yehi to Pyar Hai	Zoya	A-Plus
2024	Sirat-e-Mustaqeem Season 4	Huma	ARY Digital
2024	Chaal	Saba	Geo Entertainment
2025	Laadli	Maryam	Hum TV
2026	Bas Aik Tum Hi	Sara	PTV
2026	Ain Se Ishq	Anya	Set Entertainment
2026	Muhabbat Ik Saza	Arham	Aur Life
2026	Khwaab Meray	Sumbul	Green Entertainment

=== Telefilm ===
Year	Title	Role
2014	Apne Hi Rang Mein	Zunaira
2018	Glass Tora Baara Aana	Urwa
2024	I am Sorry	Zoya
2025	Aitraaf-e-Muhabbat	Sadaf

=== Film ===
Year	Title	Role	Notes
2019	Gumm	Dua	
2023	Baba Jani	Nida	Short film
2023	Password	Maira	
2024	Azaad	Naila Talat Ali	

== Awards and nominations ==
Year	Award	Category	Result	Title	Ref.
2019	Madrid International Film Festival	Best Lead Actress in a Foreign Language Feature Film	Nominated	Gumm	
