= Sadaf Aashan =

Pakistani actress

- Born: Islamabad, Pakistan
- Education: University of Islamabad
- Occupations: Actress; Producer; Writer
- Years active: 2010 – present
- Children: 4

Sadaf Aashan is a Pakistani actress and producer. She is known for her roles in dramas Mohabbat Karna Mana Hai, Mere Bewafa, Main Chand Si, Hina Ki Khushboo, Aye Musht-e-Khaak and Pehchaan.

== Early life ==
She completed her education from the University of Islamabad and graduated with MA in economics.

== Career ==
Sadaf started writing scripts for a private channel and then she started producing dramas. Later, she made her debut as an actress in the drama Perfume Chowk. She was noted for her roles in the dramas Mohay Piya Rang Laga, Meenu Ka Susral, Main Chand Si, Kambakht Tanno, Shikwa Nahin Kissi Se and Mann Marr Jaye Na. She also appeared in dramas Hina Ki Khushboo, Charagar, Amrit Aur Maya, Ghamand, Phir Wajah Kya Hui, Soya Mera Naseeb and Mohabbat Karna Mana Hai. Since then she has appeared in the dramas Aye Musht-e-Khaak, Shehnai Kaun Bajaye Ga, Fitrat, Fasiq, Jannat Chordi Main Ny, Pehchaan, Inteqam and Heer Da Hero.

== Personal life ==
She is married and has four children.

== Filmography ==
=== Television ===
Year	Title	Role	Ref
2011	Main Chand Si	Sehrish	
2013	Meenu Ka Susral	Asheen	
2014	Bhabhi	Sajida	
2015	Malaika	Zakia	
2016	Kambakht Tanno	Shagufta	
2016	Mohay Piya Rang Laga	Tasneem	
2016	Mann Marr Jaye Na	Asma	
2017	Hina Ki Khushboo	Achi Phuphoo	
2017	Pujaran	Ruqaiya	
2017	Zindaan	Fahra	
2017	Shikwa Nahin Kissi Se	Hamna	
2017	Amrit Aur Maya	Raheela	
2018	Ghamand	Rashida	
2018	Hum Usi Kay Hain	Ambreen	
2018	Mohabbat Karna Mana Hai	Amna	
2018	Mere Bewafa	Nighat	
2019	Soya Mera Naseeb	Zareena	
2019	Phir Wajah Kya Hui	Afia	
2019	Bhai Bhai	Neelofar	
2020	Fitrat	Gulshan	
2020	Makafaat Season 2	Khalid's mother	
2021	Emaan	Rukhsana	
2021	Aye Musht-e-Khaak	Nirma	
2021	Jannat Chordi Main Ny	Rehana	
2021	Charagar	Saleha	
2021	Dikhawa Season 2	Sadia	
2021	Shehnai Kaun Bajaye Ga	Jameela	
2021	Fasiq	Sultana	
2022	Bepanah	Faiza	
2022	Pehchaan	Saba	
2022	Meri Hai Kiya Khata	Zenni	
2022	Inteqam	Abida	
2023	Samjhota	Sobia	
2023	Tere Aany Se	Kulsoom	
2023	Kitni Girhain Baqi Hain	Shagufta	
2023	101 Talaqain	Sajjad's mother	
2023	Ehsaan Faramosh	Sultana	
2023	Dooriyan	Asra	
2024	Ghaata	Nawab Bibi	
2024	Khudsar	Qamar-un-Nisa	
2024	Kaffara	Shahida	
2024	Ishq Beparwah	Raheela	
2025	Naqaab	Zehra	
2025	Laadli	Sabahat	
2025	Yeh Ishq Haey	Shagufta	

=== Telefilm ===
Year	Title	Role	Ref
2012	Meri Baat Suno	Nasreen	
2016	Mushtari	Tarannum	
2019	Kothi Say Nagan Chowrangi	Nazia	
2020	Haseena Tu Deewana Mein	Razia	
2021	Doly From Mianwali	Farida	
2021	Naya Zamana Ishq Purana	Nazia	
2021	Pyar Kay Lashkaray	Najma	
2022	Chand Si Dulhan	Mrs. Joji	
2023	Tamak Toiyan	Mahzar's mother	
2024	Jhoota Kahin Ka	Mrs. Chaudhary	
2024	Band Baja Aur Bajiya	Seema Haider	
2025	Jahan Nain Tara Rehti Hai	Tamanna	

=== Film ===
Year	Title	Role	Ref
2010	Dast Basta	Sara	
2020	Wardi Ya Dahshat Gardi	Malvi Sharbat	
2021	Pyar Aur Kirayedar	Rida's mother	
2021	Besharam	Shaista	
2021	Leaked Video	Meerab's mother	
2023	22 December	Wafa	
2024	Dhoka	Munna's mother	

== Awards and nominations ==
Year	Award	Category	Result	Title	Ref.
2014	4th Pakistan Media Awards	Best Television Film	Nominated	—N/a	
2020	APNA Karachi Awards	Best Actress	Nominated	—N/a	
2022	Conclave Pakistan Awards	Best Actress	Won	—N/a	
