= Farhan Ally Agha =

Pakistani film and television actor (born 1975)

- فرحان علی آغا
- Born: 12 May 1975 (age 51); Karachi, Sindh, Pakistan
- Other name: Farhan Ali Agha
- Occupations: Actor, model, voice actor
- Years active: 1995–present
- Height: 1.84 m (6 ft 0 in)
- Political party: PTI (2020-present)
- Spouse: Uzma Agha

Farhan Ally Agha (Urdu: فرحان علی آغا; also spelled: Farhan Ali Agha) is a Pakistani politician, film, television and voice actor who appears in Urdu television serials and films. He has dubbed the voice of Commander Safeguard in an animated series, Commander Safeguard and also dubbed the voice of Halit Ergenç in the drama serial Mera Sultan.

== Career ==
=== Bodybuilding ===
Before becoming a fashion model and later an actor, Farhan was a professional bodybuilder, who also won the title of Mr. Karachi in the late 1980s.

=== Actor ===
Farhan started his modeling career in the early 1990s. In 1995, he started working in TV drama serials and soon became a top actor in that era. He is currently working on different channels in many drama serials.

=== Politics ===
In December 2020, Farhan Ally Agha joined Pakistan Tehreek-e-Insaf.

== Filmography ==
=== Television series ===
Year	Title	Role
1995	Jiiya Jaye	
1995	Tum Se Kehna Tha	Saad
1999	Doosri Dunia	Shahab
2007	Jaal	
2009	Sotayli	
2009	Betiyan	
2010	Dil-e-Abad	Waqar
2010	Najiah	
2011	Choti Si Kahani	Rajal
2011	Khushi Ek Roag	
2011	Meray Qatil Meray Dildar	Maham's elder brother
2012	Mera Yaqeen	Ahmer
2012	Samjhauta Express	
2012	Meri Saheli Meri Humjoli	
2012	Mehar Bano aur Shah Bano	Hashim
2012	Phir Kab Milo Gay	
2014	Hum Thehrey Gunahgar	
2014	Sadqay Tumhare	Abdul Rehman
2015	Inteha	
2015	Muqaddas	Akbar
2015	Mere Humdum Mere Dost	Taufeeq Kamaal (Aimen's father)
2015	Mera Yahan Koi Nahi	
2015	Tere Baghair	Iftikhar
2016	Commander Safeguard	Dartoo
2016	Kitni Girhain Baaki Hain 2	Jameel/Baby's father
2017	Kaisi Yeh Paheli	
2017	Jithani	
2017	Yaqeen Ka Safar	Barrister Usman Ali Khan
2017	Alif Allah Aur Insaan	Nawazish
2017	Mohabbat Tumse Nafrat Hai	Mashood
2018	Suno Chanda	Jamshed Ali
2018	Tawaan	Wajahad
2019	Anaa	Azam
2019	Suno Chanda 2	Jamshed Ali
2019	Yeh Dil Mera	Ghauri
2019	Makafaat	
2019–20	Tera Yahan Koi Nahin	
2020	Umeed	
2020	Main Agar Chup Hoon	Alam
2021	Chupke Chupke	Kifayat Ali
2021	Sila-e-Mohabbat	Alizeh's father
2021	Bebasi	Sajid
2022	Hum Tum	Sultan Mansoor
2022	Meray Humnasheen	Dr. Sheheryar
2022	Dil Awaiz	Sikandar's father
2022	Nehar	Kabir
2022	Kala Doriya	Munir Ikhtiar
2022	Tere Bin	Waqas Ahmed
2023	Fitna	Ismail
2023	Fatima Feng	Usman
2024	Tauba	Siddiqui
2024	Yahya	Milli's father
2025	Dil Ik Shehr E Junoon	
2025	Pehli Mohabbat	
2025	Meri Uraan	

=== Films ===
Year	Film	Role	Director	Notes
2011	Good Morning Karachi	Fahad	Sabiha Sumar	
2015	Jawani Phir Nahi Ani	Sherry's father	Nadeem Beyg	Special appearance
2016	Maalik	Major Haider	Ashir Azeem	
2017	Whistle	DG	Ammad Azhar	
2018	Parwaaz Hai Junoon	Ali	Haseeb Hassan	Special appearance
2021	Khel Khel Mein			

== Awards and nominations ==
- Nominee: Best Actor Drama Serial in a Supporting Role in The 1st Indus Drama Awards 2005
- Nominee: Best Actor in a Leading Role in Lux Style Awards 2007
