= Farah Nadir =

Pakistani actress

- Occupation: Actress
- Years active: 1990s – present
- Children: Agha Ali Shah (Son); Sana Nadir (Daughter); Agha Muhammad Shah (Son)

Farah Nadir is a Pakistani actress. She is known for her roles in the dramas Raqs-e-Bismil, Hina Ki Khushboo, Malaal-e-Yaar, Bharosa Pyar Tera, Daldal, Ghisi Piti Mohabbat, and Naqab Zan.

== Career ==
She made her debut as an actress in the 1990s on PTV Channel. She first did modeling for commercials and advertisements. She soon got multiple offers from directors and did three dramas on PTV, which got popular.

== Personal life ==
Farah is married and has three children. Farah's daughter Sana Nadir is an actress.

== Filmography ==
=== Television series ===
Year	Title	Role	Network
2009	Nadaaniyaan	Begum	Geo Entertainment
2009	Aashti	Khala	Hum TV
2010	Daam	Mumani	ARY Digital
2011	Dil Manay Na	Afri	TV One
2011	Kitni Girhain Baaki Hain	Lubna	Hum TV
2012	Sure	Rukshana	PTV
2012	Saat Pardon Mein	Javeria	Geo TV
2013	Aasmanon Pay Likha	Asma	Geo TV
2013	Woh	Iram	Hum TV
2014	Aap ki Kaneez	Aruj	Hum TV
2014	Kissey Apna Kahein	Salman's mother	Hum TV
2014	Choti	Abida	Geo Entertainment
2014	Parvarish	Noor's stepmother	ARY Digital
2015	Judaai	Samina	Geo Entertainment
2015	Love In Gulshan-e-Bihar	Laila's Mother-in-law	TV One
2015	Shukrana	Batool's mother	Express Entertainment
2015	Teri Meri Jodi	Zulekha Bandukwala	Geo Entertainment
2016	Wafa	Wafa's aunt	Geo TV
2016	Bandhan	Amna	ARY Digital
2016	Kahan Tum Chalay Gye	Bilal's mother	Geo TV
2016	Maikay Ki Yaad Na Aaye	Begum Rameen	Geo TV
2016	Noor-e-Zindagi	Gulshan's mother	Geo Entertainment
2017	Bholi Bano	Bano's aunt	Geo Entertainment
2017	Faisla	Huma	ARY Digital
2017	Bharosa	Fazia	ARY Digital
2017	Tere Bina	Abia's mother	Geo Entertainment
2017	Kiran	Surayyia	Geo Entertainment
2017	Hina Ki Khushboo	Zainab	Geo Entertainment
2017	Daldal	Munni	Hum TV
2018	Mera Ghar Aur Ghardari	Fakhra's friend	Geo TV
2018	Bari Phupho	Kishwer	A-Plus
2018	Beti	Shahana's friend	ARY Digital
2018	Haara Dil	Zeba	A-Plus
2018	Babban Khala Ki Betiyann	Asad's stepmother	ARY Digital
2018	Ab Dekh Khuda Kya Karta Hai	Head Mistress friend of Maryam	Geo Entertainment
2018	Seep	Razia	TV One
2018	Kabhi Band Kabhi Baja	Mahnoor's mother	Express Entertainment
2019	Bharosa Pyar Tera	Riffath	Geo TV
2019	Naqab Zan	Raheel's mother	Hum TV
2019	Malaal-e-Yaar	Danish' mother	Hum TV
2019	Makafaat Season 1	Mother	Geo TV
2019	Haqeeqat	Zain's mother	A-Plus
2019	Tu Mera Junoon	Parveen	Geo TV
2019	Dolly Darling	Inspector Zareena	Geo Entertainment
2019	Mohabbat Na Kariyo	Nida's Mother-in-law	Geo TV
2019	Darr Khuda Say	Seema's mother	Geo Entertainment
2020	Tarap	Zunaira Aapa	Hum TV
2020	Sotan	Safiya	A-Plus
2020	Humraaz	Amna	Apna Channel
2020	Umeed	Shela's mother	Geo TV
2020	Dulhan	Elnaz's mother	Hum TV
2020	Raqs-e-Bismil	Saeeda	Hum TV
2020	Ghisi Piti Mohabbat	Bilal's mother	Geo Entertainment
2021	Phaans	Hashim's mother	Hum TV
2021	Dikhawa Season 2	Nargis	Geo Entertainment
2021	Oye Motti	Zubaida	Express Entertainment
2021	Makafaat Season 3	Amma	Geo Entertainment
2021	Badnaseeb	Shamsa	Hum TV
2022	Nisa	Bari	Geo TV
2022	Makafaat Season 4	Amir's mother	Geo Entertainment
2022	Bichoo	Riffat	Hum TV
2022	Kaisi Teri Khudgarzi	Erum	ARY Digital
2022	Ant Ul Hayat	Zarqa	Hum TV
2022	Guddu	Rasheeda	Geo TV
2022	Farq	Razia	Geo Entertainment
2022	Zindagi Aik Paheli	Samina	Geo TV
2022	Mere Damad	Talat	Hum TV
2023	Meri Betiyaan	Sanobar	Aan TV
2023	Dikhawa Season 4	Ambreen's mother	Geo Entertainment
2023	Ahsaas	Rashida	Express Entertainment
2023	Lyari Say Keamari	Shamo	PTV
2023	Hostel	Rasheeda	Aan TV
2023	Jindo	Khala	Green Entertainment
2023	101 Talaqain	Nasreen	Green Entertainment
2024	Faslay	Bano	Mun TV
2024	Meri Shahzadiyan	Gohar	BOL Entertainment
2024	Kaisi Hai Ye Ruswai	Zareen's mother	Express Entertainment
2024	Mohabbat Reza Reza	Kousar	Hum TV
2024	Aafat	Bua	Geo Entertainment
2024	Barat Nahi Aaii	Maryam	Set Entertainment
2024	Ishq Hua	Bua	Geo TV
2025	Soteli	Fouzia	Mun TV
2025	Sharakat	Romana	Green Entertainment
2025	Bandhan	Surraiya	Aan TV
2025	Sazawaar	Nabila	ARY Digital
2026	Khuda Gawah		Green Entertainment
2026	Khwaab Meray	Naima	Green Entertainment

=== Web series ===
Year	Title	Role	Network
2019	Shaadi Ka Ghar	Shalam's aunt	Teeli Channel
2019	Bakra Eid ka Ghar	Phuppo	Teeli
2020	Churails	Razia	Zindagi
2021	Just Married	Seema	Teeli Channel
2022	Double Hai	Durdana	
2022	Malika Encounter	Amma Kaneezan	Urduflix
2022	Zabardasti kay Rishtay	Farzana	Teeli

=== Telefilm ===
Year	Title	Role
2012	Ronaq Jahan Ka Nafsiyati Gharana	Nasreen
2013	Rahay Salamat Jodi	Imran's mother
2015	Nazar Kay Samnay	Chotu's mother
2015	Rock Do Shaadi	Jaltarang's mother
2017	Eid Sharaba	Dilbar's mother
2019	Eid Loadshedding Mubarak	Asfa
2021	Zoya Nay Haan Kardi	Ashir's mother

=== Film ===
Year	Title	Role
2010	Khas Kum	Rabi's mother
2011	Charcha-e-Harza	Bibi
2013	Anjuman	Anjum's mother
2020	Chamak	Rija
2021	Baap Ka Joota	Farhad's mother
2022	Mere Sapnon Ki Rani	Husnara's mother
