= Babar Khan =

Pakistani actor and model

- Born: Muhammad Babar Khan; 22 February 1987 (age 39); Pakistan
- Occupation: Actor
- Spouse(s): Sana Khan (m. 2013; died 2014) Bisma Khan (m. 2015)
- Children: Maryam Khan; Ibrahim Khan

Babar Khan is a Pakistani TV actor and model. He is best known for his role in Hum TV serial Ek Tamanna Lahasil Si which earned him a nomination for best supporting actor at the 1st Hum Awards.

Khan attended Bahria College in Karachi, Pakistan.

== Personal life ==
Khan married Pakistani TV drama actress Sana Khan in December 2013. On 7 March 2014, while traveling to Hyderabad, the couple was involved in a car accident in which Sana Khan died. Babar Khan was hospitalised with critical injuries. He suffered from depression after the demise of his wife.

Babar Khan remarried in January 2015 to his cousin, Bisma Khan. The couple has a son and a daughter together.

== Television ==
Year	Show	Role	Channel
2010	Shehre-Dil Key Darwazay		ARY Digital
2010	Amma Aur Gulnaz		Geo Entertainment
2010	Moum		PTV Home
2010	Band Khirkyon Kay Peechay		TVOne
2010	Diya Jalay	Hamza	ARY Digital
	Jhumoor		
	Tera Woh Pyaar		Hum Sitaray
2011-14	Kitni Girhain Baqi Hain		Hum TV
2012	Ek Tamanna Lahasil Si	Ehsan	Hum TV
2013	Rukhsar	Faizan	
2013-14	Khwab Tabeer	Iqbal	PTV Home
2014-15	Darbadar Tere Liye	Paras	Hum TV
2016	Lagaao	Farhan	Hum TV
2016	Thora Sa Asman		PTV Home
2017	Aashna	Ahsen	Play Entertainment
2017	Hina Ki Khushboo	Adil	Geo Entertainment
2017	Mohabbat Khawab Safar	Ahsan	Hum TV
2017	Mujhay Sandal Kar Do	Ahsan	Hum TV
2017	Jatan	Zahir	ARY Digital
2018	Aik Larki Aam Si	Farhan	Hum TV
2019	Bharosa Pyar Tera	Adeel	Geo Entertainment
2020	Ramzan transmission a plus TV new play	Inam	Geo Entertainment
