= Saij =

Coordinates: 23.220411°N 72.516827°E

Saij is a town located in the Kalol subdistrict of the Gandhinagar district in the state of Gujarat, India. It is located 13 km west of the district headquarters of Gandhinagar. The local language spoken there is Gujarati.

In 2011, the total population was 13,882 with 7,265 males and 6,617 females.
