= Sumbul Shahid =

Pakistani actress (1952–2021)

- Born: 1 January 1952; Karachi, Pakistan
- Died: 6 May 2021 (aged 66); Lahore, Pakistan
- Education: University of Karachi
- Occupations: Actress, Singer, Host
- Years active: 1990–2021
- Spouse: Shahid Nasir (husband)
- Children: Shiraz Nasir (son); Ahmed Nasir (son)
- Parent(s): Ahmad Bashir (father); Mehmooda Bashir (mother)
- Relatives: Bushra Ansari (sister); Neelam Bashir (sister); Asma Abbas (sister); Humayun Sheikh (brother); Waqas Abbas (nephew); Zara Noor Abbas (niece); Zara Abbas (niece); Nariman Ansari (niece); Meera Ansari (niece); Parveen Atif (aunt)

Sumbul Shahid (1 January 1952 – 6 May 2021) was a Pakistani actress, singer, and host. She was the daughter of Ahmad Bashir (Urdu: احمد بشیر; 24 March 1923 – 25 December 2004), a writer, journalist, intellectual, and film director from Pakistan She was known for her roles in the dramas Takkay Ki Ayegi Baraat, Pani Jaisa Piyar, Dekho Chaand Aaya, Ishqaaway, and Nand.

== Early life ==
Sumbul was born on 1 January 1954 in Karachi, Pakistan. She completed her studies at the University of Karachi.

== Career ==
She made her debut as an actress on PTV in the 1990s. She was noted for her roles in the dramas Aeteraaf, Parchaiyan, Happily Married, Yeh Shadi Nahi Ho Sakti, and Nazdeekiyan. She also appeared in the dramas Malika-e-Aliya, Takkay Ki Ayegi Baraat, Daagh, Faltu Larki, and Meri Behan, Meri Dewrani. Since then she appeared in the dramas Ishqaaway, Pani Jaisa Piyar, Dekho Chaand Aaya, Aik Aur Sitam Hai, and Nand.

== Personal life ==
Sumbul was married to Major (retd) Shahid Nasir and had two sons. Her father Ahmad Bashir was a writer and film director. Sumbul's son Shiraz Nasir died in a paragliding incident in Chitral in August 2019. Sumbul's younger sisters Bushra Ansari and Asma Abbas are actresses and her elder sister Neelam is a writer.

== Death ==
She was diagnosed with COVID-19 during the COVID-19 pandemic in Pakistan. She died on 6 May 2021, in Lahore.

== Filmography ==
=== Television ===
Year	Title	Role	Network
2009	Azar Ki Ayegi Baraat	Mushtaq's mother	Geo TV
2009	Baraat Series	Mushtaq's mother	Geo TV
2010	Khabarnaak	Herself	Geo TV
2010	Dolly ki Ayegi Baraat	Mushtaq's mother	Geo TV
2010	Golden Girls	Herself	PTV
2011	Takkay Ki Ayegi Baraat	Mushtaq's mother	Geo TV
2011	Pani Jaisa Piyar	Sasha's mother	Hum TV
2012	Meri Behan Meri Dewrani	Momina	ARY Digital
2012	Aeteraaf	Sabiya	ARY Digital
2012	Daagh	Noor	ARY Digital
2012	Annie Ki Ayegi Baraat	Mushtaq's mother	Geo Entertainment
2013	Parchaiyan	Saba	ARY Digital
2013	Happily Married	Sukrana	ARY Digital
2013	Yeh Shadi Nahi Ho Sakti	Amna	ARY Digital
2014	Malika-e-Aliya	Malika's khala	Geo Entertainment
2014	Pehchaan	Kukoo's mother	A-Plus Entertainment
2014	Nazdeekiyan	Urooj's mother	ARY Digital
2014	Ladoon Mein Pali	Bilquees's sister	Geo TV
2015	Family Band	Sakina	ARY Digital
2015	Ishqaaway	Amal's mother	Geo Entertainment
2015	Riffat Aapa Ki Bahuein	Fiza's mother	ARY Digital
2015	Mazaaq Raat	Herself	Dunya News
2016	Zindagi Aur Kitny Zakham	Shaista	TV One
2016	Dekho Chaand Aaya	Tayi Jaan	Geo Entertainment
2016	Dilli Walay Dularay Babu	Sultana's mother	ARY Digital
2016	Faltu Larki	Mushtari Bai	A-Plus
2018	Saaya	Ateeqa	Geo TV
2019	Aik Aur Sitam Hai	Khala Amma	A-Plus
2019	Mala Mir	Khala Ji	A-Plus
2019	GT Road	Nageena's mother	A-Plus
2020	Nand	Nasreen	ARY Digital
2021	Chupke Chupke	Khala	Hum TV

=== Telefilm ===
Year	Title	Role
2013	Zara Si Aurat	Uroosa's aunt
2021	Foreign Love Affair	Reshma
