= Bushra Ansari =

Pakistani actress (born 1956)

Bushra Ansari PP SI
- بشریٰ انصاری
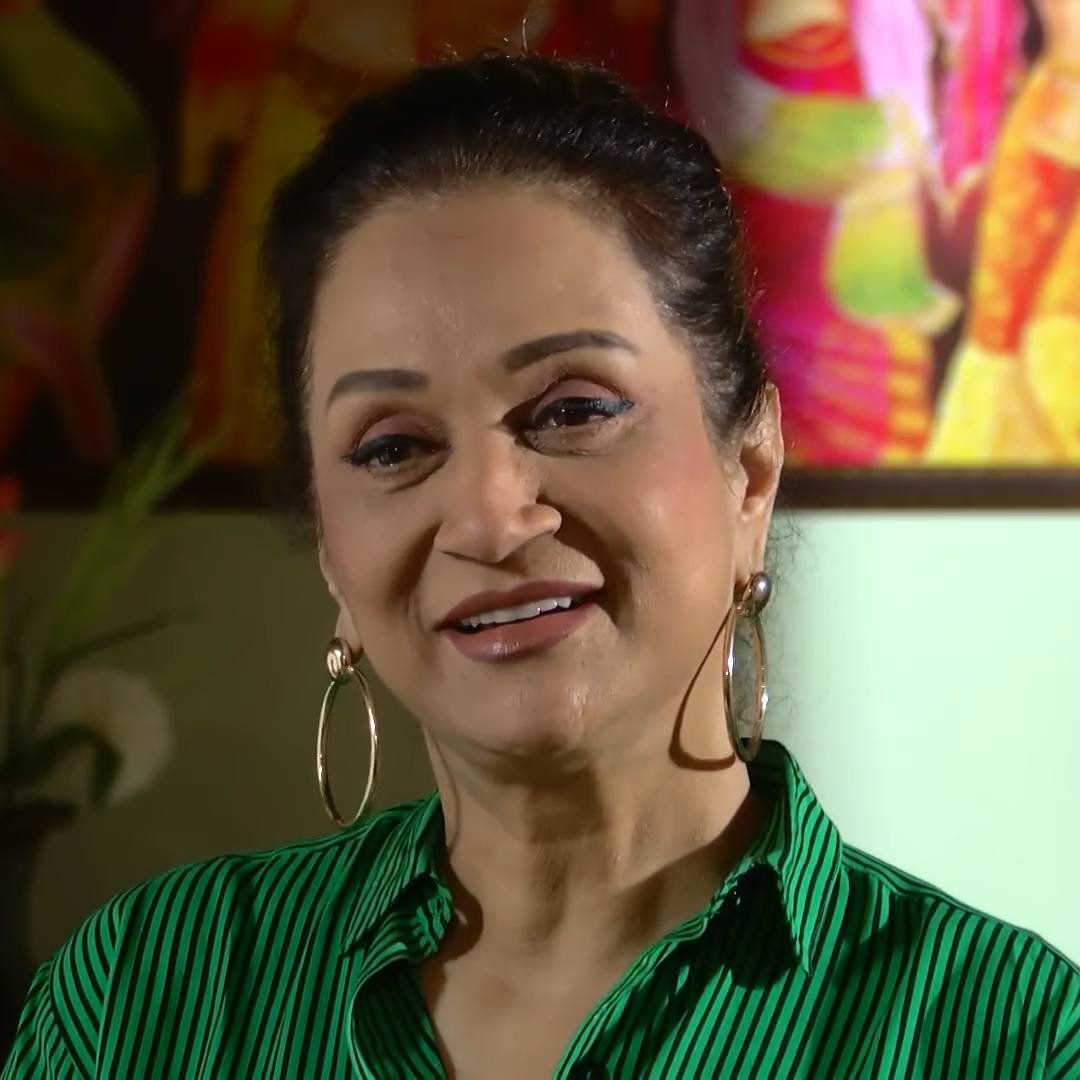
- Ansari in 2019
- Born: Bushra Bashir; 20 July 1956 (age 70); Karachi, Federal Capital Territory, Pakistan
- Education: Bachelor's in Fine Arts from Rawalpindi
- Occupations: Actress, singer, writer
- Years active: 1965–present
- Spouses: Iqbal Ansari (m. 1978; div. 2014); Iqbal Hussain (m. 2019; present)
- Relatives: Ahmad Bashir (father); Parveen Atif (aunt); Neelam Bashir (sister); Asma Abbas (sister); Sumbul Shahid (sister); Zara Noor Abbas (niece); Musarrat Nazir (aunt )
- Honours: Pride of Performance (1989) Sitara-i-Imtiaz (2021)

Bushra Ansari (Note: Punjabi, Urdu: بشریٰ انصاری) (Punjabi pronunciation: [bʊʃɾaː ənsaːɾiː]) is a Pakistani actress, comedian, singer, and playwright in Punjabi and Urdu cinema, who started her career as a child performer in the 1960s. Ansari has won numerous awards during her career, including the Presidential Pride of Performance Award in 1989 for her contributions to Pakistani television.

== Personal life ==
Ansari married producer and director Iqbal Ansari in 1978. The couple has 2 daughters, Meera Ansari and Nariman Ansari. Meera Ansari was born in Karachi and now resides in the United States. In 2019, after her divorce with her first husband, Bushra married Iqbal Hussain, who was previously married to Farah Sadia. Ansari is also a step-mother to her second husband's two sons.

== Career ==
Ansari's first dramatic acting role was in one of Iqbal Ansari's productions. She also appeared on PTV's most-watched shows, including Aangan Terha, Show Time, Show Sha, Rang Tarang, Emergency Ward, and the sketch comedy TV series Fifty Fifty.

In 2022, Ansari portrayed Maa Begum in the commercially hit romance-drama Tere Bin.

== Filmography ==
=== Films ===
Year	Film	Role	Notes
2015	Jawani Phir Nahi Ani	Zoya's Mother	
2016	Ho Mann Jahaan	Nadir's Mother	
2023	Allahyar and the 100 Flowers of God	Lizzy Appa	Voice
2025	Deemak		
2025	Welcome To Punjab		

=== Selected television ===
Year	Serial	Role	Network	Notes	Ref(s)
1978	Fifty Fifty		PTV		
1983	Saturday Night Live	Safia		Classic series	
1984	Aangan Terha	Jehan Ara Begum			
1985	Karawaan	Sajida	PTV		
1986	Raat Gaye		PTV		
1989	Neelay Hath	Jameela	PTV		
1992	Zara si Aurat	Qudsia	PTV	Telefilm	
1999	Neeli Dhoop	Nasira		Writer	
2003	Umrao Jan Ada	Khanam Jaan			
2004	Meharun Nisa	Zainab			
2006	Kuch Dil Ne Kaha	Shaista		Also a writer	
2006	Makan	Tayee G		Also a writer	
2006	Bushra Bushra	Host			
2007	Aurat Aur Char Devari	Seema		Episode "Mein Akeli Hun"	
2008	Amawas			Writer	
2009	Kis Ki Aayegi Baraat	Saima			
2009	Azar Ki Ayegi Baraat	Saima Chaudry			
2010	Dolly Ki Ayegi Baraat	Saima Chaudry		Won Lux Style Award for Best TV Actress	
2010	Dil Hai Chota Sa	–		Writer	
2011	Takkay Ki Ayegi Baraat	Saima Chaudry			
2011	Mera Naseeb	Sabah			
2012	Kitni Girhain Baaki Hain	Recurring			
2012	Bilqees Kaur	Bilqees Kaur			
2012	Annie Ki Ayegi Baraat	Saima Chaudry			
2012	Meray Dard Ko Jo Zuban Miley	Zakia		Also a writer	
2013	Kabhi Kabhi	Aarez's mother			
2013	Bushra Bara Boor	Bushra			
2013	1st Hum Awards	Presenter			
2013	Pakistan Idol (season 1)	Judge			
2014	Jab We Wed	Faris's Mother			
2015	Tum Mere Paas Raho	Tabish's Mother			
2015	Utho Geo Pakistan	Host			
2015	Khuda Dekh Raha Hai				
2015	Riffat Aapa Ki Bahuein	Riffat Aapa			
2016	Udaari	Sheedan		Hum Award for Most Impactful Character	
2016	Jhoot	Saleha			
2016	Pakeeza			Writer	
2016	Commander Safeguard's Mission: Clean Sweep: Jungle Main Mungle	Dirtee		Voice	
2016	Seeta Bagri	Nandani Das			
2017	Shaadi Mubarak Ho	Shahnaz			
2018	Bay Dardi	Shafay's Mother			
2018	Naulakha	Noor Jehan			
2019	Deewar-e-Shab	Sitara Jahan			
2020	Zebaish	Shahana		Writer also	
2021	Mrs. Chaudhry Ka Tarka	Saima Chaudhry		Ramadan special cooking show	
2021	Pardes	Mumtaz			
2023	Tere Bin	Begum Salma Shahnawaz Khan			
2024	Very Filmy		Hum TV	Ramadan Series	
2024	Kabhi Main Kabhi Tum	Shagufta Iftekhar Ahmed	ARY Digital		
2025	Mohabbat Youn Bhi Honi Thi		Hum TV	Telefilm	
2026	Dekh Zara Pyar Se		Hum TV	Ramadan Series	

== Awards and honors ==
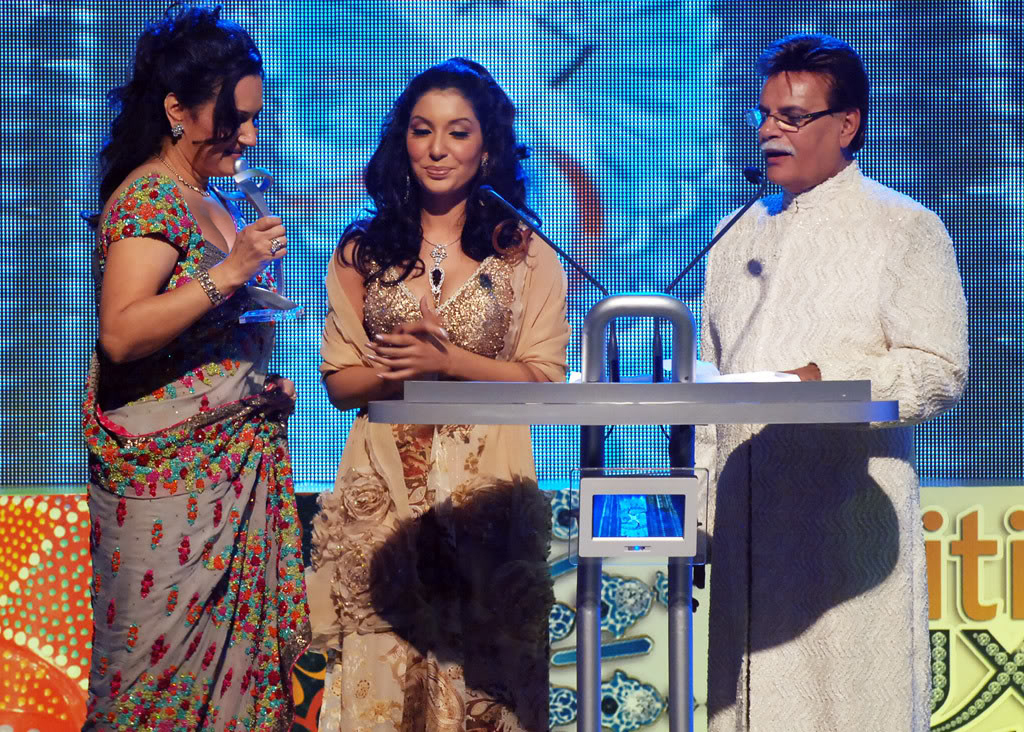
Bushra Ansari (left) at Lux Style Awards 2011

- Nigar Awards Best Actress Award for Aangan Terha in 1984.
- 6th PTV Awards Best Actress Award for Raat Gaye in 1986
- In 1989, she was awarded Pride of Performance for her contribution to Arts by the President of Pakistan.
- Iconic Women from Pakistan at Hum Women Leader Awards
- On 23 March 2021, she was awarded the Sitara-e-Imtiaz for her contribution to Arts during the annual civil awards conferred by the President of Pakistan.

=== Lux Style Awards ===
Ceremony	Category	Project	Result	Ref(s)
3rd Lux Style Awards	Best Television Actress	Umrao Jaan Ada	Nominated	
5th Lux Style Awards	Best Television Actress (Satellite)	Kuch Dil Ne Kaha	Won	
7th Lux Style Awards	Best Television Actress (Satellite)	Vanee	Won	
10th Lux Style Awards	Best Television Actress (Satellite)	Dolly Ki Ayegi Baraat	Won	
10th Lux Style Awards	Best Television Writer	Dolly Ki Ayegi Baraat	Nominated	
17th Lux Style Awards	Best Television Actress	Seeta Bagri	Nominated	
