= Bee Gul =

Pakistani screenwriter and director

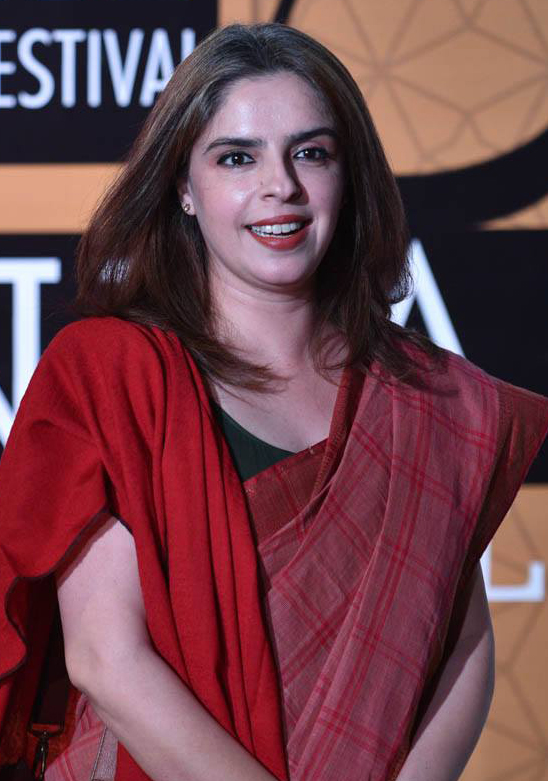
- Gul at an event for Bunvat in 2018
- Born: Bee Gul; Lahore, Punjab, Pakistan
- Education: Kinnaird College for Women University
- Occupations: Screenwriter and director
- Years active: 2010-present
- Notable work: Talkhiyaan, Pehchaan, Kaun Qamar Ara, Dar Si Jaati Hai Sila and Raqeeb Se

Bee Gul (Urdu: بی گل) is a Pakistani screenwriter and director. She wrote films and TV plays like Talkhiyaan, Pehchaan, Kaun Qamar Ara, Firdous ki Dozakh, most notably Dar Si Jaati Hai Sila and Raqeeb Se for Hum TV.

Her work is often described as artsy. Additionally, Bee Gul serves as a visiting faculty member at the National College of Arts (NCA) Lahore, where she teaches advanced scriptwriting, film analysis, and production design.

== Career ==
Gul's writing debut was marked by the television film, Kaun Qamar Aara, which premiered at Hum TV's 2nd Telefilms Festival. Set against the backdrop of British India, this one-hour telefilm weaves the poignant tale of a husband and wife, played by Shakeel and Faiza Hassan. The film received nominations in every category at the 2nd Hum Telefilm Awards, with Gul taking home the Best Telefilm Writer Award.

Gul then brought Arundhati Roy's bestselling novel, The God of Small Things, to life as the TV series Talkhiyaan. The show's opening theme was inspired by Sahir Ludhianvi's poem, while the title itself was a nod to Ludhianvi's book of the same name. An Express Tribune based reviewer stated it as "an excellent adaptation barring a few false notes" and further wrote, "Gul managed to rework the book The God of Small Things in a really poetic way". Gul also received a Best Television Writer nomination at the 4th Pakistan Media Awards.

Gul's second series, Pehchaan, which aired on A-Plus TV in 2014, remains her personal favorite work. The series tells the unconventional story of a man who marries his mistress, after helping her escape an abusive marriage, in addition to his existing wife. Through Pehchaan, Gul feels that she empowered a simple housewife.

Her next project was Zid which was about a woman who resists forced marriage and societal pressure. Gul cited producer pressure as undermining the series creative potential, leading to critical failure.

For her writing of Dar Si Jaati Hai Sila, Gul won the Best Television Writer award at the 18th Lux Style Awards. The series is about the disturbing truth about sexual predators who hide in plain sight, in normal households. During its broadcast, Pakistan Electronic Media Regulatory Authority (PEMRA) issued a notice to the series for its portrayal of assault, deeming it "an uncomfortable watch" to which Gul responded, "such projects never become a comfortable watch".

Gul then wrote the romance Raqeeb Se, a tale of romance whose consequences are stretched around one's entire life. Despite the widespread critical acclaim of the script, the DAWN Images listed the series among the "Toxic love stories" and criticised its portrayal of love and glamorizing unhealthy relationships. Nevertheless, Gul was nominated at the 21st Lux Style Awards as a Best Television Writer.

In 2022, Gul transitioned to the big screen with the release of Intezaar, reuniting with director Sakina Samo after Kaun Qamar Ara. The film explores themes of isolation, separation, and mortality through the lens of a fractured family, earning positive reviews from critics.

Gul's next project was Working Women, broadcast on Green Entertainment in 2023, a story of six women who trying to make it big in a male-dominated society. Gul described the story of the series as "open like Lahore’s roads and Lahoris’ hearts.".

In 2024, Gul's short film Jamun Ka Darakht (The Java Plum Tree) won numerous global accolades, including Best Social Justice Short Film at the World Film Festival in Cannes, Best Human Rights Short Film Prize at the Vancouver International Film Festival, and Outstanding Achievement for Indie Short at the LA Shorts Fest, further solidifying her international acclaim.

The Pink Shirt, an eight-episode drama series written by Bee Gul and directed by Kashif Nisar, premiered at the SXSW Sydney Film Festival in 2023. The series stars Sajal Aly and Wahaj Ali and explores complex modern relationships and emotional transformation. It was the only South Asian streaming series selected for the festival’s first edition outside Austin, Texas.

Aik Aur Pakeezah, 2026, a joint Geo TV and Kashf Foundation venture was written by Bee Gul.

== Filmography ==
=== As screenwriter ===
Key
†	Denotes films that have not been released yet

Year	Title	Director(s)	Notes	Ref.
2016	Laloolal.com	Khalid Ahmed	streamed on ZEE5	
2022	Intezaar	Sakina Samo		
2024	Jamun Ka Darakht	Rafay Rashdi	Short film	

== Television ==
Year	Title	Notes
2010	Kaun Qamar Ara	Telefilm
2012-2013	Talkhiyaan	Adaptation on Arundhati Roy's The God of Small Things
2012	Firdous ki Dozakh	Telefilm
2013-2014	Ain	
2013	Chup ka Shor	Telefilm
2013-2014	Kitni Girhain Baaki Hain	
2014	Pehchaan	
2014-2015	Zid	
2017	Janaat	
2017-2018	Dar Si Jaati Hai Sila	
2018	Dilara	Adaptation of Munshi Premchand's Nirmala
2021	Raqeeb Se	
2023	Working Women	
2024	Standup Girl	Script supervisor
2024	Hum Dono	
2024	Teen Tera	streamed on ZEE5
2026	Aik Aur Pakeezah	
TBA	The Pink Shirt †	on Begin, ZEE5

== Plays ==
Title	Description	Premiere	Venue	Ref.
Badshahat Ka Khatima	based on Saadat Hassan Manto's eponymous short story, Directed by Khalid Ahmed	2013	National Academy of Performing Arts	
Bedroom Conversations	Directed by Khalid Ahmed	2019	National Academy of Performing Arts	
Kal Agar Main Marjaoun	Directed by Khalid Ahmed	2021	Vasl Productions	
Badal Gayi Ho	Directed by Khalid Ahmed	2024	National Academy of Performing Arts	
The Prologue	Directed by Khalid Ahmed	2024	National Academy of Performing Arts	
Pandra Minute Aur	Directed by Fawad Khan	2024	National Academy of Performing Arts	

== Accolades ==
Ceremony	Category	Project	Result	Ref.
4th Pakistan Media Awards	Best Television Writer	Talkhiyaan	Nominated	
18th Lux Style Awards	Best Television Writer	Dar Si Jaati Hai Sila	Won	
21st Lux Style Awards	Best Television Writer	Raqeeb Se	Nominated	

== See also ==
- List of Pakistani writers
- List of Urdu language writers
