= Shamim Hilaly =

Pakistani actress

- شمیم ہلالی
- Born: Shamim Ahmed; 7 August 1947 (age 79); Bombay, British India (now Mumbai, India)
- Other name: Shamim Hilali
- Education: Kinnaird College for Women
- Occupations: Actress; Singer; Host; Teacher
- Years active: 1964 - present
- Spouse: Zafar Hilaly (m. 1968)
- Children: 2
- Relatives: Agha Hilaly (father-in-law)
- Family: Tyabji family (through husband)

Shamim Hilaly (née Ahmed, born 1947) is a Pakistani actress who has acted in both films and television dramas. She is most famous for acting in PTV dramas including Barzakh, Mere Dard Ko Jo Zuban Mile, Parosi and Waqt Ko Tham Lo. She is noted for her performance in Maigh Malhar during the 1990s. She has also acted in Pakistan's only English language movie, Beyond the Last Mountain (1976).

== Early life ==
Shamim was born in Bombay, British India. After the partition of India, her family moved to Pakistan and settled in Lahore. She was interested in acting from a young age, and did theatre and dramatic plays at the Convent of Jesus and Mary. Later, she attended Kinnaird College for Women, and there, she practiced choral speaking. Later, she went to Government College, and she used to do dramatic plays. Later, she graduated from Government College with a master's degree in English literature.

After PTV was established in 1964, and Aslam Azhar, Chairman and MD of PTV, was looking for actors and actresses, so he saw Shamim at a college play, and he encouraged her to act in dramas then she agreed, and she also hosted a show called University Magazine Show.

== Career ==
She worked in Amjad Islam Amjad's drama Barzakh along with Rahat Kazmi, in which she portrayed the role of Rashida. It aired on PTV. In 1976, she worked in Pakistan's first English film, Beyond the Last Mountain, in which she portrayed the role of a single parent bringing up a small child. lt was directed and written by Javed Jabbar; later, it was shown at the 6th International Film Festival of India in Delhi. Later in 1982, she appeared in the drama Alif Noon, and she portrayed the role of a college student who goes to a bicycle shop to have a punctured tire repaired.

In the 1980s, Shamim and her husband moved to Yemen as he was posted there for some work. There she taught English at various colleges and universities. Later she returned to Pakistan with her husband, and she resumed her acting career, but she also taught English at colleges and universities.

In 1990, she worked in the drama Parosi, which was written by Haseena Moin and directed by Raana Sheikh. Some of the shooting took place in Islamabad and Murree. It aired on NTM. She portrayed the roles of Mrs. Asif, the elder sister of Jahan Ara, portrayed by Khalida Riyasat, and Roshan Ara, portrayed by Marina Khan.

In 1995, she appeared in the drama Maigh Malhar on NTM. It was written by Asghar Nadeem Syed. The story was based on The Time of Separation of Eastern Pakistan (Bangladesh) and Western Pakistan, in which she played the role of Maleeha Khan, who is the second wife of a man who had left the love of his life behind in Bangladesh. It was a negative role, but her role received positive reviews.

In 2010, she worked in the drama Uraan, which aired on Geo TV, and she portrayed the role of a psychotic mother in Uraan who wants to marry her mentally unstable son. In 2011, she appeared in the drama Maat, which was based on an Urdu novel of the same name by Umera Ahmad, and she portrayed the role of Faisal's mother, who is a middle-income widow and sits with her son on a motorcycle. It aired on Hum TV. The following year, in 2012, she appeared in the drama Talkhiyaan. It was based on the novel The God of Small Things, written by Indian author Arundhati Roy, and she portrayed the role of Mother, a difficult, unsympathetic woman to her daughter, who has left her husband and comes to stay with her with her children, and she favours her son more than her daughter.

Since then she appeared in dramas such as Neeli Zinda Hai, Meri Shehzadi, Wehem, Prem Gali, Hum Kahan Ke Sachay Thay and Jannat Se Aagay.

== Personal life ==
She is married to the former ambassador turned political commentator, Zafar Hilaly and they have two children.

== Filmography ==
=== Television ===
Year	Title	Role	Network
1972	Barzakh	Rashida	PTV
1982	Alif Noon	College Student	PTV
1990	Parosi	Mrs. Asif	NTM
1991	Waqt Ko Tham Lo	Irene	PTV
1992	Sofia	Suraiya	PTV
1993	Mere Dard Ko Jo Zuban Mile	Maira	PTV
1995	Maigh Malhar	Maleeha Khan	NTM
1997	Shahpar	Mohsin's mother	PTV
2007	Manay Na Ye Dil	Roshni's mother	Hum TV
2008	Meri Adhoori Mohabbat	Samreen	Geo TV
2008	DiL ki Madham Boliyan	Maya	TV One
2009	Saiqa	Daadi Huzoor	Hum TV
2009	Noorpur Ki Rani	Salar's mother	Hum TV
2009	Malaal	Afia	Hum TV
2010	Haal-e-Dil	Seerat's mother	ARY Digital
2010	Ishq Gumshuda	Ali's mother	Hum TV
2010	Shehr e Dil Ke Darwazay	Afsheen's mother	ARY Digital
2010	Uraan	Sarah Saeed	Geo TV
2010	Morr Uss Gali Ka	Afreen	ARY Digital
2010	Zeenat Bint-e-Sakina Hazir Ho	Amma	Geo TV
2010	Dil Hai Chota Sa	Amaar's mother	Geo TV
2011	Maat	Faisal's mother	Hum TV
2011	Meri Behan Maya	Khala	Geo Entertainment
2011	Band Khirkiyon Kay Peechay Season 2	Zeni Mahta	TV One
2011	Meray Khwab Raiza Raiza	Zainab's mother	Hum TV
2011	Ek Nazar Meri Taraf	Faris's mother	Geo TV
2011	Jal Pari	Ammi Bi	Geo TV
2012	Main Jali	Taimoor's mother	Geo TV
2012	Band Gali	Afroz Begum	PTV
2012	Mere Huzoor	Saeeda	Express Entertainment
2012	Nadamat	Tania's aunt	Geo TV
2012	Coke Kahani	Nusrat	Hum TV
2012	Talkhiyaan	Mama	Express Entertainment
2013	Shak	Tai Jan	ARY Digital
2013	Dil-e-Muztar	Sila's aunt	Hum TV
2013	Silvatein	Bilal's mother	ARY Digital
2013	Shukk	Sania's aunt	ARY Digital
2014	Mere Humdum Mere Dost	Bibi	Urdu 1
2014	Kaun Sitaray Chu Sakta Hai	Khursheed	TV One
2014	Soteli	Ruqaiya	ARY Digital
2014	Shanakht	Shireen	Hum TV
2014	Meri Anaya	Suliman's mother	Express Entertainment
2015	Aitraz	Arsalan's mother	ARY Digital
2015	Dil Ishq	Mansoor's mother	Geo TV
2015	Meray Dard Ki Tujhe Kya Khabar	Saad's mother	ARY Digital
2015	Aye Zindagi	Sultana	Hum TV
2015	Unsuni	Farah's mother	PTV
2015	Ek Sitam Aur Sahi	Saeeda	Express Entertainment
2015	Aap Ki Kaneez	Amma Jee	Geo Entertainment
2015	Bheegi Palkein	Meher Bano's mother	A-Plus
2015	Goya	Mrs. Imtiaz	ARY Digital
2015	Dil Tere Naam	Safia	Urdu 1
2016	Kitni Girhain Baaki Hain: Part 2	Khala Bi	Hum TV
2016	Tum Milay	Fakhra's mother	ARY Digital
2016	Lagaao	Chachi Bi	Hum TV
2016	Sila	Sajjad's mother	Hum TV
2016	Iss Khamoshi Ka Matlab	Yasmeen's aunt	Geo TV
2016	Ab Kar Meri Rafugari	Rabia Sultan	ARY Digital
2017	Phir Wohi Mohabbat	Dadi	Hum TV
2017	Piyari Bittu	Mehboob's mother	Express Entertainment
2017	Teri Raza	Suhana's grandmother	ARY Digital
2017	Qurban	Amma Ji	ARY Digital
2017	Dil-e-Jaanam	Rakshy	Hum TV
2018	Tum Se Hi Talluq Hai	Saadan's mother	Geo Entertainment
2018	Zun Mureed	Amma	Hum TV
2019	Dil-e-Gumshuda	Khalida	Geo Entertainment
2019	Bin Badal Barsat	Daadi	Express Entertainment
2019	Yateem	Hina's grandmother	A-Plus
2019	Meray Paas Tum Ho	Roomi's school principal	ARY Digital
2019	Dil Kiya Karay	Sohana Begum	Geo Entertainment
2020	Prem Gali	Rahat	ARY Digital
2021	Hum Kahan Ke Sachay Thay	Nani	Hum TV
2021	Neeli Zinda Hai	Pervaiz's mother	ARY Digital
2022	Wehem	Amma Bi	Hum TV
2022	Angna	Dadi	ARY Digital
2022	Meri Shehzadi	Safia	Hum TV
2023	Sirat-e-Mustaqeem Season 3	Waqar's mother	ARY Digital
2023	Mein Kahani Hun	Asif's mother	Express Entertainment
2023	Kitni Girhain Baaki Hain	Zarina	Hum TV
2023	Tere Aany Se	Mahir's grandmother	Geo TV
2023	Shanaas	Jalal's mother	Green Entertainment
2023	Jannat Se Aagay	Jannat's mother	Geo Entertainment
2024	Contractors	Nigar	Geo Entertainment
2025	Parwarish	Suraiyya	ARY Digital
2025	Humraaz	Bi Amma	Geo TV
2025	Haya	Darakhshan Begum	Geo Entertainment
2025	Meri Zindagi Hai Tu	Sohail's mother	ARY Digital
2025	Pehli Barish	Zehra	Geo Entertainment

=== Telefilm ===
Year	Title	Role	Network
2013	Dil Mera Dhadkan Teri	Amma	Geo TV
2015	Nok Jhonk	Urooj's grandmother	Geo TV
2015	Lucknow Wale Lateefullah	Zulaiqa	Hum TV
2018	Dino Ki Dulhaniya	Dino's grandmother	Geo TV
2024	Ijazat	Emi	ARY Digital
2025	U Turn Wala Love	Jamal's mother	ARY Digital
2026	Dadi Ki Shadi	Babar's mother	ARY Digital

=== Web series ===
Year	Title	Role	Notes
2020	Churails	Jahanara	Episode 7 - 10

=== Film ===
Year	Title	Role	Notes
1976	Beyond the Last Mountain	Shamim	
2016	Dobara Phir Se	Maa Ji	
2017	Chalay Thay Saath	Aqsa	
2018	Motorcycle Girl	Zenith's grandmother	
2018	Altered Skin	Imtiaz's wife	Short film
2018	Pinky Memsaab	Jahanara	
2019	Laal Kabootar	Aliya's mother	
2024	The Queen of My Dreams	Woman on Plane	

=== Host ===
Year	Title	Role	Network
1964	University Magazine Show	Herself	PTV

=== Other appearance ===
Year	Title	Role	Network
2018	Hamare Mehman	Herself	ARY News
2021	Zindagi With Sajid Hasan	Herself	ARY Zindagi

== Awards and nominations ==
Year	Award	Category	Result	Title	Ref.
2013	4th Pakistan Media Awards	Best Supporting Actress	Nominated	Talkhiyaan	
2021	ARY People's Choice Awards	Favorite Actress in a role of Mother	Nominated	Prem Gali	
