= Intezaar =

Intezaar may refer to:

- Intezaar (1956 film), a Pakistani musical romance film
- Intezaar (TV series), a 2016 Pakistani Urdu-language family drama series
- Intezaar (2022 film), a Pakistani drama film
