= Kitni Girhain Baaki Hain: Part 2 =

- Season 2
- Kitni Girhain Baaki Hain title screen
- No. of episodes: 37

Release
- Original network: Hum Network Limited
- Original release: 30 October 2016 – 20 August 2017

Season chronology
- ← Previous; Kitni Girhain Baaki Hain Next → Kitni Girhain Baaki Hain 3

Kitni Girhain Baaki Hain: Part 2 (Urdu: کِتنی گِرہيں بَاقی ہيں, lit: How many more knots yet to untie?) is a Pakistani anthology thriller drama television series, that aired on Hum TV. Created by Angeline Malik, the series was a sequel to the anthology series Kitni Girhain Baaki Hain (2011–2014). It premiered on 30 October 2016 with a different cast and story in each episode.

== Cast ==
- Hassan Ahmed as Kamran (Ep:1)
- Hira Mani as Saba (Ep:1)/Sana (Ep:26)
- Ayesha Omer as Aliya (Ep:2)
- Ushna Shah as Rozi (Ep:1)/Sarah (Ep:25)
- Anwar Iqbal as Fariya's father (Ep:5)
- Falaq Naz as Saba's friend (Ep:1)
- Aiman Khan as Fariya (Ep:5)/Bushra (Ep:16)
- Alyy Khan as Ayaz's step-father (Ep:2)/Asif (Ep:5)/Parvez (Ep:11)
- Zahid Ahmed as Hassaam Khan/Rehman (filmi name) (Ep:4)
- Muhammad Asif (Ep:3)
- Muhammad Saleem as Moulvi (Ep:1)
- Hisham Soomro as Doctor (Ep:10)
- Tasleem Ansari as Parvez's mother (Ep:10)
- Kanwal Nazar as Shazia (Ep:10)
- Younus Khan as Hassaam's friend
- Mariyam as Sehrish/Zoya (filmi name) (Ep:4)
- Uroosa Siddiqui as Nargis (Ep:3)/Laila (Ep:23)
- Farah Shah as Romaisa's mother (Ep:4)/Munney Mian's mother (Ep:9)/Mansoor's wife (Ep:14)
- Noor Khan as Romaisa (Ep:4)
- Bilal Abbas as Munney Mian (Ep:9)
- Nadia Afgan as Kharafa (Ep:9)/Aasiya (Ep:17)
- Gul-e-Rana as Fariya's mother (Ep:5)
- Hanif Khan as Tasawur (Ep:3)
- Samdhan Khan as Nargis' fiancée (Ep:3)
- Zain Kanwal as Nargis' fiancée (Ep:3)
- Nabeel Kanwal as Nargis' fiancée (Ep:3)
- Maria Wasti as Nargis' sister-in-law (Ep:3/Mariam (Ep:24))
- Fazal Baldistani as Nargis' fiancée (Ep:3)
- Hammad Farooqui as Ayaz (Ep:2)/Arslan (Ep:28)
- Salma Qadir as Daisy's aunt (Ep:1)
- Shamim Hilaly as Khala Bi (Ep:6)
- Kaif Ghaznavi as Jamra'at (Ep:6)/Naina (Ep:30)
- Imran Ashraf as Ramzan (Ep:6)/Mustaqeem (Ep:17)/Kashif (Ep:26)
- Hyder Chandio as Aamir (Ep:6)
- Ikram Abbasi as Doctor (Ep:6)
- Hina Dilpazeer as Shamma/Barrister Maasi (Ep:8)
- Asif Raza Mir as Hameed Azfar (Ep:8)/Atif (Ep:30)
- Shahida Murtaza as old mistress of Shamma (Ep:8)
- Aamir Ali as Shamma's ex-husband (Ep:8)
- Kamran Siddiqui as old master of Shamma (Ep:8)
- Samiya Khan as Shamma's daughter (Ep:8)
- Ammara Khan as Bilquis (Ep:8)
- Saba Hameed as Ainy & Saif's mother (Ep:7)
- Ashar Siddiqui as Nadeem (Ep:7)
- Ehteshamuddin as Saleem (Ep:7)
- Tanyat Wajid as Shabnam (Ep:6)
- Saiban Khaliq as Nadeem (Ep:6)/Munawwar (Ep:10)
- Mehra Mehr as Saleem's wife (Ep:6)
- Sonya Hussain as Shazia (Ep:11)
- Sarah Khan as Khushi (Ep:10)
- Kamran Jeelani as Aqib (Ep:10)
- Durood Javed as Munawwar's sister-in-law (Ep:10)/Doctor (Ep:16)
- Lubna Aslam as Khushi and Aqib's mother (Ep:10)
- Ali Abbas as Faisal (Ep:11)
- Sanam Chaudhry as Zubia (Ep:11)/Meena (Ep:15)
- Nargis Rasheed as Faisal's mother (Ep:11)
- Kiran Tabeer as Banto (Ep:12)/Hina (Ep:24)
- Samina Ahmad as Riaz's mother (Ep:12)
- Sania Saeed as Sanam (Ep:14)
- Aijaz Aslam as Mansoor (Ep:14)/Seemi's husband (Ep:18)
- Seemi Pasha as Seemi's mother (Ep:18)
- Ghana Ali as Seemi (Ep:18)
- Paras Masroor as Kashi (Ep:15)
- Sitara Malik as Kashi's mother (Ep:15)
- Aamir Qureshi as Kashi's master (Ep:15)
- Saife Hassan as Bushra's father (Ep:16)/Ejaz (Ep:28)
- Muhammad Javed (Ep:16)
- Basit Ali Asad as Doctor (Ep:16)
- Ismat Zaidi as Shakira (Ep:17)/Laila's mother (Ep:23)
- Fouzia Mushtaq as Shakira's sister (Ep:17)
- Iffat Rahim as Abida (Ep:19)/Iffat (Ep:21)/Mehru (Ep:29)
- Tipu Sharif as The Teacher (Ep:19)
- Sara Razi as Farhat (Ep:19)
- Iqra Faiz as Nasreen (Ep:18)
- Sabreen Hisbani as Munni's mother (Ep:20)
- Arshiya Akbar as Zebo (Ep:20)/ (Ep:27)
- Anwar Iqbal as Munni's father (Ep:20)
- Kahkashan Faisal as Zahida (Ep:20)
- Shifa Akbar as Munni (Ep:20)
- Anamta Khan (Ep:20)
- Aihan Sher Khan as Zebo's father (Ep:20)
- Sarmad Khoosat as Sarmad (Ep:21)
- Almas Fidai as Aaliya (Ep:22)
- Nausheen Shah as Raheela (Ep:22)
- Ahmad Zeb as Faisal Sajjad (Ep:22)
- Umar Farooq as Riaz (Ep:12)/Hadi (Ep:23)
- Noman Masood as Humayun (Ep:24)
- Feroze Khan as Arslan (Ep:25)
- Ahmed Ali Akbar as Ahmer (Ep:25)
- Anam Tanveer as Saba (Ep:25)
- Arisha Razi as Bibi (Ep:27)
- Farhan Ali Agha as Mian Sahab (Ep:27)
- Adnan Shah Tipu as G. Mohammad (Ep:27)
- Hina Khawaja Bayat as Rehana (Ep:28)
- Amna Malik as Romeela (Ep:28)
- Seemi Raheel as Mehru's mother (Ep:29)
- Iqra Butt as Mishi (Ep:29)
- Daniyal Raheel as Jameel (Ep:29)
- Parveen Akbar as Naina's mother (Ep:30)
- Omair Rana as Sikander (Ep:31)
- Uzma Hassan as Nadia (Ep:31)
- Raheed M. Alam as Jamaal (Ep:31)
- Noor Bukhari as Maham (Ep:32)
- Faris Shafi as Faisal
- Shamil Khan as Fahad (Ep:32)
- Sawera Nadeem as Meena (Ep:33)
- Farhan Ally Agha as Jameel (Ep:33)
- Laila Wasti as Wafa (Ep:35)
- Ramsha Khan as Masooma (Ep:35)
- Tipu Sharif as Fawad (Ep:35)

=== Special thanks ===
- Sabreen Hisbani
- Soniya Hussain
- Ayesha Omer
- Maria Wasti
- Ushna Shah
- Nadia Hussain
- Nausheen Shah
- Hira Mani
- Aleena Roy
- Tooba Siddiqui
- Hassan Zia

== Episodes ==
=== Episode - 1 ===
Airing date	Episode name	Writer	Director	Producer	Cast
30 October 2016	Jhoota Burtan (جھوٹا برتن); lit: Used utensil	Ambar Faisal	Angeline Malik	Angelic Films	Hassan Ahmed, Hira Salman, Ushna Shah

It revolves around a married couple, Saba (Hira Salman) and Kamran (Hassan Ahmed). They ask Jameela (servant) to recommend another servant if he/she is interested. She recommends Rozi (Ushna Shah). Saba is strict with her servants especially with Rozi. She drinks water in Saba's glass, an act that gives the episode its title. Saba comes and strictly treats her when she did this. On the other side, Kamran is in love with Rozi later. Munshee (servant of the same house) likes Rozi but she refused to marry him as she always thinks that he is of her uncle's age. She wears Saba's shoes; Kamran sees her but does not tells this to Saba, rather tells Rozi not to do it again. His care-free and calming nature leads Rozi's heart in love of Kamran. Saba gives old clothes to Rozi. When Rozi wears it, load shedding occurs and Kamran, not knowing that she is Rozi, touches her. Rozi gets scared. When electricity returns, he realizes that the one he was touching was Rozi and not Saba. Saba goes with her friend. She forgets her phone in her home and when she comes back, she overhears Kamran's and Rozi's romantic conversation inside the room. She weeps.

=== Episode - 2 ===
Airing date	Episode name	Writer	Director	Producer	Cast
6 November 2016	Shatranj (شطرنج); lit: Chess	Khalid Ahmed	Angeline Malik	Angelic Films	Ayesha Omer, Hammad Farooqui, Alyy Khan

It revolves around the couple of Ayaz (Hammad Farooqui) and Aliya (Ayesha Omer). Ayaz and his step-father (Alyy Khan) live together with non-peaceful manner. Ayaz asks 7 Lakhs from his step- father which the latter refuses to give him. Ayaz's step-father plays Chess (SHATRANJ) and Ayaz wins in the chess so he gives him cheque. Both Aliya (Ayesha Omer) and (Alyy Khan) are writers. Aliya visits Ayaz's home. Slightly, Aliya and Ayaz's stepfather (Alyy Khan) start to fall in love. Aliya tells him the plot of the book which she has written. He also adds story in that book. Ayaz sees them and gets shocked at their increasing closeness. Aliya gets an opportunity to model. Ayaz doesn't allow Aliya as he thinks that modelling is not a good thing. He tries to use her to con his stepfather out of his house. However Aliya announces her love for his stepfather who reciprocates. Finally they live a happy life and tell this to Ayaz.

=== Episode - 3 ===
Airing date	Episode name	Writer	Director	Producer	Cast
13 November 2016	Tasawwur (تصور); lit: Imagination	Kishore Adeel Jaffri	Angeline Malik	Angelic Films	Uroosa Siddiqui, Maria Wasti, Samdhan Khan, Zain Kanwal, Nabeel Kanwal, Fazal Baltistani

It revolves around an arrogant girl, Nargis (Uroosa Siddiqui), who thinks she is the most beautiful girl in this world. She is treated kindly by her loving sister-in-law (Maria Wasti). (Maria Wasti) was married to Nargis' dead brother Rizwan. Nargis thinks that she will get her dream's shehzada soon. She never accepts the proposals which her sister-in-law finds for her. Once, she was offered to marry Kulsoom's brother but they abandoned that plan because of her arrogance. She mostly reads novel and digests. Her sister-in-law tell her to not marry another man they will betray her but she ignores it. Several men (Portrayed by actors Samdhan Khan, Fazal Baltistani, Muhammad Hanif, Zain Kanwal, Nabeel Kanwal, Asif) are fiancées of Nargis. Finally she learns that was all her imagination and no one like Tasavvur exists which makes her feel bad.

=== Episode - 4 ===
Airing date	Episode name	Writer	Director	Producer	Cast
20 November 2016	Darmiyaan (درمیان); lit: Between	Zafar Mairaj	Angeline Malik	Angelic Films	Zahid Ahmed, Farah Shah, Noor Khan, Younus Khan, Mariyam

It revolves around Hassaam (Zahid Ahmed), a film actor whose love is Romaisa (Noor Khan). He is mostly known for his films and has much fame but feels like he doesn't need it. Although, he is an actor but he mostly visits a book shop in which he found her and her mother (Farah Shah). He makes a successful drama serial with his friend, called Sehrish in which his name is Rehman while her name is Zoya. He is finds himself falling in love with Romaisa's mother but he still likes Romaisa. He comes to Romaisa's mother to seek her daughter's hand. But her mother still likes Hassaam and refuses to give her daughter's hand to him. She tells him that even though he is an actor, she loved him and tells him that if he really loves her, he must not marry Romaisa. Although he doesn't accept her request he leaves. When Romaisa arrives, she is confused because he had told her that he would come in her home but he didn't as that's what her mother tells her. Her mother tells her that he never came and that he has betrayed her and left her for good. Romaisa presumably doesn't know that her mother loves Hassaam. Hassan leaves his lighter behind on purpose so that Romaisa doesn't have any misunderstandings about Hassam. Romaisa finds that lighter and alerts her mother that she's aware of the truth and her mother feels guilty.

=== Episode - 5 ===
Airing date	Episode name	Writer	Director	Producer	Cast
27 November 2016	Qubool Hai (قبول ہے); lit: I accept	Khurram Abbas	Angeline Malik	Angelic Films	Alyy Khan, Aiman Khan, Gul-e-Rana, Anwar Iqbal

The story is about a girl (Aiman Khan), who walks through road and then waits for van and then when it comes, she sits there and comes in home. Asif (Alyy Khan) is in car and she also sits there and Fariya (Aiman Khan) seeks help for her father's critical health. A man (Anwar Iqbal) comes in home and says to his wife (Gul E Rana) that he given him potato at price of Rs. 100 and he fought with him. He asks from his wife that what Khurram does and if he will not marry his daughter with Khurram. Fariya comes home and says that she didn't go any fees because she got an advance. She thinks same what Asif said her and what her mother told her that Asif takes care of her family. Fariya's father said that because of Fatiya this home is running and what he will do after Fariya's marriage. He said that his respiratory disease will never let him do anything because it is due to his contribution in chemical industry that he has respiratory disease. Fariya came into car, Asif given him a ring and said that he will marry her. Fariya's father came into home and said that he found a shop which will cost him Rs.12000. His wife said that because of his illness these rupees will be spent. A boy was again following Fariya, she said him that why he always follows him. Fariya came in home that marriage is not allowed because if she will go then home's expenditure who will pay? She waits for a van. A boy says that he apologize for his mistake and says that he loves her and says that he knows all story of their home. She refuses and goes to van. She tells that guy whole story of her home and father and says that if she will marry, her home will be full of thirst. She gets call from her mother that her father is at last stage if death. She comes in home and says that Siraj (her father's friend) knew that her father has Respiratory Disease. She meets again with him, whose name revealed to be Yasir. She says him that her home has long story which she cannot tell. Asif said to Fariya that he has not any extra money to give her. In anger, he kicked her out if the car. Fariya's mother was making soap for Fariya's father saying that she has got a new relation but Fariya's father refuses saying that she mustn't do this. Fariya sits in van and thinks that how she will help her home in such a poverty. Yasir again asked from her that what happened her but she didn't tell to anybody what happened and gone to home. Fariya's mother said that no need to worry if she hasn't got salary. Fariya still thinks how she will do and cries loudly that what will be of her home. Fariya's mother says to her husband that again they are saying to give their daughter to him. She also says that he is a rich businessman and they will marry and they are good people and says he will call him and he accepts. She is happy that she is marrying Yasir but is shocked to find Asif is Yasir's father. The show ends in Fariya accepting marriage with weeping.

=== Episode - 6 ===
Airing date	Episode name	Writer	Director	Producer	Cast
4 December 2016	Kohi Nahi Aayga (کوئی نہیں آئے گا); lit: No one will come	Khalid Ahmed	Angeline Malik	Angelic Films	Shamim Hilaly, Imran Ashraf, Kaif Ghaznavi, Hyder Chandio, Ikram Abbasi

The story revolves around Bibi (Shamim Hilaly) waiting for her son Aamir (Hyder Chandio) and her granddaughter to come from America, where Aamir works. She is treated by a less mature woman, Jamra'at (Kaif Ghaznavi), who is in love with Ramzan (Imran Ashraf). Bibi always thinks that no one will come until her death. She is happy when learning that Aamir is coming but is sad when he tells her that he will not come because of his meeting. Jamra'at loves Ramzan and he advises her to marry her early because his parents want him to marry his uncle's daughter Sajida. He is a poor man and thinks that after selling jewellery of Bibi, he will make his own shop. Jamra'at says to Bibi that she is her maternal aunt because her grandmother had given her birth. But she is unaware of such a fact. That is why she is referred to as Khala Bi. Jamra'at asks Bibi about Ramzan that she wants to marry him and wants jewellery. She refuses this marriage as she says that money is lost. Ramzan tells Jamra'at to steal the jewellery at night. She steals it but (Shamim Hilaly) sees her and because of her cancer (of which she is unaware), she says to her that her tongue is black. She separates from Ramzan after this and forces him to marry Sajida. Jamra'at lies to Aamir that Bibi has cancer and she is in her last breath. He immediately comes and finds his mother well and healthy. He blames her asking why she told him a lie and because of her lie he had left his daughter Chutki with someone. Bibi tries to tell him that she really has cancer according to the doctor (Ikram Abbasi). But he does not listen and leaves. Bibi suffers advanced cancer and is found dead on the bed when Jamra'at plays Ludo.

=== Episode - 7 ===
Airing date	Episode name	Writer	Director	Producer	Cast
11 December 2016	Jee Le Zara ( جی لے ذرا); lit: Live a little	Samina Nazir	Angeline Malik	Angelic Films	Saba Hameed, Ashar Siddiqui, Ehteshamuddin, Faria Sheikh, Tanyat Wajid, Saiban Khaliq, Mehra Mehr

The story is of widow, (Saba Hameed) waiting for her son Saif and Ainy to come. She lives alone in her home where Saleem (Plumber) (Ehteshamuddin) comes to fix her pipes which mostly do work. She is unaware of fact that Saleem's home is nearby her home. She catches him when she saw his loud coming from his room to her room. Saleem starts taking interest in her and decides to marry her. He says her in lie that his wife has died but it is true that he has son Nadeem (Saiban Khaliq) and daughter Shabnam (Tanyat Wajid). Their love increases day-by-day and she also takes interest in Saleem and decides to marry him. Ainy (Faria Sheikh) and Saif (Mehra Mehr) refuse her but she decides it because she cannot sleep alone because of dreadful dreams. Nadeem understands that his father is interested in her and Shabnam goes with her boyfriend taking her (Saba Hameed's jewellery with her. In Last, when she decides to marry him and comes to say him, she sees him with his loving wife. She is scared and sadly weeps.

=== Episode - 8 ===
Airing date	Episode name	Writer	Director	Producer	Cast
18 December 2016	Barrister Maasi ( بیرسٹرماسي); lit: Lawyer Maid	Tayyab Nazir	Angeline Malik	Angelic Films	Hina Dilpazeer, Asif Raza Mir, Shahida Murtaza, Aamir Ali, Kamran Siddiqui, Samiya Khan, Ammara Khan

The story revolves around Shamma (Hina Dilpazeer) acting as servant in home. Her another friend Bilqees advises her new home to work. She comes there and meets its landlord, Hameed Azfar (Asif Raza Mir). he treats her strictly but not very much because he starts liking her. She later finds that he is a barrister. She later finds there her ex-husband who takes alcohol and they are separated. She asks him about his family and he says her that he has son and a daughter and wife that died 10 years ago. In night, she says him that she wants to go home but he refuses saying there is strike. She and He are lake of sleep. She says her that why his sons and daughters are not coming because her daughter comes many times and he must recall his children so that he can prevent sadness. Her daughter comes with her father and says her that she didn't even care of her. But Hameed came and said him (not knowing that he is Shamma's ex-husband) that if he is not related with her then why has he come and says him that if he came again that he will put sand's oil in his head. Shamma looks happy and does anything to make Hameed happy and he sees him continuously. While doing shave, Hameed does false pain by his mouth and she immediately comes there and washes it where he proposes her. She doesn't give an answer at first but then she accepts on her daughter's force. Her daughter forces her to marry because of his richness and because she hates her father so she wanted him. Her old landlords (husband & wife) come and say her that she has now come here. When that barrister tells her that she is his wife, that landlord husband mistakenly broke glass. She asked her new name and he said that her name is BARRISTER MAASI, Shamma gone immediately with weeps.

=== Episode - 9 ===
Airing date	Episode name	Writer	Director	Producer	Cast
25 December 2016	Maa Jaesi ( ماں جیسی); lit: Like a mother	Khurram Abbas	Angeline Malik	Angelic Films	Bilal Abbas Khan, Farah Shah, Nadia Afgan, Tabbassum Naz

The story is of a boy, Munney Mian (Bilal Abbas) who often visits his friend, Kharafa (Nadia Afgan, who his mother dislikes and also looks almost his mother's age. His mother (Farah Shah) knows that all her things that have disappeared are actually given to Kharafa by her son as gifts. At first it seems like Munney Mian is a servant of Kharafa. One day, he gives his mother's white dupatta to Kharafa. His mother, enraged, goes to Kharafa's house to get her dupatta back from Kharafa, ends up finding out that her dupatta has been dyed yellow by her. Disappointed, she leaves Kharafa's house, dragging her son with her back to their home. At home, she gives him a ring and strictly warns him not to give it to anyone else because only his mother can wear it. Later, he again goes to Kharafa's house with flowers for her. She tells him she has some guests at her home so he has to wait for her. He keeps waiting for her but she doesn't come to him so he goes inside to check what's happening. He overhears her telling some guy that she loves getting churiyaan as gifts. While overhearing her conversation, he ultimately falls asleep. When Kharafa sees him she immediately tells him to go back home. He comes to home. A woman (Tabbassum Naz) says to his mother that he came from Kharafa in night. She says to her son that he has again made her face black by neighbours. But it is revealed that he is deaf and dumb. His mother breaks all churiyas that Munney bought for Kharafa and he took that and was seeing that continuously. His mother came and said him that he is an angel because he cannot talk and was crying. Munna was sleeping near bed. He talked in shortcuts with Kharafa that his mother broken that churiyas. She further says that her lover always brings churiyas for her. Munney becomes angry and breaks all thins and oes. Kharafa comes and amuses. A dust taker comes and asks for old dust but she refuses. Munna says to Kharafa that his mother is ill. The doctors say she has BP. Munney and Kharafa take care of her but after his mother's sudden death, Kharafa says him that she is also like his mother. On saying this, Munna takes her hand and let her get out of home. They both feel sad on their homes. While Munna cries a lot. On next day, he comes at her home for forgiveness. She forgives him and he gives her that ring which his mother give him.

=== Episode - 10 ===
Airing date	Episode name	Writer	Director	Producer	Cast
1 January 2017	Ghairat Mand ( غیرت مند); lit: Someone with dignity	Shahid Nizami	Angeline Malik	Angelic Films	Sarah Khan, Kamran Jeelani, Lubna Aslam

The story is based on two siblings, Khushi (Sarah Khan) and Aqib (Kamran Jeelani) who live in a middle class household. Khushi works at a job however her older brother, Aqib, is unemployed. Their mother (Lubna Aslam) is tired of Aqib's laziness. Aqib (Kamran Jeelani) spends his night playing cricket and his days with the neighborhood boys. The boys stare at every woman who walks down the street and make lewd comments, saying that no woman who steps out of the house is modest. One day, Aqib notices that his friends make a comment about a girl however stop talking about her once the girls brother walks by. This makes him start thinking that his friends probably talk about his sister as well. He begins accompanying his sister during her walk to the bus stop before and after work and notices another young man is always there. One day, Khushi forgets her diary on the bus and the young man from the bus gives it to her. Aqib notices them talking and begins believing that his sister has become an immodest woman, like his friends claim all working women are. His doubts and paranoia that his sister is having an affair begin increasing despite his sister denying all his claims. One night while playing a round of street cricket, he notices the same young man from the bus stop walking by. He follows him but loses him in the darkness of night. He walks by his house and notices a man jump over the gate and run away. In his paranoia, he believes he has caught his sister and the young man red-handed and he runs in and strangles his sister to death. He then rushes to tell his parents that he has gotten rid of the person who was trying to destroy his family's "ghairat" (dignity) only to find his parents bound and gagged. He realizes the man who jumped over the gate was a thief and that his sister was innocent all along.

=== Episode - 11 ===
Airing date	Episode name	Writer	Director	Producer	Cast
8 January 2017	Jhalli (جھلّی); lit: Crazy girl	Adeel Razzaq	Angeline Malik	Angelic Films	Alyy Khan, Soniya Hussain, Kanwal Nazar, Tasleem Ansari, Hisham Soomro, Muhammad Saleem

The story is of Parvez (Alyy Khan) and his mother, who thinks that Parvez would have child from his wife Shazia (Kanwal Nazar), but it is actually a false pregnancy for which his mother (Tasleem Ansari) and Parvez were happy for three months but Shazia told truth saying that she hid the truth because they were planning or second marriage. Parez and his mother plan to give divorce from Shazia, but he didn't give him but when she said him that she will never allow him or second marriage, he immediately divorces her. His mother searches another relation for him for which he agrees. He finds that girl, as (Soniya Hussain) who is foolish-treated girl, and often plays with fan and other toys. Parvez also tells to his mother that she is foolish but cute and shying girl. Parvez's mother says to Parvez to take her to hospital because 5 months have been passed on their marriage but doctor say her that tests are clear but she is not pregnant yet. On next day, they go to Dargaah to pray to have her a baby and also goes to Moulvi (Muhammad Saleem) for praying for her. She comes to Parvez's room but he was thinking so she played with toy so that he can wake up by water balloon. Parvez tells her that she should pray for a baby and she accepts to pray that Parvez should be a father. Parvez does some tests and doctor (Hisham Soomro) says him that it is main problem in men that sometimes they don't become a father and he you are suffering from that. He becomes sad and comes to home, his mother gives him cake and say him that he will become a father, he is shocked to listen and sees his wife, she give him an eye, which means she is telling lie. She laughs while he is sad.

=== Episode - 12 ===
Airing date	Episode name	Writer	Director	Producer	Cast
15 January 2017	Lawn Ka Three Piece Suit (لان کا تھری پیس سوٹ); lit: Lawn's Three Piece Suit	Saima Khurram Abbas	Angeline Malik	Angelic Films	Ali Abbas, Sanam Chaudhry, Nargis Rasheed, Angeline Malik (only voice)

The story is of Zubia (Sanam Chaudhry) who firstly makes egg and Annie (Angeline Malik only voice) calls her and tells her that there is promotion of lawn's three-piece suit and asks her if she want to go but she refuses to go. She gives breakfast to Faisal (Ali Abbas) and tells her that they can win suit when they will ask general knowledge questions and she asks if she participate but her mother-in-law (Nargis Rasheed) calls her and she maintains her hair and takes care of her. She has a sneezing problem. She tells her that in her building people are coming to promote new lawn and she agrees. Her neighbour again calls her and she gives her lawn's suit and says her to check and she sees and returns her after seeing. She gives Faisal a tea and asks her that she want a lawn three-piece suit but he refuses saying that he had done all things for a new apartment. On next day, that woman again calls her that all women are saying that they want lawn's all three-piece suit but she says she is not one of them. In accordance to Zubia, that her Khursheed aunt and Shaista Aapa is one of them. She tells to her mother-in-law that Annie's husband brings all things for her and she says that he is an engineer that's why and Zubia tells her that Faisal ought be engineer at first. She later asks from her the general questions and her mother-in-law knows all the answers. Faisal also asks her questions she knows and she tells all answers and he says her that they will not ask from her these easy questions and says her he has not problem with her quiz but he has problem with her attitude and says her that she has also other occupations to do. She later wears clothes and OMG!! her mother-in-law is unconscious. She brings her to hospital. Faisal says her to take care of her mother-in-law. Her neighbour calls her and says in accordance, Jameela aunt also won the three-piece suit. Zubia on next day polished his shoes and says Faisal to buy a new one but he refuses, saying that his mother needs care and this home, all money is spent here. Her neighbour Annie calls her to buy some important things to buy. She buys and gives her taking cash herself and said her that no cash given. She shies on her mistake and wants to return her. She writes letter to Annie saying that she done a mistake that she didn't give her a cash money she got from there but she returns her saying that she can take it. Faisal calls her saying that he got a new tuition who give her an advance fee. She becomes happy and excited but he says that she shouldn't be happy. At night, he says her what she is thinking but she tells her that if there would be a baby, how would we afford money. He sleeps while she thinks to say him that she loves blue colored-suits but there are no enough blue suits. She on next day gets Rs. 320 from cash account from her neighbour. She gives him dinner and they talk about affording suit. She says him that from some days, she is working for Kifayat Sha'ari (Saving) to her neighbor. He says that this is a very good thing and she can buy one lawn three-piece suit per month. He finds shoes from dining table. She tells him that apart from the three-piece suit, they can buy other things as well. He becomes very happy and he also gives her gift of Happy Anniversary Day. He gives her blue-coloured suit which she liked always. She says to him thank you so much, and they live a very happy life.

=== Episode - 13 ===
Airing date	Episode name	Writer	Director	Producer	Cast
22 January 2017	Aisa Bus Dramon Main Hota Hai (ایسا بس ڈراموں میں ہوتا ہے); lit: This happens only in Dramas	Bee Gul	Angeline Malik	Angelic Films	Kiran Tabeer, Samina Ahmad, Omer Farooq

The story is of Banto (Kiran Tabeer) who acts as strange daughter-in-law of (Samina Ahmad). She says her to open T.V. because she has to watch channel and her family is best favorites of dramas. She is inspired of dramas in which people apply makeup. She also actually wants to be fashion girl like them. They watch all dramas mostly. Riaz (Banto's husband) (Omer Farooq) is polite guy, mostly is distressed of Bantu and his mother's fight. One day, her T.V. gets stop suddenly, it is found by references that their T.V. has stopped working. She becomes bore without T.V. One day, Banto cleans her room and makes full acting of daughter-in-law. Riaz said to them that T.V. cannot be repaired because repairer is saying that T.V. cannot be repaired again because it is discharged permanently. Riaz again gets angry when they both fight on salt dissolved in food and immediately goes distressed by their fight. They both again think that perhaps they will not be able to watch next episode of a drama. Her mother-in-law further says that she doesn't like repeat dramas but she likes to watch dramas on T.V. Banto says her that she will let her watch drama on T.V. but if she gives her yellow dupatta. She agrees. Because of their fight, she says her that they are respectable that they have accepted her otherwise other would get out her. While coming to room, she says that all fight her whenever they need. Riaz (Omer Farooq) says her like she beats his mother. While Banto tells her mother-in-law about episode that her mother-in-law stressed on daughter-in-law. She then gives her example that like you and me. While in episode, she also tells her about that mother-in-law arranged second marriage for her son. While Riaz says that he is collecting money for motorbike and not for T.V. While when Riaz comes, he again sees them both fighting on dramas and comparing it with real life and throws his luggage and goes saying that his heart never says him to come to home only because of this fight. He drinks water and sits in a seat. Banto asks if he wants to sleep but he refuses because off belly pain. His mother calls her and says that she is disturbing her son in night. She cries and sleeps. She makes "Khichdi" for him in morning and says him that she has made because of his belly pain. Riaz looks so sad and angry because of their fight. He remembers her their happy anniversary on which she again weeps and goes. She tells her mother-in-law about last episode of that drama and she says that they were divorced in last episode on what her mother-in-law wanted. And she further says that after that daughter-in-law lived in her brother's home. When Farzana came, she told different story of last episode. She says that it never happens in real life because it happens only in dramas. Riaz brings a TV for them which reunites all families and his mother also looks happier and thinks that now they will see all episodes on TV.

=== Episode - 14 ===
Airing date	Episode name	Writer	Director	Producer	Cast
29 January 2017	Chewing Gum (چیونگم); lit: Chewing Gum	Adeel Razzaq	Angeline Malik	Angelic Films	Farah Shah, Aijaz Aslam, Sania Saeed

The story is of Mansoor (Aijaz Aslam), a wealthy person, has a girlfriend, (Farah Shah). While, Sanam (Sania Saeed) is his actual wife. He overworks her with his non-ending needs i-e: coffee. His girlfriend comes in their home and she Sanam and she are friends for 2 years. While, he says her why has she come here and she also says him that why then he is here as her best friend's husband. While she says her that how she got her address but she said her that she had got her 3 months ago. She said her that she is also girl-friend of Mansoor. But he can never come in affair with someone and they are very funny friends doing mazaaks. He asked her that how many days would she live here and she said that she would gone 4 days to 12 days. She said him that she thinks that he is in love with other girl, call comes of her that she shouldn't tell her all secret. He comes out and says her what has she told to Sanam but she says that she has told nothing to her. They were listening to music of Fawad Khan which were famous to her. She says him if he loves his wife and he gives no reply. SHe again ask him if he has love affair with other girl and without replying they both go and he says her that how she can be her best friend, she is genius and clever. She says her to go until Mansoor's anger goes. He meets her out and asks her what she wants to that she says she wants 5,00,000 otherwise she will tell all truth to Sanam to which he seeks Sanam's help on which she agrees as her problem. On next day, she outs her from her home and says her that she is eating chewing gum like she is eating someone's bones. She says that if she thinks that she has come here for money. She says yes to her. She says her that she swears she will never come here again and attaches her mouth chewing gum with her hand. She also says to Mansoor but is aware of their secret relationship still. Next day, he calls her name but she leaves his home saying that he was wrong that she need money but instead she has all that she needed. She comes to her home with eating chewing gum and staring at her.

=== Episode - 15 ===
Airing date	Episode name	Writer	Director	Producer	Cast
5 February 2017	Taxi Driver (ٹیکسی ڈرائیور); lit: Taxi Driver	Saji Gul	Angeline Malik	Angelic Films	Sanam Chaudhry, Paras Masroor

The show starts with Kashi (Paras Masroor), in a car with another woman. While, Meena (Sanam Chaudhry) is frightened to go to her husband but goes. He looks like Taxi driver. His master (Aamir Qureshi) comes in his car and asks his wife name, he says "Meena". While, they talk about studies, he says that he has done many ihsaans on him. Meena calls him and says that they are at bus stop and he should come to pick her, she scattered. He likes her shying for sake him. While his master's son Sunny suffers an illness, but he agrees saying to go to Meena after admitting chotay sahab in hospital. He gives big sacrifice. While, Meena comes from bus and waits for him but he doesn't come, she goes to PCO for calling him. While, he doesn't find Meena in train. He cries in home, his master and he find him together. While finding, she calls him and says that she is near PCO. She slaps him when he comes and says to her that he is finding here from 1 week and reveals the truth that someone said her that he saw Kashi in hospital. She gone with them. Someone lets her come to home and in bedroom, he says her that it is Kashi's home, charges phone. She is surprised about this. She sees that her door is locked. She speaks to him that she is locked but he doesn't listen. That master of Kashi wakes her up and rapes her, she tries to say that she wants to go back. He says her that Kashi has left her here with his own wish. And that old servant gives her injection of unconsciousness and she becomes unconscious. The master again rapes her and she escapes. Kashi is surprised and, crying, says that it is impossible that he can do this. He comes to master's home after this, his servants grab him and beat him long. And that master also beat him along. They come to home and his mother ask him that what was happened and he said that his job has gone. They come to room, Meenu says him that he may think that she is "naa Pak" (unclean). In night, while eating, he throws food saying that why she doesn't shy on what happened with her. While Meenu says him to do a job again. His mother says to Kashi that he will be father and it is his khushkabri. He leaves food and says to Meenu that she should abdomen pregnancy because it can be child of her master. She says ok. His mother (Sitara Malik) says to Kashi that it is their child. He beats her long and asks why she hadn't told her that it is their child. She was able to stop him. They both stay quiet. She advises him to go to place where no one identifies them. But he can divorce her. They both follow their master but an accident recovers to be done. They go in river where they try to suicide but nothing occurs. He goes in car but his car doesn't open. He finds a window there and jumps from there coming down from steps. That is his actually master's home. That master says him to give Meena for starting job again. He agrees and picks her from car to his home and she says him that she will do all deals there.

=== Episode - 16 ===
Airing date	Episode name	Writer	Director	Producer	Cast
12 February 2017	Maut Baraye Farokht (موت برائےفروخت ); lit: Death is for sale	Samina Nazir	Angeline Malik	Angelic Films	Aiman Khan, Saife Hassan

The story is of Bushra (Aiman Khan) and her father (Saife Hassan) working hard for water because in their village getting water is difficult. While, Bushra decides to pray for people to always die so that her father could get money. While, in night, they pray that a king should die to get more money. In hospital, a new doctor comes, a nurse asks her if he has any problem with anything. While again, her father says her that an old woman has come into hospital and is living in her last breaths and is sure to die soon. Doctor comes and says to old woman's daughter that she is fine, we are giving her oxygen. Her father says that what God wanted that happened but she said that it is fault of doctors. She comes to home with her father and says that if she could get 500 more rupees, she could buy a new mobile. While, another woman's brother is unconscious because of drinking alcohol but he also survives! Bushra, angrily goes to her home, pushes a tap to get water and water comes hardly. She comes to home and shakes her bhandara. She abuses to doctor to not let die patient. She says to kill doctor. She again prays that someone should die. But again that patient survives. Doctor sees her and again says her that why has she come here and gives her money but she refuses. She goes to home where same doctor comes in ike and asks her to do nursing of hospital. She doesn't give answer but comes in hospital to be a nurse. Nurse guides her, she falls with that doctor and they both smile. She comes to home in night, where her father says that 3 persons died in highway and tap contains much water. She says her father if he could make her doctor. She sleeps in bed in ankles. Doctor comes and wakes her up that patient is dying and she is sleeping and warns that her father will be responsible for this. She doesn't go while doctor gives her glass of tang to make her energy strong. He apologizes to her for his evil. She says him that she wants to go but he says her that he will drop her, she agrees. They live near graveyard. Her father asks her with whom has she come and she says doctor. She says that she helped patient in surviving and he survived. He becomes angry and says that whether she has to support her father or that doctor. While, a man gets oxygen, she removes mask and while he breathes hard, she adds mask again and he breathes again. She comes to home and breaks her bhandaara. She buys book from it and sleeps when her father says her. She remains in thinking what happened with her today and that doctor. When she goes to hospital, her father says to her that doctor died because he get fall from truck into bike. She comes to hospital, nurse Rozi tells her that doctor is behind her and shows her his death body. She weeps on his death.

=== Episode - 17 ===
Airing date	Episode name	Writer	Director	Producer	Cast
19 February 2017	Yazeedan (یزیدن); lit: A ruthless tyrant (girl)	Adeel Razzaq	Angeline Malik	Angelic Films	Imran Ashraf, Nadia Afgan, Ismat Zaidi, Fouzia Mushtaq

The story is of Aasiya (Nadia Afgan), celebrating her birthday. Her mother Shakira (Ismat Zaidi) calls her and says her never to give her rice in night and says her why has he applied makeup in lips. She says that today is the day when she was born. She makes tea for them. While, her foster brother Mustaqeem (Imran Ashraf) wants to give her gift for her birthday. She gives her tea and warns her to wash cup after taking otherwise she will never give him tea again. When she goes, he says her "happy birthday". She says what has he said with angerness but he changes talk. He laughs. While, Mustaqeem goes to office, but she calls him and says that if she had power, she can give him breakfast but he refuses. He gives her Aasiya's gift and goes. She calls Aasiya "Yazeedan". She comes and says that Mustaqeem is not her brother and he is her foster brother. She goes to her sister (Fouzia Mushtaq), for Aasiya's marriage and she advises her to marry Mustaqeem with Aasiya. But she says that she has never thought that about their marriage but she says her that this son-in-law she cannot get in seven skies. She makes "Sheermall" for them and cries and says that if her father would be alive, she would not be like this but Aasiya says that when he was alive, he would make her cry and says that no one loves each other with heart and soul and tries to grab other's property like foster brother. He prays Namaz and when he ends praying, her mother says to him to marry Aasiya to which he agrees. On next day, she comes with anger and says that he was her hateful brother and not a lover that she should marry him. But she says him that it is not her decision and it is Mustaqeem's decision. She weeps and goes to her room. She comes to her for apologies and says her to apologize to Mustaqeem, her father and herself. She says that she has forgiven her father, her mother but not Mustaqeem and says her to prepare for her and Mustaqeem. They marry each other where Mustaqeem tells her all his secrets of life that when he was 5 years old, his parents had left him in which there was not his fault. By his all secrets, she laughs and warns him that after this day, she will not leave him and will take her "kameez" like he has done with her. After that Mustaqeem feels that Shakira is dead, he informs Aasiya about her death. She cries up to night, where Mustaqeem comes to her and says her that if she wants divorce, he is ready to give her divorce. She appreciates him and kicks him out of her room. She gives him plate to wash it and says him if she can make food then he has to wash. She orders with anger to him to wash the plates. She then comes to the lawyer and says him to take divorce from him. He advice her not to take divorce but she agrees him. She comes to home, he smokes and he says to her that why is she not taking revenge. She tries to kick him out of home but he says her that he is the landlord of home and he can kick her anytime. He said her that he loved home and not her. He says her that he is making her work more easy by divorcing her on her right ear and left ear and one on face and with eagerness, kicks her out of home and laughs at home at what he did to her.

=== Episode - 18 ===
Airing date	Episode name	Writer	Director	Producer	Cast
26 February 2017	Bechari (بیچاری); lit: Miserable	Shehzad Javed	Angeline Malik	Angelic Films	Aijaz Aslam, Ghana Ali, Seemi Pasha, Iqra Faiz

The story starts off with (Aijaz Aslam) asking for Seemi's (Ghana Ali) hand in marriage from her mother (Seemi Pasha). Seemi's mother seems hesitant and worried for her daughter however he assures her that he will take care of her. The night of the wedding, Seemi's mother tells Seemi she should tell her husband the truth about herself. Seemi ignores this advice and mentions how she wishes her father would have come to the wedding. After the wedding, Seemi's husband takes Seemi's phone and locks her in the house as he goes to work. Their neighbor, Nasreen (Iqra Faiz), notices the lock and becomes concerned. Seemi begins having flashbacks to moments when her husband has abused her. Nasreen visits on day and finds Seemi depressed with the house in a mess. Seemi tells her that her husband is abusive and she is sick of this life and feeling suicidal. She asks to borrow Nasreen's phone which she uses to call her father. Her father tells her that her mother has died and that the family could not reach her due to her phone being off. Seemi beings crying. Nasreen calls the father's number back but the operator says the number is not in service. Seemi's mother and husband then show up the apartment. Her husband says that it was Seemi who asked him to take her phone and lock the apartment. Her mother explains that Seemi's father was very abusive and that he died when Seemi was young. Ever since then, Seemi has believed all husbands are abusive and she has never been able to accept her father's death. She tells Seemi's husband that Seemi needs psychological treatment and that if he wants to leave Seemi, she would understand. In the final scene, Seemi wakes up the next morning and asks her husband for her phone since she wants to call her father. He reluctantly agrees. She tells her father that she wants him to visit soon. She tells her husband that her father says hello and her husband says tell him I said hello too. Her husband looks on while Seemi continues talking to herself, believing she is on the phone with her father.

=== Episode - 19 ===
Airing date	Episode name	Writer	Director	Producer	Cast
5 March 2017	Manhoos (منحوس); lit: Ill-fated	Fawad Kashif	Angeline Malik	Angelic Films	Iffat Rahim, Tipu Sharif, Sara Razi

The episode starts from Safiyyah (Iffat Rahim), who sews and also thinks about her husband and her relative that how they have blamed her and do mazaaq with her. She comes to kitchen and forgets work, and returns to sew clothes fast with cry. Her daughter Farhat (Sara Razi) comes and says to her where her cat John is and she goes to find it. She, with having cat in hand, in night says her to do 11th class and 2nd division so that all can give proposals to her. She, in morning, says to her that a tuition teacher will come to her to teach her. She, at night, asks Farhat that where is her John but she didn't know. Farhat is egoistic towards her mother. She gets call from someone and says to her mother that it is the wrong number but it's not and she takes his call. She says to him to not call her this time. Her teacher (Tipu Sharif) comes and teaches her global warming. She replies her friend Zunera. Her teacher says her that where is her mind at the time of test. Saifiyyah comes and takes mobile of her with her and he smiles. He brings for her some vegetables, she says him that why had he done this Taqaluf. While her daughter Farhat comes saying that her cat John has died from car falling. She tells whole story to her teacher and says that because of that all she loves they die, all call her manhoos (ill-fated). Her daughter says her not to do sog of her cat. Her teacher comes again in her home. Safiyyah says her that it's not time of Farhat's coming. But he says her that he has now come for her. He says her that she should not cry for John's death because it's natural and gives her flowers-packed and goes. She smiles at it. Farhat talks slowly with her boyfriend so that her mother cannot listen, her mother pack flowers which he given her. Farhat again calls her boyfriend when she goes. When she goes to college, he again calls her. She says her that he has affair with Sumera, her friend. She cuts her call and she at night listens to sad music and not comes to tuition. Her teacher comes and says her that they have been working for 1 year and she wants to waste it. She gives accurate answer and he praises her. At night, she says her teacher whole story, her teacher says her that he will not come again in her way again. Her mother comes to give her tea and he smiles. She has sight of her when he comes. Farhat says her that she should be happy like she is today. Meanwhile, the teacher calls his friend Mohsin, he cuts his call and says her in dreams that he is in love with someone. Her teacher tells to Safiyyah that he was 5 when his father had died and his mother struggled to death by protecting him and says him that they will now take tea outside. She said to her teacher that she was young when her mother died and her struggling father died and her husband revealed his love for other. Meanwhile, Farhat says her that doing test in lovely season is wastage of time. While, the teacher says to Safiyyah to marry him but she says to take care of people but he refuses. She takes her Abbaya for marriage. While, he changes her name to Abida. He says her that she has never got a true love but he first takes her name and then suddenly says her to give her daughter Frahat for marriage. She is surprised and Farhat laughs. She again sews clothes fast, Farhat says to Abida that why her teacher has not come. Someone calls her saying that the teacher has died because of her. She again calls her manhoos and says her that because of her, once again her teacher has died. She shows her face guilty and a little bit angry.

=== Episode - 20 ===
Airing date	Episode name	Writer	Director	Producer	Cast
12 March 2017	Gudde Guddiya Ka Biyah (گڈے گڑیا کا بیاہ); lit: Marriage of two Dolls	Saji Gul	Angeline Malik	Angelic Films	Sabreen Hisbani, Arshiya Akbar, Anwar Iqbal, Kahkashan Faisal, Shifa Akbar, Anamta Khan, Aihan Sher Khan

The story is of a little girl, Munni (Shifa Akbar) who makes engagement of their doll with any other boy (Gudda). Her mother (Sabreen Hisbani) beats her a lot on her going with her friends and marrying her doll with other while her father (Anwar Iqbal) always supports her and looks a patient. She sleeps with her doll. Her friend, Zebo (Arshiya Akbar) wants to marry her Gudda with her doll. She proposes Munni to marry her Gudda with her doll. At night, she says her to this mother but her mother grabs her doll and says to see her auqat and her father's and says her to say Zebo that her Guddiya has died. Munni gives bad dua to her that God blast her son which was in her hand. Zebo comes. Munni hides herself inside khat. Zebo comes and says where is Munni but her mother lies that she has gone for clothes. Finally, Zebo's Gudda is married with doll. Suddenly Zebo's mother Zahida (Kahkashan Faisal) falls and is unconscious. While, Zebo is shifted to Munni's house for a while, until her mother recovers. While, her mother dies after sometime. While, Munni plays but her mother says her to her to go to Zebo to determine her condition but she says that Zebo is not talking with her. She says that if her mother die what will she feel so it is same with Zebo but she laughs. Her mother says that like her aunt she wants that she should die. When she goes, her mother keeps her toys in almari. Munni says Zebo to talk but she is quiet. While, her mother gives her Zebo's brother whom her mother given birth before her death. She tries to take off his breath so that he can die because her father chose him instead of his mother. She cries a lot. While, her friends say her that they will marry their gudda with someone else and not with her. She says her whatever they want to do they should do. They say them that it is not their fault that her mother has died. They fight with each other but stop because of Munni stops them to fight. While, Zebo comes to her mother and says that as Zebo revises her mother's memories she don't want to lose her mother. Her mother says to marry her guddiya with gudda. When she goes to Zebo, they play and Zebo is happy at that time. Zebo's father (Aihan Sher Khan) says to Munni's mother that she should arrange large gathering and there should be good decoration. While, Munni's mother steals rice of her doll. Munni sees her but never reveals it. While, Munni and her mother buys clothes for her doll. They do not like the shop but she secretly steals his clothes. When they come home, her father is uncoucious. They admit him to hospital while Zebo's father comes and gives her money. While, she tells to Zebo that when her mother died, her doll's marriage was stopped and same is here now. While, her friends throw her doll in fire and doll destroys. She comes to her mother and says that it is because of her that she stolen rice from Zebo's home and they destroyed her doll. While her mother slaps her and says her that she has done but she should not compromise it. While, her father recovers and finally their gudda and guddies marry. They dance on it. While, her mother decorates Munni so that she look doll's mother and explains her to say Qubool Hai to Nikah of her doll. She does the same and when she goes, she is actually marrying Zebo's father. She throws her doll and cries a lot to do Rukhsati because she was unaware of marrying Zebo's father. Her mother cries a lot on this.

=== Episode - 21 ===
Airing date	Episode name	Writer	Director	Producer	Cast
19 March 2017	Aap Koun? (آپ کون ); lit: Who are you?	Bee Gul	Angeline Malik	Angelic Films	Sarmad Khoosat, Iffat Rahim

The story is of Iffat (Iffat Rahim) and Sarmad (Sarmad Khoosat) exercising together. He comes to see her home and are proved to be good friends. She tells him to tell his secrets but he says that he has told all his secrets to her and there is no more to say. She says that she knows that he is in love with straight-off hair girl, whom she always scares him. When it comes to eating, he says him to give him zahr for eating. She says him that zahr could be eaten by him when he was with that girl and she had seen him doing this but he always prevents this truth and says that he had left her after that day she had seen her with him and then he had never seen her face or met her. She says him that her goal was to cut our ways but she didn't succeed. She finds some things but acts as she has something another but he identifies that she is finding a plate! They take a dinner. She says that she has brought food from the restaurant next to her home. He tells her that because she had seen him with girl, she is doing this and says that she had also married with also uneducated producer but he later apologizes to her for criticizing her husband. He asks her that if she wants to meet him and asks her to give her number. She says him 03 and then again says 03 but later forgets her number. Sarmad thinks that she doesn't want to meet him, that's why she is doing this and goes later. On next day, she finds her shoes. She finds them in fridge and does deep thinking that how they came there. When it comes to eating, she sees wrong ingredients in her food and again does deep thinking. She stands in mirror and sees her face. She finds no beauty, she applies purple makeup, she rubs it with tissue and then applies red makeup. Sarmad rings bell and she goes to take him. He tells her that she likes no hair people more otherwise she would not leave him and marry Yasin, producer. She makes tea for him, he takes. While, she says him that why has he not married up to now but he tells her that when they met last time, she shocked him by saying that she is about to marry Yasin but they didn't. Then he tells her that that girl was sleeping with him whole night and she had seen him. But he told her that it was a planning to only jealous her. Her hand burns when she takes tea. While, he tells her that they had wasted their important time, when they were to marry. SHe washes dishes, and he also helps her. Sarmad doesn't find key of his house, so he finds it. Iffat finds key in fridge, she thinks that shoes in fridge was done by Sarmad. Sarmad comes and tells her that she had done this only for this purpose so that he couldn't go home. He goes home later. Doctor comes and she complains her that she always forgets what she has done and often does what she has not to do. Doctor asks her date of birth, address, color of clothes, etc. She forgets herself and says where is she? It is proved that she has Alzheimer's disease. Sarmad comes to her and she says to him that she forgets everything except him, she revises all detail of his information. He advises her to eat baadam and tells her that she should keep servant for her and she does it. Her servant fulfills all her duties to help Iffat. She helps her in most of works like eating, etc. Sarmad calls her princess and comes and tells her that she had missed her a lot, she smiles but then she asks her who is he?

=== Episode - 22 ===
Airing date	Episode name	Writer	Director	Producer	Cast
26 March 2017	Intezaam (انتظام); lit: Arrangement	Abeer Mehr	Angeline Malik	Angelic Films	Ahmad Zeb, Nausheen Shah, Lubna Aslam, Almas Fidai

The story revolves around two sisters who are living with their aunt (Lubna Aslam) after their parents' death. Elder sister Raheela (Nausheen Shah) teaches car driving and the younger sister Aaliya (Almas) is finding for job. Their aunt is diagnosed with dialysis and both sisters have difficulties because of their aunt's weekly checkups. One day, Aaliya applies for her job at an office which turns out to be his college friend Faisal's (Ahmad Zeb). Faisal likes Aaliya from their college time. Aaliya has a pick-and-drop problem and gets always late on the buses. On a day, Faisal drops Aaliya and convinces her that he can regularly drop her to which she agrees. Raheela is engaged to Waleed who doesn't allow her to do job. Raheela is not satisfied with Aaliya's pick-and-drop arrangement. Soon, Raheela brakes her engagement with Waleed because of this. Aaliya's colleagues start backbiting, picturing Aaliya and Faisal's relationship an affair and favourism. The day comes when Aaliya refuses Faisal to pick and drop her, claiming her conveyance is arranged. One of Aaliya's colleagues sees Aaliya with a boy on a bike. The boy's face is covered with a helmet. Faisal overheads his employers talking about Aaliya's new pick-and-drop arrangement as he was to marry Aaliya. Soon Faisal also see Aaliya with that boy and so his mother. Faisal quarries Aaliya, getting a blank answer. Faisal gets hurt. The helmet boy turns out to be Raheela, Aaliya's new conveyance arrangement.

=== Episode - 23 ===
Airing date	Episode name	Writer	Director	Producer	Cast
2 April 2017	Hadi Ki Heroine (ھادی کی هیروئن); lit: Hadi's heroine	Amna Ahmad	Angeline Malik	Angelic Films	Uroosa Siddiqui, Ismat Zaidi, Umar Farooq

The story revolves around girl, Laila (Uroosa Siddiqui) watching Laaj on T.V. and seeing it with naked eyes continuously. Her mother (Ismat Zaidi) says her that driver will come and gives her breakfast. But she sees continuously, driver comes and her mother closes T.V. She says her why she did this and goes. While returning from college, she gets collided with a guy, Hadi (Umar Farooq) who says her to go carefully but she sees him continuously and falls in love with him and says him that he can also go carefully and goes with smile. He follows her on can with bike and gets meet up in coffee shop and says her to give him her number and she gives him and happily goes. She gets her mother and her mother says that she has bought a new clothes for her and she gets over egoistic with it. Her brother comes and says her that that's not a way of talking with a mother. She keeps seeing come and smiles. Her brother comes and says where is Laila but she says that she is watching drama carefully. She comes with a happy smile and says that she is too happy today. While Hadi calls her by phone and she goes to him downstairs. At there, she says him that this heart loves him and goes to home with a sweet smile. While, her colleague friend said her that she has met with him before 2 years and she is now fell in love with him and that's not right. While, Had messages her half an hour ago before in class. Her teacher listens their conversation and says Laila to go out of class. As she wanted, she thanks her and goes to call him and says him that she cannot come but he insists her so she comes there in uniform. Hadi says her that why she has come in uniform and beats her in hand. Her friend comes her home the next day, and says her that she should leave him and no to go there again and again but she does it. Her TV Burns next days and she takes remote from her brother. She calls her friend and says her if she had watched today's episode of Hadi but she says her that tomorrow is mathematics paper and she is about to watch dramas and her friend says her that Hadi is about to marry where she becomes overjoyed from this and fells into bed with enthusiasm. While, her brother and mother decide to marry Yasir with Laila. Laila listens it from them and messages to Hadi that she will meet with him the college day. She meets him that day and forgets the geometry in car. Her brother gives her but OMG! he sees her with a guy, and takes her with him leaving her exam of maths. On the wedding day, she asks from her friend what happened in yesterday's episode. Her friends tells her and she copies the same and goes away with that guy. He says her to come in her home but she refuses it and goes and says him to stop her marriage which is tomorrow. She comes in her home and says her mother that she will watch the drama for 5 minutes. Her mother accepts it. Again she follows the drama that a girl cuts her vein and waits for Hadi but he doesn't come and he was sitting with another girl and she waits every moment for him.

=== Episode - 24 ===
Airing date	Episode name	Writer	Director	Producer	Cast
9 April 2017	Gar Hasti (گارحستی); lit: Settling down	Ibn-e-Aas	Kaleem I. Khan	Angelic Films	Maria Wasti, Noman Masood, Kiran Tabeer, Manan Hameed

The story revolves around Mariam (Maria Wasti) and Humayun (Nauman Masood) talking about that they will be developed soon. She wants to get her own home. They both live in same home but are disappointed to live there. He gives her a salary and she becomes happy. On next month, he says her that he may not get salary because it's sometimes there becomes late. She sure him that he should try. He works in office where (Kiran Tabeer) also works. She starts loving him. They both know there were in love before. She says him that he should now decorate their love. While she asks him that there love was destroyed and says that she can't believe that it was his life marriage with Mariam. He says her that life has changed like waking up for office, taking coffee. He says him that it was his love marriage with Mariam and she says him that he had loved him. Mariam calls him and says him to come to home and not to but anything more. That another girl says him that he should tell her that they were on live with each other. Hina (Kiran Tabeer) says him that after that they will marry each other and sell apartment to do a good business. While Mariam says Humayun that if she bring food for him but he says her no and says him that he has for salary for office. She says him that then why is he sad but he doesn't reply and says her to bring tea for him. On night, she calculates his salary and he says her that Hina wants to marry him and he may be. She, crying, says him that it is his own wish to whether marry her or not and it's not her problem. While Mariam says Humayun to bring Hina to home only so he can see her and he should not give her dhoka. He should do whatever she says to him and he has not to give divorce to her and so both we together. While, he says her that he is happy that she is coming to life soon but on plus he has sadness that he will leave her alone. He says to Mariam that he had said her to come on their home. She cries but wears red colored dress for Hina. she greets her warmly and becomes her maizbaan. She gives her more food but she amuses. Hina says him that she wants to sacrifice her love because his wife loves him and she doesn't want to be their obstacle. While, Mariam says her that he has left home for them whenever they want to live they can.

=== Episode - 25 ===
Airing date	Episode name	Writer	Director	Producer	Cast
16 April 2017	Raaz (راز); lit: Secret	Khalid Ahmed	Raza Musawi	Angelic Films	Ushna Shah, Feroze Khan, Ahmad Ali Akbar

The story is of Ahmer (Ahmad Ali) and Sarah (Ushna Shah), a happily married couples. Their family include Ahmer's friend Arslan (Feroze Khan) who often spends time with both of them on a restaurant. Arslan and Sarah were the partners for specific time until Arslan refused to marry her as now she is married to his friend and Ahmer knows it. Sarah makes such conditions so that Ahmer can realize that Arslan loves her still. They end up meeting in a restaurant as Sarah says that someone is blackmailing her and needs Arslan help.Ahmer calls both of them but they don't pick up the call. Ahmer thinks Sarah and Arslan have an affair.Arslan says that he would have never refused to marry her but doesn't love her. But whenever she needs any type of help, Arslan comes to help her. But she loves both, making sure that Ahmer should never think that she hates him. At last, she calls Arslan in grief asking for help again as the blackmailer had made huge demands. When he comes and asks her what happened with her while touching her shoulders, Ahmer comes there and thinks that Arslan is forcing Sara. He throws that snow covered ball given by Arslan to Sarah and he eventually dies because of injury. Ahmer hugs Sarah and she stares at the camera. Sarah took revenge on Arslan as he had rejected her for marriage.

=== Episode - 26 ===
Airing date	Episode name	Writer	Director	Producer	Cast
23 April 2017	Aadhi Ghar Wali (آدھی گھر والی ); lit: Half a Housewife	Adeel Razzaq	Angeline Malik	Angelic Films	Hira Salman, Imran Ashraf, Anam Tanveer

The sorry is of married couple of Kashif (Imran Ashraf) and Sab (Anam Tanveer). Saba younger sister Sana (Hira Salman) comes from Hyderabad to her home as she is pregnant. When Kashif takes her, his heart falls on her and starts loving her and she doesn't know this fact. He does extra things for her and also proposes her but she makes Saba unaware of it. Saba follows Kashif and he touches Sana but she tried to stab him but he goes from there and Saba see them both. While Sana tells whole truth to Saba, thinks to get Sana back to home and tells him and he becomes upset and tries to take Saba's life. When she sleeps, he takes a pillow and put it on her face and pushes very hard and she dies. He becomes extremely shocked to see Saba coming from outside. They both cries to recognise a dead Sana.

=== Episode - 27 ===
Airing date	Episode name	Writer	Director	Producer	Cast
30 April 2017	Khilona (کھلونا); lit: Toy	Saji Gul	Angeline Malik	Angelic Films	Arisha Razi, Arshiya Akbar, Adnan Shah Tipu, Farhan Ali Agha, Shifa Akbar, Wardah Javed

The story starts with Guddi (Arshiya Akbar) taking the doll forcibly from her sister (Shifa Akbar) and it breaks. Her mother says her that why did she break the doll. Hey mother is very egoistic and she says her that she will call her father what her mother did with her. Her father Ghulam Muhammad (Adnan Shah Tipu) comes and she says him that she is upset because get mother had annoyed her a lot. When she sleeps, she is unable to sleep. Her mother cries that get daughter is about to go with her father but get father says her that she had always wanted that she should not shy. He says her that the Mian Sahab (to where they go) are great than them that all furnitures comes from his money. They cry again once they reach there. It is the home of (Farhan Ali Agha) and his daughter (Arisha Razi). He comes from a Jeep and says Guddi to greet her. She also greets him and G. Muhammad says him to lend his daughter to go with him because she will not be able to do a long journey. He lets G. Muhammad get back and he sits with Guddi. Her tells her about his and her father's friendship. When she comes there, she finds some toys there. A servant says her that Baby (Arisha Razi) it calling her. She is very egoistic towards her. She says get to give her a clutch but she tells that we don't call it clutch, she becomes more angry and says her servant to not let Guddi's face to be seen again. While Mian says to servant to let her daughter go because she is also paralysed. While Guddi says to Mian Sahab that out of not her mistake because she didn't do anything. Mian Sahab says her that he knows that his daughter is a real culprit. While sleeping, Adul (servant) says her that she actually had polio which destroyed her life and all are sorry for her. Will get neighbors play, the plate is thrown to her. While sheet suffers with her, being a polio a, she plays with him by throwing her a book again and again. While, because of that, she becomes unconscious. Her father says her that good sure feels k now but she says she is right. Her father says her to go village return but she says that she doesn't want to go. Baby's father says her that she became in unconscious all because of hey but she says that it was not sacrifice. The next day, she dreams bad once again, but Guddi relaxes her. While, Guddi sings a song as shown in TV. While Mian Sahab says her that he has decided that Baby and Guddi to go school together. But tragedies happen that G. Muhammad is killed by police how besides that she loves with Baby. While painting, Baby says Guddi to bring all but she brings picture instead and asks her who she is and she says her that she is her mother (saying angrily) and throws her. She becomes unconscious. Her mother serves her not to go there but in night, she again goes there saying Mian Sahab that she again wants to work with his daughter and he recteneuly agrees.

=== Episode - 28 ===
Airing date	Episode name	Writer	Director	Producer	Cast
7 May 2017	Shak (شک); lit: Doubt	Mehreen Shaikh	Angeline Malik	Angelic Films	Hina Khawaja Bayat, Saife Hassan, Hammad Farooqui, Amna Malik

The story starts with Rehana (Hina Khawaja Bayat) cutting eggs and making food for Arslan (Hammad Farooqui). He says that he will not eat breakfast unless she does with him. Her husband Ejaz (Saife Hassan) comes and gives her surprise that he has come here with elimination of job. She says him that if he could tell in advance, Arslan could pick him but he says that by seeing him, his face is like washed out. She says that it isn't a thing. He goes. Arslan says his mother that she knows better that what has happened in past 10 years. While, his mother applies make-up, her husband comes and says her why she is preparing but she says that because of she is happy that he has come. He says her that she is shameless and so she is doing it in front of her younger son. He asks her when her son will come, she says 11:00pm but he says her that it is very late and when he comes, he beats her. While, he says Arslan that now that will happen whatever has happened in past 10 years and because of his fight, he says him that he doesn't know how to talk with a father. While, at night, her hisband wakes up, a letter comes and he thinks that she is having an affair. He shouts at her but she says him that letter has come but he now should receive. While, at morning, he says his son (Arslan) to leave home to which he angrily agrees. He says his mother that it is better to live in an orphanage than this home. His mother tries to convince him but he says her that she should not worry, he will be safe. While, Rehana applauds another guy, her husband takes her and says her why she does so but she says that he has no fault but he says her that she supports him. While, her husband's colleague Romeela (Amna Malik) comes and says her that he was in love with her in front of her and her son and says that all people had famous been done that they are about to marry but says that she had loved her cousin and they were about to marry otherwise she could replace her and says that she thinks that this decision wasn't good enough. Her son comes when she goes and says her that why she was silent. While, his mother says she has girl for him. But he says that he will not marry until she settles. While, door bell rings and Rehana comes. Her husband beats her and says that why not her son does and fights with him. Her husband says her that he is going and so she should lock. When she goes, he hides himself behind sofa. She scares when she sees him and locks herself in room. He comes to her room & knowingly asks her what has happened but she doesn't accept it. Her son says her that he is sure that he was his father. He goes to him and says that he should take care of him. He says that he has no any sadness for what he do. While, Ejaz says her that she should eat pills of sleeping and then sleep. Angrily, he says his father that he will take his mother so far soon and if he tried to stop him, he will shoot first him, then his father and then himself. In home, he gets watch and mobile, he thinks that his mother really loves another guy, so she is doing it. He shouts that Ejaz had done good doubt on her, she is doing it but someone comes from room, he guesses him his maternal uncle and all luggage was his. While, his mother comes and in front of Ejaz, she says that he had transferred doubt on his son so he does it. She says that all reasons of her living have been ended and now she will go.

=== Episode - 29 ===
Airing date	Episode name	Writer	Director	Producer	Cast
14 May 2017	Mehru Aur Maa (مہرو اور ماں); lit: Mehru and Mother	Abeer Mehr	Angeline Malik	Angelic Films	Seemi Raheel, Daniyal Raheel, Iffat Rahim, Iqra Butt

Mehru (Iffat Rahim) drives car and call comes from her mother that someone has come. When she reaches, she finds a guy Jameel (Daniyal Raheel), who knows his aunt, whom he guesses to be friend of his aunt. She says that she is. Her mother sleeps and she comes saying that why is she sleeping. She says her that Sohail does flud with her. She says that he is much younger than her so how can he do. She says her mother to sleep and she does it. Her servant says her that she should call Jameel in this thing that he has forgot his watch here. She shies to call him and he sends her messages and she smiles. He comes in morning, saying that he has come here for mother. While, Mishi (servant) says her mother that it's exercise time. She says that she thought that it's breakfast time but goes. Jameel tells her that he had come here before 5 years. She says that he can. He asks her if there is someone in house but she says her that some are in India, USA and UK. He says that he is also from India and she says that yes because her friend was from there. He goes. She prepares for going somewhere to buy clothes, and he comes and they both go. He asks her that if she is married but she says her that she has not married and has no boyfriend, and says that "WE ARE ALWAYS SINGLE". While at home, Mishi asks her that today is her marriage and so she if give her dress. She says that if she has thought that she will not give, she is wrong. While, her mother says her that because of she was not married, she had come in her home and wants to go after she marries soon. While, she talks with Jameel and call comes that doctor has checked her mother recently. Mehru comes and says her that doctor has said that she has multiple issues. She says that this happens most with mothers. While, her mother tells Mishi about her and Mehru's relation and their childhood stories. While, Jameel tells Mehru that he wants to marry her. She asks him if he is mad but he says he is not and world cares of not and relation can be made. While, her mother says her that she should marry anyone because she also left her parents in Bombay and now she has to also leave it. Mehru says her that she will never leave this home. While at night, Jameel comes and says her that she should marry him and shift to America because all love to live there. She says that she want to die here and don't want to go anywhere. Her mother listens it. He says her that she will have repentance in her decision if she will not go with him in tomorrow's flight. She says that she is already repented and he goes. Her mother listens it and sleeps and dies in that night. Mehru comes and says that why she hasn't woke up yet but she is died. She cries and shouts a lot.

=== Episode - 30 ===
Airing date	Episode name	Writer	Director	Producer	Cast
21 May 2017	Sirf Dost (صرف دوست); lit: Only friend	Hamra Khaleeq	Angeline Malik	Angelic Films	Kaif Ghaznavi, Asif Raza Mir, Parveen Akbar

Atif (Asif Raza Mir) takes Naina (Kaif Ghaznavi) in many rides and enjoys her thinking that she is his only girlfriend and her mother (Parveen Akbar) knows this fact. One day, he takes her and she becomes bored, so she says him to let her go home. He again comes to meet her when her mother goes with her friend. He starts romance and says her that she should keep open hair because it suits on her. When she touches him, he goes. He calls her again and says her that he will come again but she angries because he comes usually. He comes in evening, says her that he lets her go but today he has only come today but she makes lame excuses to get rid of him. He comes next time and takes her and this time she goes. He asks her there that what she does in leisure time, she says that nothing but caring. He calls again to her in home and talks her. He comes next time and she says that her mother is ill since morning and Atif decides to rest there. He asks her if he can live today here but she says that he would have sorrow living here but he says that he can manage it and again asks her if she goes with him outside but she refuses. Next time, he brings scooter and says that car is not working so he has brought scooter of his friend. She aks her that he should get her into hotel where he refuses her to go otherwise he should get her to home and he accepts to let her go home. Next time, he asks her to visit artist but she refuses. Next time, he says her to take her hotel and she excites by it. She makes her fashion lipstick, and eyebrows. He takes her to room and says that she may have expression of love for him. He says her that from window moon and its shades are shown. She says him that he should not love her and he also says that he had a wish for a girlfriend and no any girlfriend used to give him lift and now she also. He apologizes her and says her that he had destroyed her time, and now he is ready to get her to home. She is looked sad on this.

=== Episode - 31 ===
Airing date	Episode name	Writer	Director	Producer	Cast
9 July 2017	Wheel Chair (وہیل چیئر); lit: Wheel chair	Hassam Imam	Angeline Malik	Angelic Films	Omair Rana, Uzma Hassan, Raheed Muhammad Alam

The story is of Nadia (Uzma Hassan) and Sikander (Omair Rana)'s marriage. Sikander is paralyzed walking into wheelchair. Their student (Raheed Muhammad Alam) usually comes in their gone for assistance. Nadia goes for office and comes with him. Once, he touches her while buying milk. She becomes more afraid and her husband asks her and she tells her the reality. Her husband thinks she is still hiding something. She buys shirt for the student, whom she loves secretly. She hides this until he tells her husband. He becomes more angry on Nadia that what she did. She says that if she bought one shirt for him then what happens but he said it affects him as his wife buys gifts for other guy. He decides to divorce her and she happily goes with that student and Sikander walks without wheelchair.

=== Episode - 32 ===
Airing date	Episode name	Writer	Director	Producer	Cast
16 July 2017	Mehmaan (مہمان); lit: Guest	Rudain Shah	Angeline Malik	Angelic Films	Noor Bukhari, Shamil Khan, Faris Shafi

Maham (Noor Bukhari) is married to Faisal (Faris Shafi) and they have a son, Bilal. Maham was infertile but she still had a son who is actually Fahad (Shamil Khan)'s son. Fahad is Faisal's friend and he often comes to their house. He mentally tortures Maham and ask her to do what she did years ago. Faisal also knows she is infertile but doesn't know that Bilal is not his son. Maham's behavior towards Fahad is awkward. She says to Fahad that if he try to does anything to her than she will tell Faisal. The night before leaving, Fahad last time ask her to come to her room. She asks Faisal that what will he do if she divides her love between him and another person. He says that he will kill both, Maham and that person. When Faisal sleeps, she goes to balcony to meet Fahad. He asks that what is her decision. She says to kill him and pushes him and he dies. Faisal sees her near Fahad. Maham then goes to Faisal and asks him to forgive her as she lied to her that Bilal is not his but Fahad's son. He says that he knows that and wanted to keep it a secret and tells her that it was not Maham who was infertile but him.

=== Episode - 33 ===
Airing date	Episode name	Writer	Director	Producer	Cast
23 July 2017	Akele Do (اکیلےدو); lit: Lonely two	Abeer Mehr	Angeline Malik	Angelic Films	Farhan Ally Agha, Sawera Nadeem

Jameel (Farhan Ally Agha) is a police officer and is very stonehearted and don't even like children. Her wife, Meena (Sawera Nadeem) is kind hearted, and is housewife. She likes children. Jameel doesn't want children of their own but Meena wants. They don't have any children because of Jameel. Meena is living with Jameel for years in hope that he will agree one day. One day, Meena asks him to come home early so they can dinner together. He comes early and says that he is married to another woman and she is pregnant. He asks her to leave his home. She says no. He says I will give you divorce. She immediately hits him with a Goat's "Raan" in his head which she was cooking. He hits her many times with it. She goes to her neighbour, Farida and asks her to go with her as she is making Raan and wants her to give her recipe. Farida is shocked to see Jameel's dead body. She tells Meena and she calls ambulance. He is declared dead. Police doubts Meena but Farida and other police officers say that Meena is not that type of woman. She asks police officers to eat Raan as she made it for Jameel and she will feel bad as when Jameel was alive, he always take care of his guests, but when she sees this Raan, she will remember Jameel. Police officers eats it not knowing that it's the murder weapon. Police officers thinks that maybe the killer took murder weapon with him. Meena after the police goes, happily plays the violin.

=== Episode - 34 ===
Airing date	Episode name	Writer	Director	Producer	Cast
30 July 2017	Socha Na Tha (سوچا نہ تھا); lit: Did not think of it		Angeline Malik	Angelic Films	Imran Ashraf, Saboor Ali, Sara Razi, Gul-e-Rana

The story of bus driver (Imran Ashraf) who falls in love with passenger (Saboor Ali). He forcibly marries her but as he takes her to home, she picks up her hand saying he did right to let her get out from that house, she always wanted to become independent.

=== Episode - 35 ===
Airing date	Episode name	Writer	Director	Producer	Cast
6 August 2017	Sarab (سراب); lit: Mirage		Angeline Malik	Angelic Films	Ramsha Khan, Laila Wasti, Tipu Sharif

The story of Masooma (Ramsha Khan) working as a teacher along with Wafa (Laila Wasti). Masooma likes Fawad (Tipu Sharif) because they both liked each other on Facebook. Wafa always has a wallet in which Rustam if written. When they (Masooma and Fawad) are about to marry, Masooma sees same wallet of Rustam name on Fawad's hand to which she is shocked, hence what she assumed was her mirage.

=== Episode - 36 ===
Airing date	Episode name	Writer	Director	Producer	Cast
13 August 2017	Tuf Hai Tum Par (تف حے تم پر); lit	Amna Ahmad	Angeline Malik	Angelic Films	Kamran Jeelani, Faryal Mehmood, Yasra Rizvi

The story of a married couple, (Kamran Jeelani) and (Yasra Rizvi). She is the most funny but tries to keep her husband at any instant. While, her cousin Natasha (Faryal Mehmood) comes from abroad to meet them. Eventually they both fall in love but try to keep that secret. When she caught them both together, they refused out saying that they were just preparing for Natasha's farewell.

=== Episode - 37 ===
Airing date	Episode name	Writer	Director	Producer	Cast
20 August 2017	Khat (خط); lit: Letter	Shahid Nizami	Angeline Malik	Angelic Films	Muneeb Butt, Tooba Siddiqui, Tutu Baba

Arsalan is a young man who, along with his younger sister returns from abroad to his childhood home. A man who was a friend of Arsalan's late grandfather warmly greets them and remarks that Arsalan looks exactly like his grandfather. Arsalan's sister chooses a room for herself while Arsalan decides on his grandfatheepr's room. On his first night in the room, he finds a letter lying by his door. He reads it. It is addressed to Arsalan and is sent by a woman called Farhana. Farhana writes that she has seen Arsalan and fallen in love with him. She had written a lot of letters for him but she never had the courage to post any of them, this is the first letter she is actually posting. She writes a lot about the fanstasy of love which makes Arsalan smile and he writes her a love letter in reply. Farhana sends her another letter with her picture and Arsalan really likes her. He also sends her his picture with a letter. Scenes of Farhana are shown to the viewers as a beautiful woman living in a beautiful room. The process of sending and receiving continues but Arsalan asks Farhana for her phone number. Farhana replies that her father has not connected a phone to the house yet but he will soon. Arsalan also wonders why Farhana always writes '64 on her letter but he does not ask her. Arsalan's sister makes fun of him that in this age of e-mails and social media, Arsalan awaits letters. Farhana tells Arsalan that she is visiting Karachi. Along with her father and sister. She tells him that she will find some way of visiting him. Asalan keeps waiting for her. Arsalan finds this weird and talks to the friend of his grandfather who tells Arsalan that Arsalan's grandfather's pen name was Arsalan and he looked exactly like Arsalan.

== Production ==
=== Filming ===
Angeline Malik chose a random cast for each episode for the drama. The cinematography was done by Mehmood Mirza and the cameraman is Asim Ali Chand. The background score is done by Shalim Zaader and the editing head is Asif Asad while the senior editor is Qaiser Ramzan. The editors are Salman Mani and Irtaza Rizvi. The production manager is Affan Malik while its line producer is Manzoor Ali. Wardrobe (video) is done by Deepak Perwani.

== Criticism ==
PEMRA issued a notice to Hum TV because of its controversial content on its 14th episode, "Chewing Gum". It contained content of homosexuality, which is an inappropriate topic in the country.

== See also ==
- List of programs broadcast by Hum TV
- 2016 in Pakistani television
