= Raqeeb Se =

2021 Pakistani drama TV serial

- Original title: رقیب سے
- Genre: Romance; Drama
- Written by: Bee Gul
- Directed by: Kashif Nisar
- Starring: Hadiqa Kiani; Nauman Ijaz; Sania Saeed; Iqra Aziz; Faryal Mehmood; Hassan Mir
- Opening theme: "Raqeeb Se" by Hadiqa Kiani
- Country of origin: Pakistan
- Original languages: Urdu; Punjabi
- No. of episodes: 23

Production
- Producer: Momina Duraid
- Production location: Lahore, Pakistan
- Running time: approx. 35-40 minutes
- Production company: MD Productions

Original release
- Network: Hum TV
- Release: 20 January – 26 May 2021

Raqeeb Se (transl. almost rivals(in love)) is a Pakistani romantic drama television series produced by Momina Duraid, written by Bee Gul and directed by Kashif Nisar. It aired on Hum TV from 20 January 2021 to 26 May 2021 all under MD Productions. Raqeeb Se revolves around the repercussions of a love story stretched around one's entire life. It features an ensemble cast of Hadiqa Kiani, Nauman Ijaz, Sania Saeed, Iqra Aziz, Faryal Mehmood, Hassan Mir and Saqib Sumeer. The title is adopted from Faiz Ahmad Faiz's nazm of the same name.

The series received critical acclaim due to its story line and performances of the cast. At 21st Lux Style Awards, it got most number of nominations, and won Best TV Director and two awards for Kiani; Best Emerging Talent in TV and Best TV Actress-Critics' choice.

== Plot ==
The television series is centered around four women and the men around them. Sakina takes her daughter Ameera and flees from her abusive husband Rafiq. She seeks shelter at her former lover, Maqsood Sahab's house and their love story is so tragic and interesting that his wife, Hajra and daughter, Insha, know it by heart.

Hajra consoles Sakina and takes care of her and Ameera while Insha considers them putting up at her house an injustice to her mother.

== Cast ==
- Hadiqa Kiani as Sakina: Rafiq's ex-wife; Ameera's mother; Maqsood's former lover
- Nauman Ejaz as Maqsood Ahmad: Hajra's husband; Insha's step-father; Masood and Mansoor's brother; Sakina's former lover
- Sania Saeed as Hajra Maqsood: Maqsood's wife; Insha's mother
- Iqra Aziz as Ameera Ali: Rafiq and Sakina's daughter; Kashif's love interest
- Faryal Mehmood as Insha Maqsood: Hajra's daughter; Maqsood's step-daughter; Abdul's ex-wife
- Saqib Sameer as Rafiq Ali: Sakina's ex-husband; Ameera's father
- Hamza Sohail as Mohammad Abdul Rahman: Insha's ex-husband
- Salman Shahid as Masood Ahmad: Maqsood's elder brother; Aatka's husband; Kashif's father
- Saba Faisal as Aatka Bashir: Masood's wife; Kashif's mother
- Hassan Mir as Kashif Masood: Masood and Aatka's son; Ameera's love interest (Dead)
- Ismat Iqbal as Maasi Anaraan: Sakina and Rafiq's neighbor

== Music ==
Raqeeb Se – OST

Soundtrack album by Hadiqa Kiani
- Released: 12 January 2021
- Recorded: 2020
- Genre: Television soundtrack
- Length: 04 Minutes 55 Seconds (4:55)
- Language: Urdu
- Label: M.D Productions
- Producer: Ustad Baqir Abbas

Music video
- "Raqeeb Se" OST on YouTube

The title song of Raqeeb Se is composed and performed by Hadiqa Kiani who played one of the lead role in the serial, while lyrics were penned by her mother Khawar Kiani, was originally a poem of her. The soundtrack was produced by Ustad Baqir Abbas. It marks the return of the singer to the channel, since she performed the OST of channel's hit drama series Yaqeen Ka Safar in 2016.

=== Track listing ===
All lyrics are written by Khawar Kiani; all music is composed by Hadiqa Kiani.

No.	Title	Artist(s)	Length
1.	"Raqeeb Se"	Hadiqa Kiani	4:55

== Production ==
=== Background and development ===
In September 2020, screenwriter Bee Gul shared the details of her upcoming project, Raqeeb Se, directed by Kashif Nisar. Gul stated that to avoid the manipulation and exploitation of the social issues due to the misrepresentation, she chose to focus on a more meaningful narrative, leading her to write Raqeeb Se. She originally conceived the pre-partition Karachi as the setting of the series; however, it was then changed to Lahore's setting of contemporary times. It was the second collaboration of Nisar and Gul since Dar Si Jaati Hai Sila (2017).

=== Casting ===
Singer and vocalist Hadiqa Kiani was selected to portray Sakina, marking her acting debut. Besides acting, Kiani also performed and composed the soundtrack of the series. Her casting was confirmed in September 2020. After pursuing by Sultana Siddiqui and Momina Duraid, Kiani was approached by Duraid to play the role. For the preparation of the character, Kiani used to dress in Shalwar kameez in her daily routine, as her character's appearance. Veteran actors Naumaan Ijaz and Sania Saeed were selected to portray the roles of Maqsood and Hajra; previously acted together in Jhumka Jaan (2009), Khamoshiyan (2010), Aao Kahani Buntay Hain (2011) and Sang-e-Mar Mar (2016). Young actors Iqra Aziz, Faryal Mehmood and Hamza Sohail, son of veteran actor and comedian Sohail Ahmed, were cast in prominent roles. Aziz confirmed her involvement in September 2021 through her Instagram handle. Sohail was selected to portray Abdul Rahman in the series after meeting Nisar, when he auditioned multiple times, making his acting debut in 2021. Theatre actor Saqib Sumeer was selected to portray Rafique Ali, a role originally intended for Sohail Ahmed, who was unavailable. Likewise, Saba Faisal and Salman Shahid were cast in supporting roles.

=== Principal photography ===
Principal photography for the series began in mid-2020 in Lahore, and almost half of the work was completed by October 2020.

== Reception ==
The series received critical acclaim due to performances and story line. Hrithik Sharma of El Viaje Reviews included it into his select list of "Pakistani Gems" and says that "Raqeeb Se is a masterfully written show powered by extraordinary performances, meticulous direction, and euphonious background score". He adds, "The performances are breathtaking. Especially of the three principal characters. Maqsud Saab, played by Nauman Ijaaz brings in exactly the right amounts of charm and helplessness. Hajra, played by Sania Saeed, keeps you wondering whether she is too good to be true, or is she actually happily devoted to Maqsud and Sakeena’s love story. And then, my personal favorite, Hadiqa Kiyani, who towers over every scene and magically dominates every frame that she is part of".

A reviewer from The News International lauded the series for its female portrayal due the multi-faceted and complex female characters. While writing for the same newspaper, Gaitee Ara Siddiqi praised the script of the series and performances particularly of Ijaz, Sumeer and Kiani but stated that Kiani's acting has become repetitive and monotonous after some episodes. In another article published in March 2023, Siddiqi praised the Saeed's character for being "nuanced" and praised the series stating, "another recent top-notch production that explores the complexities and intricacies of relationships without stereotyping them".

== Awards and nominations ==
Year	Awards	Category	Recipient	Result	Ref.
24 September 2022	Hum Awards	Best Drama Serial – Popular	Momina Duraid	Nominated	
24 September 2022	Hum Awards	Best Actress – Popular	Hadiqa Kiani	Nominated	
24 September 2022	Hum Awards	Best Actress – Popular	Iqra Aziz	Nominated	
24 September 2022	Hum Awards	Best Actress – Jury	Iqra Aziz	Won	
24 September 2022	Hum Awards	Best Actor – Popular	Nauman Ijaz	Nominated	
24 September 2022	Hum Awards	Most Impactful Character	Sania Saeed	Won	
24 September 2022	Hum Awards	Best Original Soundtrack	Momina Duraid and Hadiqa Kiani	Nominated	
24 November 2022	Lux Style Awards	Best TV Director	Kashif Nisar	Won	
24 November 2022	Lux Style Awards	Best TV Writer	Bee Gul	Nominated	
24 November 2022	Lux Style Awards	Best TV Actor-Critics' Choice	Nauman Ijaz	Nominated	
24 November 2022	Lux Style Awards	Best TV Actress-Critics' Choice	Iqra Aziz	Nominated	
24 November 2022	Lux Style Awards	Best TV Actress-Critics' Choice	Hadiqa Kiani	Won	
24 November 2022	Lux Style Awards	Best Emerging Talent in TV	Hadiqa Kiani	Won	
24 November 2022	Lux Style Awards	Best Ensemble TV Play	Raqeeb Se	Nominated	
