= Pehchaan (2014 TV series) =

Pakistani television drama series

- Written by: Bee Gul
- Directed by: Khalid Ahmed
- Starring: Alishba Yousuf; Sohail Sameer; Iffat Rahim
- Theme music composer: Arshad Mahmood
- Opening theme: Erum Nafees
- Country of origin: Pakistan
- Original language: Urdu
- No. of episodes: 20

Production
- Executive producer: Noorul Huda Shah
- Producers: Seema Razi; Raziuddin Ahmed
- Cinematography: Naveed Malik

Original release
- Network: A-Plus TV
- Release: 17 April – 4 September 2014

Pehchaan (Urdu: پہچان, lit. 'Identity') is a Pakistani television drama serial that aired on A-Plus TV from 17 April 2014 to 4 September 2014. It was written by Bee Gul and directed by Khalid Ahmed. It stars Alishba Yousuf, Sohail Sameer and Iffat Rahim in lead roles.

== Plot overview ==
Pehchaan is the narrative of Laila, a praiseworthy young girl having a basic existence with no more prominent assumptions separated from discovering love in her arranged marriage, finds her genuine strength and a solid way of life as an independent woman through the trial of time and relations. Will the society let her discover the equality that she deserves and the love she has consistently yearned for?

== Cast ==
- Alishba Yousuf as Laila
- Sohail Sameer as Mansoor
- Iffat Rahim as Kukoo
- Anita Camphor as Mrs. Khan
- Qazi Wajid as Laila's father
- Parveen Malik as Laila's mother
- Fawad Khan as Khurram
- Faris Khalid as Saadi
- Sumbul Shahid as Kukoo's mother

== Reception ==
Being an artistic serial and having unique storyline, the series received praise from critics. Masala.com said it "an underrated show". Dawn praised the writing and execution of the serial and wrote, "The non-linear script is beautifully handled and the excellent visuals help make Pehchan a serial that is as appealing as it is engaging." The newspaper further adds, "Writer Bee Gul and director Khalid Ahmed, who gave us Talkhian, produced another gem in Pehchaan."
