= Dilara (TV series) =

Pakistani television series

- Written by: Bee Gul
- Directed by: Khalid Ahmed
- Starring: Kinza Razzak; Abid Ali; Usman Butt
- Opening theme: "Ab Khwahish Dunya Kon Karay" by Sanam Marvi
- Country of origin: Pakistan
- Original language: Urdu
- No. of episodes: 30

Production
- Running time: 35-40 minutes per episode

Original release
- Network: Bol Entertainment
- Release: 3 December 2018 – 6 May 2019

Dilara (Urdu: دل آرا) is a 2018 Pakistani television drama series aired on Bol Entertainment, written by Bee Gul and directed by Khalid Ahmed. It features Kinza Razzak in the title role, alongside Abid Ali, Usman Butt and Umer Naru in prominent roles.

The series is a modern-day adaptation of Munshi Premchand's Nirmala.

== Plot ==
Dilara is in love with Mohsin and they are about to marry. Dilara's family is not so rich and her father, Akbar Ali, tries to fulfill the dowry demands of Mohsin's parents. He meets with an accident on road and dies. After his death, Mohsin and his parents disappear and do not try to contact Dilara and her family. One day, her mother (Zehra) calls them where Dilara herself calls off the marriage due to her self-respect. Zehra than marries Dilara to Nawab Salahuddin, a rich Nawab who is 32 years older than Dilara. Dilara goes to Salahuddin's house where he lives with his sister, Khanam and two sons from his previous marriage. Khanam behaves strictly with Dilara while Nawab's sons make fun of her. One day, Nawab's elder son, who is a doctor, reveals to Dilara that Mohsin is his class fellow; Dilara is shocked.

== Cast ==
- Kinza Razzak as Dilara
- Abid Ali as Nawab Salahuddin
- Usman Butt as Nawab Shujauddin
- Ramsha Kohati as Saman
- Umer Naru as Dr. Mohsin
- Hina Khawaja Bayat as Khanam
- Rabya Kulsoom as Choti
- Samina Ahmed as Zehra
- Syed Mohammad Ahmed as Akbar Ali
- Khalid Ahmed as Akbar Ali's elder brother
- Saleem Mairaj as Meeru
