= Khalid Ahmed =

Pakistani actor, producer and director

- Born: Patna, Bihar, India
- Occupations: Director; Producer; Actor; Screenwriter
- Relatives: Imtiaz Ali (nephew)

Khalid Ahmed (Urdu: خالد احمد) is a Pakistani TV director, producer and actor.

He currently teaches theatre at National Academy of Performing Arts.

== Early life and education ==
Born in Patna, Bihar, India, he moved to Pakistan in his teens, during the 1970s, and despite being inclined towards the arts from an early age (he learned to play the banjo and the Hawaiian guitar), he initially graduated as an engineer from the University of California, also teaching the subject for some time at the NED University, Karachi, before studying theater at the London Academy of Music and Dramatic Art.

== Career ==
He has been active in theatre, television and cinema as an actor, director and screenwriter, preferring classical plays and stories.

== Personal life ==
He is married to Sheema Kermani. Through his sister, he is related to Indian film director Imtiaz Ali.

== Selected filmography ==
=== Television serials ===
Year	Title	Role	Director	Producer	Screenwriter	Network	Note
2001	Maya	Mir Mehboob Khan "Mir Saheb"				PTV World	
2010	Uraan	Asjad				Geo Entertainment	
2011	Khandan-e-Shughlia			Yes		ARY Digital	
2010–2011	Chand Pe Dastak	Rasheed				Hum TV	Ramadan special series
2012	Bilqees Kaur	Iqbal Bhatti				Hum TV	
2012	Zindagi Gulzar Hai	Wahab				Hum TV	
2012	Talkhiyaan	Agha Hussain Baig	Yes			Express Entertainment	Based on The God of Small Things by Arundhati Roy
2014	Pehchaan		Yes			A-Plus TV	
2014	Digest Writer	Mazhar Hayat				Hum TV	
2016	Kitni Girhain Baaki Hain				Yes	Hum TV	Wrote episodes 2, 6 and 25
2018	Dilara	Akbar Ali's elder brother	Yes			Bol Entertainment	Modern-day adaptation of Munshi Premchand's 1926 novel Nirmala

=== Films ===
Year	Title	Role	Director
2013	Chambaili		
2016	Actor in Law		
2016	Laloolal.com		Yes
2018	Pinky Memsaab	Qutb	
2022	Intezaar	Daddy	

=== Web series ===
Churails (2020)

=== Stage plays ===
- Badshahat Ka Khatma (written by Saadat Hasan Manto) (2013)
- Naql-e-Makani (written by Rajinder Singh Bedi) (2013)
- Bedroom Conversations (2020)
- Kal Agar Main Marjaun (What If I Die Tomorrow) (2021)

== Awards and nominations ==
Year	Award	Category	Project	Result	Reference
2020	Harlem International Film Festival	Best Actor	Intezaar	Won	

== See also ==
- National Academy of Performing Arts
