= Laloolal.com =

- لالولال ڈاٹ کام
- Directed by: Khalid Ahmed
- Written by: Bee Gul
- Screenplay by: Khalid Ahmed
- Produced by: Shailja Kejriwal; Vikas Sharma
- Starring: Faysal Qureshi; Natasha Portess; Aimen Iqbal; Shabira Channa; Ali Gul Mallah
- Cinematography: Najaf Bilgrami
- Edited by: Irshad Tanoli
- Music by: Waqar Ali
- Production company: Zeal for Unity
- Distributed by: Zee5
- Release date: 2016 (Pakistan)
- Running time: 77 min
- Country: Pakistan
- Language: Urdu

Laloolal.com (Urdu: لالولال ڈاٹ کام) is a 2016 Pakistani romantic–drama film directed by Khalid Ahmed (in his directorial debut), written by Bee Gul and co-produced by Shailja Kejriwal and Vikas Sharma. It premiered in 2016 at the Zeal for Unity festival, aiming at India-Pakistan unity.

== Plot ==
Laloo Lal is the local ‘do-gooder’ or self-styled social worker of a tiny village in Tharparkar. The people of the village love and respect him because he is always out to help them with their day-to-day problems and get their work done. He does all the govt related paperwork right from fetching money order for Mai to attending court, resolving local tiffs and distributing medicines for minor ailments. He is the only person in the village who can speak English, although he has a very limited vocabulary.

There are three people he holds dear in his life, his feisty fiancée Chandan, best friend and confidant Arbab Raheem and a blind old woman he calls Mai. But just when everything in the village is going about like clockwork, a young English woman named Sue appears at the office of the local union council with a plea to help her find her missing husband. This case too, like all tricky affairs, is handed over to Laloo to solve.

Laloo offers to help Sue and takes her to Mai's home. Sue very depressed spends nights crying. She insists Laloo take her along with him, which Laloo refuses as travelling along the desert is a tricky (as they have to change their mode of transport frequently) and arduous task. Chandan initially jealous as well as curious of Sue, starts warming up to her. She makes her do daily chores like fetching water from the well, etc. Initially, Chandan has a very naive idea that since Sue cannot do daily chores (like fetching water, cleaning, cooking) her husband might have left her, later she realises Sue loves her husband as much as she loves Laloo and becomes concerned for her.

Laloo on daily basis spends time enquiring every village of Sue's husband, returning empty-handed each day. One fine day he relents to her request and takes agrees to take her along with him. Chandan dresses Sue into local attire so that she won't attract any undue attention. Later sometime Laloo is able to find the family of Sue's husband. Sue realises that her husband is already married & used her to get a residential visa and job. Distraught they return home. They have to halt at a desert house as it is very late in the night. Sue who is totally distraught finds solace in Laloo's arm. Later they have sex. Next morning Laloo is totally broken because he feels that he can no longer marry Chandan because he has committed adultery. Sue tries to console him telling that he has done nothing wrong and it was just heat of the moment. Later, Sue proposes Laloo to marry her. After some thought, he agrees. He tells everyone that Sue has offered him to take to her country, give him a big job. He would then come with much money and use it to build a hospital, water pipeline, etc. Mai immediately realises that Laloo is lying and he was lying all the while regarding the money orders supposedly sent by her son. She tells Chandan that Laloo would not return from a foreign land as her son has not returned. Chandan realises that Laloo intends to marry Sue and settle abroad. Next day Laloo's friend Arbab dies of snake bite. Distraught Laloo realises that this village needs him more than the money he has to offer. He denies Sue's request and decides to stay back.

Sue gifts Laloo her Laptop as a parting gift with a website, 'Laloolal.com' through which he can connect with the world and access help from NGOs worldwide.

A few years down the line Laloo is seen at a govt official inquiring status of his request for an internet connection. The official makes fun of him, informing that there are thousands of application pending with him for two decades for electricity for his village and if he waits for another two decades he might get an Internet connection.

== Cast ==
- Faysal Qureshi as Laloo Lal (Laloo's real name is Rameez)
- Natasha Portess as Sue
- Aimen Iqbal as Chandan
- Shabira Channa as Mai
- Ali Gul Mallah as Arbab
