= Kaif Ghaznavi =

Pakistani Performer

- کیف غزنوی
- Born: Hyderabad, Sindh, Pakistan
- Occupations: Performer, actress, educator
- Years active: 2004–present
- Known for: Theatre and Bunvat International Festival

Kaif Ghaznavi is a Pakistani actress and performer who has been directing cultural festivals with the name of Bunvat International Festival and runs the Kaifwala Foundation. As an actress, she is better known for her role of Pari in Sang-e-Mar Mar, Feroza in Lamhay and Shabbo in Hum Kahan Ke Sachay Thay. She made her cinematic debut with Sakina Samo's directorial debut, Intezaar.

== Filmography ==
=== Theatre ===
- Chup
- Measure for Measure
- Yahudi Ki Ladki
- Bedroom Conversations
- Badshahat ka Khatma written by Sadaat Hassan Manto, Directed by Khalid Ahmed

=== Film ===
Year	Title	Role	Notes	Ref.
2020	Andha		Short film	
2022	Intezaar	Ruby	Film debut	

=== Television ===
Year	Title	Role	Network
2013	Tanhaiyan Naye Silsilay		ARY Digital
2013	Adhoori Aurat	Afshan; Zayaan's sister	Geo TV
2014	Teri Meri Jodi		Geo TV
2015	Khatoon Manzil	Rashk-e-Qamar	ARY Digital
2015	Rasam		Geo TV
2015	Takkabur	Farisa	A-Plus TV
2015	Sadqay Tumhare	Khalil's wife	Hum TV
2016	Kitni Girhain Baaki Hain (season 2)	Jamra'at	Hum TV
2016	Mein Adhuri	Hiba	ARY Digital
2016	Thora Sa Aasman	Saiqa	Geo TV
2017	Sang-e-Mar Mar	Parishay; Pari	Hum TV
2017	Piyari Bittu	Shazia	Express Entertainment
2018	Main Aur Tum Phir Se	Titli	ARY Zindagi
2018	Lamhe	Firoza; Hashir's ex-wife	Hum TV
2021	Hum Kahan Ke Sachay Thay	Shabbo	Hum TV
2025	Ek Jhooti Kahani		Hum TV
