= National Academy of Performing Arts =

Performing arts school in Karachi, Pakistan

National Academy of Performing Arts قومی اکیڈمی فنِ اداکاری و پیشکش
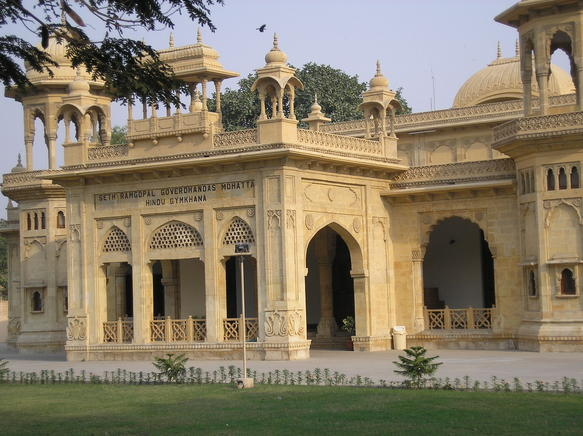
- Type: Public art school
- Established: 2005
- Affiliations: Semi Government
- Students: ≈220 (≈150 theatre, ≈70 music) (2021)
- Location: Karachi, Pakistan
- Campus: Urban
- Website: www.napa.org.pk

The National Academy of Performing Arts (Urdu: قومی اکیڈمی فنِ اداکاری و پیشکش; abbreviated as NAPA, Urdu: ناپا) is a performing arts school located at Hindu Gymkhana in Karachi, Sindh, Pakistan. NAPA was established in 2005 as an institution to conserve and teach performing arts and music.

== Departments ==
Music
At NAPA, the students of music derive benefit from being taught by a faculty consisting of practicing musicians, musicologists and visiting maestros. They will also have the opportunity to enrich their repertoire of compositions and styles by tutelage under many teachers.
Theatres Arts
The Theatre Arts department will offer students academic courses in all aspects of the theatre as well as practical exploration and the opportunity to present their work before an audience.
Make up
NAPA has also introduced lessons in Make up.

== Faculty ==
=== Chairman ===
Zia Mohyeddin was the founding Chairman of NAPA. He was asked by Pervez Musharraf, then the President of Pakistan, to establish and lead a national institution for arts and music. Besides being the founder and former chairman of NAPA, he had impeccable credentials. Trained at the Royal Academy of Dramatic Art, he spent a lifetime dedicated to the theatre, films and television, appearing in many local and foreign productions. He had also performed in numerous Broadway and West End plays. He also produced and directed extensively.

=== Notable teachers ===
Arshad Mehmood, Director Programmes and Administration.

- Talat Hussain
- Rahat Kazmi
- Khalid Ahmed (acting teacher)
- Nafees Ahmad (sitar teacher)
- Bashir Khan (tabla teacher)
- Salamat Hussain (Flute Teacher)
- Arsalan Pareyal (Guitar Teacher)
- Shehzad Ghias Shaikh

=== Alumni ===
- Paras Masroor 1st batch theatre arts
- Ahsan Bari 1st batch music
- Chahat Fateh Ali 1st batch music
- Arsalan Pareyal 4th batch music
- Rabab Hashim 1st batch theatre arts
- Ali Rizvi 1st batch theater arts
- Saqib Khan 1st batch theater arts
- Fawad khan 1st batch theater arts
- Mohsin Ali Shah 1st batch theater arts
- Uroosa Siddiqui 1st batch theater arts

== Relocation ==
In December 2018, The Supreme Court of Pakistan had directed the Sindh government to shift NAPA to another location from this Hindu Gymkhana building but, as of 11 February 2020, compliance to this directive could not be made and NAPA was still functioning there.

== See also ==
- National College of Arts
- The Hindu Gymkhana
- Theatre of Pakistan
- Music of Pakistan
