= Talkhiyaan =

2013 Pakistani television series

- Also known as: Kisi Ki Khatir
- Genre: Drama
- Based on: The God of Small Things by Arundhati Roy
- Written by: Bee Gul
- Directed by: Khalid Ahmed
- Starring: Sanam Saeed; Summer Nicks; Hina Khawaja Bayat; Shamim Hilaly; Adnan Jaffar
- Opening theme: "Mujhse Ab Meri Mohabbat Ke Fasane Naa Kaho" by Mehwish Hayat, Naseeruddin Shah and Waqar Ali
- Country of origin: Pakistan
- Original language: Urdu

Production
- Production locations: Murree, Pakistan
- Camera setup: Multi-Camera setup

Original release
- Network: Express Entertainment
- Release: 9 December 2012 – 14 April 2013

Talkhiyaan (English: Bitterness) is a 2013 Pakistani drama serial written by Bee Gul and directed by Khalid Ahmed. It highlights a stereotypical mentality of men that live by their ancestral pride and deep-rooted notions of a caste system. It depicts the frustrations of a mother, wife and daughter provoked by society.

Sanam Saeed, Summer Nicks and Mehak Khan play the lead roles.

It is based on The God of Small Things, a semi-autobiographical novel by Indian author Arundhati Roy, which won the Booker Prize in 1997. The storyline in the series is the same as that of the novel although the names of the characters are changed (Ammu is Bibi, Rahel is Zoya, Estha is Jugnoo, etc.) The series originally started airing on Express Entertainment in December 2012. It was later aired on Zindagi under the title Kisi Ki Khatir from 30 June 2015.

== Cast ==
- Sanam Saeed as Bibi (Ammu in Novel)
- Hina Khawaja Bayat as Appu Ji (Baby Kochamma in Novel)
- Shamim Hilaly as Mama (Mammachi in Novel)
- Khalid Ahmed as Baba (Pappachi in Novel)
- Hassan Niazi as Baloo (Velutha in Novel)
- Valerie Khan as Margaret (Margaret Kochamma in Novel)
- Chiara Maria as Lizzie (Sophie Mol in Novel)
- Haider Ali Khan as Jugnoo (Young - Estha)
- Mehr Sagar as Jugnoo (Child - Estha)
- Mehak Khan as Zoya (Young - Rahel)
- Sabeena Jabeen as Zoya (Child - Rahel)
- Adnan Jaffar as Janu Baba (Chacko in Novel)
- Sarmad Mirza as Monty
- Summer Nicks as Paul
- Nargis Rasheed as Aai (Kochu Maria in Novel)
