= Intezaar (2022 film) =

Pakistani drama film

- Theatrical poster
- Urdu: انتظار
- Directed by: Sakina Samo
- Written by: Bee Gul
- Produced by: Sakina Samo; Azeem Mughal
- Starring: Khalid Ahmed; Samina Ahmed; Kaif Ghaznavi
- Cinematography: Mirza Mahmood
- Music by: Darvesh
- Distributed by: Distribution Club
- Release dates: 10 September 2020 (Harlem); 19 August 2022 (Pakistan)
- Running time: 95 minutes
- Country: Pakistan
- Language: Urdu

Intezaar (Urdu: انتظار), titled Waiting in English, is a 2022 Pakistani drama film directed by Sakina Samo in her feature film directorial debut based on a script by Bee Gul. Samina Ahmed, Kaif Ghaznavi, Khalid Ahmed, Raza Ali Abid and Adnan Jaffar appear in prominent roles.

The film was first announced in June 2019 during its post-production phase, with music that was composed by Darvesh. The film had its world premiere at the Harlem International Film Festival in September 2020. After delayed theatrical releases, the film was released nationwide on 19 August 2022.

== Premise ==
Intezar revolves around a family and their fears of separation, loneliness and death as a single mother tries to handle her carefree father and mother who is diagnosed with Dementia and Cancer.

== Cast ==
- Samina Ahmed as Salma Kanwal
- Kaif Ghaznavi as Ruby
- Khalid Ahmed as Daddy
- Raza Ali Abid as Ali
- Adnan Jaffar as Sameer
- Sakina Samo as Doctor

== Production ==
Pre-production of the film started in early 2019 and the film and its cast was announced by Samo on her social media handle in June 2019, during the post-production phase of the film in Turkey. It marked Samo's feature film directorial debut and her second collaboration with Gul after she directed telefilm, Kaun Qamar Ara which was written by Gul. Owing to creative liberation, the film was made independently without the support of any media partner, as stated by the director. Before its release in theaters, the film was decided to send in international film festivals.

Initially planned to release on 20 March 2020, the theatrical release of the film was postponed due to the COVID-19 pandemic until it got a new release date of 19 August 2022.

== Accolades ==
Year	Award / Film Festival	Category	Recipient(s)	Result	Ref.
2020	Harlem International Film Festival	Best Actor	Khalid Ahmed	Won	

== See also ==
- List of Pakistani films of 2022
