= Dar Si Jaati Hai Sila =

Pakistani television series

- Title screen
- Urdu: ڈرسی جاتی ہے صلہ
- Written by: Bee Gul
- Directed by: Kashif Nisar
- Starring: Yumna Zaidi; Noman Ijaz; Kiran Haq; Saman Ansari; Aamna Malick; Sakina Samo; Sheikh Mubashir; Osama Tahir; Saleem Sheikh; Noor ul Hassan; Kinza Malik; Humayun Gul
- Opening theme: Dar Si Jaati Hoon by Yasra Haseeb
- Country of origin: Pakistan
- Original language: Urdu
- No. of seasons: 1
- No. of episodes: 25 (list of episodes)

Production
- Executive producer: Momina Duraid
- Camera setup: Multi-camera setup
- Production company: MD Productions

Original release
- Network: Hum TV
- Release: 8 November 2017 – 25 April 2018

Related
- Yaqeen Ka Safar; Kaisi Aurat Hoon Main

Dar Si Jati Hai Sila (Urdu: ڈد سی جاتی ہے صلہ, lit. 'Sila lives in fear') is a Pakistani drama serial, which started airing on Hum TV on 8 November 2017, replacing Yaqeen Ka Safar. The drama is directed by Kashif Nisar and written by Bee Gul.

It stars Noor Ul Hassan and Kinza Malik in their third on-screen appearance together on TV after Sammi and Alif Allah Aur Insaan.

It was aired on Hum Pashto 1 in Pashto under the title صلہ یریکی غوندی and on PTV Home. On national television, it aired from 1 June 2020 to 25 August 2020 and aired twice a week.

== Cast ==
- Yumna Zaidi as Sila
- Noman Ijaz as Jawad (Joyee)
- Saman Ansari as Sadia
- Sakina Samo as Aapa
- Kiran Haq as Nadia; Joyee's wife
- Saleem Sheikh as Sikander; Sila's father
- Aamna Malick as Zaynee; Sila's cousin
- Osama Tahir as Raheel; Sila's love interest
- Sheikh Mubashir as Hatim
- Noor ul Hassan as Saleem
- Munazzah Arif as Nausheen
- Kinza Malik as Tullo
- Humayun Gul as Aapa's husband

== Theme ==
The drama is based on real-life situations in which girls like Sila are victimized by people like Joyee and are kept quiet.

== Episodes ==
Episodes
No. in season	Title	Directed by	Written by	Original release date
1	"Episode – 1"	Kashif Nisar	Bee Gul	8 November 2017
The drama starts with Joyee (Noman Ijaz) walking into Sila's bedroom at night causing her to become terrified and scream. The whole house wakes up but Sila and Sila's mother (Sadia) do not tell anyone what really happened. Joyee has many faces, i.e. on one side he takes care of the household (Noor Manzil), and on the other side targets Sila and her mother, Sadia (Saman Ansari), as Sila's father lives in Canada for business reasons. Aapa (Sakina Samo), who is Sila's paternal aunt and the oldest woman in the household, actually made Joyee her foster brother because he takes care of everything and is able to flatter Aapa and hide his reality. Sila is engaged to her cousin Raheel (Sheikh Mubashir), her aunt Tullo's (Kinza Malik) son. Sila and Raheel have another cousin, Zaynee (Aamna Malick), the daughter of Nausheen (Munazzah Arif) and Saleem (Noor Ul Hassan), who is Sila's paternal uncle. She is the complete opposite of Sila— very active, kind, and also smart. Sila's only uncle who is supportive of her is (Humayun Gul), Aapa's husband and her uncle, who believes all the discourse surrounding Sila is fake.
2	"Episode – 2"	Kashif Nisar	Bee Gul	15 November 2017
Raheel wants to talk to Sila but every time he tries to talk to her, she becomes easily afraid. He comes to find out that she does not want to marry him and tells her to say so if that is the case. Sila refuses to go ahead with the marriage. Her mother slaps her and warns her that she should not say this in front of anybody. Raheel starts taking interest in Zaynee. She tells his mother to get him engaged to her instead, but his mother refuses to do so.
3	"Episode – 3"	Kashif Nisar	Bee Gul	22 November 2017
Raheel asks Sila why she rejected him, but she was unable to reply. Joyee comes and Raheel leaves, thinking she is mad. Joyee tells Sila to not refuse the engagement. Sikander (Saleem Sheikh) arrives from Canada and meets his family, brothers, Saleem (Humayun Gul) and sister Tullo. Tullo comes because she doubts that Sila is not happy with the marriage.
4	"Episode – 4"	Kashif Nisar	Bee Gul	29 November 2017
Sila refuses the engagement once again, but this time Sikander finds out and slaps her. Sila's younger brother, Hatim comes from abroad and is the best supporter of Sila. Hatim reveals to Tullo and others that she has refused the engagement once again.
5	"Episode – 5"	Kashif Nisar	Bee Gul	6 December 2017
Tullo cries because of Sila's refusal of the engagement. Sikander revokes Sila's permission to go college, to which Sila agrees because she fails. Zaynee asks Sila if she had a "prince" for which she had refused to get engaged to Raheel. Raheel says that he cannot marry Sila because he thinks she is braver than him.
6	"Episode – 6"	Kashif Nisar	Bee Gul	13 December 2017
Sikander decides to shift to Canada because of the compulsion by his family. In the meantime, Sadia meets Joyee every night at the roof and Sila notices this thing. Sikander asks Joyee about Sila's marriage to which he disagrees. Sikander says that no-one has done him justice, to which Badi Aapa rises up and says that he is ungrateful for things that they have done for him.
7	"Episode – 7"	Kashif Nisar	Bee Gul	20 December 2017
Sila once again shouts during her sleep after which Sikander decides to take her to a psychiatrist. Sila rudely asks Sadia why she wants to let her go to the hospital. Sadia tells her to stop doubting her. Tullo asks Sadia when she is leaving for Canada, but does not tell her because of Joyee. Zaynee asks Joyee if he is the one who Sila is scared of.
8	"Episode – 8"	Kashif Nisar	Bee Gul	27 December 2017
Sikander goes back to Canada, leaving Sadia devastated. Sila tells her that those tears might be of happiness because she has now become independent once again, which devastates her even more. Zaynee misbehaves with Aapa, who condemns Nausheen for her daughter's behaviour. Aapa tells Sadia of her decision of marrying Sila and Joyee.
9	"Episode – 9"	Kashif Nisar	Bee Gul	3 January 2018
Zaynee cries hearing of Sila's marriage to Joyee so she tells this to Raheel and Tullo. Tullo tells her that the decision made is not bad at all, and Raheel asks her what she would do if this was the case with her daughter, to which she replies that she would do the same. Aapa tells Joyee to serve his mother-in-law (Sadia) after which he touches her foot when her plate falls. Zaynee and Raheel tell Joyee to refuse the marriage to which he replies that he had also not refused when he was going to marry Sila, but Sila was the one who refused, so he will only refuse if Sila refuses.
10	"Episode – 10"	Kashif Nisar	Bee Gul	10 January 2018
Sila agrees to her marriage with Joyee, but her mother refuses. Sila tells Sadia that she might be jealous of her marriage with her lover, making her slap Sila.
11	"Episode – 11"	Kashif Nisar	Bee Gul	17 January 2018
Nausheen asks Zaynee if she has any objection over her marriage with Raheel, while Saleem asks her the same question at the same time to which she says that she has no objection. Sila warns Sadia not to meet Joyee. When she sees them both on the roof, she hits Joyee and asks Sadia her relation with Joyee or else she will cut her hand with a knife. Forces by Sila, Sadia reveals that Hatim is Joyee's son.
12	"Episode – 12"	Kashif Nisar	Bee Gul	24 January 2018
After the secret of Hatim's biological father is revealed, Sila does not speak to Hatim and stays away from him. Aapa also decides to break Sila and Joyee's engagement after Sila hits him when he tries to assault Sadia. Joyee tries to convince her otherwise but Aapa refuses. Raheel is also slowly becoming attracted to Sila due to her kind and obedient nature. Hatim recovers, after which Sadia does not allow him to go back to his hostel, but he does not oblige.
13	"Episode – 13"	Kashif Nisar	Bee Gul	31 January 2018
Joyee tells Sadia not to be harsh with Hatim, all while Hatim is beginning to suspect that they are hiding something from him. Raheel praises Sila on her recent work with him, and on the other side Aapa tells Joyee about how she has found a new suitable match for him and how she is much better than Sila. Sila watches Joyee harassing Sadia, but Raheel has also seen what has happened, and in a panic, Sila runs off. Raheel begins to put the pieces together and the episode ends with him finding a picture of himself in Sila's books and asking her if she cares about him.
14	"Episode – 14"	Kashif Nisar	Bee Gul	24 January 2018
The episode begins with Zaynee telling her mother she is not really interested in marriage and then the scene cuts to an excerpt from the previous episode where Raheel confronts Sila about the picture in her book. Zaynee also joins them and finds out about this. Zaynee yells at Sila, accusing her of not caring about her as she never tells her anything and is never honest with her. When Zaynee meets up with Raheel later that evening, they discuss and try to figure out why Sila is acting the way she is and start getting closer to finding out the truth. Hatim confronts Sadia about how she never loved him but she yells at Joyee for making him want to drop out of boarding school. On the day leading up to Joyee's wedding, Sadia begs Joyee to forget about her but Joyee is harassing her as usual and Aapa walks into the scene.
25	"Episode – 25"	Kashif Nisar	Bee Gul	24 April 2018
Joyee explains to the family that how much he repents about what happened and is willing to marry Sadia and accept Hatim as his son. Sikander gives his approval as he could not wait to get rid of Sadia. However, Sadia wants to explain everything but requests Sila's presence. After marriage with Sikander, Sadia struggled to win Sikander's love and approval but she was always humiliated by Sikander. Joyee took advantage of situation and befriended Sadia and at one night he forced himself upon her. Later he blackmailed her to meet him or he would expose her. Later, as Sila grew up, he threatened to molest Sila and Sadia in order to protect her daughter gave herself to Joyee's desires. While Sila reconciles with her mother. Joyee's Wife, Nadira arrives with medical test reports which prove Joyee to be incapable of being a father, proving that Hatim is in fact Sikander's son. Sikander, now shameful of his behaviour, seeks Sadia's forgiveness, accepts Hatim as his son and throws Joyee out of the house. Days later Sila is shown to be playing cricket with family when their ball end of new the main door of house. Apa goes to get the ball and sees Joyee begging for forgiveness at the door. She closes the door and on Sila's inquiry tells it was a beggar. Sila, suspicious of the man is about to ensure he was a beggar when her cousin calls her to take her turn and she runs to them joyfully.

== Reception ==
=== Critical reception ===
While reviewing the series, Buraq Shabbir of The News International praised the performances of the actors and the sensitive handling of the subject.

== Awards and nominations ==
Year	Awards	Category	Nominated work	Result	Ref(s)
2019	Hum Awards	Best Actor Male - Jury	Noman Ijaz	Won	
2019	Hum Awards	Best Onscreen Couple	Yumna Zaidi & Osama Tahir	Nominated	
2019	Hum Awards	Best Actor Female – Jury	Yumna Zaidi	Won	
2019	Hum Awards	Best Drama Serial – Jury	Dar Si Jaati Hai Sila	Won	
2019	Lux Style Awards	Best TV Play	Dar Si Jaati Hai Sila	Nominated	
2019	Lux Style Awards	Best TV Director	Kashif Nisar	Won	
2019	Lux Style Awards	Best TV Actor (Critics' Choice)	Noman Ijaz	Won	
2019	Lux Style Awards	Best TV Actor (Viewer's Choice)	Noman Ijaz	Nominated	
2019	Lux Style Awards	Best TV Writer	Bee Gul	Won	
2019	Lux Style Awards	Best Original TV Soundtrack	Dar Si Jaati Hai Sila	Nominated	
2019	Lux Style Awards	Best Emergening TV Talent	Osama Tahir	Nominated	
2019	3rd IPPA Awards 2019	Best Supporting Actor TV serial	Saman Ansari	Nominated	
2019	3rd IPPA Awards 2019	Best Director TV Serial	Kashif Nisar	Nominated	
2019	3rd IPPA Awards 2019	Best TV Serial -Viewer's Choice	Dar Si Jaati Hai Sila	Nominated	
2019	3rd IPPA Awards 2019	Best Actress-Viewer's choice	Yumna Zaidi	Nominated	
2019	3rd IPPA Awards 2019	Best Actor-Viewer's choice	Noman Ijaz	Nominated	
