= The God of Small Things =

1997 novel by Arundhati Roy

- First edition
- Author: Arundhati Roy
- Cover artist: Sanjeev Saith
- Language: English
- Genre: Novel
- Publisher: Random House (USA); Random House of Canada (Canada); HarperCollins (UK); RST IndiaInk & Penguin Books (India)
- Publication date: 15 March 1997
- Publication place: India
- Media type: Print (hardback & paperback)
- Awards: Booker Prize (1997)
- ISBN: 0-06-097749-3
- OCLC: 37864514

The God of Small Things is the 1997 debut novel written by Indian author Arundhati Roy. The novel follows the seven-year-old twins Estha and Rahel, raised by a single mother, as they navigate their childhood, the tensions in their family and the circumstances surrounding the arrival of their British cousin to Ayemenem, India, with the twins later reuniting in their thirties. The novel's events are set against the backdrop of social discrimination and political upheaval in 1960s Kerala, with casteism and British colonialism in India being central themes.

Upon publication, the novel became a bestseller and was the recipient of the 1997 Booker Prize. The God of Small Things is Roy's most well known work. It is considered a staple of postcolonial literature.

== Plot ==
The story is structured with a disjointed narrative shifting between 1969 when the fraternal twins Rahel and Esthappen are children, and 1993 when they meet again in adulthood, the same age as their mother when she died. Ammu Ipe, their mother, hailing from a Syrian Christian family, divorces their father and takes the twins with her when she returns to her family in Ayemenem, Kerala. Chacko, Ammu's brother and the twins' uncle, returns from England after his divorce with Margaret, an English woman. The family home includes Mammachi, the ageing matriarch and mother to Ammu and Chacko, and Baby Kochamma, the twins' grand-aunt.

The death of Margaret's second husband prompts Chacko to invite her and their daughter, Sophie, to visit Ayemenem. On the road to the airport, the family encounters a group of Communist protesters who surround the car and humiliate Baby Kochamma. Among the protestors, Rahel thinks she sees Velutha, an untouchable servant who works for the family's pickle factory, and a close friend of the twins. Later at the theater, Estha is sexually molested by the "Orangedrink Lemondrink Man", a vendor working at the snack counter. Rahel's claim of seeing Velutha in the Communist mob leads Baby Kochamma to associate him with her humiliation. Rahel and Estha develop a bond with Velutha, while Ammu is drawn to him romantically, and they begin a clandestine relationship. When Velutha's father exposes their affair to Mammachi, Ammu is locked in her room and Velutha is banished. Ammu blames the twins for her plight, leading them to flee the house with their cousin Sophie, taking their boat in order to reach the abandoned house across the nearby river. The boat capsizes and Sophie drowns; Margaret and Chacko return to find her body dead on the sofa.

The twins shelter in the abandoned house; unbeknownst to them, Velutha is seeking refuge there as well. Baby Kochamma accuses Velutha of Sophie's death, leading to his brutal beating and arrest by the police, a traumatic event that is witnessed by the twins. At the police station, the twins are questioned by a police inspector, who realises Baby Kochamma's deception. Aware of Velutha's Communist ties, he fears unrest if the wrongful arrest is exposed, and he threatens Baby Kochamma for falsely accusing Velutha. To save herself, Baby Kochamma manipulates Estha and Rahel into implicating Velutha in Sophie's death. Velutha dies from his injuries.

Baby Kochamma convinces Chacko that Ammu and the twins are responsible for Sophie's death. Chacko ejects Ammu from the house and Ammu decides to separate the twins, sending Estha away to his father and boarding school. Ammu loses her job and visits Rahel in Ayemenem after she is expelled from boarding school. Rahel, now eleven, is unenthused to see her and Ammu dies shortly after in a hotel room of a respiratory illness complicated by asthma, aged 31. Only Rahel and Chacko attend her cremation, and Rahel becomes distant. She studies architecture at University in Delhi, where she meets her husband, Larry, and moves to America with him. After they divorce, Rahel returns to Ayemenem and reunites with Estha, who lives a solitary, mute existence with Baby Kochamma and her servant, who are now the only occupants of the house. The twins reconcile and seek comfort in one another through physical consummation. The novel concludes with a bittersweet reflection on Ammu's and Velutha's relationship.

== Characters ==
=== Major characters ===
- Esthappen "Estha", Rahel's twin brother, a serious, intelligent and somewhat nervous child whose trauma leaves him mute in adulthood
- Rahel, Estha's twin sister, an intelligent and impulsive child who becomes a detached drifter in adulthood
- Ammu Ipe, the twins' mother, an independent, strong-willed woman who is looked down upon due to her status as a divorcée
- Velutha, a Paravan or untouchable caste carpenter for the Ipe family secretly involved in the local Communist movement, intelligent and kind with Ammu and the twins
- Chacko Ipe, Estha's and Rahel's maternal uncle, a proud Anglophile who studied at Oxford who professes Communist ideals while managing the Ipe family's pickle factory. He and his English ex-wife Margaret share a daughter, Sophie
- Baby Kochamma (Navomi Ipe), the twins' resentful maternal great aunt who is spiteful towards the twins

=== Secondary characters ===
- Sophie, also known as "Sophie Mol," only daughter of Chacko and Margaret, but raised by Margaret and stepfather Joe, and Estha's and Rahel's half-British cousin. She visits Ayemenem two months after her stepfather's death in a car accident.
- Margaret, also known as "Margaret Kochamma", Sophie Mol's English mother, Chacko's ex-wife and Joe's widow
- Mammachi (Soshamma Ipe), the twins' grandmother and mother of Ammu and Chacko, owner of Paradise Pickles
- Pappachi (Benaan John Ipe), Rahel's and Estha's late grandfather, son of a reverend and an embittered entomologist who physically abused Mammachi before being stopped by Chacko
- Kochu Maria, a cook and servant who lives in the Ayemenem House
- Baba, the twins' absent, alcoholic father and ex-husband of Ammu, a tea plantation worker in Assam
- Vellya Paapen, Velutha's father
- Kuttapen, Velutha's older brother, who is paralyzed from the waist down from a work accident
- Father Mulligan, an Irish Catholic priest that Baby Kochamma fell in love with when she was a young woman
- Mr. Hollick, Baba's boss at the Assam tea estate
- Larry McCaslin, Rahel's American ex-husband and doctoral scholar. Their relationship ends once he realises Rahel cannot emotionally connect to him.
- Comrade K. N. M. Pillai, the hypocritical leader of the Communist Party in Ayemenem and a family friend of the Ipes
- Inspector Thomas Mathew, a calculating policeman who leads the investigation into Sophie's death

== Development and publication ==
=== Development ===
Roy began writing the manuscript for The God of Small Things in 1992 and finished four years later in 1996, leading to its publication the following year. The potential of the story was first recognized by HarperCollins editor Pankaj Mishra, who sent it to three British publishers. Roy received a £500,000 advance, and the rights to the book were sold in 21 countries.

Arundhati Roy, after being involved with making films and writing screenplays, popularly In Which Annie Gives It Those Ones and Electric Moon, "wanted to do something where I didn't have to deal with people; I wanted to do something alone." She bought a computer and soon figured out how to use it. She noted she didn't know she was writing a novel. Roy took inspiration from her childhood experiences in Aymanam, a village in the Kottayam district of Kerala, India, where she led an unprotected child's life. Being an "adult child", Roy observed and remembered what she sensed in the village and "said everything I wanted to say at that point of time" through writing the novel.

Roy began writing her first novel on her computer in 1992 in New Delhi, though the first few months she "was just fooling around before I realized what was happening and got down to writing the book properly" and completed it in 1996. Without a plan, she enjoyed that her writing "kept surprising" her and was unsure if she would ever finish it. She didn't tell her friends or her husband Pradip Krishen about her writing, "afraid she would talk the tale out". Krishen adored when she showed him her final draft. She "wrote it out of sequence. I didn't start with the first chapter or end with the last chapter. I actually started writing with a single image in my head: the sky blue Plymouth with two twins inside it, a Marxist procession surrounding it. And it just developed from there. The language just started weaving together, sentence by sentence."

Roy stated that she never rewrote a written sentence in the novel and that arranging the plot took time, "but was never painful." Roy said that the novel is semi-autobiographical. For instance, she modelled some of her characters from those she knew in real life, like her mother Mary Roy as Ammu, her maternal grandfather P.V. Issac as Pappachi, her uncle George Issac as Chacko, his ex-wife Cecilia Philipson as Margaret Kochamma just to say a few. Roy's mother confirmed she was very similar to the character Ammu; however, unlike Ammu, she was never involved with a man of lower caste.

Roy's training as an architect influenced her writing. One day, she "woke up and sketched the plot graphically with a series of drawings. That's when I understood what I was getting at." Writing the novel was "about design" and "like architecture" for her. She told Salon in 1997:

"In buildings, there are design motifs that occur again and again, that repeat—patterns, curves. These motifs help us feel comfortable in a physical space. And the same works in writing, I've found. For me, the way words, punctuation and paragraphs fall on the page is important as well—the graphic design of the language. That was why the words and thoughts of Estha and Rahel, the twins, were so playful on the page... I was being creative with their design. Words were broken apart, and then sometimes fused together. 'Later' became 'Lay. Ter.' 'An owl' became 'A Nowl.' 'Sour metal smell' became 'sourmetal smell.'"

The novel's title was conceived at "the very last minute" while the manuscript was going to press. Speaking to HarperCollins, Roy said: "One of the chapters was called The God of Small Things, I don't know how that happened, ... When I read the book now I can't believe the amount of references there are to small things, but it was absolutely not the case that I started with the title and built the novel around it."

=== Publication ===
The God of Small Things was published by various publishers in 1997. The potential of the story was first recognized by HarperCollins editor Pankaj Mishra, who sent it to three British publishers. The rights for the novel were auctioned by her British agent, David Godwin, for $250,000 in the UK and $160,000 to Random House in New York. Godwin was alerted by Mishra, who took the manuscript along on a train trip and "overcome with excitement, broke the journey midway to telephone his congratulations to Roy." Godwin, after reading a sample chapter in London, "booked the first flight to India on impulse ... and signed her up on the spot". Roy was paid $1.6 million in advance. She felt pressure to live up to her massive advance, but she said, "It's their business risk, ... I trust my book."

== Reception ==
The God of Small Things received stellar reviews in major American newspapers such as The New York Times (a "dazzling first novel", "extraordinary", "at once so morally strenuous and so imaginatively supple") and the Los Angeles Times ("a novel of poignancy and considerable sweep"), and in Canadian publications such as the Toronto Star ("a lush, magical novel"). Time named it one of the best books of the year. Critical response in the United Kingdom was less positive, and the awarding of the Booker Prize caused controversy; Carmen Callil, a 1996 Booker Prize judge, called the novel "execrable", and The Guardian described the contest as "profoundly depressing". In India, the book was criticised especially for its unrestrained description of sexuality. E. K. Nayanar, then Chief Minister of Roy's home state Kerala, voiced criticism about the book's depiction of women and sex, and she had to answer charges of obscenity. Some critics have pointed out that the reader reviews of this book on bookseller websites are so extremely opposed at times that it is difficult to imagine readers are talking about the same book.

The book has since been translated into Malayalam by Priya A. S., under the title Kunju Karyangalude Odeythampuran (Malayalam: കുഞ്ഞുകാര്യങ്ങളുടെ ഒടേതമ്പുരാൻ).

In 2014, the novel was ranked in The Daily Telegraph as one of the 10 all-time greatest Asian novels. On 5 November 2019, the BBC News listed The God of Small Things on its list of the 100 most influential novels. Emma Lee-Potter of The Independent listed it as one of the 12 best Indian novels.

In 2022, the novel was included on the "Big Jubilee Read" list of 70 books by Commonwealth authors, selected to celebrate the Platinum Jubilee of Elizabeth II.

=== Awards ===
Roy was awarded the 1997 Booker Prize for The God of Small Things. The award carried a prize of approximately US$30,000 and a citation that noted, "The book keeps all the promises that it makes". Roy donated the prize money she received, as well as royalties from her book, to human rights causes. However, the decision to award the novel was controversial. Callil said on television that it should not even have been on the shortlist. Booker Prize chairman Martyn Goff said Roy won because nobody objected, following the rejection by the judges of Bernard MacLaverty's shortlisted book due to their dismissal of him as "a wonderful short-story writer and that Grace Notes was three short stories strung together".

== In popular culture ==
In the novel, there is a four-lyric song "Pa pera-pera-pera-perakka/ Endeparambil thooralley/ Chetende parambil thoorikko" that her mother Mary Roy wrote for school children. It was later used as a soundtrack for the 1999 Malayalam film Olympian Anthony Adam.

In 2013, Talkhiyaan, a Pakistani television series based on the novel, was aired on Express Entertainment.

The band Darlingside credits the novel as the inspiration for their song "The God of Loss".
