= Samar Jafri =

Pakistani actor

- ثمر عباس جعفری
- Born: Samar; Islamabad, Pakistan
- Occupations: Actor, Singer, Composer
- Years active: 2014–present
- Notable work: Mayi Ri (2023) Na Baligh Afraad (2024) Parwarish (2025)

Samar Jafri (Urdu: ثمر عباس جعفری) is a Pakistani actor, singer, and composer. He is known for his role in the TV dramas Mayi Ri (2023) and Parwarish (2025) and the movie Na Baligh Afraad (2024).

== Acting career ==
In 2023 he played Fakhir Zaheer in Mayi Ri on ARY Digital.

In 2025, he played Wali Jahangir in Parwarish, a family drama produced by Fahad Mustafa and directed by Meesam Naqvi.

In 2024 Jafri made his film debut with Na Baligh Afraad, a coming-of-age comedy directed by Nabeel Qureshi and produced by Fizza Ali Meerza. He won the Actor of the Year Male Award Viewers Choice in 2025 at the Lux Style Awards for his work.

== Music career ==
In 2025, he contributed track Main Rahun for the drama Parwarish. He has also collaborated with other Pakistani artists Aashir Wajahat and Abdul Hannan.

== Filmography ==
=== Films ===
Year	Title	Role	Producer	Notes	Ref(s)
2024	Na Baligh Afraad	Fakhar	Fizza Ali Meerza	Film debut	

=== Television ===
Year	Title	Role	Network	Director	Notes	Ref(s)
2023	Mein Kahani Hun	–	Express TV		Co-starred with Aijaz Aslam and Tazeen Hussain	
2023	Mayi Ri	Fakhir Zaheer	ARY Digital	Meesam Naqvi	Lead role; performed OST (composition by Waqar Ali)	
2025	Parwarish	Wali Jahangir	ARY Digital	Meesam Naqvi	Produced by Fahad Mustafa	
2026	Raja London Ka	Raja	Express TV	Fajr Raza	Lead role	

== Awards and nominations ==
Year	Award	Category	Work	Result	Ref(s)
2025	24th Lux Style Awards	Film Actor of the Year - Male	Na Baligh Afraad	Won	
2026	3rd Pakistan International Screen Awards	Best Actor - Film	Na Baligh Afraad	Nominated	
