= Nabeel Qureshi (director) =

Pakistani filmmaker (born 1985)

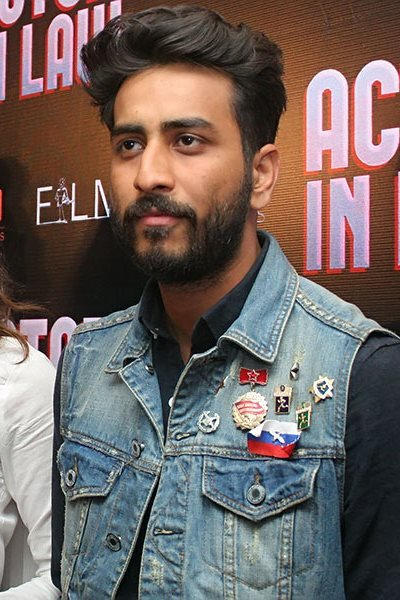
- Qureshi in 2016
- Born: 1985 (age 40–41)
- Occupations: Film director; Screenwriter
- Years active: 2004–present

Nabeel Qureshi (Urdu: نبیل قریشی; born 1985) is a Pakistani film director and screenwriter. He made his feature-film directorial debut with the comedy thriller Na Maloom Afraad (2014), which he co-wrote with Fizza Ali Meerza. He has since collaborated frequently with Meerza through Filmwala Pictures, directing films including Actor in Law (2016), Load Wedding (2018), Khel Khel Mein (2021), Quaid-e-Azam Zindabad (2022), Na Baligh Afraad (2024), and Zombeid (2026).

Qureshi's films have included social comedy subjects such as dowry in Load Wedding and the legacy of the 1971 fall of Dhaka in Khel Khel Mein. He won the Lux Style Award for Best Film Director for Na Maloom Afraad and Actor in Law, and shared the Film of the Year – Viewers' Choice award for Khel Khel Mein at the 21st Lux Style Awards.

== Early career ==
Before working in feature films, Qureshi studied theatre at the National Academy of Performing Arts in Karachi and worked in television, including on commercials and videos for Banana News Network. A 2014 profile in The News on Sunday described him as a Karachi-based filmmaker and former producer of Banana News Network.

== Career ==
=== Feature-film debut and early success ===
Qureshi made his feature-film directorial debut with the comedy thriller Na Maloom Afraad (2014), which he co-wrote with producer Fizza Ali Meerza. He said in a 2014 interview that he and Meerza developed the screenplay together because they wanted the film to be written specifically for cinema rather than adapted from television writing practices.

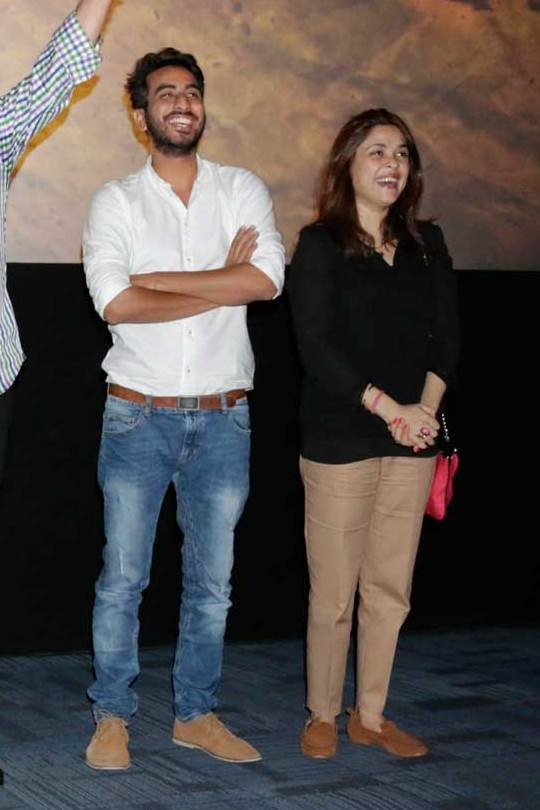
Qureshi with frequent collaborator Fizza Ali Meerza in 2014

Na Maloom Afraad earned Rs. 110 million in two and a half months and received a special screening at the South Asian International Film Festival in New York. A review in Herald described the film as a light-hearted comedy that used colloquial humour and a Karachi setting to address urban violence and social disorder. At the 14th Lux Style Awards, Qureshi won Best Film Director for the film.

Qureshi and Meerza next collaborated on Actor in Law (2016), a social comedy starring Fahad Mustafa, Mehwish Hayat and Om Puri. The film became the highest-grossing Pakistani film of 2016. Qureshi and Meerza have described their working arrangement as a collaborative script-development process, with Meerza producing and Qureshi directing. At the 16th Lux Style Awards, Actor in Law won Best Film and Qureshi won Best Film Director.

=== Later 2010s work ===
Qureshi continued his collaboration with Meerza on Na Maloom Afraad 2 (2017) and Load Wedding (2018). Load Wedding, starring Fahad Mustafa and Mehwish Hayat, deals with wedding-related social pressure and the practice of dowry. Qureshi said that popular culture could play a role in social change, while reviews also noted the film's focus on the burden placed on women by wedding customs and dowry expectations.

=== 2020s ===
In 2019, Qureshi and Meerza announced two films, Quaid-e-Azam Zindabad and Fatman. Quaid-e-Azam Zindabad was described as an action comedy about a police officer, while Fatman was described as an action comedy drama about an ordinary person who accidentally becomes a superhero. In March 2020, Qureshi said that pre-production on Fatman had been halted because of the COVID-19 pandemic, while post-production on Quaid-e-Azam Zindabad continued.

Qureshi directed Khel Khel Mein (2021), starring Sajal Aly and Bilal Abbas Khan. The film focuses on the events surrounding the 1971 fall of Dhaka through a youth-oriented drama-club narrative.

In 2023, Qureshi directed Jin Mahal, the horror-comedy segment of the anthology film Teri Meri Kahaniyaan. He then directed Na Baligh Afraad (2024), a comedy set in the 1990s and produced by Meerza.

Qureshi's film Zombeid, starring Fahad Mustafa and Mehwish Hayat, was set for release on Eidul Azha 2026. The film is a zombie thriller and was among the Pakistani films scheduled for cinemas on Eid day.

== Filmography ==
=== Films ===
Key
†	Denotes films that have not yet been released

Year	Film	Director	Writer	Notes
2014	Na Maloom Afraad	Yes	Yes	
2016	Actor in Law	Yes	Yes	Special appearance in the title song "Actor in Law"
2017	Na Maloom Afraad 2	Yes	Yes	
2018	Load Wedding	Yes	Yes	
2021	Khel Khel Mein	Yes	Yes	
2022	Quaid-e-Azam Zindabad	Yes	Yes	Special appearance in the song "Loota Rey"
2023	Teri Meri Kahaniyaan	Yes	No	Segment: Jin Mahal
2024	Na Baligh Afraad	Yes	Yes	
2026	Zombeid	Yes	Yes	
TBA	Fatman †	Yes	Yes	Pre-production postponed in 2020

=== Frequent collaborators ===
The following table lists actors who have appeared in three or more feature films directed by Qureshi.

Frequent actor collaborations (3 or more feature films)
Film Actor	Na Maloom Afraad (2014)	Actor in Law (2016)	Na Maloom Afraad 2 (2017)	Load Wedding (2018)	Khel Khel Mein (2021)	Quaid-e-Azam Zindabad (2022)	Na Baligh Afraad (2024)	Zombeid (2026)	Total films
Fahad Mustafa	Yes	Yes	Yes	Yes		Yes	Yes	Yes	7
Mehwish Hayat	Yes	Yes		Yes				Yes	4
Javed Sheikh	Yes		Yes		Yes	Yes			4
Mohsin Abbas Haider	Yes		Yes	Yes					3
Nayyar Ejaz	Yes	Yes	Yes			Yes			4
Saleem Mairaj	Yes	Yes	Yes			Yes	Yes		5
Irfan Motiwala	Yes	Yes				Yes	Yes		4
Ashhad Siddiqui	Yes	Yes	Yes						3

=== Television and music videos ===
Year	Title	Medium	Role	Notes
—N/a	Banana News Network	Television	Producer	Comedy news show
2012	"Beparwah Dhola"	Music video	Director	Song by Mohsin Abbas Haider

== Discography ==
=== Singles ===
- Khamosh Dono (2011)

== Awards and nominations ==
Year	Award	Category	Nominated work	Result	Ref.
2015	Lux Style Awards	Best Film Director	Na Maloom Afraad	Won	
2015	Lux Style Awards	Best Original Soundtrack	Na Maloom Afraad	Won	
2017	Lux Style Awards	Best Film Director	Actor in Law	Won	
2018	Lux Style Awards	Best Film Director	Na Maloom Afraad 2	Nominated	
2019	Lux Style Awards	Best Film Director	Load Wedding	Nominated	
2022	Lux Style Awards	Film of the Year – Viewers' Choice	Khel Khel Mein	Won	
2025	Lux Style Awards	Best Film Director of the Year – Critics' Choice	Teri Meri Kahaniyaan	Nominated	

== See also ==
- List of film directors
- List of Pakistani television directors
