= Zombeid =

2026 Pakistani film by Nabeel Qureshi

- Theatrical release poster
- Directed by: Nabeel Qureshi
- Written by: Fizza Ali Meerza; Nabeel Qureshi
- Produced by: Fizza Ali Meerza; Mehdi Ali
- Starring: Fahad Mustafa; Mehwish Hayat; Babar Ali
- Cinematography: Rana Kamran
- Music by: Shani Arshad
- Production company: Filmwala Pictures
- Distributed by: Geo Films
- Release date: 27 May 2026 (Pakistan)
- Running time: 105 minutes
- Country: Pakistan
- Language: Urdu
- Box office: Rs. 35 crore (US$1.3 million)

Zombeid is a 2026 Pakistani Urdu-language zombie thriller film directed by Nabeel Qureshi, who co-wrote it with Fizza Ali Meerza. Produced by Filmwala Pictures and distributed by Geo Films, it stars Fahad Mustafa, Mehwish Hayat and Babar Ali. Set in Karachi on Chand Raat, the film follows a fighter, a Zumba instructor and other civilians who try to survive a zombie outbreak that begins after a prototype steroid injection is consumed at a mixed martial arts cage match.

Marketed as Pakistan's first zombie thriller, Zombeid was released in Pakistan and the United Arab Emirates during Eid al-Adha in 2026, alongside the Pakistani films Psycho and Luv Di Saun. Within its first week of release, the film was reported to have grossed Rs. 21.34 crore (US$760,000) in Pakistan, becoming the highest-grossing film released during Eid al-Adha in the country. The film eventually grossed over Rs. 35 crore (US$1.3 million) during its lifetime theatrical run, marking it as a commercial success for Pakistani cinema.

== Cast ==
- Fahad Mustafa as Wali
- Mehwish Hayat as Zara
- Babar Ali
- Dodi Khan as Marwan
- Javed Sheikh as Wali & Marwan's mentor
- Irfan Motiwala
- Mani
- Mohsin Abbas Haider

== Production ==
In January 2026, Pakistani media reported that Fahad Mustafa and Mehwish Hayat had reunited for an untitled film, their first on-screen collaboration in eight years since Load Wedding (2018). The project was reported as a new collaboration between the duo of director Nabeel Qureshi and producer Fizza Ali Meerza. The film marks the fourth collaboration between Mustafa, Hayat and Qureshi, after Na Maloom Afraad, Actor in Law and Load Wedding.

On 9 April 2026, Mustafa announced the title Zombeid. The first poster was unveiled the following day, featuring horror imagery with blood-splattered everyday objects and prompting online discussion about the film's genre shift. The teaser trailer introduced the film's zombie outbreak premise and featured Mustafa and Hayat in action and survival sequences, while Babar Ali was also identified as appearing in the preview. Coverage noted the teaser's combination of gore, stunts and romance as a departure from conventional Pakistani screen dramas.

The film trailer was launched at Arts Council Karachi in May 2026. Images described the trailer as combining gore with Pakistani humour and evoking 1980s action films, noting visual comparisons to First Blood, The Terminator and Die Hard.

In an interview with Arab News, Hayat said she prepared for the role of a Zumba instructor by attending fitness classes in the United States and working on her physical fitness because the role was physically demanding, outside the romantic and emotional roles with which she had often been associated. Hayat described Zombeid as part of experimentation, combining horror, comedy and action within a mainstream Pakistani release, and urged Pakistani filmmakers to move beyond repeated formulas and take greater creative risks with genre storytelling.

== Release ==
Marketed as Pakistan's first zombie thriller, Zombeid was released in Pakistan and UAE on Eid al-Adha in 2026, alongside the Pakistani films Psycho and Luv Di Saun. Dawn reported that the release of three Pakistani films during the Eid window reflected a period of more consistent local film production.

=== Digital media ===
Following its theatrical run, Zombeid became available for digital streaming on Tapmad, and was scheduled for its world television premiere on Geo Entertainment on 1 November 2026 at 8:00 PM.

== Reception ==
=== Box office ===
By 2 June 2026, Zombeid was reported to have grossed Rs. 21.34 crore (US$760,000) at the box office in Pakistan following its Eid al-Adha release, and to have become the highest-grossing film released during Eid al-Adha in the country. The film eventually grossed over Rs. 35 crore (US$1.3 million) during its lifetime theatrical run.

=== Critical response ===
Muhammad Suhayb of Youlin Magazine described Zombeid as an "enjoyable and accessible viewing experience", praising its performances, humour, makeup, visual effects and production design. He wrote that the film was "not without its flaws", citing uneven editing, underdeveloped characters, familiar dialogue and an uneven soundtrack, but concluded that it was a "successful and entertaining addition" to Pakistan's zombie genre.

Yousuf Mehmood of PakistaniCinema.net called the film a "solid first attempt" at a big-budget Pakistani zombie film, praising its makeup effects, production design, visual effects, performances and sound design. He criticised parts of the film's pacing, dialogue and depiction of Karachi, writing that some scenes lingered too long and that Babar Ali's character was given generic dialogue.

Writing for Dawn Images, Hufsa Chaudhry gave the film 6.5 out of 10 and described its acting, plot and visuals as "fine". She praised the topical jokes, allusions to Karachi and Pakistani culture, and the chemistry between Mustafa and Hayat, while criticising the film's basic zombie lore, limited sense of place and lack of deeper thematic development.

== See also ==
- List of Pakistani films of 2026
