= List of Pakistani films of 2024 =

List of Pakistani films by year 2024

This is a list of Pakistani films that were released in 2024.

== Highest-grossing films ==
The top ten highest-grossing Pakistani films released in 2024, by worldwide box office gross revenue, are as follows.

Background color indicates films still showing in cinemas

Highest-grossing films of 2024
| Rank | Title | Studio | Gross |
|---|---|---|---|
| 1 | Umro Ayyar – A New Beginning | VR Chili Production | Rs. 18 crore (US$640,000) |
| 2 | Daghabaaz Dil | Showcase Films | Rs. 15 crore (US$540,000) |
| 3 | Mastaani | D.U. Entertainment | Rs. 10.00 crore (US$360,000) |
| 4 | Na Baligh Afraad | Filmwala Pictures & Happy Films | Rs. 6.3 crore (US$230,000) |
| 5 | Kattar Karachi | Kattar Karachi Productions | Rs. 5.5 crore (US$200,000) |
| 6 | Taxali Gate | Suffler Films | Rs. 5.02 crore (US$180,000) |
| 7 | Leech | Glamora Films | Rs. 5.00 crore (US$180,000) |
| 8 | Abhi | Pennine Kennedy Films & GM Productions | Rs. 5 crore (US$180,000) |
| 9 | The Glassworker | Mano Animation Studios | Rs. 3.50 crore (US$130,000) |
| 10 | Nayab | Kenneyz Films | Rs. 2.80 crore (US$100,000) |
| 11 | Poppay Ki Wedding | Starstruck Films | Rs. 0.80 crore (US$29,000) |

== January–March ==
| Opening | | Title | Director | Cast | Studio (production house) | Ref. |
|---|---|---|---|---|---|---|
| J A N | 5 | Wakhri | Iram Parveen Bilal | Faryal Mehmood; Sohail Sameer; Bakhtawar Mazhar; Tooba Siddiqui; Saleem Mairaj | Parveen Shah Productions | |
| J A N | 26 | Nayab | Umair Nisar Ali | Yumna Zaidi; Jawed Sheikh; Usama Khan | Kenneyz Films | |
| F E B | 16 | Taxali Gate | Abu Aleeha | Ayesha Omer; Yasir Hussain; Mehar Bano | Suffler Films | |

== April–June ==
| Opening | | Title | Director | Cast | Production House | Ref. |
|---|---|---|---|---|---|---|
| A P R | 11 | Daghabaaz Dil | Wajahat Rauf | Mehwish Hayat; Ali Rehman Khan; Momin Saqib | Hum Films & Showcase Films | |
| A P R | 11 | Hum Tum Aur Woo | Nomaan Khan | Junaid Khan; Amna Ilyas; Afshan; Raja Yasir | NK Pictures | |
| M A Y | 10 | Poppay Ki Wedding | Kanza Zia & Amar Lasani | Khushhal Khan; Nazish Jahangir; Rehan Sheikh; Aleezay Rasul | Hum Films & Starstruck Films | |
| J U N | 17 | Na Baligh Afraad | Asad Mumtaz | Aashir Wajahat; Samar Jafri; Rimha Ahmed | Filmwala Pictures & Happy Films | |
| J U N | 17 | Abhi | Asad Mumtaz | Goher Mumtaz; Kubra Khan | Pennine Kennedy Films & GM Productions | |
| J U N | 17 | Umro Ayyar – A New Beginning | Azfar Jafri | Usman Mukhtar - Faran Tahir - Sanam Saeed - Ali Kazmi | VR Chili Production | |

== July–September ==
| Opening | | Title | Director | Cast | Production company | Ref. |
|---|---|---|---|---|---|---|
| J U L | 26 | The Glassworker | Usman Riaz | Art Malik / Khaled Anam - Sacha Dhawan / Mooroo - Anjli Mohindra / Mariam Riaz Paracha - Tony Jayawardena / Ameed Riaz - Teresa Gallagher / Mahum Moazzam - Mina Anwar / Faiza Kazi - Sham Ali / Dino Ali | Khizer Riaz Manuel Cristóbal | |
| A U G | 9 | Leech | M Shahzad Malik | Naveed Raza; Mahsam Raza; Rashid Farooqi; Kinza Malik; Adeela Khan | Glamora Films | |
| A U G | 16 | Sanak | Hassan Fareed | Shyraa Roy - Muneeb Ali - Zubair Shariq | Roy Motion Pictures | |
| A U G | 23 | Mastaani | Usman Rizvi | Affan Waheed; Aamna Ilyas | Daniya Nizami | |

== October–December ==
| Opening | | Title | Director | Cast | Studio (production house) | Ref. |
|---|---|---|---|---|---|---|
| D E C | 20 | Kattar Karachi | Abdul Wali Baloch | Imran Ashraf; Talha Anjum; Kinza Hashmi | Kattar Karachi Productions | |

== See also ==
- List of highest-grossing Pakistani films
- List of highest-grossing films in Pakistan
- Lists of Pakistani films
