= 24th Lux Style Awards =

24th Style Lux Awards ceremony

- Native name: چوبیسواں دوره جوایز انداز لکس
- Sponsored by: Unilever Pakistan
- Date: 11 December 2025
- Location: Karachi
- Country: Pakistan
- Hosted by: Sanam Saeed; Sheheryar Munawar

Highlights
- Most awards: Kabhi Main Kabhi Tum (5)
- Most nominations: Kabhi Main Kabhi Tum (8)
- Best Film: Nayab
- Best Television Play: Kabhi Main Kabhi Tum
- Song of the Year: "Jhol" - Coke Studio
- Fashion Model of the Year - Male: Erica Robin
- Fashion Model of the Year - Female: Yasser Dar
- Website: https://www.luxstyle.pk/

Television/radio coverage
- Network: Geo Entertainment
- Runtime: 94 min
- Produced by: Geo Entertainment

The 24th Lux Style Awards was an award ceremony presented by Lux to honour the best in fashion, music, films and 2024 in Pakistani television, which took place on 11 December 2025 in Karachi, Pakistan. The ceremony was hosted by Sanam Saeed and Sheheryar Munawar. The event featured 28 categories of viewers' and critics' choice awards alongside a lifetime achievement for extraordinary contributions.

Nayab led the ceremony among the films by winning two awards while Kabhi Main Kabhi Tum won four awards, highest for any television production.

The event was originally set to be held in April but cancelled for safety reasons, which had explained the digital format chosen for the precedent ceremony in 2024.

The Current noted: "Unlike previous extravagant editions, this year's awards took a more modest approach, with organizers inviting celebrities, nominees, media personalities, and select influencers rather than hosting a lavish ceremony".

The event in its 'scaled-down format' was held in Karachi in the Mohatta Palace.

== Winners and Nominees ==
The submissions were announced the third week of November with final nominations being announced on 3 December 2025. Winners were announced later that month.

=== Film ===
Film Actor of the Year - Male	Film Actor of the Year - Female
Samar Jafri - Na Baligh Afraad; Imran Ashraf - Kattar Karachi; Talha Anjum - Kattar Karachi; Usama Khan - Nayab	Yumna Zaidi - Nayab; Ayesha Omar - Taxali Gate; Kinza Hashmi - Kattar Karachi; Kubra Khan - Abhi
Film of the Year	Film Director of the Year
Kattar Karachi; Glassworker; Na Baligh Afraad; Nayab	Umair Nasir Ali - Nayab; Abdul Wali Baloch - Kattar Karachi; M. Shahzad Malik - Leech; Wajahat Rauf - Daghabaaz Dil

=== Drama ===
Viewers' Choice	Critics' Choice
Actor of the Year - Female	Best Ensemble Play
Hania Amir - Kabhi Main Kabhi Tum; Durefishan Saleem - Ishq Murshid; Durefishan Saleem - Khaie; Sajal Aly - Zard Patton Ka Bunn	Zard Patton Ka Bunn (Hum TV); Duniyapur (Green Entertainment); Kabhi Main Kabhi Tum (ARY Digital); Noor Jahan ( ARY Digital)
Actor of the Year - Male	Emerging Talent of the Year
Fahad Mustafa - Kabhi Main Kabhi Tum; Bilal Abbas - Ishq Murshid; Danish Taimoor - Jaan Nisar; Imran Ashraf - Namak Haram	Khushhal Khan - Duniyapur; Naeema Butt - Inspector Sabiha; Sahar Hashmi - Zulm; Shaheera Jalil AlBasit - Burns Road kay Romeo Juliet
Best Original Soundtrack	Television Director of the Year
Chal Diye Tum Kahan - Kabhi Main Kabhi Tum; Iqtidar; Sajna Da Dil Torya - Kabhi Main Kabhi Tum; Zard Patton Ka Bunn	Saife Hasan - Zard Patton Ka Bunn; Badar Mehmood - Kabhi Main Kabhi Tum; Musaddiq Malek - Noor Jahan; Syed Wajahat Hussain - Khaie
Best Television Long Serial	Television Play of the Year
Baby Baji Ki Bahuain (ARY Digital); Adawat (ARY Digital); Hasrat (ARY Digital); Tark e Wafa (ARY Digital)	Khaie (Geo Entertainment); Ishq Murshid (Hum TV); Jafaa (Hum TV); Zard Patton Ka Bunn (Hum TV)
Play of the Year	Television Play Writer of the Year
Kabhi Main Kabhi Tum (ARY Digital); Ishq Murshid (Hum TV); Kaffara (Geo Entertainment); Khaie (Geo Entertainment)	Mustafa Afridi - Zard Patton Ka Bunn; Farhat Ishtiaq - Kabhi Main Kabhi Tum; Saqlain Abbas - Khaie; Zanjabeel Asim Shah - Noor Jahan

=== Music ===
Artist of the Year	Emerging Artist of the Year
TBA; Hamza Malik ft. Laiba Khurram - "LOCO"; Hasan Raheem - "Radha"; Sarim Saeed - "Haal"; Talha Anjum - "Departure Lane"	TBA; Junaid Kamran Siddique - "Sada Ashna"; Nayyab - "Dil Wali Gall"; Nayyab - "Maa"; Yamna Irfan and Haadi Uppal - "Jaaniye"
Song of the Year	Music Producer of the Year
"Jhol" - Coke Studio; "Sadqay" - Aashir Wajahat, NAYEL, Nehaal Naseem; "LOCO" - Hamza Malik ft. Laiba Khurram; "Sada Ashna" - Junaid Kamran Siddique	TBA; Abbas Ali Khan - "Mera Sara Tu"; Nayyab & Ahad John - "Tenu Pyar"; Shabi - "Aisa Ho Na Jaye"; Shabi - "Bechara"

=== Fashion ===
Emerging Talent of the year	Fashion Model of the Year Female	Fashion Model of the Year Male
TBA; Muhammad Ali; Yasoob Rehman; Zunaish Shaikh	Erica Robin; Jaweria Ali; Maleena Mansoor; Sona Rafia	Yasser Dar; Abid BanGash; Adnan Behrani; Suleman Hussain
Fashion Photographer of the Year	Fashion Stylist of the Year	Make up Artist of the Year
TBA; Asad Muhammad Suleman; Avaz Anis Khan; HM Studio; MHM Studio	TBA; Arinda Tul Noor; Hafsa Farooq; Rao Ali Khan; Yasser Dar	TBA; Arshad Khan; Hussain Babar; Shainal Pervaiz; Syed Hussain
Fashion Brand of the Year (Pret) - Viewers' Choice
HSY; Ansab Jahangir; Humayun Alamgir; Kanwal Malik

=== Digital ===
Digital Beauty Influencer of the Year	Digital Content Creator of the Year	Digital Trendsetter of the Year
Hira Faisal; Duaa Fatima; Hemayal; Sabeena Syed	Ron And Coco; Junaid Akram; Kanwal Aftab; Zulgarnain Sikandar	Aidah Sheikh; Dr Zee Khan; Hemayal; Zainab Raza

== Reception ==
While writing for the Dawn, Maliha Rehman praised the ceremony for its star power, with many notable celebrities attending, and for delivering memorable performances, such as Abida Parveen's and the combined act of young musicians, event's location at the Mohatta Palace Museum; however, the ceremony was criticised for its lacklustre hosting by Sheheryar Munawar Siddiqui and Sanam Saeed, and for the poor comic segment featuring Sarmad Khoosat and Faiza Saleem and the show's repetitive focus on social media and online trolls was also seen as tedious.
