= Khush Naseebi =

2026 Pakistani television series

- Genre: Family drama; Romance
- Written by: Sameena Nazir
- Directed by: Ali Jaffri
- Starring: Javed Sheikh; Munazzah Arif; Osama Tahir; Tuba Anwar; Ahmed Rafique; Rimha Ahmed; Tehzeeb Shaheryar; Ahmed Randhawa; Dania Enwer
- Country of origin: Pakistan
- Original language: Urdu
- No. of seasons: 1
- No. of episodes: 65

Production
- Producers: Arslan Zeeshan; Badar Mehmood
- Production company: Geo Entertainment

Original release
- Network: Geo Entertainment
- Release: 24 March – 27 May 2026

Khush Naseebi (also spelled Khushbaseebi) is a 2026 Pakistani television series produced for Geo Entertainment. Written by Sameena Nazir and directed by Ali Jaffri, the series stars Javed Sheikh, Munazzah Arif, Osama Tahir, Rimha Ahmed and Dania Enwer.

== Plot ==
The story follows Siraj Qasmi, a widower and father of three daughters, Narmeen, Maheen and Emaan. He shares a close relationship with his elder daughters but struggles to accept his youngest daughter, Emaan, whom he blames for the death of his wife.

Their neighbour Humayun, a hardworking tailor, secretly loves Narmeen but considers himself unworthy of her. The story explores family relationships, love and personal struggles as the characters navigate their lives.

== Cast ==
- Javed Sheikh as Siraj Qasmi
- Munazzah Arif as Mona
- Osama Tahir as Humayun
- Tuba Anwar as Narmeen
- Ahmed Rafique as Nihal
- Rimha Ahmed as Maheen
- Tehzeeb Shaheryar as Emaan
- Ahmed Randhawa as Talha
- Dania Enwer as Gul Rukh
