= Mohsin Abbas Haider =

Pakistani actor (born 1986)

- Born: Faisalabad, Punjab, Pakistan
- Occupations: Actor; Singer-songwriter; Music composer; Poet; Host
- Years active: 2005–present
- Spouse: Fatima Sohail (m. 2015–2019)
- Children: 2

Mohsin Abbas Haider (Urdu: محسن عباس حیدر) is a Pakistani actor, singer-songwriter, music composer, poet and television presenter. He is the recipient of a Lux Style Award from five nominations. Haider is best known for his acting roles in the successful films Na Maloom Afraad (2014), and Baaji (2019), and in the television productions Mazaaq Raat (2013–2019) and Meri Guriya (2018).

As a writer, he has co-written the script of the film Load Wedding (2018), has written and sung several of his films songs, and has also contributed his vocals for the song Uddi Jaa, that he wrote and also composed, for the musical show Coke Studio (2016).

== Early life and career ==
Haider started his career as radio jockey at a radio station in Faisalabad, and, in 2005, moved to Karachi in order to learn the art of singing and sharpen his skills at the National Academy of Performing Arts (NAPA), formally trained by Ustad Salamat Ali, ultimately launching himself in Punjabi folk music in 2009.

== Career ==
=== Music ===
In 2012 he released his debut song Beparwah Dhola, written and composed by his late maternal uncle Riaz Anjum, while the song video was directed by Nabeel Qureshi. The same year Mohsin was nominated for Best Radio Jockey at the Pakistan Media Awards. He also appeared in several TV shows as a host and as a voice over artist during this time.

In 2016, he featured in Coke Studio season 9 and sung Uddi Ja, also written as well composed by himself, which was warmly appreciated by the public.

In 2019 he sang, wrote and composed a song Na Jaa with his friend Sohail Haider. He won Best Singer of the Year award for this song in Lux Style Awards in 2019. In December of the same year, he released a song Rooh written, sung and composed by him.

=== DJ ===
From 2013 to 2019 he was a DJ in the Dunya News talk show Mazaaq Raat, where he has, as of April 2018, performed more than 1,500 songs in different genres (ghazals, filmi, naats, etc.).

=== Acting ===
In 2014, he made his debut in cinema with the comedy-drama Na Maloom Afraad, playing the lead role of a quirky guy opposite Fahad Mustafa and Javaid Sheikh as fellow lead roles.

In 2017, he appeared in Na Maloom Afraad 2, where he had the lead role as well as writing two songs and singing one, Heerey.

In 2018 he had a special appearance in Load Wedding, for which he wrote the lyrics for two songs, while singing one of them, Munday Lahore De. During the same year, he starred in the drama Meri Guriya, where he plays the antagonist, a child rapist and murderer, and earned critical appreciation for his acting performance.

== Personal life ==
Haider married Fatema Sohail in 2015 shortly after meeting her. In December 2017, the couple lost their newborn daughter, Mahveen Abbas Haider, seven weeks after her birth. In May 2019, the couple had a son, Haider Abbas Mohsin. His wife accused him of severe domestic violence and shared photos of her bruised face online; their divorce was finalized in 2019.

== Filmography ==
=== Television ===
Year	Show	Role	Channel	Notes
2005–2013	4 Man Show	Various roles	Aaj News	Television debut, with comedy and mimicry
2011	Banana News Network	Bhagat Singh	Geo TV	
2013–2019	Mazaaq Raat	DJ	Dunya News	
2015	Ishq For Sale	Ahsan	Hum TV	Telefilm
2016–2017	Muqabil	Armaan	ARY Digital	
2017	Meeras	Haris	ARY Digital	
2018	Lashkara	Fika	ARY Digital	
2018	Meri Guriya	Dabeer	ARY Digital	
2019	Choti Choti Batain	Akash	Hum TV	Episode: "Mujhay Tum Pasand Ho"
2019	Deewar-e-Shab	Faiz Ali	Hum TV	Cameo appearance
2020–2021	Ghamandi	Galib	Express Entertainment	
2020–2021	Dil Tanha Tanha	Adeel	Hum TV	
2021	Baddua	Mohsin	ARY Digital	
2021	Mohabbat Chor Di Maine	Omer	Geo Entertainment	
2022	Jo Na Mil Sakay	Kumail	Aaj Entertainment	
2022	Siyani	Zarbab	Geo Entertainment	
2022	Sevak: The Confessions	Diljeet	Vidly	Web-series
2023	Sirf Tum	Hamza Faraz	Geo Entertainment	
2024	Tauba	Shahjahan/Shani	Geo Entertainment	
2025	Ishq Mubarak	Ayan	Set Entertainment	
2026	Milkiyat	Zaviyar	Geo Entertainment	

=== Films ===
Year	Film	Role	Notes	Ref.
2014	Na Maloom Afraad	Moon	Also lyricist and singer of "Sapno Ki Mala" and "Goli Teeti Main"	
2016	Teri Meri Love Story	Sherry		
2017	Na Maloom Afraad 2	Moon	Also lyricist for two songs and singer of "Heerey"	
2018	Load Wedding	Young Khalil	Also co-writer, lyricist for two songs and singer of "Munday Lahore Day"	
2019	Baaji	Aji		
2023	Daadal	Jibran aka "Jabbru"		
2023	Super Punjabi	Sakhi Jutt		
2023	Once Upon a Time in Karachi	Nasir		
2026	Zombeid			

== Discography ==
=== Singles ===
- 2012 Bay Parwah Dhola
- 2014 Sapno Ki Maala (Na Maloom Afraad)
- 2016 Uddi Jaa (Coke Studio season 9)
- 2017 Heerey (Na Maloom Afraad 2)
- 2018 Munday Lahore Day (Load Wedding)
- 2019 Na Jaa
- 2019 Rooh
- 2021 Kamli ft. Shyraa Roy
