= Load Wedding =

2018 Pakistani film by Nabeel Qureshi

- Film poster
- Directed by: Nabeel Qureshi
- Written by: Fizza Ali Meerza; Nabeel Qureshi; Mohsin Abbas Haider
- Produced by: Fizza Ali Meerza; Mehdi Ali
- Starring: Fahad Mustafa; Mehwish Hayat; Samina Ahmed; Faiza Hasan
- Narrated by: Qaiser Piya
- Cinematography: Rana Kamran
- Edited by: Asif Mumtaz
- Music by: Shani Arshad
- Production companies: Filmwala Pictures; Geo Films
- Distributed by: IMGC; Zee Studios
- Release date: 22 August 2018 (Eid al-Adha)
- Running time: 135 minutes
- Country: Pakistan
- Languages: Urdu; Punjabi
- Budget: Rs. 6 crore (US$210,000)
- Box office: Rs. 13.50 crore (US$480,000)

Load Wedding is a 2018 Pakistani socio-comedy romantic film, which is directed by Nabeel Qureshi and co-written and co-produced by Fizza Ali Meerza under the banner of Filmwala Pictures. The film stars Fahad Mustafa and Mehwish Hayat in lead roles. Released on Eid al-Adha; 22 August 2018, it was distributed by IMGC and Geo Films nationwide, and by Zee Studios internationally.

== Cast ==
- Fahad Mustafa as Raja
  - Sadoon as young Raja
- Mehwish Hayat as Meerab "Meeru" Khurram
  - Hamna Amir as young Meeru
- Samina Ahmad as Raja's Mother
- Faiza Hasan as Farhana "Baby Baji"; Raja's sister
- Noor ul Hassan as Khalil; Raja's uncle
  - Mohsin Abbas Haider as young Khalil (special appearance)
- Qaiser Piya as Nazeer; Raja's best friend
  - Fahad Khan as young Nazeer
- Fahim Khan as Aashiq Rafaqat; TV show host
- Hania Amir as young Khalil's love interest (special appearance)
- Shanzay Khan as Meeru's sister
- Mohammed Ehteshamuddin as Meeru's brother-in-law
- Ghazala Butt as Anam
- Om Puri as Raja's late father (tribute)
- Anjum Habibi
- Ghalib Kamal
- Kehkashan Faisal
- Ijaz
- Razia Malik

== Production ==
Fahad Mustafa hinted at the film in February 2017. The film was announced on 8 December. This will be his fourth collaboration with director-producer duo Nabeel Qureshi and Fizza Ali Meerza. Qureshi stated that he feels most comfortable working with him, and the film would be different from his previous three films. "There are a lot of things that I and Fizza believe in and we are trying to say them," he told Gulf News.

This was Mehwish Hayat's third collaboration with the three of them, including 2016 film Actor in Law. She commented on the film that it "tackles social issues prevalent in our society that need to be highlighted", for which her character is different from her previous ones, she said it as "a very traditional desi role". Meerza commented that they are "truly one of the finest actors our industry has". She said that the film explains "the load that comes" in the society "with the wedding". Mustafa shared with The News, "two of the biggest filmmakers in the country want to work with me and release their films at the same time", where he talked about this film and Nadeem Baig's Jawani Phir Nahi Ani 2.

On 13 July, HIP reported that Mohsin Abbas Haider has co-written the film, as well as written the lyrics for two songs and has sung one of them.

== Release ==
Film teaser was released on 27 June, and the trailer on 17 July. The film was premiered on 18 August in Lahore, on 19 August in Dubai and on 21 August in Karachi. It was released on Eid al-Adha worldwide on 22 August 2018, and on 23 August in UAE.

Despite getting mostly positive reviews, the film could not manage to do well business at the box office due to very limited number of screens it got, as compared to the competitor films Jawani Phir Nahi Ani 2 of ARY Films and Parwaaz Hai Junoon of Hum Films. The director Nabeel Qureshi called it "unfair distribution", while the cinemas' management said that the "public demand" was on priority. Geo Films was also blamed for not promoting the film correctly, as others were doing.

== Reception ==
=== Critical reception ===
Amna Karim writing for Bolo Jawan gave the film 4 out of 5 stars, appreciating Nabeel Qureshi for bringing a socially responsible narrative to Pakistani cinema. Shahjehan Saleem of Something Haute rated the film 4 out 5 stars and said, "the film does suffer from a few hiccups", however, these are not "big enough to affect the narrative", because set on "family problems", it has "the stars along with substance and soul". Omair Alavi rated 3.5 stars out of 5 and praised, "Everything from art direction to dialogues to actors' accent is perfect", adding that the social message is something to ponderthe audience. Sonia Ashraf wrote to DAWN Images praised the film due to the message in love story and most of the characters, but criticized the script length. Rahul Aijaz of The Express Tribune rated 2 out of 5 stars and said that despite the "strong message" about "social mockery" of marriage concept, the film "fails to be an up-to-the-mark film for multiple reasons."

=== International screening ===
The film was screened at the 2019 Jaipur International Film Festival, and was nominated in the category of Best Film. It was also screened at the 2019 Rajasthan International Film Festival, and it won in the category of Best Feature Film International.

=== Home media ===
The film had its television premiere on 16 February 2019 on Geo Entertainment, and it was premiered on YouTube on 27 February.

=== Digital release ===
The film was made available on Amazon Prime Video to stream online.

== Accolades ==
Ceremony	Won	Nominated
18th Lux Style Awards	Fahad Mustafa – Best Actor (Critics' choice); Mehwish Hayat – Best Actress (Viewers' choice)	Filmwala Pictures – Best Film; Nabeel Qureshi – Best Director; Mulazim Hussain, Missal Zaidi for "Rangeya" – Best Playback Singer

== Soundtrack ==
Load Wedding

Soundtrack album by Shani Arshad
- Released: 1 August 2018
- Genre: Feature film soundtrack
- Length: 18:18
- Languages: Urdu; English; Punjabi
- Label: Zee Music

Shani Arshad chronology
Na Maloom Afraad 2 (2017)	Load Wedding (2018)	Quaid-e-Azam Zindabad (2022)
External audio
- Audio jukebox on YouTube

Like previous films for the director-producer-duo, this time also the music has been composed by Shani Arshad. The soundtrack album was released on 1 August 2018 by Zee Music Company.

No.	Title	Lyrics	Singer(s)	Length
1.	"Rangeya"	Shani Arshad	Mulazim Hussain, Missal Zaidi	4:00
2.	"Kooch Na Karin"	Haleem Jalandari	Azhar Abbas	4:36
3.	"Munday Lahore De"	Mohsin Abbas Haider, Shani Arshad	Mohsin Abbas Haider, Saima Jahan	4:14
4.	"Good Luck"	Mohsin Abbas Haider	Asrar, Tehreem Muniba	2:34
5.	"Faqeera"	Sabir Zafar	Shani Arshad	2:54
Total length:				18:18

== See also ==
- List of Pakistani films of 2018
