= Raja London Ka =

2026 Pakistani television series

- Genre: Drama
- Written by: Shahid Dogar
- Directed by: Fajr Raza
- Starring: Samar Jafri; Ameema Saleem Khan; Zaviyar Nauman Ijaz
- Country of origin: Pakistan
- Original language: Urdu

Production
- Producer: Misbah Shafique

Original release
- Network: Express Entertainment
- Release: 1 June 2026

Raja London Ka is a Pakistani television drama series written by Shahid Dogar and directed by Fajr Raza. The series stars Samar Jafri, Ameema Saleem Khan and Zaviyar Nauman Ijaz in leading roles, alongside Shagufta Ejaz and Arjumand Rahim. It premiered on Express Entertainment on 1 June 2026.

== Plot ==
The story follows Raja, a young shopkeeper who manages his family's business in Karachi's Landa Bazaar. As the family's primary provider, he hopes to improve their financial circumstances and fulfil his ambitions of going to London. He also struggles with the negative reputation left behind by an incident involving his late father.

The narrative runs alongside the story of Adil Sultan, the son of a politician who returns from England following his father's death. Adil attempts to continue his father's public projects while dealing with opposition from relatives and political rivals.

Their lives intersect through Rania Mirza, whose association with the people of Landa Bazaar brings her closer to Raja. The resulting relationships develop into a romantic conflict involving the three central characters.

== Cast ==
- Samar Jafri as Raja
- Ameema Saleem Khan as Rania Mirza
- Zaviyar Nauman Ijaz as Adil Sultan
- Shagufta Ejaz as Asifa
- Arjumand Rahim as Mahnoor Begum
- Yousuf Bashir Qureshi as Munawwar Mirza
- Saife Hassan as Sultan Ali Khan
- Saleem Mairaj as Rifat Rangeela
- Sameer Sohail
- Elena Jaffri as Nida
- Sabahat Adil
- Ayisha Afridi
- Ali Wasi Kazmi
- Sarah Ijaz Khan
- Ehtesham Khan
- Qasim Raza
- Munawar Saeed
- Fawad Masroor

== Production ==
The series was written by Shahid Dogar and directed by Fajr Raza. Before its release, the project was promoted as a romantic thriller with an emphasis on cinematic presentation. The director's approach included visual distinctions between the different social environments represented in the story.

In an interview with Dawn, Fajr Raza discussed the visual direction of the serial, including the use of contrasting settings and colour schemes to distinguish the characters' worlds. He also described the production challenges associated with bringing a cinematic approach to Pakistani television.
