= The Glassworker =

2024 Pakistani hand-drawn animated film

- Theatrical release poster
- Directed by: Usman Riaz
- Screenplay by: Moya O’Shea
- Story by: Usman Riaz; Moya O'Shea
- Produced by: Khizer Riaz; Manuel Cristóbal
- Starring: see below
- Cinematography: Usman Riaz
- Edited by: Jose Manuel Jimenez
- Music by: Usman Riaz; Carmine Diflorio
- Production company: Mano Animation Studios
- Distributed by: Geo Films; Mandviwalla Entertainment
- Release dates: 10 June 2024 (Annecy); 26 July 2024 (Pakistan)
- Running time: 99 minutes
- Country: Pakistan
- Language: Urdu
- Box office: Rs. 30 million

The Glassworker (Urdu: شیشہ گر, romanized: Sheesha Gar) is a 2024 Pakistani animated anti-war romantic drama film produced by Mano Animation Studios. The film is directed by Usman Riaz (in his directorial debut) with a screenplay by Moya O'Shea from a story by O'Shea and Riaz. The film is produced by Khizer Riaz and Manuel Cristóbal. Featuring anime-influenced animation, it is Pakistan's first hand-drawn animated feature film.

The film premiered at the 2024 Annecy International Animation Film Festival on 10 June and was released in theatres in Pakistan on 26 July 2024. The Glassworker was selected as Pakistan's entry for the Best International Feature Film at the 97th Academy Awards, but was not nominated.

== Plot ==
Vincent Oliver, the son of master glassworker Tomas Oliver, lives in the seaside town of Waterfront, renowned for its fertile soil and silicon-rich sand. The town becomes a battleground between two nations. Djinns, fire spirits, play a significant role in the story.

As an adult, Vincent prepares for his first glasswork exhibition and finds a letter from his childhood friend, Alliz Amano, whom he always loved. The letter recounts their past: Vincent, home-schooled and trained in glassworking by his pacifist father, meets Alliz, the daughter of Colonel Amano. Alliz aspires to be a violinist, and despite Tomas’s disapproval, Vincent and Alliz grow close.

War breaks out, and locals, including Vincent’s rival Malik, join the military. Tomas is coerced into making advanced glass rectifiers for the military. As the war escalates, Malik confesses his love for Alliz, creating tension between her and Vincent. During a bombing raid, Vincent and Alliz argue, leading to their estrangement.

Alliz’s father goes missing in action, prompting her to find solace in music and write her own piece. She invites Vincent to her performance, but he is barred entry and watches from the roof. Seeing soldiers approach the college, Vincent leaves to confront them. Inside, Malik returns with the injured Colonel Amano, earning Alliz’s gratitude and a kiss, which Vincent witnesses.

Devastated, Vincent sabotages the rectifiers to stop the war but regrets it. During a bombing raid, Vincent’s actions inadvertently cause Tomas to lose his arm. Alliz and her family members are killed as they get caught in a bombing while departing by train.

In the present, Vincent finishes reading Alliz’s letter, where she professes her love for him. At his glass exhibition, Vincent is distracted by a blue flame, a recurring motif. Back at the workshop, he attempts to burn the letter, but blue flames transform it into a vision of Alliz. The film ends with Vincent and Alliz reunited on the beach, their hands joined by a blue flame.

== Cast ==
Character	Voice Actor(s)	
Character	Urdu	English
Tomas Oliver	Khaled Anam	Art Malik
Vincent Oliver	Mooroo Mahum Moazzam^{Y}	Sacha Dhawan Teresa Gallagher^{Y}
Alliz Amano	Mariam Riaz Paracha	Anjli Mohindra
Colonel Amano	Ameed Riaz	Tony Jayawardena
Nadia Amano	Faiza Kazi	Mina Anwar
Malik Khan	Dino Ali	Sham Ali
Penni	Aysha Sheikh	Maya Saroya
Principal Bhatti	Usman Riaz	Nila Aalia
Professor Ansari	Khalifa Sajeeruddin	Alex Jordan
Mrs. Popolzai	Aysha Sheikh	Bex Wood

== Production ==
The Glassworker was directed by Usman Riaz, in his directorial debut, and produced by Mano Animation Studios. Geoffrey Wexler, who worked for Studio Ghibli, aided the film's production. It was edited by José Manuel Jiménez and its score composed by Carmine Di Florio.

== Release ==
The film premiered worldwide at the 2024 Annecy International Animation Film Festival on 10 June 2024 and was released in Pakistani theaters on 26 July 2024, distributed by Geo Films and Mandviwalla Entertainment. It also screened at the Hiroshima Animation Season 2024 on 17 August 2024 and competed in Feature Competition. The film premiered in Canada at the Toronto Reel Asian Film Festival. In May 2025, Watermelon Pictures acquired the U.S. distribution rights to The Glassworker. The film premiered in the United States in theaters on August 15, 2025.

== Reception ==
=== Box office ===
The Glassworker earned Rs. 10 million in its opening weekend in Pakistan. The film earned a reported Rs. 30 million in Pakistan, while Box Office Mojo lists its worldwide gross at $88,080 from its US, UK, and Russia/CIS releases.

=== Critical response ===
On the review aggregator website Rotten Tomatoes, 88% of 24 critics' reviews are positive, with an average rating of 7.5/10.

Siddhant Adlakha of Variety wrote that the film "feels like an homage to Miyazaki", praising its hand-drawn animation and visual ambition, while noting that its storytelling is weighed down by familiar themes and a heavy emotional approach.

Mohammad Kamran Jawaid of Dawn praised the animation, story, and the film's anti-war message. He further wrote, "Usman Riaz’s The Glassworker is a visually stunning but thematically heavy film about love and relationships that chooses reality over fantasy." Alizee Ali Khan, of Aaj News praised the film, stating that “the story is about the lives of two characters, Vincent Oliver and Alliz Amano, who are inextricably linked to each other while the whirlwind of an approaching war engulfs them. ‘The Glassworker’ treats the subjects of life and love delicately without losing their depth, with magnificent imagery and a well-written story.”

Ricardo Gallegos of La Estatuilla wrote, "Overall, the animation delivers what it promises, but at the character level it is not always completely polished, as there is no fluidity and definition in certain movements. These imperfections also appear in the dubbing department, as some cast members are too monotonous in their performance and therefore fail to convey the emotion of their characters, especially during key scenes."

== Accolades ==
Award	Ceremony date	Category	Recipient(s)	Result	Ref.
Guadalajara International Film Festival	June 2024	Official Competition / Official Selection	The Glassworker	Selected	
Annecy International Animation Film Festival	15 June 2024	Contrechamp Grand Prix	The Glassworker	Nominated	
Shanghai International Film Festival	22 June 2024	Golden Goblet Award for Best Animation Film	The Glassworker	Nominated	
Hiroshima Animation Season	August 2024	Feature Competition – Official Selection	The Glassworker	Selected	
Sitges Film Festival	13 October 2024	Best Animated Feature Film	The Glassworker	Nominated	
Valladolid International Film Festival	26 October 2024	Seminci Joven Award for Best Feature Film	The Glassworker	Nominated	
São Paulo International Film Festival	October 2024	New Directors Competition for Best Fiction	The Glassworker	Nominated	
Toronto Reel Asian International Film Festival	November 2024	Best First Feature Award	The Glassworker	Won	
UK Asian Film Festival	11 May 2025	Tongues on Fire Flame Award for Best Debut Director	Usman Riaz	Won	
Film Club's The Lost Weekend	20 September 2025	Lost Weekend Award for Best Animated Feature	The Glassworker	2nd Place	
Film Club's The Lost Weekend	20 September 2025	Best Story	The Glassworker	Nominated	
Lux Style Awards	11 December 2025	Film of the Year (Viewers' Choice)	The Glassworker	Nominated	

== See also ==
- List of Pakistani films of 2024
- List of Pakistani animated films
- Pakistani art
- List of submissions to the 97th Academy Awards for Best International Feature Film
- List of Pakistani submissions for the Academy Award for Best International Feature Film
