= Dusri Biwi =

Pakistani drama series

- Promotional poster
- Also known as: English: second wife
- Genre: Romance
- Written by: Samina Ejaz
- Directed by: Anjum Shahzad
- Starring: Fahad Mustafa; Maha Warsi; Hareem Farooq
- Composer: Ahmed Jahanzaib
- Country of origin: Pakistan
- Original language: Urdu

Production
- Producers: Fahad Mustafa; Ali Kazmi
- Production company: Big Bang Entertainment

Original release
- Network: ARY Digital; Star Utsav
- Release: 1 December 2014 – 4 May 2015

Dusri Biwi (Urdu: دوسری بیوی, lit. 'Second Wife') is a Pakistani drama serial directed by Anjum Shahzad, written by Samina Ejaz, and produced by the lead actor Fahad Mustafa and Dr. Ali Kazmi under the production banner BigBangEntertainment.

The drama stars Fahad Mustafa, Hareem Farooq and Maha Warsi in the lead roles alongside Ahmed Ali, Shehryar Zaidi, Amber Khan, Maham, Fatima, Ali Kazmi and Zara Gull. The first episode aired on 1 December 2014 on ARY Digital. During production of the drama they used the working title Poora Chand Adhoora Hai.

The show was also aired on Star Utsav in India.

== Plot outline ==
Dusri Biwi is a romantic love triangle. Hassan is a hard-working man living a happily married life with his wife Ayesha and their daughter Saman. That was until Hassan's colleague Farah entered his life. Hassan and Farah became friends. One day Farah broke her engagement with Aamir. Hassan consoled Farah's father, and at that time, Hassan promised him that he would marry Farah. Hassan marries Farah, and the same night, he receives the news that Ayesha is pregnant with his second child. After some time, Ayesha loses her child, and Farah becomes pregnant with Hassan's first child.

Although he was a loyal and hard-working husband, falling in love was their fate. But to get married was beyond their control, and now the only common thing between both the women is their husband.

In season 2 of Dusri Biwi, Hassan marries a woman whom he met on a business trip. Hassan again hides the truth from his first and second wives.

== Cast ==
- Fahad Mustafa as Hassan
- Hareem Farooq as Ayesha
- Maha Warsi as Farah
- Ahmed Ali Akbar as Aamir
- Shehriyar Zaidi as Farah's father
- Amber Khan as Farah's mother
- Maham Amir as Fouzia/Bajo
- Fatima (Childstar) as Saman
- Dr. Ali Kazmi as Ahmed
- Zara Gull as Ayesha's sister-in-law

== Soundtrack ==
The drama's soundtrack is composed and sung by Ahmed Jahanzaib.

== Awards ==
Year	Award	Category	Recipient(s) and nominee(s)	Result
2016	Lux Style Awards	Best Original Soundtrack	Ahmed Jahnzaib	Nominated

== Trivia ==
- Fahad Mustafa announced that this drama would be his "last television commitment for some time".
