= Quaid-e-Azam Zindabad =

2022 Pakistani film by Nabeel Qureshi

- Theatrical poster
- Urdu: قائداعظم زندہ باد
- Directed by: Nabeel Qureshi
- Written by: Nabeel Qureshi; Fizza Ali Meerza
- Screenplay by: Nabeel Qureshi
- Produced by: Mehdi Ali; Fizza Ali Meerza
- Starring: Fahad Mustafa; Javed Sheikh; Mahira Khan
- Cinematography: Rana Kamran
- Edited by: Asif Mumtaz
- Music by: Shani Arshad
- Production company: Filmwala Pictures
- Distributed by: Hum Films; Eveready Pictures
- Release dates: 7 July 2022 (Middle East); 8 July 2022 (Worldwide); 10 July 2022 (Eid-ul-Adha in Pakistan)
- Running time: 142 minutes
- Country: Pakistan
- Language: Urdu
- Budget: 15crore
- Box office: Rs. 50 crore (US$1.8 million) (Note: As per a Pakistani trade analyst, Ali Zain, the film producers are quoting different numbers as being quoted by an internationally verified source Comscore/Rentrak.)

Quaid-e-Azam Zindabad (Urdu: قائداعظم زندہ باد, lit. 'Long Live Quaid-e-Azam') is a 2022 Pakistani action comedy film written by Fizza Ali Meerza and Nabeel Qureshi, directed by Nabeel Qureshi, and produced by Mehdi Ali and Fizza Ali Meerza, under the banner of Filmwala Pictures. The film stars Fahad Mustafa, Javed Sheikh and Mahira Khan with Nayyar Ejaz and Mehmood Aslam in an ensemble cast.

While the filming had been completed before the lockdown restrictions started due to the COVID-19 pandemic, post-production was done in 2020. Distributed by Hum Films and Eveready Pictures, the film was released after a two years delay on Eid al-Adha, 8 July 2022 and became a blockbuster.

The film received mixed reviews from critics with criticism for its screenplay and praise for direction. It won Best Film (Viewers' choice) at the 22nd Lux Style Awards.

== Plot ==
While performing his crime-fighting duties in Karachi, Inspector Gulab requests D.I.G. Babar to stop his promotion so he can continue collecting bribes under him, who works for Rana, a corrupt politician who owns a lion at his place. One day while on duty, Gulab encounters Jia, whose cell phone was snatched while she was rescuing pets. He recovers her cellphone as he falls for her, and starts giving her different pets for her animal shelter in an attempt to grow closer to her, but he does not seem to be interested in petting them as he loses control over her hamster.

Gulab continues to thug common peddlers and threatens some to leave the place for the VIPs who have heavily paid him bribes; most of it is kept in a secret locker at Rana's place while Gulab himself keeps some of it. Later, when Munir, Gulab's father, discovers that he secretly stores the bribes he collects in his house, Munir dies in pain that even his son has ignored the lesson he taught him 20 years ago to respect Muhammad Ali Jinnah, and has begun to follow the corrupt ones. Mourning Gulab, he still ignores the fact that his father raised him on Halal income as he preferred his will over his father's commands, so he finds Jinnah's pictures missing on Pakistani rupee notes, which his assistant, Ronaq, also notices assuming that Jinnah supervises their earnings and now he is upset about what they did. To confirm what they saw, they shared awareness about Jinnah's respect for those who had Haram income, and soon those people also find Jinnah's picture missing, including Babar and Rana; thus, their currency notes now seem fake.

As Jia gets angry after learning about Gulab's deeds, Gulab realizes all his mistakes and turns over a new leaf. He returns the money with an apology note by following the list of people his team has made. He beats an officer publicly for misbehaving with a peddler, which sparks controversy. However, he also offers his seniors, Babar and Rana, to ask Jinnah for an apology at Mazar-e-Quaid, which Rana ignores and instead requests the bill in assembly about either completely removing Jinnah's picture from the currency notes or instead start using US$. Multiple public protests rose against this act and against owning a jungle animal on his private property; the latter protest was led by Jia.

Soon, Gulab tries to seek warrants against Rana as he discloses the bribes collected. Instead, he breaks in there over Jia's complaint, after which the lion is handed over to the police, who will now safely move it to the jungle. Meanwhile, Rana tries to escape by burning his house and informing Babar; however, Gulab recovers all the money from Rana's private jet and blows the money raining in the city for common people as he gets an order from Babar who also realizes his true duty, while Gulab drowns with the jet in the Clifton Beach, Karachi. Rana is arrested and imprisoned as the police de-route him, and a revived Gulab appears there to slap Rana for his corrupt behaviors.

As Gulab gets free of this case, he witnesses Jinnah's picture reappear on his salary which he receives for the first time in a while, assuming that his father, Munir, and the Father of the Nation, Jinnah, are now happy with his acts. He accepts his promotion and with his salary, he and Jia express love for each other and propose to marry.

== Cast ==
- Fahad Mustafa as Inspector Gulab Mughal, an S.H.O. in Sindh Police
  - Usman as young Gulab Mughal
- Mahira Khan as Jia, a veterinarian, animal lover, and activist
- Jawed Sheikh as Ronaq Ali, a Sindhi constable who is Gulab's assistant
- Mehmood Aslam as Babar Jilani, Deputy Inspector General of Sindh Police, Gulab's senior
- Nayyar Ejaz as Rana Kamran, a corrupt politician
- Qavi Khan as Munir Mughal, Gulab's father who is a retired inspector
  - Faiq Khan as young Munir Mughal, an honest police inspector
- Irfan Motiwala as Saleem, a faithful sub-inspector
- Beo Raana Zafar as a food cart owner who sells bun kebabs
- Sami Khan as Jia's friend
- Hina Rizvi as Lady Constable
- Hani Taha as Politician
- Saleem Mairaj as a corrupt sub-inspector, Cameo Appearance
- Nabeel Qureshi, special appearance in the song "Loota Rey"
- Faryal Mehmood as a TikToker, special appearance

== Production ==
The film title and genre were announced on 26 August 2019 by Filmwala Pictures' duo Nabeel Qureshi and Fizza Ali Meerza, with Fahad Mustafa joining on 18 September while Mahira Khan on 22 October. While this is Mustafa's fifth collaboration with the filmmakers, Khan joined the team for the first time as a lead for this film as she had few other options with them too. Filming took place in Karachi from December 2019 and wrapped on 15 February 2020 with more than 50 days of principal photography.

Initially planned for release on Eid al-Adha, August 2020, the film then went into the post-production phase, but the release got delayed due to the COVID-19 pandemic in Pakistan as the filmmakers refused to release it digitally due to being a big-budget film. The lead character posters were revealed on 14 August 2020.

Mustafa did most of the stunts himself and endured multiple injuries, including the serious one in his heel, and he did not allow the stunt double as he plays a corrupt cop; the film title is the term used to define the act of bribery, a social issue in Pakistan. Khan especially learnt to ride a bike for the film as she plays an animal lover; to define her character, different animals were in this film, including lion, dogs, parrot, hamster, donkey, crocodile, and snake; all the animals were taken care by Azlan Shah, an animal enthusiast. The film went through three different studios for VFX; Artlab, Sharp Image, and Postistan. The teaser, released on 17 October, announced the film release to be on Jinnah's Birthday weekend, 25 December 2020, but it got postponed once again due to the policies by the National Command and Operation Center until the next decision in October 2021.

== Soundtrack ==
Quaid-e-Azam Zindabad

Soundtrack album by Shani Arshad
- Released: 8 July 2022
- Recorded: 2019–21
- Length: 13:37
- Language: Urdu
- Labels: Filmwala; Hum

Shani Arshad chronology
Load Wedding (2018)	Quaid-e-Azam Zindabad (2022)
External audio
- EP on iTunes

The song "Loota Rey" is choreographed by Nigah Hussain; it was launched in a ceremony at Port Grand on 25 June.

All music is composed by Shani Arshad.

Original soundtrack
No.	Title	Lyrics	Singer(s)	Length
1.	"Loota Rey"	Khawaja Danish	Asrar, Aima Baig	3:50
2.	"Rab Ke Banday"	Sabir Zafar	Asrar	3:34
3.	"Dil Karey"	Sabir Zafar, Khawaja Danish	Ali Zafar, Nish Asher	3:56
4.	"Maya Rey"		Shani Arshad	2:17
Total length:				13:37

== Release ==
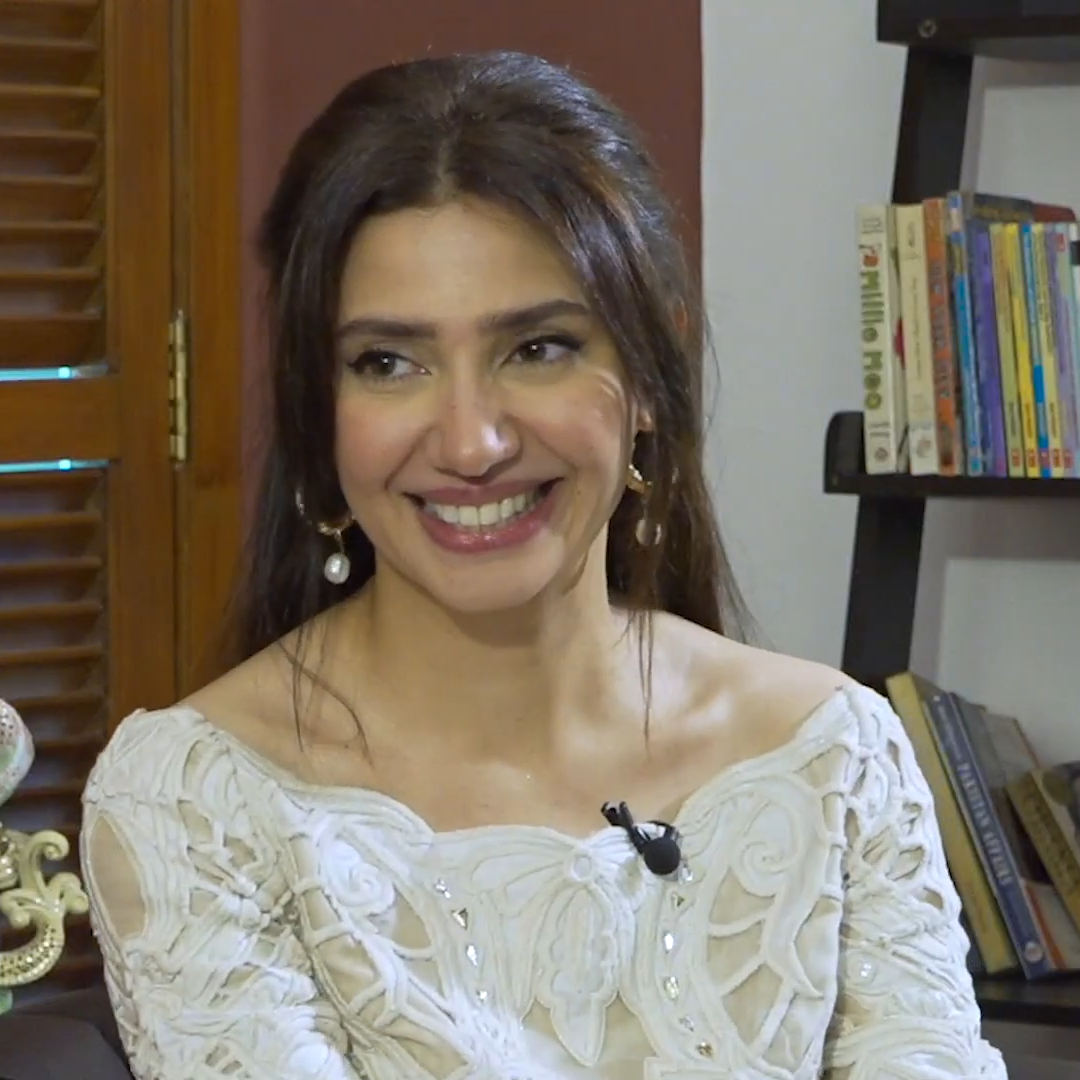
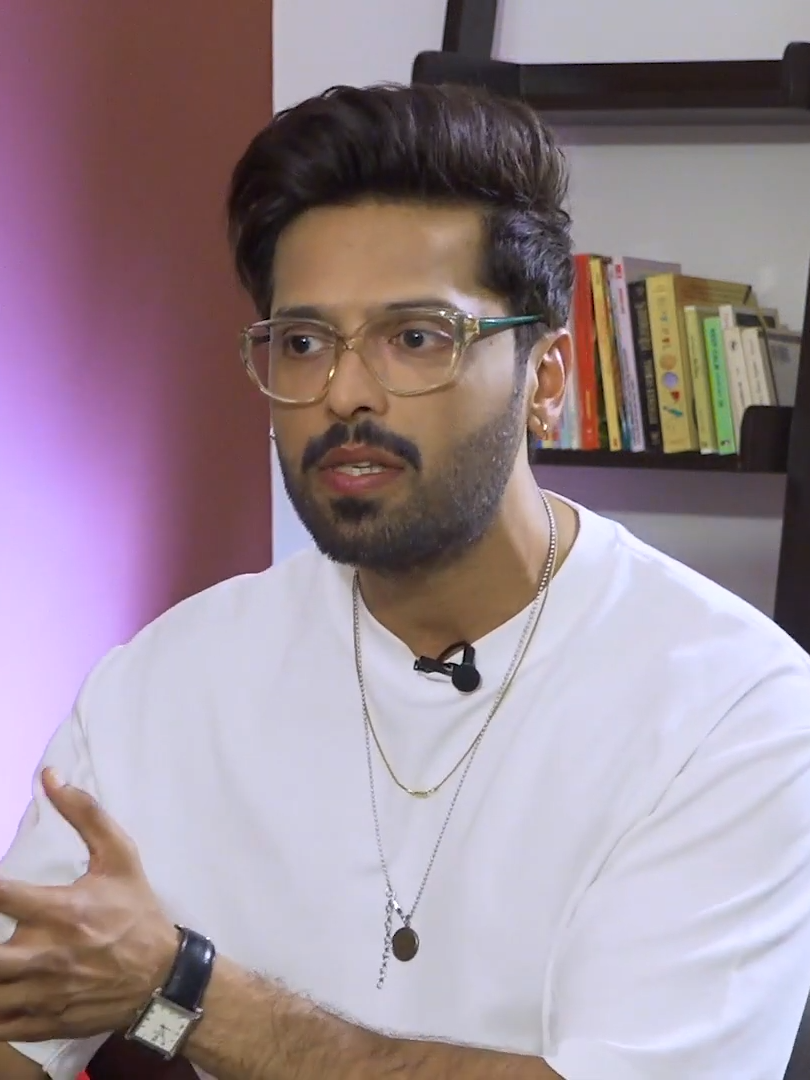
The lead cast promoting the film in 2022

The final release date was announced on 1 January 2022, and the trailer was released in a ceremony at the Arts Council of Pakistan Karachi on 9 June. The film was premiered on 5 July in Universal Cinemas, Emporium Mall, Lahore, and on 9 July in Nueplex Cinemas, DHA, Karachi. It had a worldwide release on 8 July with complete release in Pakistan on Eid al-Adha, 10 July. In UAE, it released on 7 July.

=== Home media ===
The film started digitally streaming on Vidly TV from 14 January 2023.

== Reception ==
Sadiq Saleem from Khaleej Times opined that the film is a "good watch for the festive season". Writing for The Brown Identity, Mahwash Ajaz praised the film and said that while Fahad has been made "the larger-than-life hero," the hero "is still the message". Rabia Mughni of Fuchsia Magazine praised that the film delivers "top-notch production quality" with "the above-par and well-executed action sequences", however, she criticized the climax as it "didn't evoke ample excitement". Kamran Jawaid of Dawn commented that the film "strives to be grand and entertaining but falls short of expectations". Syeda Zehra wrote for Something Haute, "The filmmakers have discovered all the right buttons for an action entertainer; now they have to work on the shortcomings to lift its appeal." Asfa Sultan commented for The Express Tribune that the film "is a thrilling watch" but its "loop-holes and lacklustre storytelling" could have been better. Fifi Haroon criticized the role of Nayyar Ejaz and the lengthy screenplay, however, she praised the romance between the leads and wanted more of it; she claimed the film to be a political parody.

== Accolades ==
Year	Awards	Category	Recipient/ nominee	Result	Ref.
6 October 2023	Lux Style Awards	Best Film (Viewers' choice)	Quaid-e-Azam Zindabad	Won	
6 October 2023	Lux Style Awards	Best Film (Critics' choice)	Quaid-e-Azam Zindabad	Nominated	
6 October 2023	Lux Style Awards	Best Film Actress	Mahira Khan	Nominated	
6 October 2023	Lux Style Awards	Best Film Actor	Fahad Mustafa	Nominated	
6 October 2023	Lux Style Awards	Best Film Song	"Loota Rey"	Nominated	

== See also ==
- List of Pakistani films of 2022
