= Khel Khel Mein (2021 film) =

2021 Pakistani film by Nabeel Qureshi

- Theatrical release poster
- Urdu: کھیل کھیل میں
- Directed by: Nabeel Qureshi
- Written by: Nabeel Qureshi; Fizza Ali Meerza
- Produced by: Fizza Ali Meerza
- Starring: Sajal Aly; Bilal Abbas Khan
- Music by: Shuja Haider Asrar Shah Majid Raza
- Production company: Filmwala Pictures
- Distributed by: ARY Films; Eveready Pictures
- Release date: 19 November 2021
- Country: Pakistan
- Language: Urdu
- Box office: Rs 6.00 crore (US$400,000)

Khel Khel Mein (transl. All in the game) is a 2021 Pakistani historical drama film directed and written by Nabeel Qureshi and produced by Fizza Ali Meerza. It stars Sajal Aly and Bilal Abbas Khan. The story of the movie is related to the separation of East Pakistan from West Pakistan in 1971. The film was theatrically released on 19 November 2021. The film revolves around a drama club in a university taking its production (based on the 1971 war that led to the breaking away of Bangladesh) to a drama festival in Dhaka.

== Plot ==
Khel Khel Mein revolves around the myths, mysteries, and mistrust after East Pakistan became Bangladesh. The film is a projection of the existing mindset and curiosity around the subject, which is interestingly knit into a journey of students exploring the history and making history by doing not the so obvious and expected, but instead following the path of mutual respect, love and peace for all.

== Cast ==
- Sajal Aly as Zara
- Bilal Abbas Khan as Saad
- Javed Sheikh as Sikandar Salman
- Marina Khan as Mrs. Haque
- Nazr Ul Hasan as Babu
- Manzar Sehbai as Karamullah
- Samina Ahmed as Zaib
- Sheheryar Munawar as Wajih
- Naveed Raza as Vikram
- Irfan Motiwala as Masdodi (administrator)
- Hani Taha as Maria Yazdani
- Zehra Nawab as Rukhsar
- Farhan Ally Agha as Waji
- Laila Wasti as Zara's mother
- Reham Rafiq as Noorie
- Mojiz Hasan as Pervaiz
- Hina Rizvi as Hostel's warden
- Hammad Sheikh as Umang Brohi
- Hira Umer as Brohi's sister
- Hussain Mohsin as Peter
- Ali Rehman as Ali
- Qudsia Ali as Aisha
- Aneesha Altaf as Sara
- Hassan Bin Javed as Saif
- Fayed Ali as Zafar
- Faham Usman as Happy (Team India)

Additionally, Ali Zafar makes a cameo appearance in the film.

== Soundtrack ==
No.	Title	Lyrics	Music	Singer(s)	Length
1.	"Nayi Soch"	Khawaja Danish	Shuja Haider	Shuja Haider, Jabar Abbas, Nida Hussain, Fabiha Hashmi, Maria, Panah, Shehryar, Safeer	2:05
2.	"Zid Pe Ara"	Khawaja Danish	Shani Arshad	Shani Arshad	2:05
3.	"Hum Laye Hain Toofan Se"	Fayyaz Hashmi	Asrar Shah	Asrar	2:38
Total length:					6:48

== Release ==
The teaser of the film was released on 30 October 2021. The teaser received mixed responses, particularly due to the resemblance of the storyline to Bollywood's 2006 coming-of-age drama Rang De Basanti. The official trailer was released on 8 November 2021. The film was theatrically released nationwide on 19 November 2021 and was the first film to be released in the country after the COVID-19 lockdown.

== Production ==
=== Development ===
On 26 February 2021, Sajal Aly and Bilal Abbas Khan shared on their social media handles that they were leading actors in the film. Besides Aly and Khan, Sheheryar Munawar joined the cast for an extended cameo appearance. The cast also includes veterans such as Samina Ahmed, Manzar Sehbai (who played the older version of Munawar), Marina Khan, Javed Sheikh and Farhan Ally Agha. Qureshi revealed about the genre of the film that it will be a historical/ drama, much different to his previous films. On 11 July 2021, Qureshi shared on his social media handle that the shooting of the film has been completed and it took 50 days to complete.

=== Promotion ===
For the sake of promotion of the film, Aly and Khan made appearances in various TV shows including Jeeto Pakistan and Waseem Badami's Har Lamha Purjosh.

== Reception ==
=== Box office ===
The film collected a total of PKR 25 million worldwide in its first week of release and a total of PKR 60 million in its entire theatrical run. It was the first film to push open the local cinema market after COVID-19 lockdown.

=== Critical reception ===
Mohammad Kamran Jawaid of Dawn praised the film for its well-executed and emotional portrayal of the 1971 war and its consequences, with notable performances from Sajal Aly and Bilal Abbas Khan, cinematography, and the performances of the supporting cast but criticized the film's rushed narrative and editing, particularly in the pre-intermission segment, and lack of conviction and satisfaction in the conclusion. Maheen Sabeeh of The News International praised the cast performances, particularly Aly, Sheheryar Munawar, and Manzar Sehbai, but critiqued the film's execution, logic, character development, and the film's narrative, calling it a "jingoistic mess" that distorts history and promotes hate, and further found it as "confusing, historically inaccurate" that "sells the idea of breeding hate." Madiha Arsalan of The Friday Times found it as a "well scripted and executed film" with notable performances from Sajal Aly and Bilal Abbas, and lauded the set design, costumes, makeup, choreography, cinematography, dialogues, and songs but critiqued its unclear and confused narrative.

== Accolades ==
Ceremony	Categories	Recipients	Winners
21st Lux Style Awards	Best Film	Khel Khel Mein	Won
21st Lux Style Awards	Best Film Actor	Bilal Abbas Khan	Won
21st Lux Style Awards	Best Film Actress	Sajal Aly	Won
21st Lux Style Awards	Best Film Song	Nayi Soch	Won
