= Parwarish =

2025 Pakistani TV series

- Genre: Drama, Family
- Written by: Kiran Siddiqui
- Directed by: Meesam Naqvi
- Country of origin: Pakistan
- Original language: Urdu
- No. of seasons: 1
- No. of episodes: 36

Production
- Executive producer: Dr. Ali Kazmi
- Producers: Fahad Mustafa; Jerjees Seja
- Production locations: Karachi, Pakistan
- Camera setup: Multi-camera setup
- Running time: 37–40 minutes
- Production company: Big Bang Entertainment

Original release
- Network: ARY Digital
- Release: 7 April – 11 August 2025

Parwarish (Urdu:پرورش) is a Pakistani television family drama series that premiered on 7 April 2025 on ARY Digital. The show is produced by Fahad Mustafa and Jerjees Seja under the banner of Big Bang Entertainment, with direction by Meesam Naqvi and screenplay written by Kiran Siddiqui. Parwarish explores the emotional, social, and generational conflicts faced by youth within a traditional Pakistani family structure. The story centers on two teenagers, Wali and Maya, who are brought up in contrasting environments but share the burden of high expectations, personal dreams, and familial constraints. The narrative focuses on how parenting styles and upbringing shape children's personalities and decisions, with emphasis on emotional neglect, identity, ambition, and rebellion.

It stars Samar Abbas Jafri and Aina Asif, marking their second on-screen collaboration after Mayi Ri.

== Plot ==
Wali Jahangir, a 17-year-old boy, returns to Pakistan from the United States with his parents. Having been raised in a relatively liberal environment abroad, he struggles to adjust to the strict, emotionally distant atmosphere imposed by his conservative father, Jahangir. Wali harbors a passion for music but finds it difficult to express himself in a household where creativity is discouraged in favor of discipline and tradition.

On the other hand, Maya, a bright and ambitious girl from a middle-class family, dreams of becoming a doctor. Though her parents are supportive, they face financial and societal pressures that impact Maya's path.

== Cast ==
=== Main cast ===
- Samar Abbas Jafri as Wali Jahangir – A talented and sensitive teenager trying to pursue music under the shadow of his strict father.
- Aina Asif as Maya – An ambitious student aiming for medical school while navigating the hurdles of middle-class life and gender norms.

=== Supporting cast ===
- Nauman Ijaz as Jahangir – Wali's authoritarian father who believes in discipline and suppressing emotions.
- Savera Nadeem as Mahnoor – Wali's mother who tries to mediate between her husband and son.
- Shamim Hilaly as Dadi – The grandmother and silent observer of family tensions.
- Arshad Mehmood as Dada – Wali's grandfather who occasionally offers wisdom from experience.
- Reham Rafiq as Amal – Maya's best friend and emotional support.
- Nazar ul Hasan as Shaheer – Wali's uncle with more modern views.
- Bakhtawar Mazhar as Sadia – Maya's mother, warm but overburdened.
- Nooray Zeeshan as Aania – Wali's cousin and a bridge between traditional and modern values.
- Haleema Ali as Mashal – A college student with rebellious traits.
- Saman Ansari – Maya's teacher and mentor.
- Abul Hasan as Sameer – Wali's senior and informal music coach.
- Meesam Naqvi as Boss – Wali's mentor and music coach.
- Hassam Khan as Waleed – Maya's fiancé
- Ahmed Majeed as Maaz
- Fahad Mustafa

== Production ==
Parwarish was developed by Big Bang Entertainment. The show was conceptualized as a youth-centered family story that addresses emotional neglect and cultural rigidity. The cast includes a mix of seasoned actors and rising stars, particularly Samar Jafri and Aina Asif, who had gained acclaim for portraying teenage issues in Mayi Ri.

Filming took place primarily in Karachi.

== Soundtrack ==
The OST of Parwarish includes original, with the lead actor, Samar Jafri, also contributes to the soundtrack as a vocalist.

== Broadcast ==
Parwarish aired on ARY Digital every Monday and Tuesday from April to August 2025. It is also available for streaming on ARY Digital's official website and YouTube channel for international viewers.

== Controversy ==
In mid-2025, Parwarish sparked public outrage after an episode briefly featured a poster displaying LGBTQ+ symbolism in the background of a college campus scene. The image, though shown only momentarily, triggered backlash on social media, with critics accusing the show of promoting "foreign agenda" and undermining traditional cultural values. Hashtags calling for a boycott of the drama trended on local platforms, and some conservative commentators demanded regulatory action against the producers and network. In contrast, progressive viewers and civil society members defended the scene as a reflection of diverse realities on university campuses and applauded the show for subtly acknowledging marginalized identities. ARY Digital did not issue an official statement, while the production team remained silent amid the controversy. The incident reignited national debates on censorship, freedom of expression, and the visibility of LGBTQ+ individuals in Pakistani media.

== See also ==
- List of programs broadcast by ARY Digital
