= Saleem Mairaj =

Pakistani actor

- سلیم معراج
- Occupation: Actor
- Years active: 1990s–present

Saleem Mairaj is a Pakistani actor who works in theatre, television and film. He began his career in Karachi's theatre scene in the 1990s before moving into television, making an early appearance in Afsoon Khwaab, an episode of the anthology series Aik Mohabbat Sau Afsanay. He later appeared in television productions including Mann Mayal, Alif and 22 Qadam.

Mairaj's film work includes Saawan, Laal Kabootar, Ghabrana Nahi Hai, Dum Mastam, John and Na Baligh Afraad. He won Best Actor Male at the Pakistan Film Festival Australia for the short film Andha and has received nominations at the International Pakistan Prestige Awards.

== Career ==
Mairaj began his acting career in Karachi's theatre scene in the 1990s. His entry into theatre followed a performance at an Independence Day event in Lyari, Karachi, where director Shahid Shafaat of Katha Theatre and actress Sania Saeed saw him perform. Shafaat later invited him to work in theatre. Mairaj later worked with Mansoor Saeed, Sheema Kermani's Tehrik-e-Niswan and Khalid Ahmed. His theatre work included performances across Sindh and at the National School of Drama in New Delhi.

His television career began in 1999, when director Mehreen Jabbar cast him in Afsoon Khwaab, an episode of the anthology series Aik Mohabbat Sau Afsanay. He later appeared in television productions including Mann Mayal and Alif.

In 2017, Mairaj had a lead role in Saawan, which was selected by the Pakistani Academy Selection Committee as Pakistan's submission for the Best Foreign Language Film category at the 90th Academy Awards. The film starred Mairaj alongside Syed Karam Hussain, Arif Bahalim, Najiba Faiz and Imran Aslam.

In 2019, Mairaj appeared in several films, including Laal Kabootar, Talash, Kataksha and Heer Maan Ja. In Laal Kabootar, he played Asad Mama, a target killer in Karachi. He later appeared in Ghabrana Nahi Hai.

In 2023, Mairaj played Daud in the film John.

== Selected filmography ==
=== Film ===
Year	Title	Role	Notes
2007	Hell's Ground	Balay	
2008	Ramchand Pakistani	Vishesh	
2013	Main Hoon Shahid Afridi		
2013	Josh	Master Khalid	
2014	Na Maloom Afraad	Abdul Qadeer	
2016	Actor in Law	Mehboob Bhai	
2016	Saawan	Child abductor	Pakistan's submission for the 90th Academy Awards
2017	Rangreza	Waseem's friend	
2017	Na Maloom Afraad 2	Iqbal	
2017	Raasta		
2018	Pari	Abdullah	
2019	Talash	Sardar Yousuf	
2019	Heer Maan Ja		
2019	Kataksha		
2019	Laal Kabootar	Asad Mama	
2022	Quaid-e-Azam Zindabad	Corrupt sub-inspector	Cameo appearance
2022	Chaudhry	Tufail	
2022	Ghabrana Nahi Hai		Supporting role
2022	Dum Mastam	Arif Tootiwala	
2023	Chikkar	Arman Saleem Sawan	
2023	John	Daud	
2023	Daldal		
2023	Dhai Chaal		
2024	Na Baligh Afraad	Shoukat	

=== Television ===
Year	Title	Role	Notes
1999	Aik Mohabbat Sau Afsanay		Segment: "Afsoon Khwaab"
2011	Kash Mein Beta Hoti	Daud Ali Shah	
2015	Gul-e-Rana	Zaffri	
2015	Lucknow Wale Lateefullah	Police sergeant	
2016	Mann Mayal	Jamil	
2018	Khana Khud Garam Karlo		
2018	Laal		
2019	Alif	Sultan Shah	
2021	Adiala	Saleem Bhai	
2021	Khaab Toot Jaatay Hain		
2023	22 Qadam	Coach Qasim	
2023	Khushbo Mein Basay Khat		
2024	Neeli Kothi		

== Awards and nominations ==
Year	Award	Category	Work	Result	Ref(s)
2017	International Pakistan Prestige Awards	Best Supporting Actor	Mann Mayal	Nominated	
2021	Pakistan Film Festival Australia	Best Actor Male	Andha	Won	
2023	International Pakistan Prestige Awards	Best Supporting Role Male/Female Film	Dum Mastam	Nominated	
2023	International Pakistan Prestige Awards	Best Supporting Role Male/Female Film	Ghabrana Nahi Hai	Nominated	
