= Banana News Network =

- The opening title screen for BNN
- Genre: Comedy, satire
- Written by: Faisal Chaudary
- Directed by: Nabeel Qureshi
- Creative director: Mustafa Chaudary
- Starring: Murtaza Chaudhry; Mustafa Chaudhry; Mubeen Gabol; Mohsin Abbas Haider; Shafaat Ali; Waheed Khan; Asad Khalil; Yasir Ali
- Original languages: Urdu; Punjabi
- No. of seasons: 2
- No. of episodes: 249

Production
- Producer: Faisal Chaudary
- Production locations: Karachi, Pakistan

Original release
- Network: GEO TV
- Release: 10 April 2011 – 29 July 2015

Banana News Network or BNN is a Pakistani TV show that was broadcast on GEO TV on Tuesdays at 11:05pm. It originally starred Murtaza Chaudhry and his team who were formerly part of 4 Man Show on Aaj TV.

== Concept ==
BNN puts a comical spin on the happenings in Pakistan. It is a fictitious channel in which celebrities are mocked. The show has segments such as Sports Desk, News Room and Central Studio discussion. Celebrities mocked most often include Mirza Iqbal Baig, Ansar Abbasi and politicians. The main difference between BNN and other comedy Pakistani shows is that only four cast members are employed and they dress up as different celebrities on each show.

== Cast ==
- Murtaza Chaudhry as Khalid Butt (Host)
- Mustafa Chaudhry as Various celebrities' mimic
- Mubeen Gabol as Matkoo and various celebrities' mimic
- Mohsin Abbas Haider as Bhagat Singh
- Shafaat Ali as Various celebrities' mimic
- Waheed Khan as Lala and various celebrities' mimic
- Asad Khalil
- Yasir Ali

== Parting ==
The show was restarted in autumn 2013 without Murtaza Chaudhry, Mustafa Chaudhry and Mohsin Abbas Haider. Haider left the show to join Mazaaq Raat on Dunya TV.
