= Na Maloom Afraad 2 =

2017 Pakistani film by Nabeel Qureshi

- Theatrical release poster
- Urdu: نا معلوم افراد 2
- Directed by: Nabeel Qureshi
- Written by: Nabeel Qureshi; Fizza Ali Meerza
- Produced by: Fizza Ali Meerza; Mehdi Ali
- Starring: Fahad Mustafa; Jawed Sheikh; Mohsin Abbas Haider; Nayyar Ejaz; Hania Aamir; Urwa Hocane
- Narrated by: Fahad Mustafa
- Cinematography: Rana Kamran
- Edited by: Asif Mumtaz
- Music by: Shani Arshad
- Production companies: Filmwala Pictures; Excellency Films
- Distributed by: Urdu1 Pictures (Pakistan) Fox Star Studios (overseas)
- Release date: 2 September 2017
- Running time: 125 minutes
- Country: Pakistan
- Language: Urdu
- Budget: Rs. 150 million (US$540,000)
- Box office: Rs. 210 million (US$750,000)

Na Maloom Afraad 2 is a 2017 Pakistani action comedy film, co-written and directed by Nabeel Qureshi and produced by Fizza Ali Meerza and Mehdi Ali. It is a sequel to Na Maloom Afraad (2014). The film stars Fahad Mustafa, Javed Sheikh, Mohsin Abbas Haider and Urwa Hocane reprising their roles from the previous film. New additions to the cast include Marina Khan and Hania Aamir. While Nayyar Ejaz, Saleem Meraj and Nazr-ul-Hassan played the main antagonists.

Principal photography began in March 2017 in Karachi, and completed in May, while most shots are filmed in Cape Town. Shani Arshad composed the film score and soundtrack. The film released on Eid al-Adha, 2 September 2017, under the banners of Filmwala Pictures and Excellency Films, and was distributed by Urdu 1.

== Plot ==
Na Maloom Afraad 2 takes place a few years after its prequel, Farhan (Fahad Mustafa), and Shakeel bhai (Jawed Sheikh) become more destitute than they were before as they lose their multinational business. The two, along with Naina (Urwa Hocane), who is now married to Farhan, are living at a construction site and just scraping by. It's when their pal Moon (Mohsin Abbas Haider) calls to announce his wedding and brings them to South Africa that the three are united. The story kicks off when an Arab Sheikh (Nayyar Ejaz) also arrives in Cape Town with his gold commode. The Sheikh stays at a grand hotel where Moon's fiancé Parri (Hania Aamir) works. A criminal duo Iqbal and Thaakrey (Saleem Mairaj and Nazr ul Hassan) decide to steal the gold pot and blackmail the Sheikh but when the toilet is mixed up with Parri's wedding paraphernalia, the commode ends up in Moon's house, where the trio was staying. They plan to drop it in a street and inform the police to take it, but then Farhan and Shakeel take it and install it in their house. However, while bringing it to their house, a local criminal gang of Cape Town sees them and decides to work under Iqbal and Thaakrey. While using the toilet, Shakeel discovers that there are also gems in the toilet, which they collect and hide in a jewellery set. Meanwhile, the local gang enters Moon's house and steal the toilet, but are killed by the police, and the pot comes in custody of police, which they later return to the Sheikh. Iqbal and Thaakrey invade the house as they thought that the trio would return, hoping to take the gems from them. However, knowing the criminals would come to their house, the trio stayed at Parri's parents' house. The jewellery set which contained the gems was given to Parri's mother by Moon, thinking they would be kept in a safe whose code was only known to Parri's mother. Meanwhile, Parri and Naina arrive at Moon's house to get Parri's wedding dress, however, they get kidnapped by the criminal duo. The trio gets access to the Sheikh's phone and keeps it in a car which gets traced by the police. In an attempt to save the girls, Farhan, Shakeel and Moon steal the safe and bring it to the criminal duo. However, since the car was outside their base and the Sheikh's phone was in the car, the Sheikh traces it and arrives at their base. A massive shootout breaks out between police and gangs, in which the safe gets thrown off a cliff into the ocean and the girls are rescued by the trio. After a few days, Iqbal and Thaakrey are hospitalized and Sheikh gets imprisoned after his reality is revealed to the police. Shakeel becomes deaf during the shooting and Moon is married to Parri. During the wedding, Parri's mother tells the couple that she forgot to put the jewellery set in the safe and it was with her the whole time. This jewellery safe contained the same gems that Sheikh was looking for. She hands them the set and the trio is overjoyed.

== Cast ==
- Fahad Mustafa as Farhan Ahmed
- Jawed Sheikh as Shakeel Ansari
- Mohsin Abbas Haider as Moon
- Hania Aamir as Parri
- Nayyar Ejaz as Sheikh Sultan al-Baklawa
- Urwa Hocane as Naina Ahmed
- Marina Khan as Sona; Parri's mother
- Sohail Javed as Parri's father
- Saleem Mairaj as Iqbal
- Nazr-ul-Hassan as Thaakrey
- Amber Wajid as Shama (Photo only)
- Ashiq Ahmed
- Annas Kashif as himself
- Micharn Pollock as Sheikh's Assistant
- Benedikt Sebastian as Police officer

=== Special appearance ===
- Sadaf Kanwal (item song "Kaif o Suroor")

== Production ==
=== Development ===
"We'd hopefully like to start working on a NMA sequel, but don't have a timeline in mind at present," producer Fizza Ali Meerza said after nine months of success of NMA in an interview with The Express Tribune, "We don't know if it's going to be a proper sequel or a spiritual successor through which we'll tell a different story this time". At the trailer launch of the film on 21 June 2017, producer said, "NMA2 is different from NMA because it's another film altogether. It's a new film that features the same characters." "Despite its connection to the previous one, NMA2 acts as a standalone film too", she added. It is director-producer-duo's third film after Na Maloom Afraad (2014) and Actor in Law (2016).

=== Casting ===
Before he flew Dubai to host PSL 2017's opening ceremony in February, Fahad Mustafa revealed to The News, "I'm working on NMA's sequel, which will be shot in South Africa". Soon, Jawed Sheikh, Mohsin Abbas Haider, Nayyar Ejaz, Saleem Meraj and Nazr-ul-Hassan joined in too. Urwa Hocane revealed in March that she has signed NMA2 as her one of the four films in the year; thus making the cast similar as was in NMA.

Hania Amir's name was revealed in April, "Ever since I saw Actor in Law I became a huge Nabeel Qureshi fan [… that] I'd love to work with this director and then a week after that I was being asked to come for NMA2." she revealed about her role in interviews with Brandsynario, The Express Tribune and Dawn Images, "[… When] I got to know that they were trying to get in touch with me so, I instantly replied and said yes to the project."

After completing the filming, the director revealed to Dawn Images that Marina Khan is also making her film debut, "she has already shot her scenes in the film, the mother of Hania Amir's character." Khan commented, "Parwaaz Hai Junoon was supposed to be my first film, since I signed it first, but NMA2 is releasing earlier so I guess this is my debut".

Sheikh shared with The News, "I absolutely love traveling", as he had to work in many films that required travelling including this film. Also, Haider told Dawn Images that he transformed his body in a six-pack look within just one-and-a-half-month for the film.

=== Filming ===
Filming began in March 2017 in Karachi. "We've shot nearly the whole film in Cape Town, South Africa, so it will be visually very interesting." said the director Nabeel Qureshi at trailer launch, "Everything you see on screen has been done by a Pakistani." He further said, "We purchased a new Alexa camera for the film; this is the first Pakistani film to have been shot on it. We just got our sound engineering done from India, but everything else has been done by us". Filming wrapped up in May 2017. "We spent close to [Rs. 15 crore]", the director revealed at a blogger's meeting, "film's budget is also a lot bigger than the market but we are trying to make big films, to keep increasing the benchmark."

== Release ==
The film had a premiere event on 26 August in The O2 Arena, UK; where it released on 31 August. It then also premiered in Karachi Nuplex Cinema on 31 August. The film released on the festival of Eid al-Adha, 2 September 2017.

=== Box office ===
The film crossed Rs. 10 crore gross mark within a week of its release, and collected about Rs. 16 crore in ten days of its run. In its fifth weekend, the film collected Rs. 20 crore. As of December 2017 The film collected has Rs 210 crores locally.

=== Critical response ===
Rahul Aijaz of The Express Tribune rated the film 3 out of 5 stars as he felt he had seen the "film a hundred times already", commenting "no matter how funny it is, that edge is lost".

Omair Alavi of Samaa TV said that the similar "may have happened before on screen but not in Pakistan". According to him, its "full-of-pun script" is the best part, while the negative part is that the plot "revolves around the commode". He felt that role of Urwa Hocane, Hania Amir and Marina Khan didn't manage to impress.

Sonia Ashraf of Dawn Images praised the cinematography, but thought that the "script was the film's weakest link". She said, "The film could have easily been made in Pakistan… Despite it needing to be shorter, it was enjoyable."

Khurram Zaidi of Dunya News commented, "a combination of solid comedy, fine action sequences and firm enough story to take it forward".

=== Accolades ===
| Ceremony | Won | Nominated |
|---|---|---|
| 17th Lux Style Awards | Jawed Sheikh – Best Supporting Actor | Fizza Ali Meerza – Best Film; Fahad Mustafa – Best Actor; Mohsin Abbas Haider – Best Actor; Nabeel Qureshi – Best Director; Mohsin Abbas Haider – Best Male Singer for "Heerey"; Aima Baig – Best Female Singer for "Kaif o Suroor" |

=== Broadcast rights ===
The broadcast rights of the film were sold to Urdu1 & Star Gold Middle East .

=== Online streaming ===
The streaming rights of the movie were sold to Amazon Prime Video.

== Controversy ==
The film was also scheduled to release in UAE on 31 August, but it was banned by UAE film censor board. Producer Fizza Ali Meerza said to Dawn Images that this ban "will not affect [their] ways of saying things". She added, "We believe in commenting on social issues in our films".

After a month of run, Punjab Film Censor Board also issued a notification against the film, that calls for its suspension in Punjab theatres, citing "persistent complaints from different quarters" as its reason. Director Nabeel Qureshi commented on this matter to Dawn Images, saying the film "already received clearance by the censor board and" released with no issues, "then ban it a month later sets a really bad precedent." "Also, the censor board issued the notification on a weekend so I couldn't even go to court to challenge immediately," he added, saying he will take the matter to the court anyway. However, the film was reviewed again and ban was lifted shortly on 7 October with no issues. Producer said in a press, "we have suffered losses because of this sudden ban." She added, "If they are going to ban films without solid justification, it's going to affect everyone involved in Pakistani cinema."

== Soundtrack ==
Na Maloom Afraad 2

Soundtrack album by Shani Arshad
- Released: 7 August 2017
- Recorded: 2016–2017
- Genre: Filmi Soundtrack
- Length: 14:12
- Label: Sony BMG Music Entertainment
- Producers: Fizza Ali Meerza; Mehdi Ali

Shani Arshad chronology
| Actor in Law (2016) | Na Maloom Afraad 2 (2017) |

Singles from Na Maloom Afraad 2
- 1. "Heerey" Released: 16 September 2017

A promotional music video "Heerey", starring Mohsin Abbas Haider, was released on 16 September. It was directed by Kamran Lodhi, while videography was done by Faraz Ahmed Sheikh. The soundtrack album was released by Filmwala Pictures on 7 August 2017 via online musical platform Taazi.

All music is composed by Shani Arshad.

Track listing
| No. | Title | Lyrics | Singer(s) | Length |
|---|---|---|---|---|
| 1. | "Kaif o Suroor" | Sabir Zafar | Aima Baig | 4:14 |
| 2. | "Chal Hug Ley" | Shani Arshad, Nabeel Qureshi, Fizza Ali Meerza | Jabar Abbas, Shani Arshad | 4:09 |
| 3. | "Nach Nach" | Mohsin Abbas Haider | Shani Arshad | 3:05 |
| 4. | "Heerey" | Mohsin Abbas Haider | Mohsin Abbas Haider | 2:44 |
| Total length: | | | | 14:12 |

== See also ==
- List of Pakistani films of 2017
