= Na Maloom Afraad =

2014 Pakistani film by Nabeel Qureshi

- Theatrical release poster
- Urdu: نا معلوم افراد
- Directed by: Nabeel Qureshi
- Written by: Nabeel Qureshi; Fizza Ali Meerza
- Produced by: Fizza Ali Meerza; Mehdi Ali
- Starring: Fahad Mustafa; Javed Sheikh; Mohsin Abbas Haider; Urwa Hocane; Salman Shahid; Kubra Khan
- Cinematography: Rana Kamran
- Edited by: Asif Mumtaz
- Music by: Shani Arshad; Lyrics: Sabir Zafar; Mohsin Abbas Haider
- Production company: Filmwala Pictures
- Distributed by: Hum Films; Eveready Pictures; Sony Pictures
- Release dates: 6 October 2014 (Pakistan); 22 May 2015 (U.K.)
- Running time: 137 minutes
- Country: Pakistan
- Language: Urdu
- Budget: Rs. 90 million (US$320,000)
- Box office: Rs. 140 million (US$500,000) (Worldwide)

Na Maloom Afraad (lit. Unidentified People) is a 2014 Pakistani action comedy film co-written and directed by Nabeel Qureshi in his directorial debut. It stars Javed Sheikh, Fahad Mustafa, Mohsin Abbas Haider with supporting cast of Urwa Hocane, Kubra Khan and Salman Shahid. The story follows Shakeel (Sheikh), Farhaan (Mustafa) and Moon (Haider), three individuals struggling with poverty who chase every possible means of becoming rich, all getting into trouble as they struggle to fulfill their desires and ambitions through morally questionable ways.

Most of the Na Maloom Afrad shots were filmed in real locations of Saddar Town in Karachi, maintaining the authenticity of scenes and staying true to actual content; many elements of post-production required consideration before principal photography. The script was written years before the shooting, the cast went through meticulous rehearsals, and it became one of the few films that are developed completely in Pakistan. The film was shot in Karachi during January 2014 with a budget of Rs. 9 crore (US$320,000) jointly franchised by Hum Films, Filmwala Pictures and Eveready Pictures. It premiered the following year in November where it closed the South Asian International Film Festival 2014.

Na Maloom Afraad had a wide theatrical release in Pakistan on 6 October 2014 at Eid al-adha, followed by a release in UK on 22 May 2015 which has grossed Rs. 140 million (US$500,000) worldwide. The film garnered wide critical praise. At 3rd Hum Awards film was awarded Hum Honorary Special Recognition Award to Nabeel and Fizza. The film became the most nominated film of the Lux's 14th annual awards ceremony in the film section with a total of seven nominations in four categories, ultimately winning Best Film for Fizza, Best Director for Nabeel and Best Actor for Javed.

It became first Pakistani film since 2007 to make the milestone of longest running film for 165 days (22 weeks) breaking the record of Waar who previously held for 163 days. A sequel titled Na Maloom Afraad 2 was released on 2 September 2017 which collected Rs. 210 million at the box office and became the second highest-grossing film of 2017.

== Plot ==
Farhan (Fahad Mustafa), is a sales representative at IFU life insurance company in Karachi and is fired after he fails to materialize any deal in a year. Moon (Mohsin Abbas Haider), who hails from Punjab (Faisalabad), has a dream of going to Dubai, but ends up coming to Karachi while his family continues to believe he is living in Dubai. And Shakeel bhai (Javed Shaikh), an honest man who works as a government servant and owner of homemade pickle business 'Shama Achar' is under pressure to get his younger sister Naina (Urwa Hocane) married, but can't due to financial constraints. Farhan is a paying-guest of Shakeel and is in love with his sister.

Moon becomes the new tenant of Shakeel, after being expelled by his landlady (Shehnaz Pervaiz) for not paying rent on time. Jobless, Farhan and Moon plan to take a life insurance to open an account in a bank and then burn it in Karachi strike, posing as 'Na Maloom Afraad', so that they claim desired amount of money in the claim from insurance company. Meanwhile, a proposal comes for Naina and they ask for a car as dowry; devastated with his situation Shakeel goes to break his fixed deposit, but realizes that he had already withdrawn it in 1998 for his mother's (Zaheen Tahira) operation. Thinking of mortgaging his home, it's revealed to Shakeel that the government has given them a one-month notice for leaving their houses due to bridge construction over the area. With all these difficulties, Shakeel tries to kill himself but is saved by the police. Both Moon and Farhan reveal their plan to Shakeel, of which first he refused to part of, but due to his problems he reluctantly agrees. Farhan goes to Gogi (Salman Shahid) a local mobster, to borrow money for their plan. Gogi gives him three lacs, which Farhan agrees to return with interest of six lacs. Shakeel and Farhan, posing as husband and wife, open an account with the bank and they get robbed. Moon falls in love with the bank worker Hina (Kubra Khan).

All disguise themselves as a rich people and then get an insurance policy to own a fake claim. Moon, who has also borrowed money from Gogi earlier for going to Dubai, is running from him due to the drugs he saw in a doll which he gave him to transfer to another mobster in Dubai. After Jumma prayer, all three are jammed in a strike and try to burn the bank but they are caught on camera and merely escape from police. Looking at every plan going wrong, Shakeel borrows money from Gogi by giving his house on mortgage. Gogi reaches them and asks Moon for the drugs. Unable to get them, he gives them one week to give him a crore. All blame each other for their situation. Shakeel falls unconscious and on the way to the hospital they get stuck in the strike, however it is later revealed that it was a part of plan to escape from strikers. They provoke the strikers to burn the bank but only then they learn that bank is empty. Later an IFU insurance inspector Samuel (Nayyar Ejaz) came to give them claim of thirty lacs, and warns them that he knows about what they did.

They go to Gogi to offer him thirty lacs and ask him for time, but then get into a fight with a Dubai mobster and Gogi. Both of them get killed and all of three come home shocked. They find a phone ringing in a suitcase containing money and jewellery. It is then revealed that Hina robbed the bank before the strike for them. With the money, all gets settled; Shakeel buys a new home and standardises his pickle business, Farhan happily marries Naina and Moon fulfils his dream of going to Dubai.

== Cast ==
- Fahad Mustafa as Farhan Ahmed
- Jawed Sheikh as Shakeel Ansari
- Mohsin Abbas Haider as Moon
- Urwa Hocane as Naina
- Kubra Khan as Hina
- Salman Shahid as Gogi
- Amber Wajid as Shama
- Irfan Motiwala as Polka
- Masood Khan as Jango
- Saleem Mairaj as Abdul Qadeer
- Muhammad Abdullah as Abdullah
- Nayyar Ejaz as Samuel (Special appearance)
- Amanullah Khan as Moon's uncle (Special Appearance)
- Mehwish Hayat as call girl named as Billi (Special Appearance)
- Zaheen Tahira as Shakeel's Mother (Cameo)
- Shehnaz Pervaiz as Landlady
- Ali Rizvi as Tea Owner
- Paras Masroor as News Reporter

== Production ==
=== Development ===
In 2012, director of telefilms at a comedy-show Banana News Network Nabeel Qureshi had an idea of making a film with the producer and screenwriter Fizza Ali Meerza who was Qureshi's friend and colleague at National Academy of Performing Arts before dropping out. According to directors account the idea originates in a casual conversation with Fizza about banks, lockers and their insurance which ends up with the final name of 'Na Maloom Afraad', the director said, "within the next 24 hours, we had our story." In 2013 before Ramadan, Nabeel and Fizza co-write the film. Fizza and her brother financed the film with the initial budget of Rs. 5 million (US$18,000) under the banners of their own production company Filmwala Pictures. To maintain the budget of film producer wanted to make a film in Canon EOS 5D without taking extra technicalities in shooting. But the final budget of film was closed around Rs. 9 crore (US$320,000), becoming one of the biggest-budgeted films made in Pakistan. In early 2014, Hum TV came on board as media partner and by mid of year Eveready Pictures was in final negotiation for the Pakistan distribution rights. Award-winning cinematographer Rana Kamran (who previously work with Fizza on a film Armaan) was announced the director of the photography of the film.

=== Casting ===
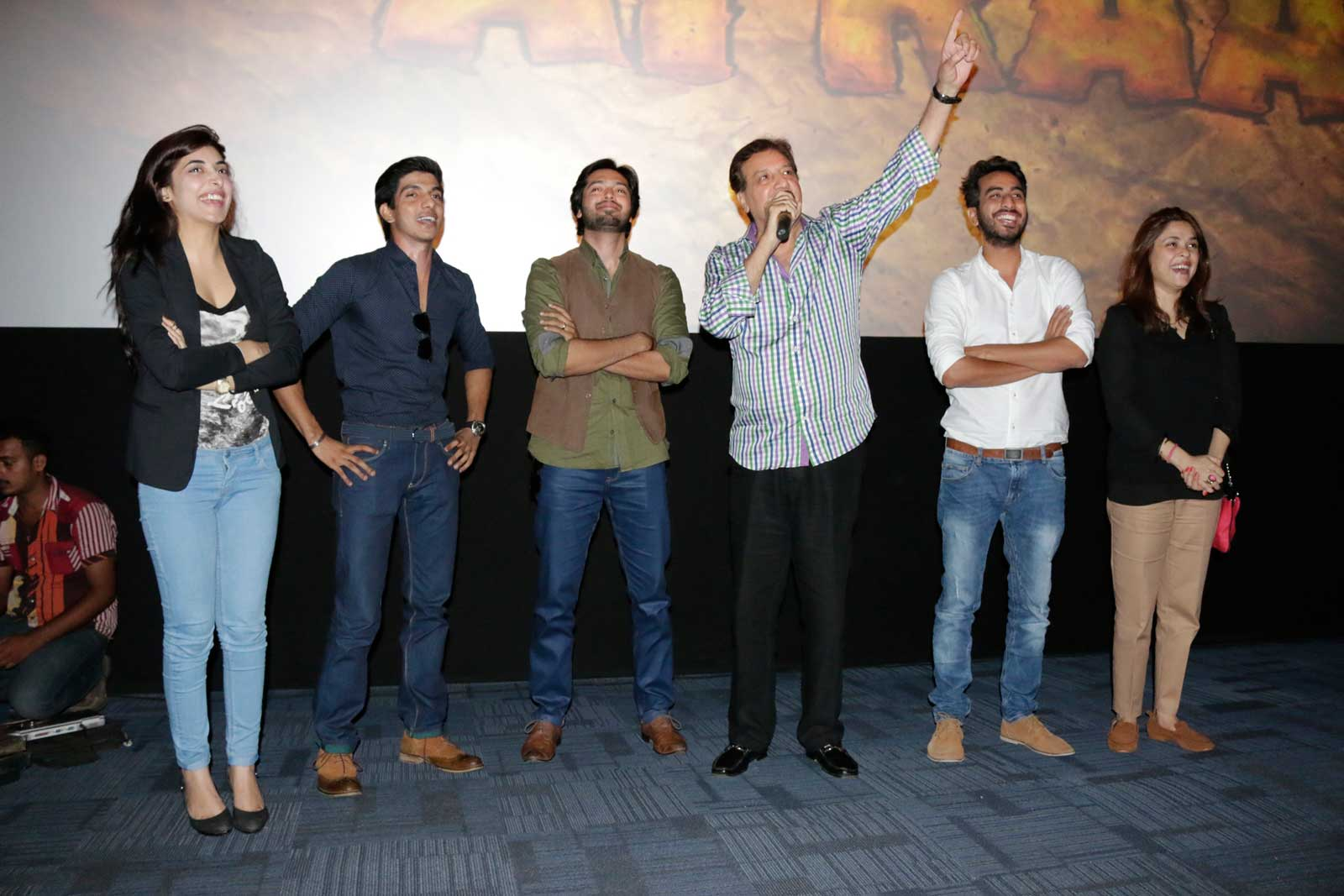
From left to right, Urwa Hocane, Mohsin Abbas Haider, Fahad Mustafa, Jawed Sheikh, Nabeel Qureshi, and Fizza Ali Meerza, promoting the film the 2014

In 2013, after the finishing work on script Nabeel and Fizza themselves chose the cast. Jawed Sheikh was the first person who was offered for the role of Shakeel Bhai, director recounts that "we had late Moeen Akhtar in our mind but after he passed away we for looked for the next best person and Jawed Sheikh came to mind". After reading the script sheikh accepted to do the film.

For the role of Farhan, television actor Fahad Mustafa came on board marking his debut in the field, director said, "It was hard to convince him to do a film because he had rejected many offers but thankfully, he liked the story and agreed." Finally for the third main lead role of Moon was given to Mohsin Abbas Haider, who was a long time friend and colleague of director from Banana News Network, Nabeel emphasize that "Mohsin and I go a long way back and I always had him in mind for the role of Moon; there was no other person approached for the role." Mohsin also mark his debut as a film actor. Television actor Saleem Mairaj was offered a role of Abd-ul-Qadir a drug addict, for which he was reluctant at first but after briefing, he accepts the role and veteran PTV actor Nayyar Ejaz confirmed to play the role of insurance company agent Samuel. Irfan Motiwala and Masood Khan confirmed to play the roles of henchmen Polka and Jango respectively. Waseem Abbas was offered the role of Gogi a local mobster and a drug dealer, but he refused to do a small role. Director then approached Salman Shahid who was also less interested for the role but after knowing that Nabeel has directed BNN's telefilms, was then willing to listen to the script, he eventually ended up agreeing to do the role.

Ambar Wajid was selected to play the role of Shama as Shakeel's wife. Kubra Khan joined the cast to play the role of Hina, a bank worker and love interest of Moon. Kubra marked her acting debut in the film, who previously worked on commercials. Television actress Urwa Hocane was selected to play the role of Naina, who in film is the sister of Shakeel and loves Farhan. Hoccane also marked her film debut from Na Maloon Afraad. Actress Meera was selected to play the role of Billi in the early stages of film, when only Sheikh was confirmed for the cast. But she refused to do the role due to her skin disease at that time, later Mehwish Hayat came on board to do the role. A special character of Stray Dog was added, who was specially trained for the film by stunt director Mehboob Shah. In addition to the cast well known television starlets Shehnaz Pervez, Zaheen Tara, Ali Rizvi and Paras Masroor also play minor roles as a landlady of Moon, mother of Shakeel, tea restaurant owner and crime show host respectively.

=== Filming ===
Principal photography began in January 2014 in Karachi. Filming took place around Saddar Town. The Saddar scenes involve an actual strike in a town; the production had to close the town for shooting; tyres and three to five cars were placed the night before the shooting to burn, in order to make scene like a strike. This was the first time in Pakistan a shooting for film took place on such a level. Filming continued till June and completed in early July. Post-production and editing were completed between July and early August. It became the first Pakistani film to be shot and released in the same year, and the second Pakistani film which was shot completely on the Arri Alexa XT digital cameras with anamorphic lenses after Jalaibee.

== Music ==
Na Maloom Afraad

Soundtrack album by Sabir Zafar, Shani Arshad & Mohsin Abbas Haider
- Language: Urdu
- Producers: Fizza Ali Meerza; Mehdi Ali

The music album was released on 5 September 2014 in a press conference held at Pearl Continental Hotel, Karachi where the film's star cast along with production team was present. Lyrics are penned by Sabir Zafar & Mohsin Abbas Haider consisting of nine tracks, with Shani & Kami composing seven and Vicky Haider & Naqash Haider with one track. Film's lead actor Mohsin Abbas Haider also wrote and sung one track Sapno Ki Mala, which was the impromptu addition to film album. The film promotion started on 13 September, with release of its first video promo of song Darbaar. The item song of film Billi is filmed on Mehwish Hayat and is sung by Saima Iqbal while it is written by Fizza Ali Meerza and Nabeel Qureshi.

=== Track listing ===
No.	Title	Lyrics	Music	Singer(s)	Length
1.	"Sapno Ki Mala"	Mohsin Abbas Haider	Shani	Mohsin Abbas Haider	2:30
2.	"Darbadar"	Sabir Zafar	Vicky Haider; Naqash Haider	Sara Raza Khan	3:54
3.	"Phurr Phurr"	Sabir Zafar	Shani & Kami	Sajjad Ali	3:14
4.	"Billi"	Nabeel Qureshi; Fizza Ali Meer	Shani & Kami	Saima Iqbal	3:21
5.	"Makri Ka Jala"		Shani	Shani
6.	"Goli Teeti Main"	Mohsin Abbas Haider	Shani	Mohsin Abbas Haider	1:20
7.	"Manga Tanga"	Sabir Zafar	Shani & Kami	Rajab Ali	2:38
8.	"Mere Neher"	Sabir Zafar	Shani	N/A	N/A
9.	"D.O.G"	N/A	N/A	N/A	N/A

== Release ==
The theatrical trailer was released on 27 June 2014 on social media and later on television. was announced at a press conference held in Karachi that the film will be distributed by Hum Films and Eveready Pictures in cinemas across Pakistan on Eid ul-Adha 2014 At box office film competed Shaan Shahid’s Operation 021 and Hrithik Roshan’s Bang Bang on their release in Eid days. On 23 November 2014 Na Maloom Afraad had its New York City premiere at South Asian International Film Festival. The film released on limited screens in U.K. on 22 May and in U.A.E. on 3 September 2015. The satellite rights if of the movie were syndicated between HUM TV and Sony Max Int. The film had its TV premiere on Hum TV as an Eid special on 19 July 2015. The film was released in DVD on 13 August 2015. The film has been made streaming available on Netflix.

=== Box office ===
Na Maloom Afraad opened on approx 78 screens, the lowest on Eid among other two releases O21 and Bang Bang on day one but picked heavily since and collected Rs. 1.77 crore (US$63,000) over first 3 Days of Eid which was slightly more than Bang bang but quite below O21. It collected Rs. 4.5 million (US$16,000) on first day of release, competing O21 at box office it crossed the figure of Rs. 51.4 million (US$180,000) on 9th day of release leaving all competitors behind and became the super hit of the time. Move held extremely well and went on to collect massive Rs. 4.05 crore (US$140,000) over Eid Week from Monday to Sunday. Movie sustained supremely over the Weekdays and added another Rs. 2.2 crore (US$79,000) over the Weekdays to take 11 days extended week one to Rs. 6.25 crore (US$220,000) which is 2nd biggest of 2014 after Kick and 4th biggest of all time after Dhoom 3, Waar and Kick on their release in Pakistan. Movie continued its stable run in second weekend and collected Rs. 2.65 crore (US$95,000) which was even more than last weekend taking grand total to Rs. 8.9 crore (US$320,000). Film showed steady performance in 3rd weekdays as well and despite facing off with Happy New Year, collected Rs. 0.69 crore (US$25,000) on the 3rd weekend. The film collected Rs 12.20 crores in Pakistan and Rs 1.80 crores in overseas for a worldwide total of Rs 140 crores.

== Reception ==
Professional ratings
Review scores
Source	Rating
The Express Tribune	4/5 stars
Dawn News	4.5/5 stars
Rotten Tomatoes	4.6/5 stars

=== Critical response ===
The film got overall positive critical reviews, The film premiered on 29 September 2014 during a press event in Atrium Cinemas, Karachi. Film's lead cast along with film director and producer attended the screening event. Several journalists were also present to cover the story. Rafay Mahmood of The Express Tribune rated the movie 4/5 and wrote "Na Maloom Afraad is a smartly-crafted film, which guarantees a paisa-vasool (money earning) experience. From the item number to the one-liners, every scene has a purpose and reveals something about the ongoing social circus in the country." Samra Muslim of Sunday wrote "Na Maloom Afraad is an out-and-out entertainer, which due to the catchy promos, strong word of mouth and excited audiences, all which will surely have the producers laughing all the way to the bank. Just what the Pakistani film industry needs!" Maliha Rehman of DAWN.com rated 4.5/5 and –wrote "It’s an all-out, tongue-in-cheek, cleverly-crafted entertainer that leaves you pining for more movies of the same variety."

=== Accolades ===
In Online winning race, It collected 2,736 votes at Tribune's Film Awards 2014, winning in most of categories both by critics and readers.

Award	Date of ceremony	Category	Recipient(s) and nominee(s)	Result	Ref(s)
Hum Awards	23 May 2015	Special Honorary Recognition Award	Nabeel Qureshi and Fizza Ali Meerza	Won	
Lux Style Awards	30 September 2015	Best Film	Mehd Ali and Fizza Ali Meerza	Won	
Lux Style Awards	30 September 2015	Best Director	Nabeel Qureshi	Won	
Lux Style Awards	30 September 2015	Best Actor	Fahad Mustafa	Nominated	
Lux Style Awards	30 September 2015	Best Actor	Javed Sheikh	Won	
Lux Style Awards	30 September 2015	Best Actor	Mohsin Abbas Haider	Nominated	
Lux Style Awards	30 September 2015	Best Actor	Salman Shahid	Nominated	
Lux Style Awards	30 September 2015	Best Actress	Kubra Khan	Won	
Lux Style Awards	30 September 2015	Best Original Soundtrack	Nabeel Qureshi and Fizza Ali Meerza	Won	
Lux Style Awards	30 September 2015	Best Song of the Year	Billi by Saima Iqbal	Nominated	

== Sequel ==
In an interview with The Express Tribune, film producer commented about sequel as, "We don't know if it's going to be a proper sequel or a spiritual successor through which we'll tell a different story this time." However, its filming took place in Cape Town, South Africa between February and May 2017.

The film released on Eid al-Adha in September 2017. Fahad Mustafa, Javed Sheikh, Mohsin Abbas Haider and Urwa Hocane returned to the sequel, joined by new members Hania Amir and Marina Khan; latter made her film debut.

== See also ==
- List of Pakistani films of 2014
- List of highest-grossing Pakistani films
