= Mayi Ri =

Pakistani television series

- Title screen
- Written by: Sana Fahad (concept and characters)
- Directed by: Meesam Naqvi
- Starring: Aina Asif; Samar Jafri; Nauman Ijaz; Maria Wasti
- Country of origin: Pakistan
- Original language: Urdu
- No. of episodes: 66

Production
- Producers: Fahad Mustafa; Dr. Ali Kazmi
- Camera setup: Multi-camera setup
- Running time: approx. 40 minutes
- Production company: Big Bang Entertainment

Original release
- Network: ARY Digital
- Release: 2 August – 7 October 2023

Mayi Ri is a 2023 Pakistani television series, created by Sana Fahad and produced by Fahad Mustafa under the Big Bang Entertainment banner. The series stars Aina Asif, who took on her first leading role, as a child bride, at just 14. It also features debutant Samar Abbas Jafri, alongside seasoned actors Nauman Ijaz, Maria Wasti, Maya Khan and Sajida Syed in supporting roles.

Premiering on ARY Digital on 23 July 2023, Mayi Ri shines a spotlight on the issue of child marriage in Pakistan.

== Plot ==
Aini is a 15-year-old high schooler being raised by her single mother Ayesha, as her father doesn't have much to do with her life. She enjoys her studies and is very ambitious. She lives with her joint family, in her uncle Zaheer's house. Zaheer decides to get his son Fakhir, who himself is a minor, married to Aini as he's dying soon. Ayesha and Samina protest against it, but they eventually have to give in and the kids get married. The show revolves around the young couple and how they struggle to navigate the decisions made by their elders. The situation worsens as Aini gets pregnant and gives birth to a daughter and is unable to manage studies along with being a mother. Meanwhile, Fakhir wishes to go abroad to study, work and probably settle there. The family opposes this but Aini asks for a divorce instead as she doesn't want to be bridled by the obligations of being his wife and a daughter-in-law anymore. She doesn't think it is fair to both of them as well as their daughter. Fakhir agrees and they get divorced. He soon departs, and with a heavy heart they say goodbye knowing it is for the good. A few years later, Aini is seen to be graduating and giving a speech about her child marriage and her mother's tough relationship with her father with Fakhir watching her on facetime. For now Aini is raising their daughter along with Ayesha and Samina with Fakhir being present in their lives too. The show ends with Fakhir face timing their daughter and Aini dropping her to school.

== Cast ==
- Samar Abbas Jafri as Fakhir Zaheer
- Nauman Ijaz as Zaheer
- Maria Wasti as Samina
- Sajida Syed as Amma
- Paras Masroor as Faraz
- Saad Faridi as Habib
- Maya Khan as Ayesha
- Aina Asif as Qurutulain aka Annie
- Rimha Ahmed as Amna
- Amna Malik as Saika
- Faham Usman as Jamshed
- Diya Mughal as fehmi
- Hiba Ali Khan as Raheela
- Bisma Babar as Aaliya

== Production ==
In March 2023, DAWN Images reported that the series, then tentatively titled Child Marriage, was about that very topic. 14-year old actress Aina Asif played her first lead role in the series. Hiba Ali Khan and Maya Khan made their comeback with the series. Director Meesam Naqvi told Arab News that besides the child bride the production would also depict a boy married at a young age and address several other topics such as educational issues.

== Reception ==
The series was praised for addressing child marriage and raising awareness regarding that issue.

A review in Dawn Images criticised the humour and light-hearted jokes that underscores the subject matter. Saman Khalid, in a review for Youlin, praised the intention and the overall production but criticised certain aspects of the plot, stating, "However, the show's thematic essence gradually dissipates as the storyline unfolds. While the vocal dissent of Annie and Fakhir regarding the marriage was conspicuous, their interpersonal dynamic left the viewers confused. Approximately ten episodes in, the youthful protagonists were united in wedlock, apparently for the purpose of scrutinizing the turbulent beginnings of their underage union. Regrettably, this exploration swiftly transitions into a contentious narrative trajectory."
