= Na Baligh Afraad =

2024 Pakistani film by Nabeel Qureshi

- Directed by: Nabeel Qureshi
- Written by: Fizza Ali Meerza
- Starring: Aashir Wajahat; Samar Jafri; Aadi Adeal Amjad; Rimha Ahmed; Faiza Hasan
- Cinematography: Rana Kamran
- Edited by: Asif Mumtaz
- Release date: 5 June 2024
- Country: Pakistan
- Language: Urdu

Na Baligh Afraad (lit. Juveniles) is a 2024 Pakistani Urdu-language coming of age comedy film released in Pakistan in June 2024. It was directed by Nabeel Qureshi and produced by Fizza Ali Meerza.

The film has debutant Samar Jafri, Aashir Wajahat and Rimha Ahmad in the lead roles.

The title of the film is inspired by Qureshi's directorial debut, Na Maloom Afraad (2014).

== Premise ==
In the 1990s in a lower middle-class Karachi neighbourhood, two teenage brothers, Mazhar and Fakhar, try to fast-track their growth to appear cooler. In their pursuit, they attempt to watch an adult film on VCR.

== Cast ==
The cast includes:

- Samar Jafri as Fakhar
- Aashir Wajahat as Mazhar
- Rimha Ahmed as Khushi
- Mohammed Ehteshamuddin as Javed
- Saleem Mairaj as Shoukat
- Faiza Hasan as Gulnaz
- Irfan Motiwala as Saleem
- Aadi Adeal Amjad as Jugnu
- Arzu Fatima as Baji
- Bilal Wajid as Tea server
- Mani as Kashif
- Fahad Mustafa as Inspector Gulab Mughal

== Production and development ==
The film was announced with the poster of the film being released on 28 May 2024 by Qureshi on his Instagram handle. The trailer of the film was released on 12 June 2024. The premiere of the film was held on 15 June 2024, at the Nueplex Cinema in Karachi. The film was released across Pakistan on Eid-ul-Azha in June 2024.

== Reception ==
In a review for Dawn Images Mohammad Kamran Jawaid praised the story of the film, performances of the actors and the depiction of the 1990s but was critical of the lack of powerful comic moments. Maheen Sabeeh, of The News International, was critical of the film and noticed its flat writing, forced humour, unnecessarily long run time and predictable characters but praised the performances of the actors, including Mani, Ehteshamuddin and Mairaj. Gaitee Ara Siddiqi, from the same newspaper, was more appreciative towards the film, and praised the story, Qureshi's direction and lead actors' performance. In a review for the Express Tribune, Shafiq Ul Hasan Siddiqui criticised the weak screenplay and poor execution but lauded certain comical moments and acting performances of Ehteshamuddin, Adeel and Mairaj but was a bit critical of the acting of the lead cast.

== See also ==
- List of Pakistani films of 2024
