= Fizza Ali Meerza =

Pakistani producer

- Born: Karachi, Sindh, Pakistan
- Occupations: Film producer; screenwriter
- Years active: 2014-present
- Notable work: Na Maloom Afraad, Actor in Law, Na Maloom Afraad 2 & Load Wedding

Fizza Ali Meerza is a Pakistani film producer, and screenwriter best known for making films that tackle socio-economic issues. She became known in Pakistani cinema with her debut film, Na Maloom Afraad (2014).

== Career ==
Ali Meerza started her career with Na Maloom Afraad which was a hit at the box office. After that, she produced Actor in Law, Na Maloom Afraad 2, and Load Wedding.

She was awarded the Tamgha-e-Imtiaz by the Government of Pakistan in 2024.

== Filmography ==
=== Films ===
Year	Film	Producer	Writer	Notes
2014	Na Maloom Afraad	Yes	Yes	
2016	Actor in Law	Yes	Yes	Cameo as 'Baby Doll'
2017	Na Maloom Afraad 2	Yes	Yes	
2018	Load Wedding	Yes	Yes	
2021	Khel Khel Mein	Yes	Yes	
2022	Quaid-e-Azam Zindabad	Yes	Yes	
2024	Na Baligh Afraad	Yes	Yes	
2026	Zombeid	Yes	Yes	

== Awards and nominations ==
Year	Award	Category	Film	Result
2015	Lux Style Awards	Best Original Soundtrack	Na Maloom Afraad	Won
2015	Lux Style Awards	Best Film	Na Maloom Afraad	Won
2016	Lux Style Awards	Best Film	Actor in Law	Won
2017	Lux Style Awards	Best Film	Na Maloom Afraad 2	Nominated
2018	Lux Style Awards	Best Film	Load Wedding	Nominated
2020	Lux Style Awards	Best Film	Khel Khel Mein	Won
