= Fahad Mustafa =

Pakistani actor, producer and host (born 1983)

- فهد مصطفيٰ
- Born: Fahad Salahuddin; 26 June 1983 (age 43); Karachi, Sindh, Pakistan
- Education: Baqai Medical University (dropout)
- Occupations: Actor; producer; television host
- Years active: 2002–present
- Height: 182 cm (6 ft 0 in)
- Spouse: Sana Fahad (m. 2005)
- Children: 2
- Father: Salahuddin Tunio

Fahad Salahuddin, (Note: Sindhi: فهد صلاح الدين, Sindhi pronunciation: [fəɦəd̪ səlɑːɦʊd̪ːiːn].) known professionally as Fahad Mustafa (Note: Sindhi: فهد مصطفيٰ, Sindhi pronunciation: [fəɦəd̪ mʊst̪əfɑː].) (Sindhi: فهد مصطفيٰ, pronounced [fəɦəd̪ mʊst̪əfɑː]; born 26 June 1983), is a Pakistani actor, producer, and television host who works in Urdu films and television. One of Pakistan's highest-paid actors. As a producer he has numerous series that have been well received. Mustafa also hosts Jeeto Pakistan, since 2014 which is known as the biggest game show in Pakistan.

Born in Karachi, Pakistan, Mustafa is the son of veteran Sindhi actor Salahuddin Tunio. He began his career in the early 2000s and made his acting debut with the television series Umrao Jaan Ada (2003). He rose to fame with popular dramas including Main Abdul Qadir Hoon (2010), Ek Tamanna Lahasil Si (2012), Daagh (2012), Kankar (2013) and Dusri Biwi (2014). After a long hiatus, he made his television comeback with the romantic drama Kabhi Main Kabhi Tum (2024), which he earned him the Lux Style Award for Best Actor Popular.

== Early life ==
Mustafa was born into a Sindhi family in Karachi, Pakistan. His father, Salahuddin Tunio, is a well-known Sindhi actor. Mustafa has two brothers and one sister.

He initially enrolled in the Doctor of Pharmacy program at Baqai Medical University in Karachi, but dropped out before completing his studies.

Mustafa has credited Indian actor Govinda for inspiring him to become an actor.

== Acting career ==
=== Television ===
Mustafa first gained recognition for his performance in Sheeshay Ka Mahal (2002). In an interview with Dawn, he recalled that although the serial did not perform well, his work was noticed, and he continued to be cast despite initial reservations about his appearance. Mustafa said that during the early 17-18 episodes he had no spoken dialogue and appeared mainly as a silent character, but the experience proved formative for his career. He later described how he gained confidence and recognition through the project, which eventually led to further opportunities in television.

His critically acclaimed role in the drama Veena (2009) earned him a nomination for Best TV Actor at the Lux Style Awards. Initially a guest appearance, he developed his part into the title role. He portrayed a transgender character, a role that required filming on location in Sindh, including scenes at a Sufi shrine. Mustafa later described the role as challenging and noted that he deliberately limited his screen appearances, believing it would make the character more acceptable to audiences. Also in 2009, he featured in Aashti, playing a Bengali character and learning the Bengali language, calling it one of his favorite roles.

His other notable television serials include Main Abdul Qadir Hoon (2010), Ek Tamanna Lahasil Si (2012), Daagh (2012), Kankar (2013) and Dusri Biwi (2014).

Mustafa made his comeback to acting in the television industry in 2024 with Kabhi Main Kabhi Tum opposite Hania Amir, marking his comeback to television serials after nine years.

=== Cinema ===
He made his film debut in 2014 in director Nabeel Qureshi's Na Maloom Afraad. It was declared a box office hit. In 2016, he starred in Anjum Shahzad's Mah e Mir and Qureshi's Actor in Law. Actor in Law did very well at the box office and received critical acclaim, winning Film of the Year Award in the 16th Lux Style Awards, where Mustafa also won the Best Actor Award for his role in the film. He then had a voice role in Sharmeen Obaid-Chinoy's animated film 3 Bahadur: The Revenge of Baba Balaam. In 2018, he starred in Nadeem Baig's Jawani Phir Nahi Ani 2 and Qureshi's Load Wedding; both of which released on same day, 22 August 2018. Mustafa will next star in Nabeel Qureshi's upcoming zombie thriller Zombeid, opposite Mehwish Hayat and Babar Ali. The film is scheduled for release on Eid al-Adha in 2026.

== Other work ==
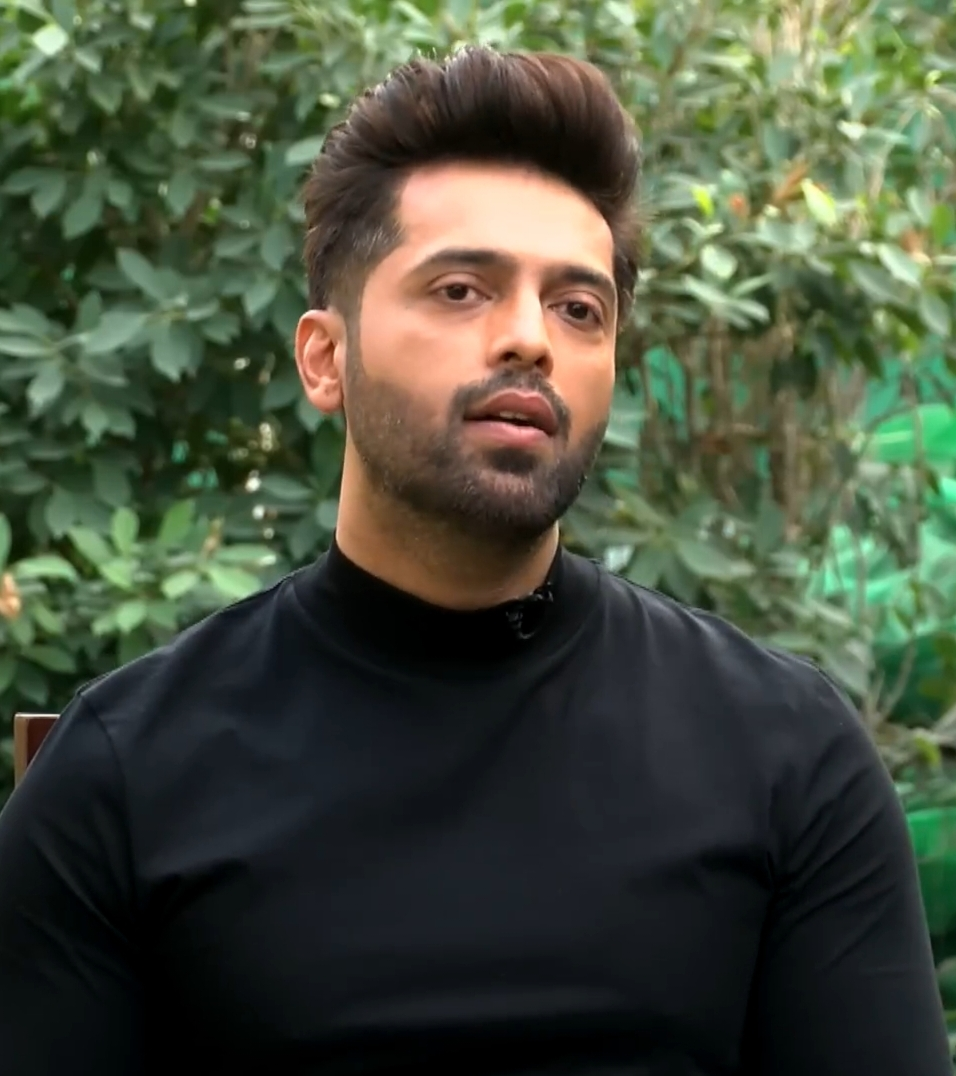
Fahad Mustafa in 2020

=== Production ===
In 2008, he ventured into television production, co-founding Big Bang Entertainment under which he has produced numerous dramas that have received critical acclaim as well awards. He produces mostly for ARY Digital.

As of 2017 he had announced that will also be producing three films; the first Anjum Shehzad's Band Toh Ab Bajay Ga, which will be written by Yasir Hussain; the second one will be written by Ali Imran under ARY Films banner; and a third one for which no details have been announced yet.

=== Hosting ===
He has been the host of the well-known game show Jeeto Pakistan since 2014.

He hosted the 1st Hum Awards in Karachi in 2013, and the 2nd ARY Film Awards in Dubai in 2016. In 2017, he hosted the launching ceremony for the Karachi Kings, a Pakistan Super League team franchise. He then also hosted the opening ceremony of the 2017 Pakistan Super League in Dubai.

== Personal life ==
In 2006, Mustafa married Pakistani writer Sana Fahad. The couple has two children, a daughter born in April 2011, and a son born in January 2016.

== Filmography ==
=== Films ===
Key
†	Denotes films that have not yet been released

Year	Film	Role	Notes	Ref.
2014	Na Maloom Afraad	Farhan Ahmed	Debut film	
2015	Jawani Phir Nahi Ani	Himself	Special appearance	
2016	Mah e Mir	Ahmad Jamal / Mir Taqi Mir		
2016	Actor in Law	Shan Mirza		
2016	3 Bahadur: The Revenge of Baba Balaam	Imran	Voice only	
2017	Na Maloom Afraad 2	Farhan Ahmed		
2018	Jawani Phir Nahi Ani 2	Rahat		
2018	Load Wedding	Raja		
2018	3 Bahadur: Rise of the Warriors	Imran	Voice only	
2022	Quaid-e-Azam Zindabad	Inspector Gulab Mughal		
2024	Na Baligh Afraad	Inspector Gulab Mughal	Guest appearance	
2026	Aag Lagay Basti Mein	Barkat		
2026	Zombeid	Wali		

=== Television ===
==== Actor ====
Year	Drama	Role	Network	Ref()s
2002	Sheeshay Ka Mahal		PTV	
2003	Umrao Jaan Ada		Geo Entertainment	
2004	Wujood-e-Laraib	Sadi	Indus TV	
2005	Shiddat		Hum TV	
2005	Lahasil	Zain Adaab	Hum TV	
2006	Makan	Gulfam	Geo Entertainment	
2008	Yeh Zindagi Hai	Bhola	Geo Entertainment	
2008	Chutkiyan		Hum TV	
2009	Tum Jo Miley	Hadi	Hum TV	
2009	Veena	Veena / Murad	ARY Digital	
2009	Woh Ishq		ARY Digital	
2009	Aashti	Saeed-ul-Islam	Hum TV	
2009	Tair-e-Lahooti	Pasha	Hum TV	
2010	Main Abdul Qadir Hoon	Abdul Qadir	Hum TV	
2010	Sandal	Tailor Asadullah	Geo Entertainment	
2011	Zindagi Dhoop Tum Ghana Saya	Mazhar	ARY Digital	
2011	Main Chand Si	Farhan	ARY Digital	
2011	Mastana Mahi	Adal Soomro	Hum TV	
2011	Ek Hatheli Pe Hina Ek Hatheli Pe Lahoo	Zain-ul-Abideen	Geo Entertainment	
2012	Ek Tamanna Lahasil Si	Mohsin	Hum TV	
	Mera Saaein 2	Malik Wajahat Hayat	ARY Digital	
2013	Daagh	Murad	ARY Digital	
2013	Mere Humrahi	Ahmed	ARY Digital	
2013	Kankar	Sikandar	Hum TV	
2014	Koi Nahi Apna	Hamza	ARY Digital	
2014	Maaye Ni	Huzaifa	ARY Digital	
2014	Pul Sirat	Asad	ARY Digital	
2015	Dusri Bivi	Hassan	ARY Digital	
2024	Kabhi Main Kabhi Tum	Mustafa Ahmed	ARY Digital	

==== Host ====
Year	Show
2009–14	Jago Pakistan Jago
2014–present	Jeeto Pakistan

==== Producer ====
(Under banner of Big Bang Entertainment)

Year	Title	Network
2013	Meri Beti	ARY Digital
2014	Koi Nahi Apna	ARY Digital
2014	Dusri Biwi	ARY Digital
2014	Bahu Begum	ARY Digital
2014	Soutan	ARY Digital
2015	Rang Laaga	ARY Digital
2015	Mere Jeevan Saathi	ARY Digital
2015	Begunaah	ARY Digital
2015	Zinda Dargor	ARY Digital
2016	Bay Aib	Urdu 1
2016	Yeh Ishq	ARY Digital
2016	Waada	ARY Digital
2016	Muqabil	ARY Digital
2016	Beqasoor	ARY Digital
2016	Andaaz-e-Sitam	Urdu 1
2016	Haya Kay Rang	ARY Zindagi
2016	Naimat	ARY Digital
2016	Tum Yaad Aaye	ARY Digital
2016	Aap Ke Liye	ARY Digital
2016	Saheliyaan	ARY Digital
2016	Mere Baba ki Ounchi Haveli	ARY Zindagi
2016	Teri Chah Mein	ARY Digital
2016	Mera Yaar Miladay	ARY Digital
2016	Socha Na Tha	ARY Zindagi
2016	Dil Haari	ARY Zindagi
2016	Shehzada Saleem	ARY Digital
2017	Bubbly Kya Chahti Hai	ARY Digital
2017	Mubarak Ho Beti Hui Hai	ARY Digital
2017	Zaakham	ARY Digital
2017	Bilqees Urf Bitto	Urdu 1
2017	Bachay Baraye Farokht	Urdu 1
2017	Teri Raza	ARY Digital
2017	Aisi Hai Tanhai	ARY Digital
2018	Meri Guriya	ARY Digital
2018	Nibah	ARY Digital
2018	Babban Khala Ki Betiyann	ARY Digital
2018	Badbakht	ARY Zindagi
2018	Balaa	ARY Digital
2018	Khudparast	ARY Digital
2018	Visaal	ARY Digital
2019	Cheekh	ARY Digital
2019	Bandish	ARY Digital
2019	Hasad	ARY Digital
2019	Bewafa	ARY Digital
2020	Ishqiya	ARY Digital
2020	Jalan	ARY Digital
2020	Nand	ARY Digital
2020	Aulaad	ARY Digital
2020	Dunk	ARY Digital
2021	Ishq Hai	ARY Digital
2021	Lockdown	Express Entertainment
2021	Hum Tum	Express Entertainment
2022	Dil-e-Veeran	ARY Digital
2022	Taqdeer	ARY Digital
2022	Mujhe Pyaar Hua Tha	ARY Digital
2022	Pyar Deewangi Hai (TV series)	ARY Digital
2023	Maray Hi Rahna	ARY Digital
2023	Mayi Ri	ARY Digital
2023	Mein	ARY Digital
2023	Bandish 2	ARY Digital
2024	Hasarat	ARY Digital
2024	Tera Waada	ARY Digital
2024	Burns Road Kay Romeo Juliet	ARY Digital
2024	Kabhi Main Kabhi Tum	ARY Digital
2024-2025	Bharam	ARY Digital
2025	Parwarish	ARY Digital
2025	Biryani	ARY Digital
2025	Chalbaaz	ARY Digital
2025-2026	Kafeel	ARY Digital

== Awards and nominations ==
=== Acting and hosting awards ===
Year	Nominee / work	Award	Result	Ref
Lux Style Awards
2009	Kaisey Aye Karar	Best TV Actor (Terrestrial)	Nominated	
2010	Veena	Best TV Actor (Satellite)	Nominated	
2011	Haal-e-Dil	Best TV Actor (Satellite)	Nominated	
2012	Abdul Qadir – Main Abdul Qadir Hoon	Best TV Actor (Satellite)	Nominated	
2012	Adal Soomro – Mastana Mahi	Best TV Actor (Satellite)	Nominated	
2014	Murad – Daagh	Best TV Actor (Satellite)	Nominated	
2014	Sikandar – Kankar	Best TV Actor (Satellite)	Nominated	
2015	Farhan – Na Maloom Afraad	Best Film Actor	Nominated	
2017	Jamal/Mir – Mah e Mir	Best Lead Actor in a Film	Nominated	
2017	Shan Mirza – Actor in Law	Best Lead Actor in a Film	Won	
2018	Farhan – Na Maloom Afraad 2	Best Lead Actor in a Film	Nominated	
2019	Raja – Load Wedding	Best Film Actor (Critics' choice)	Won	
2026	Mustafa Ahmed – Kabhi Main Kabhi Tum	Actor of the Year - Male (Viewers’ choice)	Won	
Hum Awards
2013	Jago Pakistan Jago	Hum Award for Best Host	Won	
2014	Sikandar – Kankar	Hum Award for Best Actor	Nominated	
2014	Sikandar – Kankar	Hum Award for Best Actor Popular	Nominated	
2014	Kankar (shared with Sanam Baloch)	Hum Award for Best Onscreen Couple	Nominated	
2014	Kankar (shared with Sanam Baloch)	Hum Award for Best Onscreen Couple Popular	Nominated	
Hum Style Awards
2016	Jeeto Pakistan	Most Stylish TV Host	Nominated	
International Pakistan Prestige Awards
2017	Shan Mirza – Actor in Law	Best Film Actor	Won	
Pakistan International Film Festival
2018	Shan Mirza – Actor in Law	Best Actor (Male)	Won	
Pakistan International Screen Awards
2026	Mustafa Ahmed – Kabhi Main Kabhi Tum	Best Actor - TV (Popular)	Pending	
2026	Mustafa Ahmed – Kabhi Main Kabhi Tum	Best Actor - TV (Critic’s Choice)	Pending	
2026	Kabhi Main Kabhi Tum shared with Hania Aamir	Best Onscreen Couple	Pending	

=== Production awards ===
	Ceremony	Category	Project	Result
2016	15th Lux Style Awards	Best TV Play	Rang Laaga	Nominated
2018	17th Lux Style Awards	Best TV Play	Muqabil	Nominated
2019	18th Lux Style Awards	Best TV Play	Aisi Hai Tanhai	Nominated
2020	19th Lux Style Awards	Best TV Play	Cheekh	Nominated
2022	21st Lux Style Awards	Best TV Play	Ishq Hai	Nominated
2023	22nd Lux Style Awards	Best TV Long Play	Betiyaan	Won

=== Honorary awards ===
Year	Ceremony	Category	Work	Result	Ref.
2024	UK Parliament	Diversity and Cultural Impact Award	For making an impact globally through his contributions in Pakistani entertainment and media industry	Won	
2024	UK Parliament	Global Cultural Unity Award	For making an impact globally through his contributions in Pakistani entertainment and media industry	Won	
