= Rimha Ahmed =

Pakistani actress (born 2000)

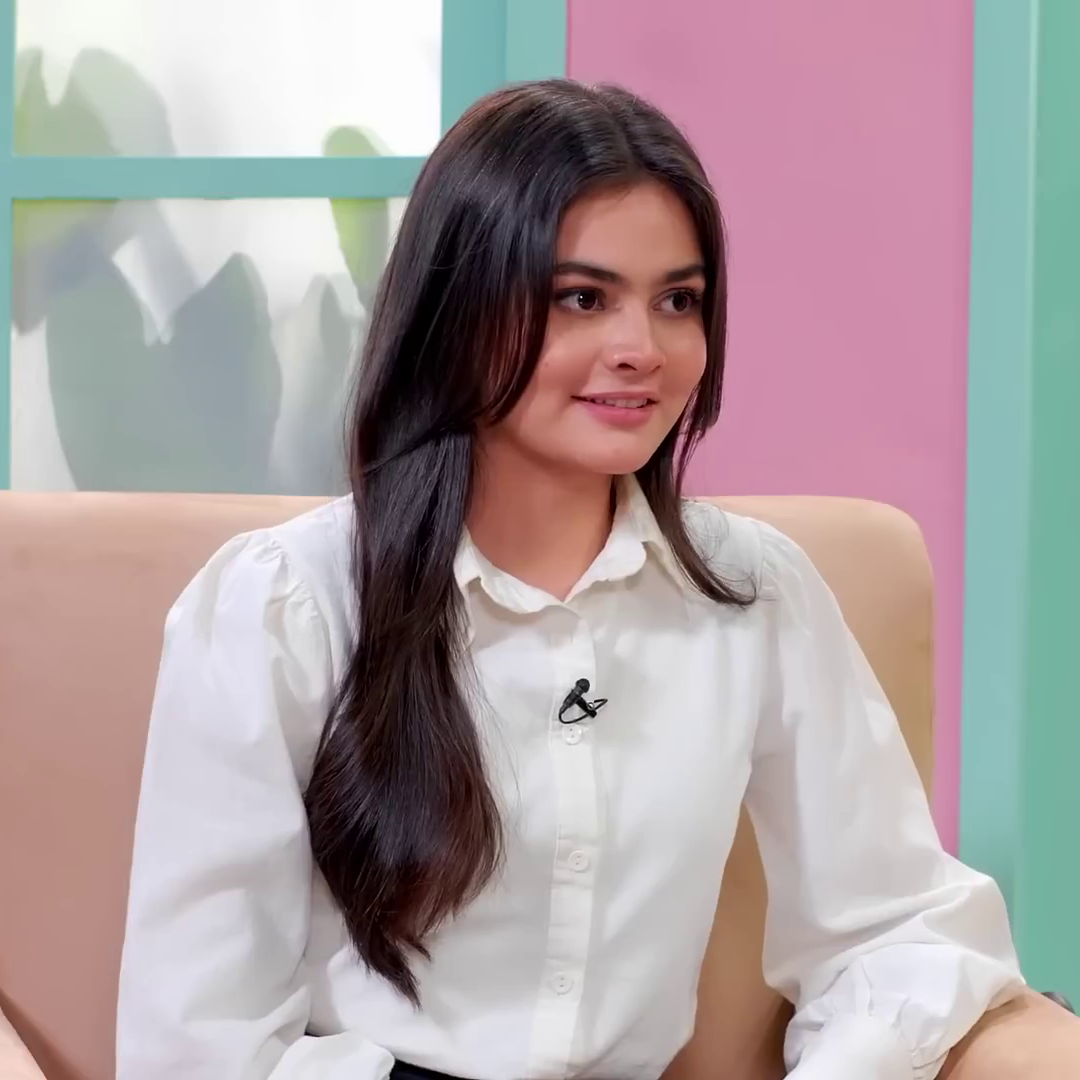
- Rimha Ahmed in 2025
- Born: 6 January 2000 (age 26); Karachi, Sindh, Pakistan
- Occupations: Actress, Model, Influencer
- Years active: 2016–present
- Relatives: Rashida Tabassum (mother)

Rimha Ahmed is a Pakistani television actress, model, and social media influencer. She is known for her work in various television serials including Khaani and Mayi Ri. She has portrayed a lead role in 2024 feature film Na Baligh Afraad.

== Early life and career ==
Rimha Ahmed was born in Karachi, Pakistan. Her mother, Rashida Tabassum, is also associated with the television industry.

She began her career in the entertainment industry at a young age, starting as a child star when she was in eighth grade. She was introduced to the media through Citrus Talent and appeared in several advertisements before transitioning to acting. She made her acting debut in the television drama Choti Si Zindagi.

== Filmography ==
=== Film ===
Year	Title	Role	Notes	Ref(s)
2024	Na Baligh Afraad	Khushi	Lead Role	

=== Telefilm ===
Year	Title	Role	Network
2025	U Turn Wala Love		ARY Digital

=== Television series ===
Year	Title	Role	Network	Ref(s)
2016	Choti Si Zindagi		Hum TV	
2017	Khaani	Sana Ali Khan	Geo Entertainment	
2017	Main Maa Nahi Banna Chahti		Hum TV	
2017	Zakham		Geo Entertainment	
2020	Uraan	Minahil	Geo Entertainment	
2021	Mohabbat Chor Di Maine	Aleena	Geo Entertainment	
2021	Makafaat		Geo Entertainment	
2022	Guddu	Nazo	Geo Entertainment	
2022	Rockstar		TV One	
2022	Muqaddar Ka Sitara	Natasha	ARY Digital	
2023	Mayi Ri	Amna	ARY Digital	
2024	Dil Ik Shehar e Junoon		Hum TV	
2024	Baby Baji Ki Bahuwain	Saman	ARY Digital	
2026	Khush Naseebi	Maheen	Geo Entertainment	
2026	Raja London Ka	Rani	Express Entertainment	
