= Romeo Weds Heer =

Pakistani drama television series

- Genre: Romantic comedy
- Created by: Mehrunnisa Mustaqeem Khan
- Developed by: 7th Sky Entertainment
- Written by: Muhammad Younis Butt
- Screenplay by: Muhammad Younis Butt
- Directed by: Anjum Shahzad
- Starring: Feroze Khan; Sana Javed
- Opening theme: Main Tera Romeo Bana Tu Meri Heer Soniye
- Country of origin: Pakistan
- Original language: Urdu
- No. of seasons: 1
- No. of episodes: 36

Production
- Producers: Abdullah Kadwani; Asad Qureshi
- Production location: Pakistan
- Camera setup: Multi-camera setup
- Running time: approx. 40 minutes
- Production company: 7th Sky Entertainment

Original release
- Network: Geo Entertainment
- Release: 21 October 2018 – 26 May 2019

Romeo Weds Heer (Urdu: رومیو ویڈز ہیر) is a 2018 Pakistani drama serial, directed by Anjum Shahzad, written by Muhammad Younis Butt and produced by 7th Sky Productions. It stars Feroze Khan and Sana Javed in lead roles. The show premiered on Geo Entertainment on 21 October 2018, originally airing in single episodes on Sunday evenings. Towards the end of its run, it began airing in a mega-episode format on Sunday evenings. The series ended on 26 May 2019.

== Plot ==
The drama is a rom-com between Feroze Khan, who plays Romeo, the son of successful and rich doctors, and Sana Javed as Heer, the daughter of a herbal-medication health practitioner (called hakim amongst the Muslim community in the Indian subcontinent) and a regular housewife; two college sweethearts who fight totally different family backgrounds and finally manage to get together against the odds.

== Cast ==
- Feroze Khan as Romeo Raja
- Sana Javed as Heer Luqman/Heer Romeo Raja
- Saman Ansari as Dr. Shahnaz Raja, Romeo’s mother
- Zia Gorchani as Dr. Shahbaz Raja, Romeo’s father
- Zohreh Ali as Manaal, Romeo’s sister
- Fareeda Shabbir as Rolly, Romeo's aunt
- Tara Mahmood as Irshad, Heer’s mother
- Firdous Jamal as Hakeem Luqman, Heer’s father
- Mariam Ansari as Soni, Heer’s sister
- Beena Chaudhary as JD's mother
- Ali Rizvi as Aflatoon, Heer’s brother
- Shafaat Ali as Nazar, Heer’s brother-in-law
- Ali Safina as Jaidi, Heer’s ex-fiancé
- Farhan Alam as Chashmatu, Heer’s friend
- Rayyan Ibrahim as Bubble, Heer’s friend
- Namrah Shahid as Shanzey, Romeo’s friend
- Waqar as Elephant, Romeo’s best friend
- Michelle Mumtaz as Faryal
- Reham Rafiq as background dancer

== Production ==
Feroze Khan shared his new look from his next play named Romeo Weds Heer on Instagram. He further informed his fans that this would be a Rom-com and would also be directed by Anjum Shahzad. It marks the third collaboration of Feroze with director Anjum Shahzad after the romantic films Zindagi Kitni Haseen Hai and Saga of Love and Revenge Khaani. Anjum, once again, selected Sana Javed as the female lead after her mind blowing performance in Khaani, thus the trio returned. Besides this, the leading couple has also been a part of Mehreen Jabbar's Dino Ki Dulhaniya, a television film, thus this marks the third appearance of Feroze and Sana as a couple.

Romeo Weds Heer is written by Muhammad Younis Butt. It is produced under the banner of 7th Sky Entertainment.

== Reception ==
The show impressed with super high ratings in its first episodes; reaching 4-1 TRPs. It kept a lead for many weeks, and if it was not number 1 it was still in top 10. However towards the end the TRP began falling down and was no longer in the top 10. The highest TRP achieved by drama was 11.07

=== Awards and nominations ===
| Year | Awards | Category | Recipient | Result |
|---|---|---|---|---|
| February 7, 2020 | PISA 2020 | Best Television Actor in Comedy Role | Firdous Jamal | Nominated |
| February 7, 2020 | PISA 2020 | Best Television Actress in Comedy Role | Saman Ansari | Nominated |

== Soundtrack ==
Romeo Weds Heer OST

Soundtrack album by Sahir Ali Bagga & Aima Baig
- Recorded: 2018
- Genre: Television soundtrack
- Length: 4:27
- Language: Urdu
- Label: Geo Entertainment

Music Videos
- "Romeo Weds Heer" OST on YouTube
- "Romeo Weds Heer" Teriyan on YouTube

The title song was sung by Sahir Ali Bagga & Aima Baig and has more than 21.70 million views on YouTube. Sahir Ali Bagga also composed the music.

=== Track listing ===
| No. | Title | Artist(s) | Length |
|---|---|---|---|
| 1. | ""Romeo Heer"" | Sahir Ali Bagga & Aima Baig | 4:27 |
| 2. | ""Teriyan"" | Asim Azhar & Aima Baig | 4:35 |
