= Hashim Nadeem =

Pakistani Urdu novelist, drama writer and fiction writer

Hashim Nadeem Qasrani PP
- Born: Shalkot (Quetta), Balochistan, Pakistan
- Education: Cadet College Petaro
- Occupation: Writer

Hashim Nadeem (Urdu: ہاشم ندیم) is an Urdu novelist, poet and screenwriter from Pakistan. Through his scripts of television serials, he established himself among the well-known writers of the industry. Beginning his screenwriting career in the late 2010s, Nadeem is also the recipient of Lux Style Award and President's Pride of Performance.

== Career ==
Nadeem's popular novels include Bachpan Ka December, Abdullah and Khuda Aur Muhabbat. He first shot to fame in 2012 with spiritual romance Khuda Aur Muhabbat (season 1), which was based on his novel of the same name, and later followed by two seasons. In 2015, Nadeem made his feature film directorial debut with Abdullah: The Final Witness, based on the Kharotabad Incident. The film was screened at the 2015 Cannes Film Festival and received rave reviews from critics for its subject, with Lubna Jerar Naqvi of The News International praising the cinematography, camera-shots and the topic of the film, stating it as a "good attempt". His later scripts include Dhaani, Visaal and Ishq Zahe Naseeb, the latter of which earned him a nomination of Best TV Writer at the 19th Lux Style Awards. He gained critical acclaim with Parizaad, the adaptation of his eponymous novel.

== Early life ==
Nadeem was born in Quetta, Balochistan. He got his early education in Cadet College Petaro, after studying at the Bolan Medical College. He passed civil service examination in 1996 and served as Assistant Commissioner in Quetta.

== List of novels ==
- Bachpan Ka December
- Khuda Aur Muhabbat
- Abdullah
- Abdullah II
- Saleeb-e-Ishq
- Aik Muhabbat aur Sahi
- Muqaddas
- Parizaad
- Raqs e bismal
- Abdullah 3

== Filmography (as a writer) ==
=== Television ===
Year	Title	Director	Network	Ref(s)
2011	Khuda Aur Muhabbat (season 1)	Anjum Shahzad	Geo Entertainment	
2016	Khuda Aur Muhabbat (season 2)	Ali Usama	Geo Entertainment	
2016	Dhaani	Ali Faizan	Geo Entertainment	
2018	Visaal	Ali Hassan	ARY Digital	
2019	Ishq Zahe Naseeb	Farooq Rind	Hum TV	
2020	Raqs-e-Bismil	Wajahat Rauf	Hum TV	
2021	Khuda Aur Muhabbat (season 3)	Syed Wajahat Hussain	Geo Entertainment	
2021	Parizaad	Shahzad Kashmiri	Hum TV	
2023	Jhoom	Ali Faizan	Geo Entertainment	
2023	Jhok Sarkar	Saife Hassan	Hum TV	
2025	Sanwal Yaar Piya	Danish Nawaz	Geo Entertainment	
TBA	Cafe Firaaq †	TBA	Hum TV	

== Awards and nominations ==
Year	Awards	Category	Recipient	Result	Ref(s)
2020	19th Lux Style Awards	Best Television Writer	Ishq Zahe Naseeb	Nominated	
2022	8th Hum Awards	Best Writer Drama Serial	Parizaad	Won	
2022	21st Lux Style Awards	Best Television Writer	Parizaad	Won	
2024	9th Hum Awards	Best Writer Drama Serial	Jhok Sarkar	Won	
