= Khuda Aur Muhabbat =

Pakistani spiritual-romantic drama series

- Urdu: خدا اور محبت
- Genre: Melodrama; Romance
- Written by: Hashim Nadeem
- Directed by: Anjum Shahzad (season 1); Ali Usama (season 2); Syed Wajahat (season 3)
- Starring: See below
- Composer: Imran Abbas
- Country of origin: Pakistan
- Original language: Urdu
- No. of seasons: 3
- No. of episodes: 76

Production
- Producers: Javeria Saud (season 1); Babar Javed (season 2); Abdullah Kadwani (season 3); Asad Qureshi (season 3)
- Production locations: Bahawalpur; Multan; Lahore

Original release
- Network: Geo Entertainment
- Release: 17 February 2011 – 5 November 2021

Khuda Aur Muhabbat (Urdu: خدا اور محبت; transl. God and Love) is a Pakistani spiritual-romantic drama series that aired on Geo Entertainment. It is based upon a novel of the same name by Hashim Nadeem. Imran Abbas Naqvi and Sadia Khan play the lead roles in the first season, which aired in 2011.

== Plot ==
=== Season 1 ===
Khuda Aur Mohabbat's season 1 has a spiritual-love story of two star-struck lovers. Hammad belongs to an elite family and has recently completed his Bachelor's in Commerce. Hammad's strange encounter with Imaan, the daughter of Moulvi Aleemuddin, brings an immense change in his life. Hammad's love at first sight with Imaan eventually leads him to leave his family and his lavish lifestyle as he struggles to be accepted by Imaan's family. After leaving his house, Hammad takes a job at a porter which requires hard labour. In the quest to be suitable for Imaan, Hammad finds spirituality and the true meaning of religion along the way. Despite Hammad's efforts, Moulvi Aleem refuses to understand the idea of love marriage and is unable to forgive Hammad for being in love with Imaan. Due to family pressure, Imaan is forced to marry her cousin Abdullah and begs Hammad to return to his own family. Hammad, unable to suppress his affection for Imaan, is adamant on marrying her. Under nerve-racking circumstances and constant tribulations, Imaan, unable to disobey her father and concurrently feeling sympathy for Hammad, falls critically ill. Meanwhile, Hammad constantly disagrees to return to his home, adding to the helplessness felt by Imaan.

=== Season 2 ===
In the aftermath, Imaan is unable to recover from the burden on her heart and eventually dies. Hammad, left shocked by this incident goes into paralysis.

=== Season 3 ===
Two new characters, Farhad and Mahi, who hail from completely different economic and cultural backgrounds, are introduced. Mahi, who comes from an influential family, must adhere to the conventions and requirements of her family's class despite her true jovial nature. Farhad on the other hand belongs to a small town and is instantly drawn to the charismatic Mahi and soon forsakes everything for her. Though Mahi appreciates Farhad's efforts, she does not have the same feelings for him. In the quest to win Mahi's heart, Farhad finds himself forming a special bond with his creator and becomes a devotee of love.

== Cast and characters ==
Character	Portrayed by		
Character	Season 1	Season 2	Season 3
Hammad Raza/Maddy	Imran Abbas	Imran Abbas	N/A
Imaan	Sadia Khan	Sadia Khan	N/A
Abdullah	Ahmed Jahanzeb	Humayoun Ashraf	N/A
Sarah Isaac	N/A	Kubra Khan	N/A
Molvi Aleem Uddin	Salman Shahid	Firdous Jamal	N/A
Commissioner Amjad Raza	Firdous Jamal	Usman Peerzada	N/A
Kazim Shah	N/A	N/A	Usman Peerzada
Ghafoor Coolie	Shafqat Cheema	Afzal Khan	N/A
Shehla Amjad Raza	Maryam Shafi	Saba Faisal	N/A
Haya	Mona Shah	Hifza Khan	N/A
Nighat	Sadaf Umair	Sama Shah	N/A
Ibad Amjad Raza	Hassan Abbas Naqvi	Nabeel Bin Shahid	N/A
Sajjad Amjad Raza	N/A	Fahad Rehmani	N/A
Abreena	Farah Shah	Zoya Malik	N/A
Shakir Chacha	Khalid Butt	Qayyum Shahzad	N/A
Ahmed Siddiqui	Mohsin Gilani	Humayun Gul	N/A
Najma	Fazila Qazi	Munazzah Arif	N/A
Aakash	Zubair Khan	N/A	N/A
Kamran	N/A	Saad Qureshi	N/A
Dilawar	N/A	Irfan Khoosat	N/A
Narmeen	N/A	Wajiha Khan Durrani	N/A
Rebecca	N/A	Shezray	N/A
Sunny	N/A	Sadoon Ali	N/A
Rasheeda	N/A	Naima Khan	N/A
Farhad	N/A	N/A	Feroze Khan
Mahi	N/A	N/A	Iqra Aziz
Sikandar	N/A	N/A	Junaid Khan
Taimoor Shah	N/A	N/A	Mirza Zain Baig
Naheed	N/A	N/A	Momina Iqbal
Romana	N/A	N/A	Tooba Saddiqui
Darvesh	N/A	N/A	Noor ul Hassan
Maa Je	N/A	N/A	Hina Khawaja Bayat
Bari Sarkar	N/A	N/A	Rubina Ashraf
Sahiba	N/A	N/A	Sunita Marshall
Nisaar	N/A	N/A	Jawed Sheikh
Suriyaa Bibi	N/A	N/A	Asma Abbas
Taufeeq	N/A	N/A	Waseem Abbas
Arfa Begum	N/A	N/A	Seemi Pasha
Nazim Shah	N/A	N/A	Sohail Sameer
Rida	N/A	N/A	Mehar Bano
Sajjad	N/A	N/A	Fawad Jalal
Fariha/Farii/Chhoti	N/A	N/A	Hira Somroo
N/A	N/A	N/A	Saqib Sumeer
N/A	N/A	N/A	Saad Rasheed
Nooray	N/A	N/A	Malik Raza
Fakira	N/A	N/A	Fareeha Jabeen
N/A	N/A	N/A	Munazzah Arif
Incharge Ji	N/A	N/A	Shameen Khan
N/A	N/A	N/A	Alyy Khan.
Childstar	N/A	N/A	Harmain Galib
Childstar	N/A	N/A	Kainat Angel

== Series overview ==
Season	No. of episodes	Originally broadcast (Pakistan)	
Season	No. of episodes	First episode	Last episode
1	14	17 February 2011	26 February 2011
2	23	26 December 2016	1 April 2017
3	39	12 February 2021	5 November 2021

== Production ==
=== Development and casting ===
==== Season 2 ====
It was confirmed that season 2 of the series is in development and will be released in late 2016. Syed Ali Raza Usama was reported to direct the season while Imran Abbas and Sadia Khan confirmed returning as Hammad and Imaan. Later on, Kubra Khan also joined the cast as a parallel lead. When asked about the plot of this season, Abbas clarified that the season will repeat the events of the first season however they are more detailed this time.

==== Season 3 ====
Babar Javed announced the next season with Imran returning. However, it was revealed that Babar was replaced by Abdullah Kadwani as Head of the network. Abdullah revamped the whole project by casting Feroze Khan and Iqra Aziz as lead actors for the season with Syed Wajahat Hussain, directing the season, produced under Abdullah's own production house, 7th Sky Entertainment. Besides Feroze and Iqra, n, Tooba Siddiqui, Sunita Marshall, Asma Abbas and Rubina Ashraf were also reportedly going to join the cast. On 1 September 2020. Feroze posted pictures on his social media from the sets of the series revealing his character look in the season. The first teaser was released on 1 January 2021, at 08:00pm (PST).

=== Shooting locations ===
Season	Shooting location(s)
1	(Pakistan) Bahawalpur
2	(Pakistan) Lahore, Bahawalpur, (United States) Houston, Washington, D.C.
3	(Pakistan) Multan, Lahore, Bahawalpur

== Soundtracks ==
=== Season 1 ===
The original soundtrack of Khuda Aur Mohabbat's season 1 was sung by Ahmed Jahanzeb while the lyrics were penned by producer, Javeria Saud.

=== Season 2 ===
The original soundtrack of Khuda Aur Mohabbat's season 2 is composed and sung by Ahmed Jahanzeb and Rahat Fateh Ali Khan and Afshan Fawad while the lyrics are penned down by the producer Hammad Abu Huraira.

=== Season 3 ===
The original soundtrack of Khuda Aur Mohabbat's season 3 was released on 29 January 2021, at 08:00pm (PST). The OST is composed by Naveed Nashad and lyrics are penned down by Qamar Nashad and it is sung by Rahat Fateh Ali Khan and Nish Asher. It achieved more than million views within 15 hours. It currently has over 320 million views on YouTube, making it Geo's most popular video on YouTube.

== Accolades ==
=== Season 1 ===
- Best Original Soundtrack-Ahmed Jahanzeb-Nominated

=== Season 2 ===
- Best TV Actor-Imran Abbas-Nominated

=== Season 3 ===
Ceremony	Categories	Recipients	Result
21st Lux Style Awards	Best TV Play	Khuda Aur Mohabbat	Nominated
21st Lux Style Awards	Best TV Actor-Viewers' Choice	Feroze Khan	Won
21st Lux Style Awards	Best TV Track	Rahat Fateh Ali Khan, Nish Asher & Naveed Nashad	Won
