= Parizaad =

2021 Pakistani television series

- cover-title-of-Parizad
- Genre: Drama
- Based on: Parizaad by Hashim Nadeem
- Written by: Hashim Nadeem
- Directed by: Shahzad Kashmiri
- Starring: Ahmed Ali Akbar; Yumna Zaidi; Ushna Shah; Mashal Khan; Urwa Hocane; Nauman Ijaz; Saboor Aly
- Country of origin: Pakistan
- Original language: Urdu
- No. of episodes: 29

Production
- Running time: 38-40 minutes
- Production company: MD Productions

Original release
- Network: Hum TV
- Release: 20 July 2021 – 1 February 2022

Parizaad (Urdu: پری‌زاد, lit. 'Fairy's child') is a Pakistani television series written by Hashim Nadeem, based on his novel of the same name, directed by Shahzad Kashmiri and produced by Momina Duraid Productions. It first started airing on Hum Television on 20 July 2021. The series stars Ahmed Ali Akbar in the title role alongside Yumna Zaidi, Ushna Shah, Nauman Ijaz, Mashal Khan, Urwa Hocane and Saboor Aly in prominent roles.

The last episode was aired in cinemas on 28 January 2022 and on television on 1 February 2022. The second season of the series is in development.

The series received critical acclaim with praise towards the script, direction, tackling the societal issues and Akbar's performance, who later won Best Actor and Best Actor Popular awards at 8th Hum Awards and Best TV Actor-Critics' choice at 21st Lux Style Awards. It also won Best TV Play and Best TV Writer award at the latter.

== Plot ==
The story revolves around a dark-skinned college student, Parizaad, has grown up with self-esteem problems and confidence issues. Despite society's judgement of him, he is very hardworking, extremely respectful and well-mannered, and creates a lasting impression on anyone he meets. This drama takes us along his journey of the friends and enemies he meets in his life as he tackles with his inner fight of choosing his true passion of poetry or choosing a realistic job that can provide income for his family. Parizaad is an innocent boy living in Rawalpindi with his brothers. Due to his dark skin, he is often ridiculed. His brothers and sisters-in-law are greedy and consider him to be a liability. Only his sister Saeeda loves him. But she is to be married to an aged man due to family pressure. Parizaad loves Naheed and Saeeda likes Majid but both Naheed and Majid are already in love with each other.

One day Parizaad is falsely accused of giving a love letter to Naheed at her house. Naheed's father slaps Parizaad in front of everyone. After learning that Naheed loves Majid and it was Majid who was at her terrace that night, Parizaad wants to kill himself, but is saved by Ahmad. On the other hand, Naheed marries Majid.

After this Parizaad meets Bubly, who considers herself a 'tomboy'. As Parizaad is desperately in need of money for his sister, he agrees to marry Bubly to obtain dowry. But before all this an happen, Bubly runs away from her house.

Then Parizaad meets Lubna, a rich girl, and starts developing a liking for her, but her mother fixes her marriage with a rich businessman. The mother also rebukes Parizaad regarding his poetry and asks him to focus on becoming a rich man. Then Parizaad moves to Karachi where he starts working for a big businessman, Behroze Karim who unbeknownst to Parizaad at that time, is a don who owns a mafia empire. Parizaad initially works as a shift supervisor in the factory of Don Behroze. Don Behroze inspired by Parizaad's truthfulness and bravery, appoints him as the bodyguard of his wife Layla Saba. Parizaad was also ordered to give all the information about Layla to Behroze. Layla is disloyal to Behroze and uses Parizaad's innocence so as to meet her lover. Behroze learns about this and he kills both Layla and her lover, but spares Parizaad. As Layla's lover was from a powerful background, Behroze gets trapped in his murder case. Behroze sends Parizaad to Guru so that Parizaad remains safe. There Parizaad meets Bubly who was adopted by Guru, Parizaad reconciles Bubly with her parents. After returning to Karachi, Parizaad takes all the blame and is sent to jail. Finally, it is known that Behroze was the one who killed both Layla and her lover. Before being caught, Behroze kills himself and gives all his wealth to Parizaad as a reward for his loyalty.

After becoming rich and coming out of jail, Parizaad sees that everybody respects him as he is a wealthy man now. Even people have no problem with his dark skin. His brothers and sisters-in-law due to their greed show affection and love for Parizaad. Parizaad again meets Lubna who is now a divorcee and a flop actress, Parizaad decides to finance her films. During this he also meets Ahmad. Parizaad now again meets Naheed who is now in a poor condition as her husband is now a good-for-nothing man. Naheed's father apologises to Parizaad as he is now aware that Parizaad was innocent at the time. Parizaad arranges a job for Nahaeed's sister and for Majid. Naheed too now has a change of heart for Parizaad due to his wealth and tries to reconnect with him, which Parizaad declines.

At the end he meets Annie, a radio host, who is a blind girl and a die-hard fan of Parizaad not because of his wealth but truly because of his poetry. Parizaad also develops a feeling for her, but is afraid that he might again get rejected due to his dark skin, once Annie gets back her eyesight. Annie's cousin, a new character, Sharjeel, also interferes with Parizaad's love, by confessing his plans to propose once Annie gets back her eyesight, not knowing Parizaad is in love with Annie. Parizaad in a moment of weakness decides to have Sharjeel killed by his bodyguard, Akbar, however his inner conscious stops him. Heartbroken once again realizing that even with money and power he is unable to capture true love, Parizaad leaves Karachi, leaving all his wealth behind. He goes to the mountains away from the pain of the world to ease his broken heart. There he becomes a teacher in the mountain village school and finds satisfaction helping children learn and prepare for the world ahead. No one knows about Parizaad's whereabouts as he discreetly leaves behind everything. Annie meets Parizaad while working as a news anchor, but fails to recognize him as he has changed his name. After hearing his voice and touching his face, she recognizes him and both of them confess their love for each other and the story ends with Parizaad finally getting his love. Annie and Parizaad plan on opening an Urdu academy in the Village. Annie plans on working as an assistant for the Urdu academy while starting her radio broadcast from the village.

== Cast ==
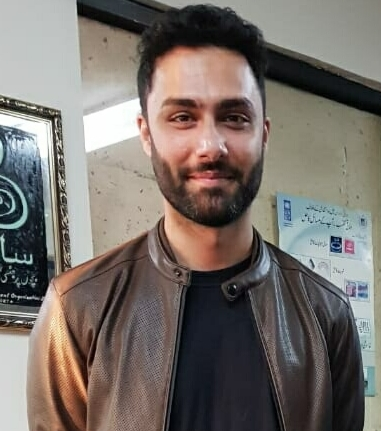
Ahmed Ali Akbar plays Parizaad in the series.

Name	Role	First episode appearance	Total episode appearances	Notes
Main character
Ahmed Ali Akbar	Parizaad	Episode 1	29	Dark-skinned poet and later a millionaire
Prominent characters
Ushna Shah	Naheed	Episode 1	7	Daughter of Mirza, Parizaad's first love and later Majid's wife
Saboor Aly	Saima/Bubbly/Dilawar	Episode 4	7	Struggles with gender dysphoria and is Parizaad's second love
Mashal Khan	Lubna/Mahpara	Episode 6	8	Drama artist and Parizaad's third love
Nauman Ijaz	Agha Behroze Karim	Episode 10	5	Parizaad's former boss and Layla Saba's husband
Urwa Hocane	Layla Saba	Episode 11	4	Wife of Agha Behroze Kareem, a millionaire
Yumna Zaidi	Quratulain/Annie	Episode 20	10	Blind girl and Parizaad's greatest & final love
Supporting characters
Syed Mohammad Ahmed	Mirza	Episode 1	7	Father of Naheed
Ismat Zaidi	Sakina	Episode 1	5	Mother of Naheed
Adnan Shah Tipu	Akbar	Episode 1	6	Eldest brother of Parizaad
Madiha Rizvi	Kubra	Episode 1	5	Akbar's wife
Paras Masroor	Asghar	Episode 1	6	Younger brother of Akbar and elder brother of Parizaad
Asma Malik	Sughra	Episode 1	5	Asghar's wife
Kiran Tabeir	Saeeda	Episode 1	7	Sister of Parizaad
Ahmad Taha Ghani	Majid	Episode 2	4	Parizaad's neighbor and later Naheed's husband
Taniya Hussain	Kanwal	Episode 1	4	Naheed's sister
Raza Ali Abid	Shauky	Episode 1	5	Parizaad's neighbor friend
Malik Raza	Saleem	Episode 3	7	Saeeda's husband
Tahira Imam	Saleem's mother	Episode 3	1	Asks for Saeeda's hand in marriage
Anjum Habibi	Saleem's father	Episode 3	1	Asks for Saeeda's hand in marriage
Salma Hassan	Shaista	Episode 4	4	Mother of Bubbly
Rashid Farooqui	Shabbir	Episode 4	4	Father of Bubbly
Adeel Afzal	Ahmad Nasaaz	Episode 3	8	Parizaad's college friend and poet
Natasha Hussain	Lubna's mother	Episode 7	3	Mother of Lubna
Asim Shah Kakakhail	Saith Noman	Episode 7	3	Business tycoon who wants to buy Parizaad's poetry to publish in his book
Hassan Shah	Janu/Shah Jahan	Episode 10	4	Parizaad's friend
Faiz Chuhan	Kallu Ustad	Episode 9	3	Parizaad's boss at workshop
Laila Zuberi	Hajjan Bua	Episode 4	3	Matchmaker of Parizaad's neighborhood
Saad Azhar	Feroz	Episode 11	4	Behroze Karim's personal assistant
Mazhar Suleman Noorani	Akbar	Episode 17	10	Parizaad's personal assistant
Asad Mumtaz Malik	Guru	Episode 14	5	Behroze Karim's old friend and later Parizaad's friend
Nadia Afghan	Badar Munir	Episode 11	3	DSP who catches Behroze Karim
Saife Hassan	Sheharyar	Episode 11	3	IG who is a senior head of Badar Munir
Hira Umer	Sara	Episode 11	2	Layla Saba's friend
Iftikhar Ahmed Usmani	Kamali	Episode 17	12	Parizaad's manager, assistant and caretaker
Mazhar Noorani	Akbar	Episode 17	11	Parizaad's bodyguard and Feroz's younger brother
Huma Nawab	Shehla	Episode 22	4	Aini's mother
Areeba Alvi	Jharna	Episode 23	5	Singer at Parizaad's production house and Nasaaz's love interest
Fahad Mirza	Sharjeel	Episode 23	7	Aini's cousin
Shahzad Nawaz	Saith Shehbaz	Episode 20	4	Parizaad's business enemy
Nadia Hussain	Shehbaz's wife	Episode 25	1	Wife of Shehbaz
Saleem Mairaj	Manzoor	Episode 1	1	Parizaad's father
Mizna Waqas	Hamida	Episode 1	2	Parizaad's mother
Nargis Rasheed	Amna	Episode 1	1	Manzoor's sister

== Soundtrack ==
Na Puch Parizaadon Se

Soundtrack album by Asrar
- Released: 23 June 2021
- Recorded: 2021
- Genre: Television soundtrack
- Length: 4:43
- Language: Urdu
- Label: M.D Productions
- Producer: Momina Duraid

Music video
- "Parizaad" OST on YouTube

The official soundtrack of the serial was composed by Waqar Ali and sung by Asrar while the lyrics were written by Hashim Nadeem.

== Production ==
=== Background and development ===
Television actor Faysal Quraishi first decided to produce the series based on Hashim Nadeem's award-winning Parizaad, for which he approached a channel but was rejected. According to Quraishi, he wanted to cast Gohar Rasheed in the titular character at that time.

In May 2021, it was revealed that Parizaad will get a television adaptation, produced by MD Productions and directed by Shahzad Kashmiri. The writer revealed that the show was actually written as an experiment, much like his previous show, Ishq Zahe Naseeb.

=== Casting ===
Ahmed Ali Akbar was chosen to portray the titular role of Parizaad. Akbar was not the first choice to portray the character. Likewise, the role of Naheed played by Ushna Shah was previously offered to Neelam Muneer who rejected it. The role of Inspector Badar Munir was earlier offered to Nimra Bucha, but after her rejection the role was played by Nadia Afgan, who termed it as the "most enjoyable performance" of her career.

=== Principal photography ===
The filming was mostly done in real locations of Karachi, Rawalpindi and Islamabad. The Parizaad's College is Govt Gordon Graduate College Rawalpindi, Parizaad's House is located in Railway Colony Transit Camp Chowk Near Dhoke Ratta in Rawalpindi and the university scenes from Lubna's track in episodes 7-9 were filmed the Capital University of Science & Technology, Islamabad. The mansion of Behroze Kareem which was shown from episode 10 onwards is located in Gulberg Greens Islamabad, was visited by fans, had an online tour available and after the show ended was on sale. Urwa Hocane and Nauman Ijaz took part in the filming in May 2021. The last spell of the series was filmed in Salkhala, Neelum Valley.

=== Release ===
The initial teasers were released on 20 June 2021. The teasers received some negative reviews for making the lead character look darker than he actually is.

== Reception ==
=== Critical reception ===
Ahmed Ali Akbar's performance received particular praise from critics and gained international acclaim as well. In a review of the first 6th episodes, The Khaleej Times praised the Nadeem's script for its "maturity and sensitivity" and the performances of the actors especially Akbar's performance and opined, "From voice modulation to a diffident body language, a stoop-shouldered gait and eyes that remain downcast, Akbar has owned Parizaad’s character to the T, highlighting his insecurities flawlessly." In a similar take, The News International noted the "fantastic job" in the form Akbar's performance by "portraying to the viewer the insecurity of his character by affecting droopy shoulders, hands that reflexively contort to his back and a gaze that shifts to avoid looking others in the eye". In another review by same newspaper, the reviewer noted the portrayals of the rarely discussed societal problems like colourism and gender identity in addition to poverty, siblings bonds and the self identification. Regarding the track of the gender fluidity, a reviewer from The Express Tribune praised Saboor Aly's performance and Nadeem's script for the portrayal of the queer people. After the finale of the series, the same reviewer applaud the Nadeem's "exceptional writing" that "closes the serial with a hopeful voice" and was appreciative of Ahmed's performance, reviewing "Akbar’s body language, his expressions, his movements personified the anxious, lost and evermore defeated person he felt, desiring emotional security." In an year-ender list by the Dawn Images, the reviewer noted the direction, script and Akbar's performance and stated, the series as "a wonderful combination of mass appeal and intelligent writing, grounded in reality, but not above making that imaginative leap to increase its audiences understanding of the world around them."

== Sequel ==
In June 2022, writer Hashim Nadeem revealed in a cryptic social media post that the show would be getting a second season. In May 2024, CEO of the network confirmed that the series will have sequel and will be released in 2025.

== Impact ==
Due to last episodes of the series which deals with the poor conditions of Urdu medium schools in the farthest areas of the country, the Balochistan government promised to raise the standards of Urdu medium schools. Later, Ahmed Ali Akbar also shared the same on his social media account.

== Awards and nominations ==
Date of ceremony	Awards	Category	Recipient	Result	Ref.
September 24, 2022	Hum Awards	Best Drama Serial - Popular	Momina Duraid	Won	
September 24, 2022	Hum Awards	Best Drama Serial - Jury	Momina Duraid	Won	
September 24, 2022	Hum Awards	Best Actor - Popular	Ahmed Ali Akbar	Won	
September 24, 2022	Hum Awards	Best Actor - Jury	Ahmed Ali Akbar	Won	
September 24, 2022	Hum Awards	Best Writer Drama Serial	Hashim Nadeem	Won	
September 24, 2022	Hum Awards	Best Director Drama Serial	Shahzad Kashmiri	Won	
September 24, 2022	Hum Awards	Best Supporting Actor	Adeel Afzal	Won	
September 24, 2022	Hum Awards	Best Supporting Actress	Saboor Aly	Won	
September 24, 2022	Hum Awards	Best on-screen Couple - Popular	Ahmed Ali Akbar and Yumna Zaidi	Nominated	
September 24, 2022	Hum Awards	Best Onscreen Couple - Jury	Ahmed Ali Akbar and Yumna Zaidi	Nominated	
September 24, 2022	Hum Awards	Best Original Soundtrack	Momina Duraid and Waqar Ali	Won	
November 24, 2022	Lux Style Awards	Best TV Play	Parizaad	Won	
November 24, 2022	Lux Style Awards	Best TV Director	Shahzad Kashmiri	Nominated	
November 24, 2022	Lux Style Awards	Best TV Actor-Viewers' Choice	Ahmed Ali Akbar	Nominated	
November 24, 2022	Lux Style Awards	Best TV Actor-Critics' Choice	Ahmed Ali Akbar	Won	
November 24, 2022	Lux Style Awards	Best TV Writer	Hashim Nadeem	Won	
November 24, 2022	Lux Style Awards	Best Ensemble TV Play	Parizaad	Nominated	
November 24, 2022	Lux Style Awards	Best TV Track	Asrar & Waqar Ali	Nominated	
