= Khuda Aur Muhabbat season 1 =

Khuda Aur Muhabbat
- Season 1
- Starring: Imran Abbas; Sadia Khan
- No. of episodes: 14

Release
- Original network: Geo Entertainment
- Original release: 17 February – 19 May 2011

Season chronology
- Next → Season 2

Khuda Aur Muhabbat (Urdu: خدا اور محبت — English: God and Love) was the first season of Khuda Aur Mohabbat series that aired on Geo Entertainment. It is based on the novel of the same name by Hashim Nadeem. Imran Abbas Naqvi and Sadia Khan play the lead roles in the first season. The lyrics of serial's title song 'Karun Sajda Aik Khuda Ko' were penned by the producer Javeria Saud.

== Plot ==
Khuda Aur Mohabbat was based on a classic love story of two star-struck lovers as they struggle to fight for their love. Hammad belongs to an elite family and has recently completed his Bachelor's in Commerce. Hammad's strange encounter with Imaan, the daughter of Moulvi Aleemuddin, brings an immense change in his life. Hammad's love at first sight with Imaan forces him to leave his family and his lavish lifestyle as he struggles to be accepted by Imaan's family. After leaving his house, Hammad takes a job as a porter which requires hard labour. In the quest to be suitable for Imaan, Hammad finds spirituality and the true meaning of religion along the way. Despite Hammad's efforts, Moulvi Aleem refuses to understand the idea of love marriage and is unable to forgive Hammad for being in love with Imaan. Due to family pressure, Imaan is forced to marry her cousin Abdullah and begs Hammad to return to his own family. Hammad, unable to subside his affection for Imaan, is adamant on marrying her. Under constant pressure and tribulations, Imaan falls ill and Hammad is left to fight alone for their love.

== Cast ==
Character	Portrayed By
Character	Season 1
Hammad Amjad Raza “Maddy”	Imran Abbas
Imaan Aleemuddin	Sadia Khan
Abdullah Imam Sahab	Ahmed Jahanzeb
Maulvi Aleemuddin Sahab	Salman Shahid
Commissioner Amjad Raza	Firdous Jamal
Ghafoora Coolie	Shafqat Cheema
Shehla Amjad Raza	Maryam Shafi
Haya Aleemuddin	Mona Shah
Nighat Shakir	Sadaf Umair
Ibad Amjad Raza	Hassan Abbas Naqvi
Sajjad Amjad Raza	Fahad Sherwani
Abreena	Farah Shah
Shakir Chacha	Khalid Butt
Ahmed Siddiqui	Mohsin Gilani
Najma	Fazila Qazi

== Sequel ==
In 2016, Geo Entertainment released season 2 of Khuda Aur Mohabbat.
