= 21st Lux Style Awards =

Pakistani film awards ceremony

- Sponsored by: Lux
- Date: 25 November 2022
- Location: Lahore
- Country: Pakistan
- Hosted by: Fahad Mustafa; Tabish Hashmi; Mansha Pasha

Highlights
- Most awards: Parizaad (3); Raqeeb Se (3)
- Most nominations: Parizaad (7); Raqeeb Se (7)
- Best Film: Khel Khel Mein
- Best Television Play: Parizaad
- Best Song of the Year: "Afsanay" – Young Stunners
- Best Fashion Model: Nimra Jacob

Television/radio coverage
- Network: Hum TV
- Runtime: 1:47:11

The 21st Lux Style Awards were held on 24 November 2022 in Lahore, Pakistan.

== Winners and nominees ==
The nominations were announced on 23 November 2022.

=== Film ===
Best Film
Khel Khel Mein; Kahay Dil Jidhar; Sheenogai
Best Film Actor	Best Film Actress
Bilal Abbas Khan - Khel Khel Mein; Junaid Khan - Kahay Dil Jidhar; Faizan Sheikh - Udham Patakh	Sajal Ali - Khel Khel Mein; Mansha Pasha - Kahay Dil Jidhar; Marina Syed - Sheenogai
Best Film Song
"Nayi Soch" from Khel Khel Mein - Shuja Haider, Jabir Abbas, Nida Hussain, Fabiha Hashmi, Maria, Panah, Shehryar & Safeer; "Mastam" from Kahay Dil Jidhar

=== Television ===
Best Television Play (Viewers' Choice)	Best Ensemble Play (Critics' Choice)
Parizaad (Hum TV); Ishq Hai (ARY Digital); Khuda Aur Mohabbat (Geo TV); Chupke Chupke (Hum TV); Fitoor (Geo TV)	Dil Na Umeed To Nahi (TV One); Parizaad (Hum TV); Raqeeb Se (Hum TV); Chupke Chupke (Hum TV)
Best Television Actor (Viewers' Choice)	Best Television Actress (Viewers' Choice)
Feroze Khan - Khuda Aur Mohabbat (Geo TV); Bilal Abbas Khan - Dunk (ARY Digital); Imran Ashraf - Raqs-e-Bismil (Hum TV); Danish Taimoor - Ishq Hai (ARY Digital); Ahmed Ali Akbar - Parizaad (Hum TV)	Ayeza Khan - Chupke Chupke (Hum TV); Mahira Khan - Hum Kahan Ke Sachay Thay (Hum TV); Yumna Zaidi - Dil Na Umeed To Nahi (TV One); Dur-e-Fishan Saleem - Pardes (ARY Digital); Minal Khan - Ishq Hai (ARY Digital)
Best Television Actor (Critics' Choice)	Best Television Actress (Critics' Choice)
Ahmed Ali Akbar - Parizaad (Hum TV); Bilal Abbas Khan - Dunk (ARY Digital); Nauman Ijaz - Raqeeb Se (Hum TV); Imran Ashraf - Raqs-e-Bismil (Hum TV); Sarmad Khoosat - Pardes (ARY Digital)	Hadiqa Kiani - Raqeeb Se (Hum TV); Iqra Aziz - Raqeeb Se (Hum TV); Mahira Khan - Hum Kahan Ke Sachay Thay (Hum TV); Yumna Zaidi - Dil Na Umeed To Nahi (TV One); Kubra Khan - Hum Kahan Ke Sachay Thay (Hum TV)
Best Television Director	Best Television Writer
Kashif Nisar - Raqeeb Se (Hum TV); Kashif Nisar - Dil Na Umeed To Nahi (TV One); Farooq Rind - Hum Kahan Ke Sachay Thay (Hum TV); Shahzad Kashmiri - Parizaad (Hum TV); Wajahat Rauf - Raqs-e-Bismil (Hum TV)	Hashim Nadeem - Parizaad (Hum TV); Amna Mufti - Dil Na Umeed To Nahi (TV One); Saima Akram Chaudhry - Ishq Jalebi (Geo TV); Sarwat Nazir - Pardes (ARY Digital); Bee Gul - Raqeeb Se (Hum TV)
Best Television Long Play	Best Emerging Talent in Television
Rang Mahal (Geo TV); Ishq Jalebi (Geo TV); Mohlat (Geo TV); Nand (ARY Digital); Benaam (ARY Digital)	Hadiqa Kiani - Raqeeb Se (Hum TV); Aymen Saleem - Chupke Chupke (Hum TV); Momin Saqib - Raqs-e-Bismil (Hum TV); Hassan Sheheryar Yasin - Pehli Si Muhabbat (ARY Digital); Talha Chahour - Jo Bichar Gaye (Geo TV)
Best Television Track
Khuda Aur Mohabbat (Geo TV) - Sung by: Rahat Fateh Ali Khan & Nish Asher; Composed by: Naveed Nashad; Fitoor (Geo TV); Parizaad (Hum TV); Hum Kahan Ke Sachay Thay (Hum TV); Chupke Chupke (Hum TV)

=== Music ===
Best Song of the Year	Best Singer of the Year
"Afsanay" - Young Stunners; "Balaghal Ula Bi Kamaalihi" - Ali Zafar; "Haaray" - Abdul Hannan; "Larsha Pekhawar" - Ali Zafar & Gul Panra; "Na Cher Malangaan" - Farhan Saeed & Aima Baig	Ali Zafar - "Pehli Si Muhabbat (Unplugged)"; Ali Zafar - "Balaghal Ula Bi Kamaalihi"; Ali Zafar - "Paharon Ki Qasam"; Young Stunners - "Afsanay"; Young Stunners - "Why Not Meri Jaan"
Best Music Youth Icon	Best Music Producer
Khawaja Danish Saleem; Maanu; Natasha Baig	Abdullah Siddiqui; Sameer Baig; Sinnan Fazwani & Zahid Qureshi; Talal Qureshi
Best Live Performance
Natasha Baig - Lahooti Melo; Ali Tariq - Cedar College; Ali Tariq - The Carnival of Spirits; Taha G - Mann Mein Tu; Taha G - Pyaar Da Meter

=== Fashion ===
Best Fashion Model of the Year	Best Fashion Forward Brand
Nimra Jacob; Fahmeen Ansari; Maha Tahirani; Mushk Kaleem; Sachal Afzal	Hussain Rehar; Ali Xeeshan; Fahad Hussayn; Generation; Kamiar Rokni
Best Fashion Makeup & Hair Artist	Best Fashion Photographer/Videographer
Sunil Nawab; Arshad Khan; Leonard Dscorpio; Shainal; Syed Hussain	Ashna Khan; Aleena Naqvi; Farhan Sherwani (Stopstyle); Hussain Mahmood (MHM Photography); Umair Bin Nisar
Best Fashion Stylist	Best Fashion Style Icon
Yasser Dar; Alishay Adnan; Maheen Shayanae; Mavi Kayani; Zahra Sarfaraz	Fouzia Aman; Hasnain Lehri

=== Honorary ===
Chairperson's Lifetime Achievement Award	Life Time Achievement Award in Fashion	Lux Changemaker Award
Anjuman	Fifi Haroon	Nazia Hassan
