= Dino Ki Dulhaniya =

- Genre: Drama; Comedy; Romance
- Written by: Muhammad Younis Butt
- Directed by: Mehreen Jabbar
- Starring: Feroze Khan; Sana Javed
- Country of origin: Pakistan
- Original language: Urdu

Production
- Producers: Abdullah Kadwani; Asad Qureshi
- Running time: 80 minutes
- Production company: 7th Sky Entertainment

Original release
- Network: Geo Entertainment
- Release: 16 June 2018

Dino Ki Dulhaniya (English: Dino's Bride) is a 2018 Pakistani tele-film directed by Mehreen Jabbar, written by Muhammad Younis Butt and produced by Abdullah Kadwani and Asad Qureshi under the 7th Sky Entertainment banner. The tele-film stars Feroze Khan and Sana Javed in the lead roles. The film was released in June 2018 as part of Geo Entertainment's Eid programming.

== Synopsis ==
When the lazy and careless Dino is fired, he calls his grandmother (Dadi) to claim his deceased parents’ inheritance. Dadi knowing Dino well tells him that he will only get the money once he is married. After being rejected by all his ex-girlfriends, Dino decides to hire an actress called Noor to play his wife while Dadi is visiting. Dadi immediately figures this out and hires Noor herself to teach Dino a lesson.

== Cast ==
- Feroze Khan as Daniyal Bari (Dino)
- Sana Javed as Noor Malik
- Ali Ansari as Arham
- Shamim Hilaly as Dino's grandmother
- Jinaan Hussain as Natasha

== Production ==
In August 2017, director Mehreen Jabbar revealed to Gulf News that her new project is a tele-film for 7th Sky Entertainment written by the notable humorist Muhammad Younas Butt who is known for Hum Sab Ajeeb Se Hain and political satire show Hum Sab Umeed Se Hain, This tele-film marks the second appearance of the trio of Feroze Khan, Sana Javed and Ali Ansari from the super hit show Khaani. The first promo of the film was released on 7 June 2018 on Geo Entertainment's official YouTube page and the film was released on 16 June 2018.

== Home media and digital release ==
The telefilm was released on YouTube by Geo Entertainment YouTube channel in June 2018 while in late 2019 it was made available on Amazon Prime Video.

== Soundtrack ==
The original soundtrack of "Dino Ki Dulhaniya" is composed by Saad Sultan and sung by Mustahsan Khan.
