= Khuda Aur Muhabbat season 2 =

Khuda Aur Muhabbat
- Season 2
- Starring: Imran Abbas; Sadia Khan; Kubra Khan
- No. of episodes: 23

Release
- Original network: Geo Entertainment
- Original release: 29 October 2016 – 1 April 2017

Season chronology
- ← Previous; Season 1 Next → Season 3

Khuda Aur Muhabbat is a 2016 Pakistani spiritual romantic drama television series and the second installment in the Khuda Aur Mohabbat series, produced by Babar Javed. It features Imran Abbas, Sadia Khan, and Kubra Khan in lead roles. The season premiered on 29 October 2016.

== Plot ==
Khuda Aur Muhabbat is a classic love story of two star-struck lovers as they struggle to fight for their love. Hammad belongs to an elite family and has recently completed his Bachelor's in Commerce. Following a chance encounter with Imaan, the daughter of Molvi Aleemuddin, Hammad's love at first sight with Imaan eventually leads him to leave his family and his lavish lifestyle as he struggles to be accepted by Imaan's family. After leaving his house, Hammad takes a job as a porter, which requires hard labour. In the quest to be suitable for Imaan, Hammad finds spirituality and the true meaning of religion along the way. Despite Hammad's efforts, Moulvi Aleem refuses to understand the idea of love marriage and is unable to forgive Hammad for being in love with Imaan. Due to family pressure, Imaan is forced to marry her cousin Abdullah and begs Hammad to return to his own family. Hammad, unable to subdue his affection for Imaan, is adamant about marrying her. Under nerve-wracking circumstances and constant tribulations, Imaan falls ill, and Hammad is left to fight alone for their love, but fate had already decided something else for Hammad.

== Cast and characters ==
Dr. Shehna Saqib Kubra Khan’s mother
| Character | Portrayed By |
| Character | Season 2 |
|---|---|
| Hammad Raza “Maddy” | Imran Abbas |
| Imaan Aleemuddin | Sadia Khan |
| Abdullah Imam Sahab | Humayoun Ashraf |
| Sarah Isaac | Kubra Khan |
| Maulvi Aleemuddin | Firdous Jamal |
| Commissioner Amjad Raza | Usman Peerzada |
| Ghafoora Coolie | Afzal Khan |
| Shehla Amjad Raza | Saba Faisal |
| Haya Aleemuddin | Hifza Khan |
| Nikhat | Sama Shah |
| Ibad Amjad Raza | Nabeel Bin Shahid |
| Sajjad Amjad Raza | N/A |
| Abreena | Zoya Malik |
| Shakir Chacha | Qayyum Shahzad |
| Ahmed Siddiqui | Humayun Gul |
| Najma | Munazzah Arif |
| Aakash | N/A |
| Kamran “Kaami” | Saad Qureshi |
| Dilawar | Irfan Khoosat |
| Narmeen | Wajiha Khan Durrani |
| Rebecca "Raby." | Shezray |
| Sunny | Sadoon Ali |
| Rasheeda | Naima Khan |

== Soundtrack ==
Khuda Aur Muhabbat

Soundtrack album by Ahmed Jahanzeb Aima Baig
- Released: 12 October 2016
- Length: 6:20
- Label: Geo Entertainment

== Awards and nominations ==
| Date of ceremony | Award | Category | Recipient(s) and nominee(s) | Result |
|---|---|---|---|---|
| 2018 | 17th Lux Style Awards | Best Television Actor | Imran Abbas | Nominated |
