= Sanwal Yaar Piya =

2025 Pakistani television series

- Television release poster
- سانول یار پیا
- Genre: Drama; Romance
- Written by: Hashim Nadeem
- Directed by: Danish Nawaz
- Starring: Ahmed Ali Akbar; Durefishan Saleem; Feroze Khan
- Country of origin: Pakistan
- Original language: Urdu
- No. of seasons: 1
- No. of episodes: 40

Production
- Producers: Abdullah Kadwani; Asad Qureshi
- Production locations: Karachi, Pakistan
- Camera setup: Multi-camera setup
- Running time: 35 minutes
- Production company: 7th Sky Entertainment

Original release
- Network: Geo Entertainment
- Release: 15 September 2025 – 27 January 2026

Sanwal Yaar Piya is a 2025 Pakistani romantic television drama series produced by Abdullah Kadwani and Asad Qureshi under the banner of 7th Sky Entertainment. Written by Hashim Nadeem and directed by Danish Nawaz, it stars Ahmed Ali Akbar, Durefishan Saleem and Feroze Khan in the leading roles. The series premiered on Geo Entertainment on 15 September 2025 and concluded on 27 January 2026, after 40 episodes.

== Plot ==
Piya is a young woman who lives with her parents, unaware of her father's past, while Sanwal works for Seth Daud, carrying out his illicit tasks. Piya moves to Sanwal's neighbourhood as her father, Aslam, attempts to escape his past. Meanwhile, Sanwal continues to mourn a love he once lost. Aliyaar returns home to find unexpectedly tight security arranged on his father's orders. Sanwal protects Piya and her family from an impending threat. Aslam keeps his distance from Sanwal, regarding him as a thug. Aliyaar is immediately captivated by Piya when he first sees her at university. With Sanwal's assistance, Piya begins tutoring children in the neighbourhood, while Aliyaar finds himself increasingly drawn to her. Aslam faces threats from goons attempting to force him out of his workshop, as Aliyaar grows closer to Piya at university. Aslam suspects Sanwal of being responsible for the threats against him, causing Piya to reconsider her opinion of Sanwal. Aliyaar spends time exploring the city with Piya, while Aslam's sudden disappearance leads to blame and tension between Piya and Sanwal. Sanwal finds Aslam and brings him home seriously injured. Meanwhile, Aliyaar becomes concerned when Piya mysteriously stops attending her classes. Sanwal faces a difficult choice when he is assigned a task involving Aslam's property, while Aliyaar visits Piya at her home. Aslam becomes uncomfortable with Aliyaar's visits to Piya's home, while Sanwal is caught between his loyalty to Seth Daud and his concern for Aslam. Sanwal and Aliyaar encounter each other for the first time during a heated road-rage incident, unaware of the connections between their lives. Having fallen in love with Piya, Aliyaar seeks Lubna's help. Piya discovers a startling truth about Sanwal that changes her perception of him. She also learns of Aliyaar's feelings, leaving her conflicted, while Sanwal is forced to confront his past. Piya remains upset with Sanwal, while Aslam decides to confront his rivals. As tensions rise, Sanwal seeks Shehryar's assistance. Sassi's painful memories resurface when she sees Sanwal again. During Piya's absence, Aliyaar visits her home and formally asks her parents for her hand in marriage. Zakia persuades Aslam to give Aliyaar a chance. Sassi visits Sanwal and promises to help him save Aslam's workshop. With Sassi's assistance, Sanwal succeeds in saving the workshop, but Aliyaar faces opposition from his own family over his intentions towards Piya. Aliyaar visits Piya's house with his family, where Aslam unexpectedly comes face-to-face with Seth Daud. Sanwal is heartbroken when he discovers that Aliyaar and Piya are in love. Tensions rise, creating a rift between the couple. Piya discovers a shocking truth about Aslam, leaving her distressed. Seth Daud assigns Sanwal a task that forces him to choose between loyalty and love. Sanwal betrays Seth Daud and warns Piya of the impending danger. Aliyaar becomes increasingly restless when he cannot reach Piya, remaining unaware of the threat unfolding around her. Piya confronts Aslam about his past and grows increasingly disappointed with him. Aliyaar sees Sanwal and Piya together, raising his suspicions and curiosity. He warns Sanwal to stay away from Piya, while Moosa changes his strategy and turns his attention towards Piya and Aslam. Seth Daud begins turning Aliyaar against Piya. Sanwal takes on the role of her protector, shielding her from Seth Daud's schemes. Determined to protect Piya, Sanwal risks everything and openly defies Seth Daud, while Aliyaar and Piya's relationship deteriorates. Sanwal accompanies Piya and Aslam to file a complaint against Seth Daud, exposing his betrayal and alerting Seth Daud to his defiance. Using his influence, Seth Daud has Aslam imprisoned, subjecting him to the full force of the law. Aliyaar is persuaded by his father's words. To help Piya, Sanwal takes her to Sassi, but they encounter danger on their way back. Aliyaar continues to follow Aslam's case closely. Despite the efforts of Sanwal and Waheed, Piya struggles to secure her father's release. Lubna urges Aliyaar to understand how much Piya needs him, while Sanwal, with Sassi's assistance, increases pressure on the police as Aslam's case reaches a critical stage. Before leaving the country, Aliyaar decides to meet Piya one last time. Piya agrees to meet him but brings Sanwal along. Aliyaar secretly continues helping Piya by collecting evidence of Aslam's innocence. Meanwhile, Piya finally manages to file a police complaint against Moosa. Sassi reveals her past relationship with Sanwal to Shehryar, prompting him to summon Sanwal to their home. Meanwhile, Aslam is released from jail. Aliyaar becomes suspicious after overhearing a conversation between Nisaar and Seth Daud. Seth Daud then targets Piya's reputation through a campaign of character assassination. Aliyaar struggles with the turmoil caused by recent events, while Piya faces renewed danger as Seth Daud sends goons after her. During the court proceedings, Seth Daud's lawyer, Khaqan, presents a strong argument against Piya's family. At the same time, Aliyaar discovers a shocking truth that changes his understanding of the situation. After Sanwal warns his enemies, Waheed counters Seth Daud's lawyer with a strong argument. Aliyaar also attends the court hearing discreetly. As the final hearing approaches, Piya begins to lose hope of obtaining justice, but Sanwal encourages her to continue. Aliyaar unexpectedly interrupts the final court session. With his help, Piya finally obtains the justice she has been seeking, while Sanwal sacrifices his own feelings for her.

== Cast ==
The principal cast and their characters include:

- Ahmed Ali Akbar as Sanwal
- Durefishan Saleem as Piya
- Feroze Khan as Aliyaar
- Yasir Nawaz as Seth Daud / Moosa
- Zainab Qayyum as Shaista
- Deepak Perwani as Khaqan
- Ali Tahir as Aslam
- Erum Akhtar as Zakia
- Sidra Niazi as Sassi
- Nayyer Ejaz as Waheed
- Saqib Sumeer as Nisaar
- Kamran Jeelani as Shehryar
- Rashid Farooqi as Nazeer B
- Imran Qureshi as Minister Behroze
- Yusra Irfan as Lubna
- Raza Zaidi as Tipu

== Production ==
Sanwal Yaar Piya was reported as an upcoming television project in October 2024, with Durefishan Saleem expected to appear alongside Feroze Khan and Ahmed Ali Akbar. By December 2024, production was underway as a photograph shared by writer Hashim Nadeem from the set showed Ahmed Ali Akbar with director Danish Nawaz. The project was produced by Abdullah Kadwani and Asad Qureshi under their production banner of 7th Sky Entertainment.

Danish Nawaz directed the series from a script by Hashim Nadeem. In an interview with The News International, Nawaz described the drama as his first project for Geo Entertainment with 7th Sky Entertainment and his first collaboration with the production company, writer and all three lead actors. He said the actors joined the project in response to the script. Nawaz also discussed the different approaches of the lead performers, including Ahmed Ali Akbar's transformation for his role and Durefishan Saleem's suitability for Piya, a character whose scenes required extensive location work.

== Broadcast ==
Sanwal Yaar Piya premiered on Geo Entertainment on 15 September 2025. It was broadcast on Mondays and Tuesdays at 8:00 pm Pakistan Standard Time. The series consisted of 40 episodes. Its final episode aired on 27 January 2026, concluding its television run.

== Reception ==
=== Ratings ===
Episode	Episode rating	Maximum rating	Episode	Episode rating	Maximum rating	Episode	Episode rating	Maximum rating	Episode	Episode rating	Maximum rating
Episode 1	9.6	10	Episode 11	9.5	10	Episode 21	9.4	10	Episode 31	9.3	10
Episode 2	9.4	10	Episode 12	9.4	10	Episode 22	9.5	10	Episode 32	9.3	10
Episode 3	9.3	10	Episode 13	9.0	10	Episode 23	9.5	10	Episode 33	8.8	10
Episode 4	9.2	10	Episode 14	9.1	10	Episode 24	9.3	10	Episode 34	9.3	10
Episode 5	9.4	10	Episode 15	8.7	10	Episode 25	9.4	10	Episode 35	8.9	10
Episode 6	9.5	10	Episode 16	9.5	10	Episode 26	9.4	10	Episode 36	9.0	10
Episode 7	9.6	10	Episode 17	8.9	10	Episode 27	9.5	10	Episode 37	8.9	10
Episode 8	9.6	10	Episode 18	8.9	10	Episode 28	9.4	10	Episode 38	8.8	10
Episode 9	9.6	10	Episode 19	9.5	10	Episode 29	9.3	10	Episode 39	8.6	10
Episode 10	9.6	10	Episode 20	9.4	10	Episode 30	9.4	10	Episode 40	5.1	10

=== Critical response ===
In an October 2025 review for Dawn, television critic Sadaf Haider discussed the series characters and storyline, highlighting Ahmed Ali Akbar's performance as Sanwal. She also described the contrast between Sanwal and Aliyaar, whose privileged background and family connections influence his relationship with Piya. The review examined the drama's family conflicts and the secrets surrounding Piya's background.

Writing for Youlin Magazine 2025, Hurmat Majid criticised the series for relying on familiar romantic and melodramatic conventions. The review described its love triangle and class differences as predictable, while praising its production values, cinematography, soundtrack and Ahmed Ali Akbar's performance.

Lakshana N Palat of Gulf News reported a positive response from viewers, who praised the series' love triangle, plot twists and lead performances. The article highlighted the central conflict between Sanwal, a grounded man, and Aliyaar, a privileged individual, both of whom fall in love with Piya, whose family background is marked by hidden secrets. Viewers particularly praised Ahmed Ali Akbar's performance and his on-screen chemistry with Durefishan Saleem. The report also noted that the series had received a TRP rating of 8.2, as reported by Har Pal Geo.

=== Audience response ===
The series' conclusion prompted discussion among viewers, particularly concerning Sanwal's decision not to marry Piya. Pakistan Today reported on 28 January 2026 that the ending disappointed some viewers who had expected Sanwal and Piya to end up together. The newspaper also described criticism of the resolution of the central love triangle and the treatment of Sanwal's character.
