= Jhok Sarkar =

2023 Pakistani television series

- Title Card
- Urdu: جھوک سرکار
- Genre: Drama; Action; Romance
- Written by: Hashim Nadeem
- Directed by: Saife Hassan
- Starring: Farhan Saeed; Hiba Bukhari; Asif Raza Mir; Mamya Shahjaffar; Usman Javed
- Opening theme: "Meri Matti" by Farhan Saeed
- Country of origin: Pakistan
- Original languages: Urdu, Saraiki & Punjabi
- No. of episodes: 25

Production
- Producer: Momina Duraid
- Production locations: Bahawalpur; Pakistan
- Camera setup: Multi-Camera
- Running time: approx. 40 min
- Production company: MD Productions

Original release
- Network: Hum TV
- Release: 6 June – 21 November 2023

Jhok Sarkar (Urdu: جھوک سرکار) is a 2023 Pakistani television series that originally broadcast on Hum TV. The series was produced by Momina Duraid, directed by Saife Hassan and written by Hashim Nadeem. It stars Farhan Saeed, Hiba Bukhari, Asif Raza Mir, Mamya Shahjaffar and Usman Javed in leading roles. According to the writer, the series is a tribute to the unsung heroes of the Police service. The plot revolves around the struggle of a police officer against the deep-rooted social evils in a town, Jhok Siyal.

== Plot ==
The series is about the tribal stronghold and lawlessness in a town named Jhok Sial, located in the desert in the neighborhood of Multan and Shorkot. Noori, a young girl from Jhok Sial decides to escape with Shaukat, the young man she wishes to marry, and only informs her friend Sassi that she is leaving. They succeed in escaping from the town but get caught on the railway station by the ruffians of the local landlord Peeral while leaving for Shorkot. They are both brought to the town and are imprisoned in the haveli of the Peeral, where Shaukat is sent to the jail. Peeral's feudal son Meeral considers it a matter of honour and ignites the villagers to punish them severely. However, Peeral gets smitten by the enchanting beauty of Noori and marries her, forgiving her stepfather's debt in return. The rebellious and furious Noori only agrees to marry him on the condition of Shaukat's safe release from the town. However, unbeknown to Peeral, his hot-headed son Meeral kills Shaukat.

Noori's friend Sassi comes to the haveli to visit her and gets noticed by the lustful eyes of Meeral. To establish relations with her, he includes her brother Jeevan in his special workers and sends him with his workers to engage in human trafficking.

Arsalan passes the CSS examination with distinction and is hired as an ASP in the police station of Jhok Sial. On his arrival, he not only finds the structure of police station as incompetent and disorderly but also merely a spectator to the prevailing feudalism.

== Cast ==
- Farhan Saeed as ASP Arsalan
- Hiba Bukhari as Sassi
- Asif Raza Mir as Peeral
- Ali Ammar as Jeevan
- Usman Javed as Meeral
- Mamya Shahjaffar as Noori
- Sakina Samo as Sardari Begum
- Mahenur Haider as Lubna
- Sajjad Paul as Junaid, Arsalan's friend
- Saqib Sumeer as Dhani Baksh
- Faiza Gillani as Zulekha
- Shazia Qaiser as Arsalan's mother
- Malik Raza as Inspector Jahandad
- Saad Azhar as Inspector Ramzan
- Mazhar Suleman Noorani as Sub Inspector Asghar
- Asad Mumtaz Malik as ASI Kundan Massih
- Asad Ali as Shaukat
- Adeel Afzal as Mukhtara
- Sikandar Nawaz as Iqbal, Shaukat's friend

== Soundtrack ==
"Meri Matti"

Song by Farhan Saeed
- Language: Urdu
- Released: 16 June 2023
- Length: ~ 4:00
- Label: Hum
- Composer: Adrian David Emmanuel
- Lyricist: Sibtain Khalid
- Producer: MD Production
External media
Audio
- Full OST on JioSaavn
Video
- Video on YouTube

The original soundtrack of the series was released in June 2023 in the vocals of Farhan Saeed, lyrics by Sibtain Khalid and music composition by Adrian David Emmanuel.

== Production ==
In January 2023, there were rumours of the casting of Zara Noor Abbas alongside Farhan Saeed and Dur-e-Fishan Saleem, however Zara Noor Abbas later confirmed through her Instagram handle that she is not a part of the project. In the March of same year, several publications reported that Hiba Bukhari has replaced the Saleem, and will now play the lead role. Talking to DAWN Images, Bukhari shared that she has always wanted to work with Nadeem. About the series, she revealed that it will be an action-romance.

The first look of the series featuring Saeed was unveiled by Hum TV on 6 May 2023, with the title Jhok Sarkar. The first promo was released on 21 May 2023.
