= 8th Hum Awards =

2022 Pakistani entertainment awards

- Date: 24 September 2022
- Site: FirstOntario Centre, Hamilton, Ontario, Canada
- Produced by: Hum Network
- Official website: https://hum.tv/humawards/

Highlights
- Best Drama Serial (Jury): Parizaad (2021); Ehd-e-Wafa (2020); Ranjha Ranjha Kardi (2019)
- Best Drama Serial (Popular): Parizaad
- Best Director: Shahzad Kashmiri
- Best Actor: Ahmed Ali Akbar; Parizaad
- Best Actress: Ayeza Khan; Chupke Chupke
- Best Supporting Actor: Adeel Afzal
- Best Supporting Actress: Saboor Aly
- Most awards: Parizaad (9)

Television coverage
- Channel: Hum TV
- Network: Hum
- Duration: 177 minutes
- Ratings: 6.2

The 8th Hum Awards by Hum Network celebrated the excellence in music, fashion, and Hum Television Dramas in 2021. The ceremony took place on 24 September 2022 at FirstOntario Centre, Hamilton, Ontario, Canada, and was later televised on Hum TV. During the ceremony, Hum Awards were handed out in 21 categories.

A portion of the revenue of tickets of the awards was donated to the victims of 2022 Pakistan floods.

== Viewers' Choice Awards ==
The nominations for viewers' choice awards were announced on 1 September 2022.

Best Drama Serial Popular: Parizaad – Momina Duraid Productions; Raqeeb Se – Momina Duraid Productions; Raqs-e-Bismil – Momina Duraid Productions and Showcase Productions; Hum Kahan Ke Sachay Thay – Nina Kashif and Momina Duraid Productions; Aakhir Kab Tak – Moomal Entertainment and Momina Duraid Productions; Chupke Chupke –Momina Duraid Productions
| Best Actor Male Popular: Ahmed Ali Akbar – Parizaad as Parizaad; Usman Mukhtar – Hum Kahan Ke Sachay Thay as Aswad Ayub; Imran Ashraf – Raqs-e-Bismil as Moosa; Nauman Ejaz – Raqeeb Se as Maqsood; Adeel Hussain – Aakhir Kab Tak as Nasir; Ahsan Khan – Qissa Meherbano Ka as Murad Ali; Osman Khalid Butt – Chupke Chupke as Faaz Ibrahim | Best Actor Female Popular: Ayeza Khan – Chupke Chupke as Maniha Kifayat Ali; Hadiqa Kiani – Raqeeb Se as Sakina; Iqra Aziz – Raqeeb Se as Ameera; Mahira Khan – Hum Kahan Ke Sachay Thay as Mehreen Mansoor; Zara Noor Abbas – Phaans as Zeba; Ushna Shah – Aakhir Kab Tak as Noor; Mawra Hocane – Qissa Meherbano Ka as Meherbano; Sarah Khan – Raqs-e-Bismil as Zohra |
| Best Onscreen Couple Popular: Osman Khalid Butt and Aiza Khan - Chupke Chupke; Ahmed Ali Akbar and Yumna Zaidi – Parizaad; Arslan Naseer and Aymen Saleem – Chupke Chupke; Imran Ashraf and Sarah Khan – Raqs-e-Bismil; Usman Mukhtar and Mahira Khan – Hum Kahan Ke Sachay Thay; Adeel Hussain and Ushna Shah – Aakhir Kab Tak | Best Original Soundtrack Popular: "Na Puch Parizaadon Se" from Parizaad – Waqar Ali and Momina Duraid; "Pareshan Kayun Laage Tu" from Chupke Chupke – Naveed Nashad and Momina Duraid Productions; "Hum Kahan Ke Sachay Thay" from Hum Kahan Ke Sachay Thay – Momina Duraid, Nina Kashif and Azaan Sami Khan; "Sanwal" from Raqs-e-Bismil – Shazia Wajahat, Momina Duraid and Hassan Ali; "Raqeeb Se" from Raqeeb Se – Momina Duraid and Hadiqa Kiani |

== Critics' Choice Awards ==
| Categories | Winners | Nominations |
|---|---|---|
| Best Drama Serial-Jury | Parizaad – Momina Duraid Productions | |
| Best Director | Shahzad Kashmiri – Parizaad | |
| Best Actor-Jury | Ahmed Ali Akbar – Parizaad | |
| Best Actress-Jury | Iqra Aziz – Raqeeb Se | |
| Best Supporting Actor | Adeel Afzal – Parizaad | |
| Best Supporting Actress | Saboor Aly – Parizaad | |
| Best Writer | Hashim Nadeem – Parizaad | |
| Best On-Screen Couple-Jury | Aiza Khan and Osman Khalid Butt – Chupke Chupke | |
| Best Performance in a Negative Role | Tie: Shehzad Sheikh – Phaans; Ahsan Khan – Qissa Meherbano Ka | |
| Most Impactful Character | Sania Saeed – Raqeeb Se | |
| Best Drama Serial (2020) | Ehd-e-Wafa – Saife Hassan & Momina Duraid | |
| Best Drama Serial (2019) | Ranjha Ranjha Kardi – Kashif Nisar & Momina Duraid | |
| Best Drama Serial (9 PM Slot) | Yaar Na Bichray – Moomal Entertainment | |
| Best Drama Soap | Wafa Be Mol – Momina Duraid Productions | |
| Best Television Sensation (Male) | Three-way Tie: Arslan Naseer – Chupke Chupke; Momin Saqib – Raqs-e-Bismil; Zaviyar Nauman Ijaz – Qissa Meherbano Ka | |
| Best Television Sensation (Female) | Tie: Aymen Saleem – Chupke Chupke; Hadiqa Kiani – Raqeeb Se | |

== Notes ==
- All six plays nominated for Best Drama Serial have been produced by Momina Duraid.
- Chupke Chupke has received the most nominations (6) so far.
- As usual Momina Duraid won every Best Drama award in a ceremony produced by herself.
