= Mera Yaar Miladay =

Romantic Pakistani television series

- From left to right: Ahmed Ali Akbar, Sajal Aly and Faisal Qureshi
- Genre: Drama; Romance
- Written by: Mansoor Mushtaq
- Directed by: Anjum Shahzad
- Starring: Faysal Qureshi; Sajal Aly; Ahmed Ali Akbar
- Opening theme: Mera Yaar Miladay by Rahat Fateh Ali Khan
- Country of origin: Pakistan
- Original language: Urdu
- No. of episodes: 24

Production
- Producers: Fahad Mustafa; Ali Kazmi
- Production locations: Karachi, Hyderabad, Sindh; Lahore, Punjab
- Running time: ~36 minute
- Production company: Big Bang Entertainment

Original release
- Network: ARY Digital
- Release: 8 February – 4 July 2016

Mera Yaar Miladay (Urdu: میرا یار ملادے) is a 2016 romantic Pakistani television series aired on ARY Digital. It stars Sajal Ali, Faysal Qureshi and Ahmed Ali Akbar in pivot roles. Produced by Fahad Mustafa and Ali Kazmi under Big Bang Entertainment, it was directed by Anjum Shahzad.

The show received lukewarm response owing to low viewership.

== Cast ==
- Sajal Aly as Mushk
- Faysal Qureshi as Dabbu
- Ahmed Ali Akbar as Fahad
- Firdous Jamal as Master Ji
- Faryal Mehmood as Mehru
- Saba Faisal as Fahad's Mother
- Saleem Mairaj as Aslam
- Ayesha Khan as Mushk's grandmother
- Zeba Shehnaz as Salma
- Jinaan Hussain as Isra
- Nida Mumtaz as Isra's mother
- Kanwar Nafees as Niaz
- Faiza Gillani as Muneeza
- Hina Rizvi as Bibbo Begum
- Danial Afzal Khan as Asad
- Beena Chaudhary as Mehru's mother
- Syed Fazal Hussain
- Asim Battal
- Shahid Naqvi

== Soundtrack ==
Mera Yaar Miladay – OST

Soundtrack album by Rahat Fateh Ali Khan
- Released: 28 January 2016
- Recorded: 2016
- Genre: Television soundtrack
- Length: (4:08)
- Language: Urdu
- Label: ARY Digital

Music video
- "Mera Yaar Miladay" OST on YouTube

The title song was performed by Rahat Fateh Ali Khan. The music was composed by Waqar Ali while lyrics were written by Sabir Zafar.

== Production ==
Earlier, the show was titled as Meri Jaan but the makers changed it to Mera Yaar Miladay.

== See also ==
- 2016 in Pakistani television
- List of programs broadcast by ARY Digital
