= Tahira Imam =

Pakistani actress

Tahira Imam is a Pakistani television and theatre actress. She appeared in television serials such as Sadqay Tumhare, Mor Mahal, Choti Si Zindagi, Ghughi and Parizaad. She also acted in a segment of A-Plus TV's morning show.

== Filmography ==
=== Film ===
- Dum Mastam (2022)

=== Theater ===
- Aadhi Baat (2010)
- Dara (2014)

=== Television ===
Year	Title	Role	Channel
1998	Rahain	Zeenat's sister-in-law	PTV
2000	Dopatta	Shaista	PTV
2012	Thakan	Nadira	ARY
2013	Sabz Pari Laal Kabootar	Arham's mother	GEO
2013	Kaash Aisa Ho	Bilqis	ARY DIGITAL
2013	Mere Harjai	Faiza	ARY DIGITAL
2013	Adhoori Aurat	Nusrat	
2013	Ranjish Hi Sahi		
2014	Bay Emaan Mohabbat	Dania's mother	
2014	Rukhsati	Waheeda	
2014	Sadqay Tumhare	Inayat	HUM TV
2015	Mumkin	Hina	
2015	Sanagt	Salma's mother	
2015	Vasl-e-Yaar	Adeela	
2016	Mor Mahal	Jaana's mother	
2016	Khwab Saraye	Sania's mother	
2016	Choti Si Zindagi	Sakina Furqan	
2017	Kaun Karta Hai Wafa		
2017	Rasmain	Safia	
2018	Noor ul Ain	Noor ul Ain's mother	
2018	Ghughi	Nandini	
2018	Visaal	Naheed's mother	
2018	Karam Jali	Rukhsana	
2018	Tajdeed e Wafa	Mumtaz	
2018	Mohini Mansion Ki Cinderellayain	Mukhtaraan	
2020	Qurbatain	Areeba and Saida's mother	
2020	Bin Badal Barsat		
2020	Be Adab		
2021	Parizaad	Saeeda's mother-in-law	
2022	Ibn-e-Hawwa	Zahid's aunt	
2022	Wehshi	Majid and Najib's mother	
2023	Meesni		
2023	Yunhi	Razia	
2023	Jeevan Nagar	Bilqees	
2024	Mann Jogi	Mariyam Yousuf	
