= Adeel Afzal =

Pakistani actor and screenwriter (born 1983)

- Born: 10 August 1983 (age 42); Quetta, Balochistan, Pakistan
- Occupations: Actor; screenwriter; storyteller; journalist
- Years active: 1997–present
- Notable work: Parizaad
- Awards: Hum Award

Adeel Afzal (born 10 August 1983) is a Pakistani actor, screenwriter, storyteller and journalist. Afzal used to make videos on social media and made his acting debut in 2018. He gained wider recognition with his portrayal of Ahmad Nasaaz in Hum TV's Parizaad for which he received the Hum Award for Best Supporting Actor.

== Early life and education ==
Adeel Afzal was born on 10 August 1983 in Quetta, Balochistan, Pakistan, to an ethnic Kashmiri family. His Kashmiri ancestors had migrated to the region of Balochistan prior to the partition of India. Afzal studied at the Islamia School in Quetta and graduated from the National College of Arts in Lahore, Punjab, Pakistan.

Afzal later joined journalism and worked for Daily Jang, a leading Urdu newspaper of Pakistan.

== Career ==
Afzal started his acting career in 2018 on television with Sarmad Khoosat and Kashf Foundation's Aakhri Station. In 2021–22, he appeared as Ahmad Nasaaz, a poet and a sincere friend of the protagonist in Hum TV's Parizaad which earned him wider recognition. He received critical acclaim and the Hum Award for Best Supporting Actor for his performance in the series. He then appeared in brief roles in Saife Hassan's Sang-e-Mah in 2022 and in Jhok Sarkar the following year. He also co-wrote the script of Kashif Nisar's directed Standup Girl, and portrayed a slacker poet in it.

== Filmography ==
=== Films ===
Year	Title	Role	Notes
2019	Zindagi Tamasha	Usman	
2022	Kamli	Usman	

=== Television ===
Year	Title	Role	Notes
2018	Aakhri Station	Parvez	
2021–22	Parizaad	Ahmad Nasaaz	
2022	Sang-e-Mah	Saifullah	
2023	Jhok Sarkar	Mukhtara	
2023–24	Standup Girl	Mirza	Co-writer
2024	Zard Patton Ka Bunn	Meirajuddin	

== Awards ==
Year	Awards	Category	Work	Result	Ref.
2022	Hum Awards	Best Supporting Actor	Parizaad	Won	
