= Feroze Khan =

Pakistani actor (born 1990)

- Born: 11 July 1990 (age 36); Quetta, Balochistan, Pakistan
- Education: Bachelor of Arts
- Occupation: Actor
- Years active: 2014–present
- Spouse(s): Syeda Alizey Fatima (m. 2018; div. 2022) Zainab Feroze (m. 2024)
- Children: 2
- Relatives: Humaima Malick (sister)

Feroze Khan (born 11 July 1990) is a Pakistani actor who works in Urdu television. Known for his portrayals of toxic masculinity in the media. One of Pakistan's highest-paid actors, Khan has received several accolades, including three Lux Style Awards.

He made his acting debut with Bikhra Mera Naseeb in 2014 and got breakthrough after appearing in Hum TV's romantic drama Gul-e-Rana in 2015 for which he received a nomination for Best Actor Popular at the 5th Hum Awards. Khan received attention and popularity after portraying Mir Hadi in the tragic-romance Khaani (2018) for which he gained acclaim and the Lux Style Award for Best Actor. His other notable works include the romance dramas Ishqiya (2020) and Khuda Aur Muhabbat 3 (2021); the latter earned him Best TV Actor at the 21st Lux Style Awards.

This success was followed by a career setback, with a series of unsuccessful dramas including Aye Musht-E-Khaak and Habs (both 2022), Khumar (2023) Sanwal Yaar Piya (2025) and Humraaz (2025) all were poorly-received. Off-screen, he was married to Syeda Alizey Fatima, with whom he has two children.

== Early life and family ==
Khan was born on 11 July 1990, in Quetta in the Balochistan province of Pakistan to a Pashtun father, who had been a tribal chief or sardar, and a Punjabi mother. He has five siblings, including actress Humaima Malick and singer-songwriter Dua Malik.

In 2018, Khan married Syeda Alizey Fatima Raza in an arranged marriage. On 3 May 2019, they had a son named Mohammad Sultan Khan. In 2020 there was speculation that Khan and his wife had parted ways. None spoke up about this until Khan’s wife posted a family photo, showing her with Khan and their son, on Instagram with the caption “Home” thus ending the divorce rumours. On 14 February 2022, Khan’s wife gave birth to their second child whom they named Fatima Khan. In September 2022, there were reports of Khan going to court in Karachi. A couple of days later on the 21 September, Khan posted a statement on social media revealing that he and his wife had parted ways, and that their divorce was finalised on 3 September 2022.

In June 2024 there were reports that Khan had tied the knot a second time. This was confirmed a couple of days later when both Khan and his sister, Humaima Malick, posted the announcement on Instagram.

== Acting career ==
=== Early work (2014–2017) ===
Khan began his career as a VJ on ARY Musik and later on became a model. He made his acting debut in 2014 with television series Bikhra Mera Naseeb as Harib. He then went on to play Aazer in ARY Digital’s romantic thriller Chup Raho, even though it was criticised due to its unauthentic, flawed dramatisation and misleading depiction.

In 2015, Khan starred as Humayun in the romantic series Tumse Mil Kay. The same year, he starred as Adeel Ahmed in Hum TV's drama romance Gul-e-Rana, a drama based on a novel, titled Hasti Ke Ahang, by Samra Bukhari alongside Sajal Aly. It was known as one of the popular series during its run, but received negative reviews and has been criticized for its misogynistic, sexist and regressive approach though Khan received a nomination for Best Actor - popular in Hum Awards and won the Best Television Sensation - Male.

In 2016 Khan made his Lollywood debut in Anjum Shahzad's drama film Zindagi Kitni Haseen Hay opposite Sajal Ali which was released on (Eid ul Adha) 13 September 2016. It opened to mixed reviews from critics and was moderately successful.

In 2017, he starred as Arish in Hum TV's drama Woh Aik Pal alongside Ayesha Khan and debutante Ramsha Khan. It received mixed reviews from critics, one who wrote that "what took the makers so long to wrap it up, because Woh Aik Pal was being stretched to the extremes without a need".

=== Breakthrough and success (2018–present) ===
In the same year, in 2017, Khan starred as Mir Hadi, the son of a rising politician who, out of anger, gunned down a university student, alongside Sana Javed in Geo Entertainment's drama Khaani which is loosely based on the real life murder of Shahzeb Khan. The series was a huge success and turned out to be a breakthrough for him. He earned Best TV Actor - Viewer's choice at Lux Style Awards.

In 2018, Khan appeared as Romeo Raja in the romantic comedy Romeo Weds Heer in which he reunited with Sana Javed. It opened to mixed reviews and good ratings.

In 2019, he played Armaan Salman in Dil Kiya Karay opposite Yumna Zaidi which didn't perform well in the ratings though it received critical acclaim. In 2020, Khan starred, as Hamza Khalid, in ARY Digital’s romantic Ishqiya opposite Hania Aamir and Ramsha Khan. The show received mixed reviews from critics, Khan received Best Actor (Popular) at 2nd Pakistan International Screen Awards. In that same year Khan declared that he would be quitting the showbiz industry saying that he would “only act and provide [his] services for the teaching of Islam...” In late December Khan rejoined the showbiz industry after claiming that his Sheikh ordered him not to leave.

In 2021, Khan starred as Fahad in the highly anticipated drama, Khuda Aur Muhabbat 3 alongside Iqra Aziz which premiered on Geo Entertainment, and ended up becoming the most watched Pakistani television series on YouTube but received mixed to negative reviews from critics, the story being considered problematic.

From 2021 to 2022, Khan then went on to play Mustajab Ahmed, a narcissist atheist who falls in love with a religious Muslim woman, in Aye Musht-e-Khaak alongside Sana Javed. In 2022, Khan portrayed Basit, an adult suffering the consequences of his childhood trauma and trying to navigate through life and relationships, in ARY Digital’s drama Habs opposite Ushna Shah.

== Off-screen work ==
=== Music ===
In October 2022, Khan announced on his Instagram story that he had launched his YouTube channel titled “FK”.

In November 2022, Khan released his single titled Maangain Sabki Khairain, a rap song.

In January 2024, he released another rap song, Mashware.

=== Boxing ===
In February 2025, Khan launched his amateur boxing career with his first opponent being social media personality Rahim Pardesi, the match held at the Lahore Expo Centre and which he lost via a 4-1 split decision.

==== Amateur boxing record ====
1 fight	0 wins	1 loss
By decision	0	1

No.	Result	Record	Opponent	Type	Round, time	Date	Location	Notes
1	Loss	0–1	Rahim Pardesi	SD	3	11 Feb 2025	Lahore Expo Centre, Lahore, Pakistan	

== Controversies ==
=== Divorce and following criticism within the industry ===
Khan's ex wife, Syeda Aliza stated in an Instagram post that their "marriage was filled with emotional and physical abuse as well as infidelity". She stated the mental and physical well being of her and her children are the reason for their divorce. The two are currently involved in a custody battle.

Following widespread criticism, Khan published a statement refuting the claims made against him with a long note on Instagram. Since the allegations broke, some Pakistani celebrities have spoken out in Aliza's favour including his co-stars Iqra Aziz and Ushna Shah, who demanded that Khan be blacklisted.

In November 2022, Lux Style Awards received massive backlash after they rolled out nominations for its 21st edition, where Khan was nominated for Best TV Actor category for drama Khuda Aur Mohabbat 3. LSA stated "submissions are received from artists and channels as part of an open call for entries for consideration in the awards. All shortlisted nominations for the Viewer's Choice Category are a result of exclusive viewer voting without any intervention by the Awards." For the unversed, the backlash has further intensified after the Khaani actor won the category for the same. The award was received by his sister Humaima Malick.

In January 2023, Muneeb Butt filed a complaint against Feroze for disclosing the personal number of his spouse, Aiman Khan.

== Filmography ==
Key
†	Denotes films that have not yet been released

=== Films ===
Year	Title	Role	Notes	Ref.
2016	Zindagi Kitni Haseen Hay	Zain Ahmed		
2022	Tich Button	Saqib Choudhary		

=== Television ===
Year	Title	Role	Refs
2014	Bikhra Mera Naseeb	Harib	
2014	Chup Raho	Azar	
2015	Tumse Mil Kay	Humayun	
2015	Gul-e-Rana	Adeel Ahmed	
2017	Woh Aik Pal	Arish	
2017	Khaani	Mir Hadi	
2018	Romeo Weds Heer	Romeo Raja	
2019	Dil Kiya Karay	Armaan Salman	
2020	Ishqiya	Hamza Khalid	
2021	Khuda Aur Mohabbat 3	Farhad "Feedi" Ahmad	
2021	Aye Musht-E-Khaak	Mustajab Ahmed "Bobby"	
2022	Habs	Basit Salman	
2023	Khumar	Faiz	
2024	Akhara	Dilsher	
2025	Humraaz	Saim	
2025	Main Zameen Tu Aasman	Shazil Sultan	
2025	Sanwal Yaar Piya	Aaliyaar	
2026	Shaidai	Ali Khan	
2026	Mohabbat	Yahya	
2027	Lakht-e-Jigar	TBA	

=== Other appearances ===
Year	Title	Role	Notes	Network	Refs
2017	Kitni Girhain Baaki Hain (season 2)	Arslan	Episode 25 "Raaz"	Hum TV	
2018	Dino Ki Dulhaniya	Dino	Telefilm	Geo Entertainment	
2020	Dil Tera Hogaya	Anwar	Telefilm	Geo Entertainment	
2024	Jodi Ban Gayi	Rohan	Telefilm	Geo Entertainment	

== Awards and nominations ==
Feroze Khan awards and nominations
Awards and nominations
Award	Wins	Nominations

Totals (Note: Certain award groups do not simply award one winner. They acknowledge several different recipients, have runners-up, and have third place. Since this is a specific recognition and is different from losing an award, runner-up mentions are considered wins in this award tally. For simplification and to avoid errors, each award in this list has been presumed to have had a prior nomination.)
- Wins: 8
- Nominations: 12

Year	Award	Category	Work	Result	Ref
2016	4th Hum Awards	Best New Sensation Male	—N/a	Won	
2017	5th Hum Awards	Best Actor Popular	Gul-e-Rana	Nominated	
2017	5th Hum Awards	Best Onscreen Couple along with Sajal Aly	Gul-e-Rana	Nominated	
2018	Hum Style Awards	Most Stylish TV Actor	—N/a	Won	
2018	6th Hum Awards	Best Actor Popular	Woh Aik Pal	Nominated	
2019	18th Lux Style Awards	Best Actor Male	Khaani	Won	
2021	ARY People's Choice Awards	Favourite Actor	Ishqiya	Won	
2021	ARY People's Choice Awards	Favourite Jodi along with Hania Aamir	Ishqiya	Nominated	
2021	2nd Pakistan International Screen Awards	Best Actor Popular	Ishqiya	Won	
2021	IPPA Awards	Best Style Icon (Male)	—N/a	Won	
2022	21st Lux Style Awards	Best Actor TV Viewers Choice	Khuda Aur Mohabbat 3	Won	
2023	22nd Lux Style Awards	Best Actor Viewers Choice	Habs	Nominated	
2023	22nd Lux Style Awards	Best Film Actor	Tich Button	Won	
