= Ali Kazmi =

Canadian actor of Pakistani descent

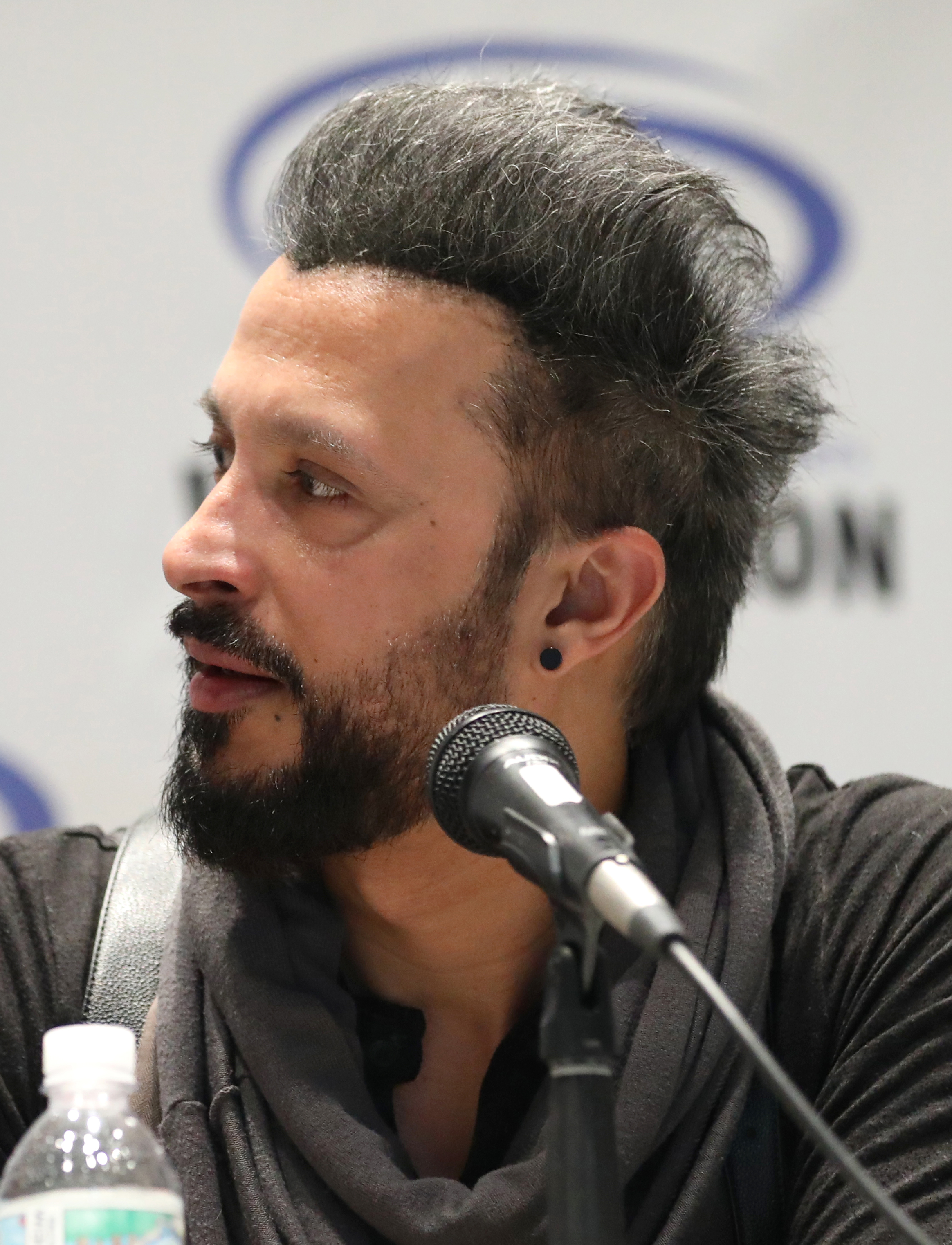
- Kazmi at the 2024 WonderCon
- Born: 31 October 1981 (age 44); Karachi, Sindh, Pakistan
- Education: Toronto Film School
- Alma mater: The Lyceum School
- Occupations: Actor, director, producer
- Years active: 1995–present
- Spouse: Alizeh Khorasanee (m. 2007)
- Parent(s): Rahat Kazmi; Sahira Kazmi
- Relatives: Shyam (grandfather)

Ali Arsalan Kazmi (Urdu: علی کاظمی; born 31 October 1981) is a Pakistani-Canadian actor, director and producer.

He appears in English, Hindi, Urdu and Punjabi language films and television series.

Apart from acting he has also worked as a host, director, producer and model.

== Early life and career ==
Kazmi was born to the actor Rahat Kazmi and Sahira Kazmi (née Ansari), a well-known TV director, producer and actress who's herself the daughter of the late Indian film actor Shyam, on 31 October 1981 in Karachi, Pakistan. He began his career as a child actor in 1995 TV series Zikr Hai Kai Saal Ka on PTV Home and then continued playing supporting or minor roles in television which includes Manzil (2006). By the age of 14, he was a model, dancer and professional actor.

After completing his studies from Karachi, he moved to Toronto, Canada in 2008 and began acting and modeling there by appearing in TV series, commercials and plays. He also worked at China Syndrome Productions as a director and producer. One of his initial major roles was as a villain in the film The Dependables (2014). He also played a negative role in Mehreen Jabbar's Jackson Heights which gave him more popularity in Pakistan.

In 2015, he starred in two commercially successful films, Rohit Jugraj Chauhan's Sardaar Ji (2015) and Deepa Mehta's Beeba Boys (2015) with Sarah Allen, Randeep Hooda and Gulshan Grover. Kazmi has also appeared in the short film Coffee at Laundromat (2015) for which he has won Best Actor in a Short Film award at the World Music & Independent Film Festival 2016.

He also appeared in Liam Neeson's short-lived TV series Taken (2016). "I play Marzoki, a fast talking, sharp, quirky analyst", said Kazmi in an interview regarding Taken. He appeared in Mehreen Jabbar's Dobara Phir Se (2016) and the animated film The Breadwinner (2017) produced by Angelina Jolie.

Ali was also signed to appear in Ajay Devgan's Shivaay. But due to not getting permission to shoot in Canada where Kazmi is based, some changes were made in the script and his role was removed. He then played the role of Abid in Tu Ishq Hai.

Kazmi's project Umro Ayyar-A New Beginning was expected to be released in 2022, but ultimately released in 2024, directed by Azfar Jafri under the banner of VR Chili Production. Umro Ayyar is an action thriller movie based on the revival of Persian legend of 90's. The other cast of Umro Ayyar is Usman Mukhtar, Sanam Saeed, Faran Tahir, Adnan Siddiqui & more.

== Personal life ==
Kazmi married his high school sweetheart Alizeh Khorasanee, whom he knew since the age of 12. They married in Karachi and settled in Toronto. They have two sons.

Kazmi speaks English, Urdu, Punjabi, Persian, Pashto, basic French and Arabic.

== Filmography ==
=== Film ===
Year	Title	Role	Notes
2009	A Message from the East	Iqbal	Documentary
2010	The Strip Mall	Rav	
2011	You Got Served: Beat the World	Dancer	
2013	Cold	Ali	Short film
2014	The Dependables	Raazaq	
2014	Americanistan	Mutaween #1	Short film
2014	Bang Bang Baby	-	Assistant art director
2015	Sardaar Ji	Bilal Chaudry	
2015	Beeba Boys	Guri	
2015	Jawani Phir Nahi Ani	Dr.Aamir Liaquat	Cameo appearance
2016	Coffee at Laundromart	Raj	Short film
2016	Dobara Phir Se	Vassay	
2017	The Breadwinner	Cousin, Fruit Seller, Market Voices	Voice role
2018	Motorcycle Girl	Zafar	
2018	Altered Skin	Nasir	
2019	Laal Kabootar	Noman Malik	
2019	Baaji	Rammy	
2019	Superstar	Shaan	
2019	Heer Maan Ja	Haider	Cameo appearance
2020	Funny Boy	Chelva	
2022	Ishrat Made in China	Shamshad / Chun	Dual role
2023	The Queen of My Dreams	Zahid	
2024	Umro Ayyar - A New Beginning	Maaz	

=== Television ===
Year	Title	Role	Network
1987	Dhoop Kinare	Dr.Ahmar's childhood	PTV Home
1995	Zikr Hai Kai Saal Ka	Suhail	PTV Home
2006	Manzil	Shabi	ARY Digital
2009	The Border		CBC
2011	Skins	Abbud's uncle	MTV
2011	Alphas	Internist	Syfy
2011	Combat Hospital	Chaplain David Nedayal	Global & ABC
2011	InSecurity	Nigel	BC
2011	Covert Affairs	Restorer	USA Network
2012	King	Sunil Sharma	Showcase
2013	Degrassi: The Next Generation	Doctor	Much
2014	Jackson Heights	Sikander	Urdu 1
2015	Aik Aur Aik Gyarah	Man at the garage	Hum TV
2015	Sehra Main Safar	Ayaz	Hum TV
2016	Rogue	Ali Zaid	Audience Network
2016	Taken	Marzoki	NBC
2017	Baaghi	Abid	Urdu 1
2017	Moray Saiyaan	Altamash	ARY Digital
2017	Badnaam	Afraz	ARY Digital
2018	Tu Ishq Hai	Affan	Hum TV
2019	Jaal	Arsal	Hum TV
2023-2025	Murdoch Mysteries	Younger Man & Clyde Dewala	CBC
2024	Potluck Ladies	Aamir	Hollywood Suite, Yes TV

=== Web series ===
Year	Title	Role	Notes
2017	Designated Survivor	Rami Bashir	Cameo appearance in Episode 17 of Season 2

=== Producer ===
Under the banner of Big Bang Entertainment.

- 2013: Meri Beti - ARY Digital
- 2014: Koi Nahi Apna - Ary Digital
- 2014: Dusri Bivi - ARY Digital
- 2014: Bahu Begum - ARY Digital
- 2014: Soutan - ARY Digital
- 2015: Rang Laaga - ARY Digital
- 2015: Mere Jeevan Saathi - ARY Digital
- 2015: Begunaah - ARY Digital
- 2016: Be Aib - Urdu 1
- 2016: Yeh Ishq - ARY Digital
- 2016: Waada - ARY Digital
- 2016: Muqabil - ARY Digital
- 2016: Be Qasoor - ARY Digital
- 2016: Andaaz-e-Sitam - Urdu 1
- 2016: Haya Ke Rang - ARY Zindagi
- 2016: Naimat - ARY Digital
- 2016: Tum Yaad Aaye - ARY Digital
- 2016: Aap Ke Liye - ARY Digital
- 2016: Saheliyan - ARY Digital
- 2016: Mere Baba ki Ounchi Haveli - ARY Zindagi
- 2016: Teri Chah Mein - ARY Digital
- 2016: Mera Yaar Miladay - ARY Digital
- 2016: Socha Na Tha - ARY Digital
- 2016: Dil Haari - ARY Digital
- 2016: Shehzada Saleem - ARY Digital
- 2017: Mubarak Ho Beti Hui Hai - ARY Digital
- 2017: Zaakham - ARY Digital
- 2017: Bilqees Urf Bitto - Urdu 1
- 2017: Bachay Baraye Farokht - Urdu 1
- 2017: Teri Raza - ARY Digital
- 2017: Aisi Hai Tanhai - ARY Digital
- 2018: Meri Guriya - ARY Digital
- 2018: Nibah - ARY Digital
- 2018: Babban Khala Ki Betiyan - ARY Digital
- 2018: Badbakhti - ARY Zindagi
- 2018: Balaa - ARY Digital
- 2018: Khudparast - ARY Digital
- 2018: Visaal - ARY Digital
- 2019: Cheekh - ARY Digital
- 2019: Bandish - ARY Digital

=== Video games ===
Year	Title	Role	Notes
2013	Splinter Cell: Blacklist	Hindi Soldier 1	(voice)
2014	Far Cry 4	Kaalinag, Bomb Maker, Monk, Rebel Soldiers	(voice)
2016	Far Cry Primal		(voice)

=== Theatre ===
Year	Title	Role	Notes
2009	The Indian Wants the Bronx	Gupta	Fringe theatre
2023	Behind the Moon	Ayub	Tarragon Theatre

== Awards ==
Year	Nominee / work	Award	Result
2016	Ali Kazmi	Best Actor in a Short Film at World Music & Independent Film Festival	Won
