= Saqib Sumeer =

Pakistani actor, director and writer

Saqib Sumeer is a Pakistani actor and screenwriter. He performs mostly in theatre, and also works in television and films.

== Early life and education ==
Originally from Bahawalpur, in Pakistan's Punjab province, Sumeer moved to Karachi to study Master of Business Administration, but then opted for acting at the National Academy of Performing Arts, where for three years his mentor was veteran actor Zia Mohyeddin. However, he was unable to make a name in dramas because he was not considered "handsome enough", so he concentrated on scriptwriting and theatre, endorsing mainly comic roles in Shah Sharabeel's plays.

== Career ==
=== Theatre ===
Sumeer has directed plays, including Hatim Tai in 2019, that he also co-wrote and where he played the leading role of Hatim al-Tai.

=== Television ===
In television, Sumeer started his career as a screenwriter, having worked for sitcoms like Ishrat Baji and Tanveer Fatima (B.A) and telefilm Baarish Mein Deewar. He made his television-acting debut in 2011, and is notable for his roles such as Dilawar in Khuda Aur Muhabbat (season 3) and Rafique Ali in Raqeeb Se.

=== Cinema ===
He made his cinematic debut in 2017 with Yasir Nawaz's Mehrunisa V Lub U.

== Filmography ==
=== Television serials ===
Year	Title	Role	Writer	Channel	Notes
2009	Tanveer Fatima (B.A)	No	Yes	Geo Entertainment	
2011	Kis Din Mera Viyah Howay Ga	Kami		Geo Entertainment	
2012	Shehryar Shehzadi			Urdu 1	
2014	Pyaray Afzal	Babloo		ARY Digital	
2017	Dumpukht - Aatish-e-Ishq	Haroon		A-Plus TV	
2018	Banglay Main Kanglay	Sikandar		BOL Entertainment	
2018	Apna Tou Style Yehi Hai	Aashiq		Play Entertainment	
2019	Bulbulay (season 2)	Ugly the Jinn		ARY Digital	Episode 9
2021	Khuda Aur Muhabbat (season 3)	Dilawar		Geo Entertainment	
2021	Raqeeb Se	Rafique Ali		Hum TV	
2022	Chaudhry and Sons	Sabir		Geo Entertainment	
2022	Bakhtawar	Haji Nazar		Hum TV	
2023	Kuch Ankahi	Harish		ARY Digital	
2023	Muhabbat Gumshuda Meri	Haji Nazar		Hum TV	
2023	Jhok Sarkar	Dhani Bakhsh		Hum TV	
2023	Ehraam-e-Junoon	Khawar		Geo Entertainment	
2023	Jeevan Nagar	Billa / Neelo		Green Entertainment	
2023	Kabuli Pulao	Ghaffar		Green Entertainment	
2023-24	Jaan-e-Jahan	Aamir		ARY Digital	
2024	Gentleman	Mozzam		Green Entertainment	
2025	Dil Wali Gali Mein	Ishtiaq		Hum TV	
2025	Sanwal Yaar Piya	Nisaar		Geo Entertainment	
2026	Aik Mohabbat Aur	Nabeel		Green Entertainment	

=== Films ===
Year	Title	Role	Note
2017	Mehrunisa V Lub U	Jani & Jani's father (dual role)	Film debut
2023	Super Punjabi	Jazzy	

=== Theatre plays ===
- Bombay Dreams
- Avanti
- Beech
- Bahara Ki Raat Ka Sapna
- Bananistan
- Tom Dick and Harry

=== Webseries ===
Year	Title	Role	Network	Notes	Ref.
2022	Mrs. & Mr. Shameem	Khurram	ZEE5	Webseries debut	

== See also ==
- List of Pakistani male actors
- List of Pakistani writers
- List of playwrights
