= Parizaad (novel) =

Novel by Hashim Nadeem

- First edition (Urdu)
- Author: Hashim Nadeem
- Original title: پری زاد
- Language: Urdu
- Genre: Novel
- Publication date: 2014
- Publication place: Pakistan
- Media type: Print (paperback)
- Pages: 240
- ISBN: 978-9-696-27929-7

Parizaad (Urdu: پری‌زاد) is an Urdu-language novel by Pakistani author Hashim Nadeem. The novel revolves around the titular protagonist who is always mocked due to his personality and name.

== Adaptation ==
The novel was adapted into a television series of the same name directed by Shahzad Kashmiri, and first aired on Hum TV in July 2021. Ahmed Ali Akbar played the titular character in the series.
