= Ahmed Ali Akbar =

Pakistani actor

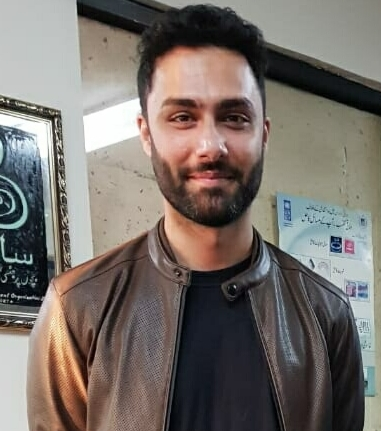
- Born: Rawalpindi, Punjab, Pakistan
- Occupation: Actor
- Years active: 2012–present
- Relatives: Abid Ali Akbar (brother)

Ahmed Ali Akbar (Urdu: احمد علی اکبر) is a Pakistani actor who primarily works in Urdu television. He marked his television debut in 1999 at the age of thirteen in PTV's drama Stop Watch. He guest-starred in the 2013 drama film Siyaah and started his professional acting career in 2014, since then he has appeared in several television series. Akbar is best known for playing the titular character Parizaad in Hum TV's biggest hit Parizaad in 2021 for which he won several awards including Hum Awards for Best Actor - Popular. His other notable works include Yeh Raha Dil (2017) and Ehd- e-Wafa (2019).

== Early life ==
Ahmed was born into a Punjabi family in Rawalpindi to tennis coach Muhammad Ali Akbar. His brother Abid Ali Akbar is a tennis player.

He claims to have played tennis on a national level before pursuing a career in entertainment. He also played cricket and football at club level. At one point, he wanted to pursue professional cricket but abandoned the option because of nepotism.

== Career ==
=== Early work as child artist, musician and theater actor ===
He marked his television career at the age of thirteen on PTV's drama Stop Watch, after which he was singing for a progressive rock band, the Islamabad-based Nafs, for some ten years before returning to acting on some friend's advice, in a play written by Osman Khalid Butt.

Ali made his stage debut in 2008 and received critical appraisal for his work.

=== Film debut and television success ===
He guest starred in his 2013 debut film Siyaah and started his professional television career in 2014, as a lead actor in the drama Shehr-e-Ajnabi.

He then grabbed one of the leading roles in Parchi, in 2018, which was well received at the box-office. He also directed the stunts for the film.

In 2019, he starred in Laal Kabootar, a crime-thriller movie set in Karachi, which is also music video director Kamal Khan's first feature film, sharing the screen with Mansha Pasha and Ali Kazmi, and which was well received by the critics. The same year he also worked in the hit drama serial Ehd-e-Wafa which was ISPR's presentation and aired on PTV Home and Hum TV.

In 2021, he was the lead role in Parizaad, earning critical acclaim for his acting and winning several awards, including Hum Awards for Best Actor - Popular.

=== Host ===
He hosted the first Hum Style Awards in 2016. He then hosted the Hum Style Awards in 2018 alongside musician Asim Azhar and was a co-host of the 9th Hum Awards in 2024.

== Filmography ==
=== Films ===
Year	Title	Role	Director	Notes	Ref(s)
2013	Siyaah	Faadi	Azfar Jafri	Cameo appearance	
2015	Karachi se Lahore	Sam	Wajahat Rauf		
2016	Ho Mann Jahan	Himself	Asim Raza	Cameo appearance	
2016	Lahore Se Aagey	Sam	Wajahat Rauf	Cameo appearance	
2018	Parchi	Saqlain	Azfar Jafri	Also the stunt director	
2019	Laal Kabootar	Adeel Nawaz	Kamal Khan		
2019	Heer Maan Ja	Policeman	Azfar Jafri	Special appearance	
2023	Gunjal	Shahbaz Bhatti	Shoaib Sultan		

=== Television series ===
Year	Title	Role	Director	Network	Notes	Ref(s)
1999	Stop Watch	—N/a		PTV	Debut	
2013	Burka Avenger	Peon	Haroon	Geo Tez	Voice Role	
2014	Shehr-e-Ajnabi	Haris		A Plus		
2014	Dusri Bivi	Aamir	Anjum Shahzad	ARY Digital		
2015	Ishq Parast	Hamza	Badar Mehmood	ARY Digital		
2015	Guzaarish	Zain	Owais Khan	ARY Digital		
2015	Nazo	Habeel	Aabis Raza	Urdu 1		
2015	Paiwand	Hassam		ARY Digital		
2016	Mera Yaar Miladay	Fahad	Anjum Shahzad	ARY Digital		
2017	Munkir	Gulraiz		TV One		
2017	Yeh Raha Dil	Zaki Haroon Baig	Siraj-ul-Haque	Hum TV		
2017	Phir Wohi Mohabbat	Waleed	Mohsin Mirza	Hum TV		
2018	Tajdeed e Wafa	Arsal	Ilyas Kashmiri	Hum TV		
2019	Ehd E Wafa	Shahryar "Sherry" Afzal	Saife Hassan	Hum TV; PTV Home		
2021	Parizaad	Parizaad Mir	Shahzad Kashmiri	Hum TV		
2023	Idiot	Gulzar	Anjum Shahzad	Green Entertainment		
2024	Nadaan	Haider Khan	Mehreen Jabbar	Hum TV	Mini Series	
2024	Faraar	Fasih	Syed Wajahat Hussain / Musadiq Malik	Green Entertainment		
2025	Sanwal Yaar Piya	Sanwal	Danish Nawaz	Geo Entertainment		
2026	Hurmat †	TBA		Hum TV		

=== Theatre ===
Year	Play	Role	Ref(s)
2012	The Taming of the Shrew	Tranio	
2014	Grease	Danny Zuko	

== Awards and nominations ==
Year	Award	Category	Work	Result	Ref(s)
2018	6th Hum Awards	Best On-Screen Couple - Popular (with Yumna Zaidi)	Yeh Raha Dil	Nominated	
2020	19th Lux Style Awards	Best Film Actor	Laal Kabootar	Won	
2020	South Asian Film Festival	Best Actor	Laal Kabootar	Won	
2022	8th Hum Awards	Best Actor - Jury	Parizaad	Won	
2022	8th Hum Awards	Best Actor - Popular	Parizaad	Won	
2022	8th Hum Awards	Best On-Screen Couple - Jury (with Yumna Zaidi)	Parizaad	Nominated	
2022	8th Hum Awards	Best On-Screen Couple - Popular (with Yumna Zaidi)	Parizaad	Nominated	
2022	21st Lux Style Awards	Best TV Actor (Critics Choice)	Parizaad	Won	
2022	21st Lux Style Awards	Best TV Actor (Viewers' Choice)	Parizaad	Nominated	
2024	23rd Lux Style Awards	Best Film Actor	Gunjal	Nominated	
