= Khuda Aur Muhabbat season 3 =

2021 Pakistani Spiritual Romantic Drama

Khuda Aur Muhabbat
- Season 3
- Title screen
- Starring: Feroze Khan; Iqra Aziz (Full Cast)
- No. of episodes: 39

Release
- Original network: Geo Entertainment
- Original release: 12 February – 5 November 2021

Season chronology
- ← Previous; Season 2

Khuda Aur Mohabbat (Urdu: خُدا اور محبّت, lit. 'God and Love') is the third season of the Pakistani spiritual-romance series Khuda Aur Mohabbat. Produced by Abdullah Kadwani and Asad Qureshi under 7th Sky Entertainment, it features Feroze Khan and Iqra Aziz in lead roles. The season premiered on 12 February 2021.

The series received high viewership ratings but mixed to negative reviews from critics, with particular praise for Khan and Aziz's performances, but criticism for a problematic story. The series is the most-watched Pakistani television series on YouTube, with each episode garnering over 2 billion views, for a combined total of over 60 billion hours watched.

== Plot ==
Mahi Kazim Shah and her sister-in-law Sahiba Nazim Shah arrive in Lahore from Bahawalpur to attend the wedding of Mahi's childhood best friend Rida. They belong to an influential family. A man named Taimoor Shah, Mahi meets can't stop thinking about her. A young man named Farhad Ahmad has made his father Taufeeq Ahmad stressed by failing his degree again and again, so he decides to send him somewhere to work. His father arranges for him to be a wedding planner at Seth Nisar's daughter's wedding. Rida is the daughter of Seth Nisar. Farhad and Mahi meet at the wedding, where they are initially at loggerheads but later their friendship blossoms. However, she befriended him for help in her mischiefs. Mahi uses this time as a release from her strict life at home and enjoys Farhad's friendship, but Farhad falls in love with her. Later, she went back. Farhad researches about her and gets job at her house via contacts of Seth Nisar who is best friend of Mahi's father Kazim Shah. He goes to Bahwalpur even after reluctance of his mother Rabya, siblings Sajjad & Fariha and his neighbour Naheed who loves him. There he starts working as a driver for Mahi's brother, Nazim Shah, and discovers that Mahi hails from a wealthy and influential family where it is difficult to see or speak to her. Farhad becomes friends with a man named Dilawar. Another female servant, Sajal, falls in love with Farhad, but he tells her that his love lies elsewhere, upsetting her.

Taimoor belongs to an influential family from Multan who tells his mother Jagirdarni Shaista Begum Shah and brother Sikandar Shah about wish to marry Mahi to which they agree after knowing that she also belong to similar family background. After meeting, Mahi's family agrees to have her marry Taimoor. Mahi initially doesn't want to marry but later prepares to, which upsets Farhad. When Mahi clarifies her real feelings to Farhad in a private library, he curses her, saying she will never find peace and will always suffer. Soon after, the news reaches Mahi and her family that Farhad has died after falling under a train. Despite this, Mahi's wedding proceeds, but when Mahi and Taimoor are on their way to their new home, Taimoor is fatally shot.

Rabya, reaches critical condition after hearing the news of Farhad's death and becomes depressed and obsesses about Farhad. The Derwesh is seen recalling his prophecy of how there will be shenai (wedding celebrations) and maatam (mourning). Jagirdaarni, is aware that an enemy of Nazim Shah has killed him and publicly holds him accountable. She refuses to allow Mahi to return to Bahawalpur, despite Mahi's mother requesting this. She demands that Mahi stay with her family and complete her Iddat for the sake of tradition.

Farhad is revealed to be alive and meets Romana and Chanda Ji on a train. Eventually, the train reaches Multan. Romana is the tawaif (courtesan) entangled with Sikandar.

The train stops, and Farhad goes to a shrine where he encounters the Derwesh, who welcomes him. Mahi's parents worry about how she is coping in unfamiliar surroundings with a new family in Multan, especially because of Jagirdaarni's obvious resentment towards the family following Taimoor's death. However, over time, Mahi develops a bond with Jagidaarni, who is taken by Mahi's affection towards her two grandchildren. After encountering Farhad on the train, Romana constantly thinks about him. She often mentions him to Chanda Ji – the head tawaif of the kotha – saying that Romana and Farhad are lovesick.

Now forty days after the death of Taimoor. Jagirdaarni reluctantly invites Mahi's family from Bahawalpur for special prayers despite remaining hostile towards Mahi. Jagirdaarni requests the Derwesh to attend the prayer gathering and make dua. He agrees and takes Farhad with him not knowing he is so close to his beloved. The Darwesh reaches the doorstep of the haveli and offers prayers there, returning from that spot.

While shopping for the mazaar, Farhad meets Romana. She brings him to his house where Sikandar arrives and meets Farhad. Jagirdaarni asks Mahi to forgive her for her harshness. Farhad and Mahi have dreams of their encounters. Meanwhile, Naheed is getting married and Rabya believes that Farhad is the man that Naheed is marrying. After realizing that Farhad is still gone, she becomes depressed again.

Back in Multan, after asking Sikandar's main servant where he was the night before, Jagirdaarni finds out that Sikandar went to Romana's house and couldn't come home because of heavy rain the night before. The servant requests that the family should prepare for Sikandar's new wedding. The Derwesh then asks Farhad to return to the same haveli they went to for dua.

Then, two servants ask Jagirdaarni to have Mahi marry Sikandar, to which she agrees because it is the end of her iddat, and she doesn't want Mahi to go. Later, Mahi secretly sends the same two servants to provide an invitation to a woman in the haveli Sikandar keeps meeting. When the girl, revealed to be Romana, gets the invitation, she is elated and decides to go there. When Romana and Mahi meet, they talk, and Romana decides never to meet Sikandar again. Later, Jagirdaarni asks Sikandar to marry Mahi, but Sikandar rejects this.

Romana becomes heartbroken over Sikandar. Mahi and Farhad meet for the first time since their talk in the library. Meanwhile, Sikandar learns that Romana has left and does not intend to return, so he decides to learn what happened to her.

Farhad and Mahi continue to have visual contact, and the Derwesh tells Farhad they will always meet each other. Farhad learns that Jagirdaarni repeatedly goes to the mazaar because Mahi's husband, Taimoor, was murdered on their wedding night when they were travelling back home by Kazim Shah's enemies, so they return here to pray. Farhad then remembers that he had cursed Mahi.

At the mazaar, Mahi sees Farhad and asks him why he made himself a mess and can't return home. Farhad replies that he will only return to his home with Mahi. Then, Mahi gives Farhad the taweez (necklace) he gave her, saying she will only wear it when he returns home. Farhad tells Sikandar that he has not seen Romana since he was at her house. Farhad then realizes that he can see Mahi within the taweez.

Then, Kazim Shah, Nazim Shah and Mahi's mother, Bari Sarkar agree to have Mahi marry Sikandar. But Mahi still loves Farhad, despite not wanting to. Mahi agrees to marry Sikandar and their marriage preparations begin. Farhad is invited to the haveli for Sikandar and Mahi's Rukhsati. Jagirdaarni offers that Mahi takes over the house. When Farhad arrives at the haveli, he is recognised and his family is informed that he is still alive. Farhad's family then visit the mazaar to make dua for Farhad. Farhad and his family then recognise each other. Farhad tells them that he will return home after the Derwesh, who is away, returns to the mazaar.

Mahi tells Farhad that they are not meant for each other in this life, but she would ask Allah to stay with Farhad forever in the afterlife. Nazim Shah learns of this and exposes Mahi and Farhad's relationship to her parents. He and Nooray then go to the mazaar and warn Farhad to stay away. Sikandar goes to the mazaar and learns of Farhad and Mahi's history together. Nazim Shah and Nooray tell Dilawar, Farhad's old friend whom they've hired, to kill a Derwesh at the mazaar, not telling Dilawar that the "Derwesh" is Farhad wearing the Derwesh's cloak. Jagirdaarni and Sikandar go to Kazim Shah's house and propose that Mahi marry Farhad, but he refuses. Nonetheless, Jagirdaarni decides that Mahi will marry Farhad. Meanwhile, Sikandar finds Romana and promises she will stay with him forever.

Dilawar stabs Farhad, not knowing it is him, and is shocked. Sikandar goes to the mazaar to save Farhad, while Jagirdaarni goes to Mahi's house and calls out Nazim Shah for planning the attack. Farhad gains consciousness and lies to the police officer in his statement saying that his stabbing was just a coincidence, therefore protecting his friend Dilawar. Farhad then tries to leave the hospital and go to the mazaar, hoping for Mahi to arrive and meet him. Dilawar takes himself and Farhad to the mazaar, while Jagirdaarni tries to convince Bari Sarkar to change her mind about Farhad.

Bari Sarkar convinces Kazim Shah to accept Mahi and Farhad's relationship, but Nazim Shah will not let that happen, and soon he holds Mahi at gunpoint. Kazim Shah arrives with a rifle and tells Nazim Shah that he will forget Nazim Shah is his son. Nazim Shah ultimately leaves. Kazim Shah lets Mahi, Bari Sarkar, and Jagirdaarni go to the mazaar and admits that after this, he will forget that Mahi is his daughter. Meanwhile, Farhad is lying down at the front gate of the mazaar with Dilawar by his side, desperately waiting for Mahi to come. Sikandar and Romana arrive to bring Mahi to the mazaar. Farhad sees them and gets up. Farhad and Mahi stare at each other until Farhad falls. As they talk, Farhad dies. Mahi, in shock, remembers her words about staying with Farhad forever in the afterlife, and then Mahi falls to the ground too and dies. Farhad and Mahi's dead bodies are shown together on the ground side-by-side.

== Cast and characters ==
=== Main ===
- Feroze Khan as Farhad "Feedi" Ahmad - Taufeeq & Rabya's son, Sajjad & Fariha's brother, Mahi's love interest
- Iqra Aziz as Mahi Taimoor Shah (née Kazim Shah) - Kazim & Bari Sarkar's younger daughter, Nazim's younger sister, Taimoor's widow, Farhad's love interest

=== Recurring ===
- Junaid Khan as Sikandar Shah - Sajawal & Shaista's elder son, Taimoor's elder brother, Rafia's widower, Sheher Bano & Shahzain's father, Romana's lover
- Tooba Siddiqui as Romana - a tawaif, Sikandar's lover
- Mirza Zain Baig as Taimoor Shah - Sajawal & Shaista's younger son, Mahi's husband, Sikandar's younger brother
- Noor ul Hassan as Darvesh
- Hina Khawaja Bayat as Jagirdaarni Shaista Begum Shah - Sajawal's widow, Sikandar & Taimoor's mother, Sheher Bano & Shahzain's grandmother
- Rubina Ashraf as Mrs. Kazim Shah aka Bari Sarkar - Kazim's wife, Mahi & Nazim's mother
- Usmaan Peerzada as Kazim Shah - Mahi & Nazim's father
- Sunita Marshall as Sahiba Kazim Shah aka Choti Sarkar - Kazim's wife
- Asma Abbas as Rabya Ahmad - Taufeeq's wife, Farhad, Sajjad & Fariha's mother
- Waseem Abbas as Taufeeq Ahmad - Rabya's husband, Farhad, Sajjad & Fariha's father
- Sohail Sameer as Nazim Shah - Kazim & Bari Sarkar's older son, Mahi's older brother
- Mehar Bano as Rida Faris (née Nisar) - Nisar & Afra's daughter, Faris's wife, Mahi's childhood best friend
- Javed Sheikh as Seth Nisar - Nazim's best friend, Afra's husband, Rida's father
- Momina Iqbal as Naheed Ramzan- Farhad's neighbour & one sided lover
- Fawad Jalal as Sajjad Ahmad - Taufeeq & Rabya's oldest son, Farhad & Fariha's oldest brother
- Seemi Pasha as Arfa Begum - Nisar's wife & Rida's mother
- Shameen Khan as Sajal - Shah's female servant incharge & Farhad's one sided lover
- Hira Somroo as Fariya "Fari" Ahmad - Taufeeq & Rabya's youngest daughter Farhad & Sajjad's youngest sister
- Saqib Sameer as Dilawar - Shah's driver & Farhad's friend
- Saad Rasheed -
- Malik Raza as Noora - Shah's main servant
- Fareeha Jabeen as Fakira - Mahi & Sahiba's maid
- Munazzah Arif as Chanda Ji - head tawaif of Romana's kotha
- Alyy Khan -
- Zeshan Khan as Faris - Rida's husband

== Soundtrack ==
The original soundtrack of Khuda Aur Mohabbat's third season was released on January 29, 2021, at 20:00 (PST). The soundtrack is composed by Naveed Nashad, while Qamar Nashad wrote the lyrics. It is sung by Rahat Fateh Ali Khan and Nish Asher. It has garnered over 300 million views on YouTube, making it the first Pakistani drama soundtrack to achieve this milestone.

== Production ==
=== Development and casting ===
After the finale of season 2, Babar Javed announced a third season with Imran returning. Later, it was revealed that Babar was replaced by Abdullah Kadwani as head of the network. Abdullah revamped the whole project by casting Feroze Khan, Iqra Aziz as lead actors for the season with Syed Wajahat Hussain directing the season. The season is produced by 7th Sky Entertainment, Abdullah's production house.

The first teaser was released on January 1, 2021 at 20:00 (PST). The season first aired on February 12, 2021, on Geo Entertainment and followed every Friday at 20:00 (PST). With just five episodes it crossed 100 million views on YouTube. It is the first Pakistani serial to have more than 2 billion views on its episodes collectively on YouTube. The season was slated to go off air on 29 October, but was delayed for a week and aired its final episode on November 5 due to Pakistan's cricket match in the 2021 ICC Men's T20 World Cup.

=== Filming ===
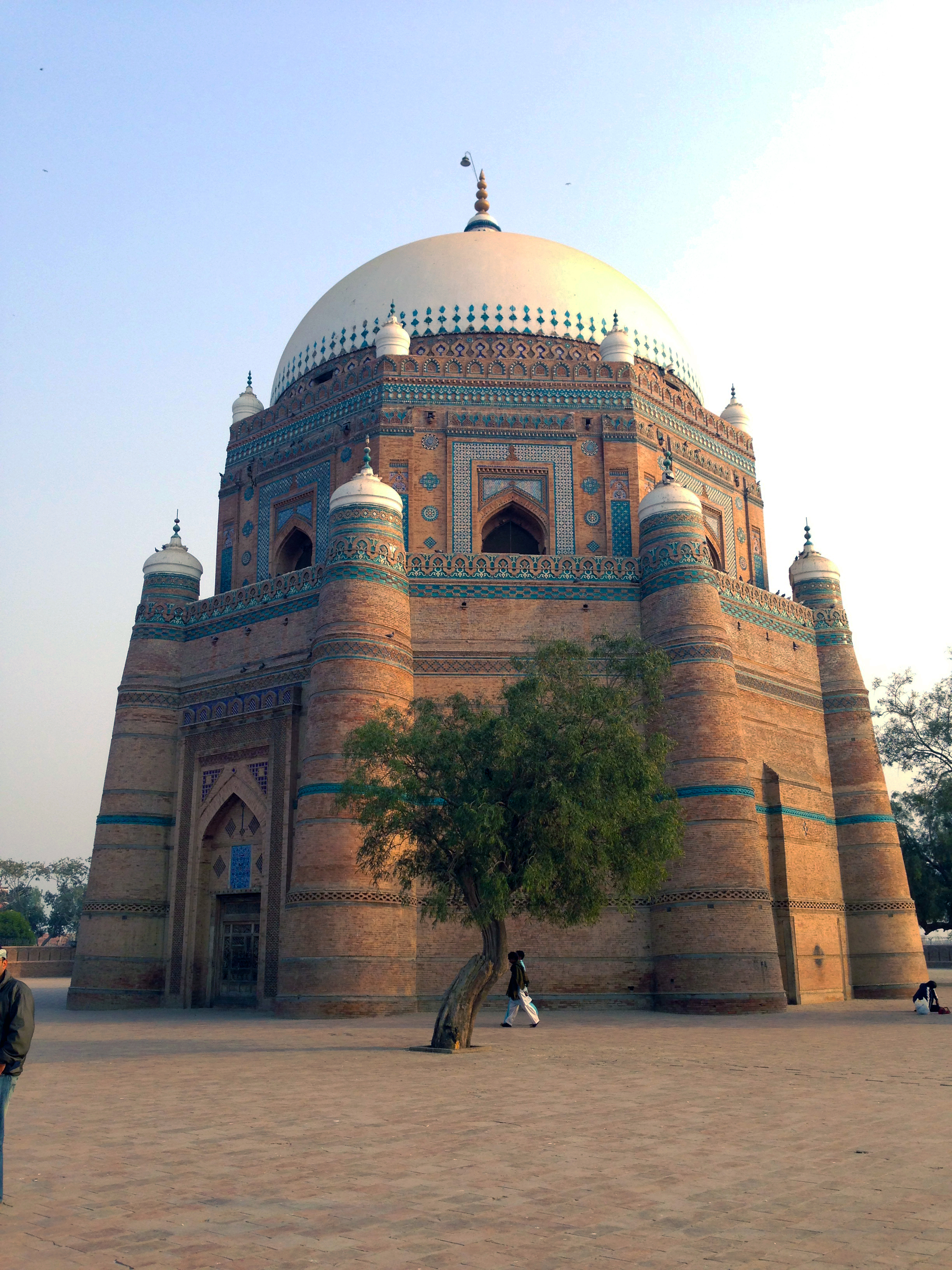
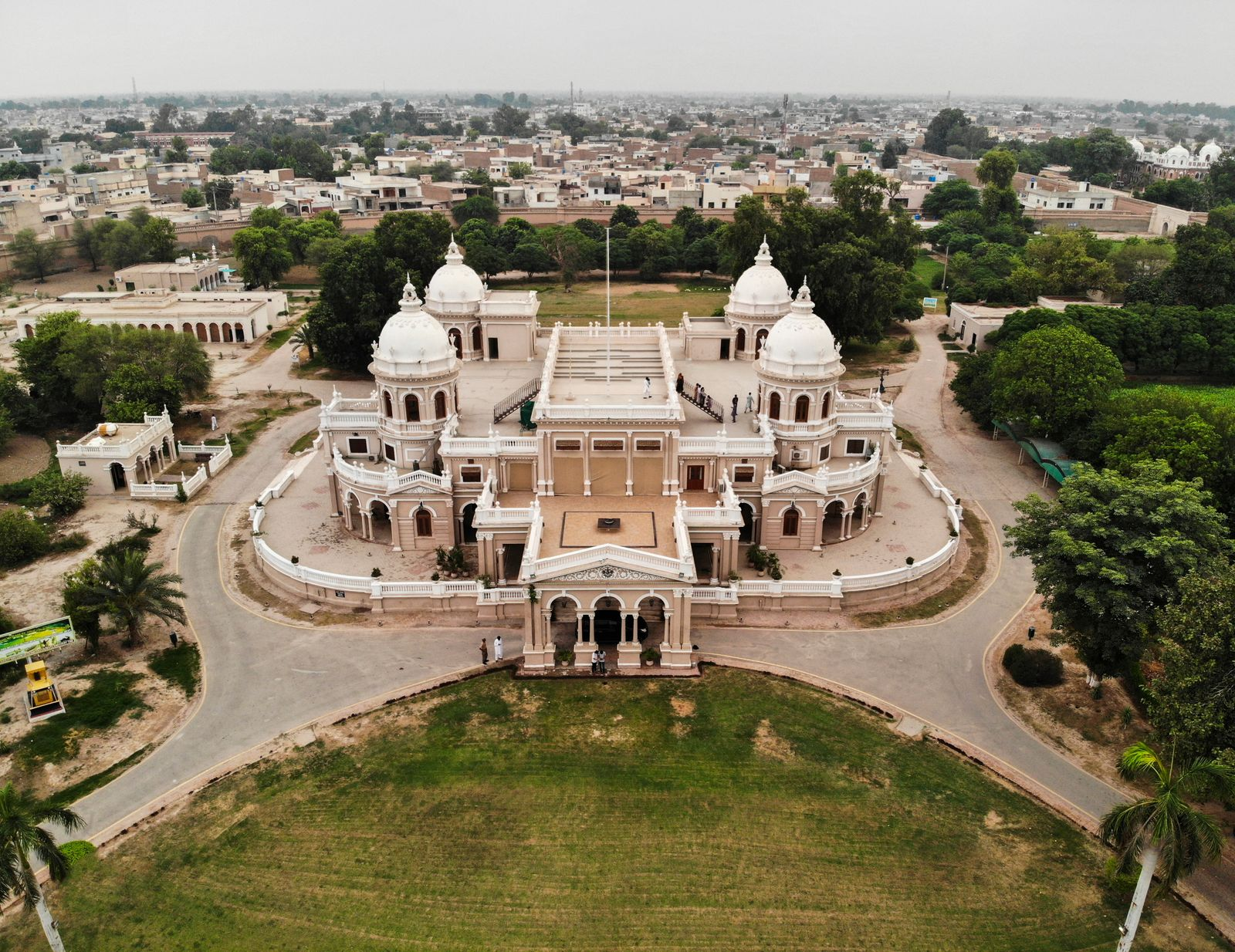
Shooting locations From left to right, Tomb of Shah Rukn-e-Alam as a minor notable location and Gulzar Mahal set as the Pivotal shooting location.

Principal photography began in late 2019 and continued for almost a year and a half. The shooting takes place at several locations, beginning at Lahore which was shown as Fadi's house. Railway stations and Haveli were shot at Bahawalpur railway station and Gulzar Mahal respectively. Shooting is also extensively done in Karachi. A notable location from the sequences of Multan includes the Tomb of Shah Rukn-e-Alam.

== Reception ==
In a review by The Friday Times, the reviewer panned the portrayal of obsessive lover and toxic and dangerous messaging of the series. In a retrospective review by Afreen Seher of the DAWN Images, she wrote "There is no divinity in the depiction of love in the magnificently shot season three of the Khuda Aur Mohabbat series. It has merely resulted in an endorsement of a stalker syndrome, justified with religious and mystic overtones."

== Awards and nominations ==
| Date of ceremony | Award | Category | Recipient(s) and nominee(s) | Result | Ref. |
|---|---|---|---|---|---|
| November 25, 2022 | Lux Style Awards | Best Television Play | Khuda Aur Muhabbat 3 | Nominated | |
| November 25, 2022 | Lux Style Awards | Best TV Actor - Viewers' Choice | Feroze Khan | Won | |
| November 25, 2022 | Lux Style Awards | Best TV Track | Sung by: Rahat Fateh Ali Khan & Nish Asher; Composed by: Naveed Nashad | Won | |
