= Visaal =

- Genre: Drama; Obsessive Love; Tragedy
- Written by: Hashim Nadeem
- Directed by: Ali Hassan
- Starring: Zahid Ahmed; Hania Aamir; Saboor Ali
- Country of origin: Pakistan
- Original language: Urdu
- No. of episodes: 27

Production
- Producer: Fahad Mustafa
- Production company: Big Bang Entertainment

Original release
- Network: ARY Digital
- Release: 28 March – 22 September 2018

Visaal is a 2018 Urdu-language Pakistani television series that premiered on 28 March and aired every Wednesday on ARY Digital. It is written by Hashim Nadeem and directed by Ali Hassan. Zahid Ahmed and Hania Aamir play the lead characters, along with Saboor Aly. Along with Khasara and Bayardi, it was one of the most popular ARY digital dramas of 2018.

== Plot ==
Akram, a street boy who reinvents himself as a religious devotee in Karachi, sees Pari at the home of Maulvi Sahab and falls in love at first sight. Taimoor, a young station officer visits Pari's home one day and he also falls in love with her. Naheed - Pari's best friend, gets jealous of her good fortune as she likes Taimoor and ruins her reputation. Mistakenly Akram marries Naheed while believing he is engaged to her friend Pari. When Pari’s father dies, Akram supports her, yet his obsession grows. Naheed eventually poisons herself and Akram; she dies, leaving behind a confession letter, while Akram survives and continues to pursue Pari.

Pari, determined to hurt Akram, becomes engaged to his servant Munna, though her old admirer Taimoor returns. Munna sacrifices his love and reunites Pari with Taimoor, while Akram’s desperation turns violent. At Pari’s wedding, Akram begs for her love but is shot dead by Munna, ending his obsession. One month later, Pari and Taimoor are shown as a happily married couple, closing the chapter on Akram’s destructive pursuit.

== Cast ==
=== Main ===
- Zahid Ahmed as Akram "Akku": good at heart, but his obsession with Pari makes him go to any length to have her
- Hania Aamir as Pari Shabeer: Shabeer's daughter; Akram's love interest
- Saboor Aly as Naheed Ghufran: Pari's childhood friend; Akram's wife

=== Recurring ===
- Ismat Zaidi as Jumman Bua: Pari's babysitter
- Tauqeer Nasir as Shabeer: Pari's father
- Agha Mustafa Hassan as Taimoor: Shabeer's boss; a young officer who falls in love with Pari
- Firdous Jamal as Maulvi Ghufran: Naheed's father
- Tahira Imam as Maulviyani ji: Naheed's mother
- Saife Hassan as Dilbar: Akku's fake brother, Azam
- Waleed Zaidi as Dhoodhpatti: Akram's best friend; Dhoodhpatti was a thief, but Akram gives him a job at his cosmetics shop
- Nazar ul Hassan as Tariq "Munna": A poor man who, despite his bachelor's degree, is unable to find a job, so Akram supports him and gives him a job at his cosmetics shop.

== Awards and nominations ==
Year	Award	Category	Recipient(s)	Result	Ref.
2019	ARY Digital- Social Media Drama Awards 2018	Best Negative Actor (Male)	Zahid Ahmed	Nominated	
2019	ARY Digital- Social Media Drama Awards 2018	Best OST	Visaal	Nominated	
2019	ARY Digital- Social Media Drama Awards 2018	Best Script Writer	Hashim Nadeem	Nominated	
