= Khaani =

2017 Pakistani television series

- Title screen of the drama
- Genre: Tragedy; Drama; Love story
- Written by: Asma Nabeel
- Directed by: Anjum Shahzad
- Starring: Sana Javed; Feroze Khan
- Theme music composer: Sahir Ali Bagga
- Opening theme: "Kaisa Yeh Marz Hai Ishq Ishq" by RFAK
- Country of origin: Pakistan
- Original language: Urdu
- No. of seasons: 1
- No. of episodes: 31

Production
- Producers: Abdullah Kadwani; Asad Qureshi
- Camera setup: Multi-camera setup
- Running time: 30–45 minutes
- Production company: 7th Sky Entertainment

Original release
- Network: Geo Entertainment
- Release: 6 November 2017 – 2 July 2018

Khaani (Urdu: خانی, feminine version of Khan) is a 2017 Pakistani drama television series that premiered on 6 November 2017 on Geo Entertainment. It is directed by Anjum Shahzad, produced by Abdullah Kadwani and Asad Qureshi under 7th Sky Entertainment, and written by Asma Nabeel. It stars Feroze Khan as Mir Hadi and Sana Javed as Sanam Ali Khan.

The series was inspired by the real-life murder of Shahzeb Khan, in Karachi in 2012.

== Plot ==
The story opens with Sanam Khan (Sana Javed), nicknamed Khaani. She is timid and cowardly, unlike Khan, and her family, who are busy preparing for Khaani and her twin brother Sarim's upcoming birthday. Meanwhile, Sarim is about to graduate when he angers the rich, spoiled son of a politician named Mir Hadi (Feroze Khan). A fight ensues, and Sarim is shot by Hadi four times and killed instantly.

Devastated over the murder of Sarim, Khaani's family files a court case against Hadi. They begin receiving threats and face a lot of humiliation and harassment. However, Khaani, who has matured and grown a backbone since her brother's death, is steadfast even when her parents waver in the situation. She goes to meet Hadi in jail and warns him that he will be stuck in this jail forever. A few hours later, Khaani reaches her home, only to find Hadi there, free! He points a gun at her forehead, and with the fear of getting her shot, Khaani's mother agrees to sign the maafinama (papers in which he has claimed to forgive Hadi and happily take the case back). Khaani curses him, saying that he'll suffer immensely despite being free. He leaves and later thinks about how he literally placed the loaded gun on her forehead, but she didn't even shiver a slightest bit. Seeing this courage, Hadi is surprised and gradually gets infatuated and obsessed with her. He stalks her, one time to the grave of Sarim, where she poured her heart, and Hadi, hiding in the back, feels sympathy towards her. He also sends her gifts, which she burns. Seeing that she isn't willing to accept him, he sends her love letters without revealing his identity. Khaani starts to like her mysterious admirer, but when she realizes that the"H” mentioned in the letters is really Hadi, she lets go of her feelings.

Hadi's parents are extremely against his unrelenting interest in Khaani and plan an 'accident' to kill her. Khaani ends up in the hospital, and when Hadi learns it was planned by his father, he confronts him and openly declares his love for Khaani, threatening to take his own life if she dies. Khaani survives with just minor injuries, and Hadi is then determined to marry her. He tries to persuade her, but is unsuccessful. Seeing their son's marriage to Khaani as an opportunity to gain a favorable impression and votes in the upcoming election, Hadi's parents agree to help him get Khaani but ask him to be patient while they convince her parents. However, Hadi grows impatient and forcefully betrothes her to himself when his father is away on a business trip. This leads to Khaani and her family deciding to escape during the night and go into hiding. Hadi obsessively tries to search for her, and his relationship with his father worsens when he refuses to help Hadi find Khaani with his resources.

Meanwhile, Khaani gets a well-paid job in an office and makes fast friends with her boss's great-granddaughter, Raima, who misses her late mother. Arham, Raima's father and the boss's grandson, starts to fall for Khaani and confesses his love to her, which she refuses because she hasn't recovered emotionally from the scars left by Mir Hadi. Eventually, she gives in to her feelings and accepts Arham's proposal.

Hadi learns from his best friend, Ali, of Khaani's location and defies his parents' wish by setting out to find her. To his shock and hurt, he arrives at her home just in time to see her in her bridal gown, preparing for her wedding. He kidnaps her and leaves a letter in her room in which he states that he has Khaani away with him.Khaani's mother reads this later and is devastated. Meanwhile, Hadi takes her and asks her why she never fears him. She badly insults him and tells him that she can never love him. Resigned, he returns her home and leaves in a dejected and depressed manner. Khaani's family keeps her kidnapping secret from the groom's family and proceeds to take her to the wedding hall.

Hadi is overcome by the true essence of love and starts seeking the meaning behind his feelings. Meanwhile, Khaani is happily married and living with Arham's family. However, Arham's family is informed by Hadi's mother, who wants revenge, about Khaani's kidnapping and her family's lies about the past and her brother's cause of death, calling her virtue and character into question, thus resulting in her humiliation. She abruptly leaves the house without informing anyone, and Arham feels lonely in her absence. He decides to bring her back, even though his mother is against it.

Hadi, in contrast, is achieving high levels of love and spirituality. Despite his friend and family's requests, he decides to make a Sufi shrine his humble abode and stays there from then on, finding that his old home reminds him too much of all his guilty acts and regrets. He also starts experiencing spiritual visions in the form of a woman during his stay at the shrine. This spirit assists him in recognizing true love. Hadi questions the spirit about how to achieve the ultimate love, to which she replies that it is a lifelong, never-ending process.

After returning to her husband Arham's home, both Khaani and Arham decide to reopen Khaani's brother Sarim's murder case file in an attempt to prosecute Mir Shah (Mehmood Aslam), Hadi's father, and Hadi himself, who shot Sarim.

Unaware that Hadi is a completely changed man now, who only wants to spread love and practice spirituality, both Arham and Khaani persist on with the case reopening. Hadi's father tries many ways to stop his son from being punished but fails each time. Hadi himself declares he is guilty and the court gives him the death penalty. Mir Shah is afraid to face the world and commits suicide, whereas Hadi is given a last wish, to which he says he wishes to meet Khaani. Hadi's mother begs Khaani's mother to save her son from death, so Khaani's parents in turn request Khaani to forgive Hadi. Khaani is first reluctant but then decides to forgive Hadi. She visits him a few minutes before his execution and tells him that he does not need to die as she has forgiven him. Hadi begs Khaani to let him die, but she leaves, telling him that death will be his easy way out and living will be the hard way. In the ending, Hadi is shown teaching other prisoners love and how to practice spiritually. The show ends with Hadi saying 'This is not my doing but it is all thanks to God.'

== Cast ==
=== Main ===
- Feroze Khan as Mir Hadi
- Sana Javed as Sanam Ali Khan “Khaani”

=== Recurring ===
- Mehmood Aslam as Mir Shah – Hadi's father
- Saman Ansari as Sitara Shah – Hadi's mother
- Malik Emad as Ali as Hadi's fiercely loyal best friend
- Shehzad Mukhtar as Mitthal – Mir Shah's right-hand man
- Salma Hassan as Sonia Salman Ali Khan – Sanam's mother
- Rashid Farooqui as Salman Ali Khan – Sanam's father
- Rimha Ahmed as Sana Ali Khan – Sanam's sister
- Shehzeen Rahat as Sara Ali Khan – Sanam's sister
- Muhammad Mubarik Ali as Arham – Sanam's Husband
- Qavi Khan as Hamid Malik – Arham's grandfather
- Seemi Pasha as Iffat – Arham's mother
- Khushi Maheen as Raima – Arham's daughter

=== Cameo ===
- Ali Ansari as Sarim Ali Khan (Dead)
- Qazi Wajid as Judge
- Zia Gurchani as Khaani's lawyer against Mir Hadi

== Interruption ==
Khaani was on hiatus beginning on 2 April 2018 due to the ban of Geo Entertainment Network, but the broadcast resumed again on 23 April 2018.

== Soundtrack ==
Khaani OST

Soundtrack album by Rahat Fateh Ali Khan
- Released: 26 October 2017
- Recorded: 2017
- Genre: Television soundtrack
- Length: (5:11)
- Language: Urdu
- Label: Geo Entertainment

Music video
- "Khaani" OST on YouTube

The OST was sung by Rahat Fateh Ali Khan. It has gained more than 100 million views on YouTube.

== International broadcast ==
Due to its immense popularity serial is broadcast by MBC Bollywood in Middle East in 2019 under the same title and is also available on Sahid.net in Arabic. The show was also aired in Somaliland on Horn Cable Television Network under the same title in 2019.

=== Netflix ===
Later in mid 2019, the series was also released on Netflix due to its immense popularity.

== Reception ==
The serial created new records of popularity soon after its inception and became viral especially on social media. Khaani's OST has been appreciated with millions of views. Moreover, the episodes uploaded on the official channel page on YouTube has garnered millions of views and trended on the top 3 positions. Khaani won over audience nationally and internationally. IMDb gave 8.1 out of 10, according to the TRP charts Khaani first episode gained 4.8 TRP ratings. Its second episode gained 4.1 TRP. Its third episode received 4.9 TRP ratings. Its fourth episode received 5.1 TRP ratings. Khaani's fifth episode gained 4.7 TRP ratings. Its sixth episode received 5.4 TRP ratings and seventh episode with 6.82 TRP and eighth episode got 7.4 TRP. The 9th episode of Khaani on the first day of new year got 8.2. On its 11th episode it got 8.9 TRPs and a peak rating of 10.1 leaving behind Hum TV's serial Alif Allah Aur Insaan (TV series). This was the highest rating for any drama serial at that point. Its 12th episode received rating with 9.1 TRPs. On its 13th episode got 8.3 TRPs. Khaani's 14th episode peak rating was 7.1 TRPs. Its 15th episode received rating with 9.0 TRPs. its 17th episode received 7.4 TRPs. Khaani 18th episode got 8.0 TRPs and until highest rating with 10.00 TRPs on its 20th episode. The second last episode of the serial got more than 5 million views on YouTube and gain 8.9 TRP ratings, and the last episode of the serial had 10.1 TRP.

Before the telecast of last episode, a campaign was started by Geo Entertainment about the end of Mir Haadi's story and was largely appreciated by the Khaani viewers.

=== Accolades and nominations ===
Date of ceremony	Award	Category	Recipient(s) and nominee(s)	Result
7 July 2019	18th Lux Style Awards	Best TV Play	Khaani	Nominated
7 July 2019	18th Lux Style Awards	Best TV Play Director	Anjum Shahzad	Nominated
7 July 2019	18th Lux Style Awards	Best TV Writer	Asma Nabeel	Nominated
7 July 2019	18th Lux Style Awards	Best TV Actor - Viewer's choice	Feroze Khan	Won
7 July 2019	18th Lux Style Awards	Best TV Actor - Critic's's choice	Feroze Khan	Nominated
7 July 2019	18th Lux Style Awards	Best TV Actress- Viewer's choice	Sana Javed	Nominated
7 July 2019	18th Lux Style Awards	Best TV Actress- Critic's choice	Sana Javed	Nominated
7 July 2019	18th Lux Style Awards	Best Original Sound Track	Rahat Fateh Ali Khan	Won
7 December 2019	IPPA Awards 2019	Best On-screen TV couple serial	Feroze Khan and Sana Javed	Nominated
7 December 2019	IPPA Awards 2019	Best TV serial Popular	Khaani	Nominated
7 December 2019	IPPA Awards 2019	Best Director TV serial	Anjum Shahzad	Nominated
7 December 2019	IPPA Awards 2019	Best Actor TV serial	Feroze Khan	Nominated
7 December 2019	IPPA Awards 2019	Best Actress TV serial	Sana Javed	Nominated
7 December 2019	IPPA Awards 2019	Best Supporting Role Serial	Mehmood Aslam	Nominated
