= Firdous Jamal =

Pakistani actor (born 1954)

- فردوس جمال
- Born: Firdous Khan; 9 June 1954 (age 72); Peshawar, North West Frontier Province, Pakistan (now Khyber Pakhtunkhwa, Pakistan)
- Occupation: Actor
- Notable work: Waris, Sayeeban Sheeshay ka, Man chale ka sauda, Mehboob, Pagal Ahmeq Bewakoof, Saahil, Piyari, Dhoop Deewar, Ruswaiyan
- Family: Hamza Firdous (son); Bilawal Firdous (son)
- Awards: Pride of Performance Award by the President of Pakistan in 1986

Firdous Jamal (Urdu: فردوس جمال; born 9 June 1954) is a Pakistani television, theatre, stage and film actor.

== Early life and education ==
Firdous Jamal was born as Firdous Khan to Baz Muhammad Khan, a businessman, in Peshawar on 9 June 1954, and after earning his BA from Islamia College he tried to begin his artistic career as a singer before switching to acting.

== Career ==
Having launched his acting career with a Hindko drama serial called Badnami Dey Toway in the mid-1970s, he has since then acted in at least 300 TV plays, 150 stage plays, 200 radio plays and 50 films, with his work consisting in all the major languages of Pakistan.

== Personal life ==
=== Family ===
His son Hamza Firdous is an actor, an "award winning web drama producer and actor in Ireland" who has had roles in dramas like O Rangreza and Ghughi, while another son, Bilawal Firdous, whose professional name is Bazil Firdous, is a model and aspiring actor, with whom he opened his own production house, Firdous Jamal Films.

=== Health issues ===
He was diagnosed with colon cancer in December 2022 and as of May 2024 is going through remission.

== Selected filmography ==
=== Films ===
Year	Title	Role
1980	Choron Da Shehenshah	
1980	Rishtaa	
1981	Muftbar	Yousuf
1981	Alladin	
1983	Badltey Rishtey	
1984	Muqaddar Ka Sikandar	Lawyer
1984	Doorian	
1984	Jat Kamala Gaya Dubai	
1984	Naseebon Wali	
1984	Yeh Kaisay Huwa	
1985	Direct Hawaldar	
1986	Jahez	
1987	Silsila	
1988	Roti	
1990	Maa Qasam	
1992	Abida	
1992	Nargis	
1993	Chandi	
1993	Heena	
1993	Kunwara Baap	
2016	Revenge of the Worthless	Sufi Mohammed
2016	Saya e Khuda e Zuljalal	Rasheed

=== Television serials ===
Year	Title	Role	Channel
1979	Waris	Anwar	PTV
1981	Dehleez	Jamal	PTV
1981	Kaanch Ka Pul	Yusaf	PTV
1982	Dhoop Dewar	Salman	PTV
1985	Andhera Ujala	Arif	PTV
1986	Hazaron Raaste	Adil Murad	PTV
1989	Kiran	Faraz	PTV
1992	Nashaib	Ayaz	PTV
1992	Mann Chalay Ka Sauda	Different roles.	PTV
1993	Khuwahish	Anwar	PTV
1994	Daldal	Saeed Kamal	PTV
1995	Red Card	Ahmed Hassan Kamal	STN
2000	Anna	Nawab Shahpur Ahmed Khan	PTV
2000	Zamana		PTV
2000	Kanch Ke Par	Sajid	PTV
2000	Inkar	Anti-Narcotics Force Officer	PTV
2001	Hawa Pe Raqs	Malik	PTV
2002	Landa Bazar	Hayat	PTV
2002	Nigah	Jalal Khan	PTV
2004	Saiban Sheeshay Ka	Akhtar Awan	PTV
2006	Khawab Nagar	Raheem Bakhsh	PTV
2006	Kaanch Ke Jugnu		ATV
2007	Sill	Amir Baig	ATV
2008	Mehndi Waley haath	Chaudhry	Geo TV
2011	Pani Jaisa Piyar	Adarsh's father	Hum TV
2011	Khalida Ki Walida	Karamat	PTV Home
2012	Koi Meray Dil Sey Pouchay		PTV Home
2013	Dheeray Say		A-Plus TV
2013	Kamal-e-Sabt		A-Plus TV
2013	Pyarey Afzal	Maulvi Subhanullah	ARY Digital
2015–16	Aangan Mein Deewar	Chaudhry Noor Alam	PTV Home
2016	Khuda Aur Muhabbat	Amjad Raza	Geo TV
2016	Mera Yaar Miladay	Master Ji	ARY Digital
2017	Zindagi Mujhey Tera Pata Chahiye		PTV Home
2017	Gustakh Ishq	Abdul Quddus	Urdu 1
2018	Visaal	Maulvi Ghufran	ARY Digital
2018	Romeo Weds Heer	Hakeem Luqman	Geo TV
2018	Ishq Na Kariyo Koi	Fariha's father (fashion designer)	Express TV
2019	Hania	Fareed	ARY Digital
2019	Gul-o-Gulzar	Iqbal	ARY Digital
2019	Zid		Express TV
2019	Rani Nokrani		Express TV
2019	Wafa Lazim To Nahi	Shaukat (Sarah and Mani's father)	TV One
2019–20	Janbaaz		Express TV
2023–24	Aik Mohabbat ki Kahani	portrayed Alizey Shah's father	Express TV

== Awards ==
- Pride of Performance Award by the President of Pakistan in 1986.

Ceremony	Category	Project	Result
4th Lux Style Awards	Best TV Actor (Satellite)	Woh Tees Din	Nominated
14th Lux Style Awards	Best TV Actor	Pyarey Afzal	Nominated
