= Sadia Jabbar =

Pakistani television and film producer

Sadia Jabbar Qasim is a Pakistani television and film producer. She founded Sadia Jabbar Production in 2014, to produce television serials for private channels in Pakistan.

== Career ==
In 2016, Qasim produced her first feature film Balu Mahi. Some of her work includes Mera Naam Yousuf Hai (2015), Takkabur (2015), Farwa Ki ABC (2016), Ghamand (2018), Khafa Khafa Zindagi (2018) and Mere Bewafa (2018).

== Television ==
=== Productions ===
| Year | Serial | Network | Cast | Episodes | Ref(s) |
|---|---|---|---|---|---|
| 2015 | Mera Naam Yousuf Hai | A-Plus TV | Maya Ali, Osman Khalid Butt | 20 | |
| 2015 | Farwa Ki ABC | A-Plus TV | Sonya Hussain, Khalid Anam, Irsa Ghazal | 26 | |
| 2015 | Yeh Mera Deewanapan Hai | A-Plus TV | Saima Noor, Junaid Khan, Irsa Ghazal, Javed Sheikh, Anoushey Abbasi | 48 | |
| 2015 | Khuda Dekh Raha Hai | A-Plus TV | Sajal Aly, Agha Ali | 20 | |
| 2015 | Takkabur | A-Plus TV | Fatima Effendi, Alyy Khan | 23 | |
| 2018 | Ghamand | A-Plus TV | Sunita Marshall, Noman Ijaz, Minal Khan | 25 | |
| 2018 | Mere Bewafa | A-Plus TV | Sarah Khan, Agha Ali, Zhalay Sarhadi | 24 | |
| 2018 | Khafa Khafa Zindagi | A-Plus TV | Sumbul Iqbal, Ali Safina | 24 | |
| 2019 | Dil-e-Bereham | A-Plus TV | Amar Khan, Wahaj Ali, Mariyam Nafees | 16 | |
| 2019 | Shameless Proposals | YouTube | Various | 7 | |
| 2019 | Mujhe Beta Chahiye | A-Plus TV | Sabreen Hisbani, Alyy Khan | 26 | |

== Personal life ==
She married Pakistani film maker Qasim Ali Mureed. She launched her on line brand Mussarat lingerie on 11 January 2025.
