= Momin Saqib =

Pakistani actor

- Born: Momin Saqib Arain; 3 November 1994 (age 31); Lahore, Punjab, Pakistan
- Education: King's College London
- Alma mater: BSC in Computer Science and Management, King's College London
- Occupations: Television actor; Film actor; Host
- Years active: 2020–present
- Relatives: Bilal Bin Saqib (brother)

Momin Saqib is a Pakistani actor. He rose to prominence with his viral video and gained on-screen mass media prominence with the portrayal of Essa Qudratullah in Hum TV's Raqs-e-Bismil, for which he received Hum Award for Best Television Sensation Male and a nomination of Best Emerging Talent at 21st Lux Style Awards.

== Early life and education ==
Born on 3 November 1994 in Lahore, Punjab he has earned his BSc Computer Science and Management Science from King’s College London. During his studies, he became the first non-European elected president of the King's College London Students' Union (KCLSU).

== Career ==
=== Television ===
In 2020, he made his acting debut with Hum TV's Be Adab which was directed by Shahzad Kashmiri. He portrayed the role of a devoted son of the characters played by Sania Saeed and Rehan Sheikh.

He then appeared in Hashim Nadeem's scripted Raqs-e-Bismil alongside Imran Ashraf, Sarah Khan, Anoushey Abbasi and Mehmood Aslam. He received praise for portraying an emotionally intense yet introvert character and a nomination of Best Emerging Talent in TV at 21st Lux Style Awards.

In 2024, he appeared in Wajahat Rauf's written and directed Tubelite as a young and ambitious graduate who is inspired by Steve Jobs and wants to do something big.

=== Film ===
In 2022, he made his cinematic debut with Ehteshamuddin's Dum Mastam alongside Imran Ashraf and Amar Khan.

=== Host ===
In 2023, he began hosting Had Kar Di, an entertainment show on Samaa TV featuring public figures as guests, including celebrities.

== Filmography ==
=== Television series ===
Year	Title	Role	Network	Notes
2020	Be Adab	Rohail	Hum TV	Acting debut
2020–21	Raqs-e-Bismil	Essa Qudratullah	Hum TV	
2024	Tubelite	Hamza	Express Entertainment	

=== Telefilm ===
Year	Title	Role	Notes
2021	Dil Ke Chor	Junaid	Telefilm

=== Film ===
Year	Title	Role	Notes
2022	Dum Mastam	Guddu Razor	
2024	Daghabaaz Dil	Moon	

=== Television shows ===
Year	Title	Role	Network
2022	Hasna Mana Hai	Guest	Geo News
2023–2024	Had Kar Di	Host	Samaa TV

== Awards and accolades ==
Year	Awards	Category	Work	Result	Ref.
2022	Hum Awards	Best Television Sensation Male	Raqs-e-Bismil	Won	
2022	Lux Style Awards	Best Emerging Talent in TV	Raqs-e-Bismil	Nominated	
