= Dum Mastam =

2022 Pakistani film by Mohammed Ehteshamuddin

- Theatrical release poster
- Urdu: دم مستم
- Directed by: Mohammed Ehteshamuddin
- Written by: Amar Khan
- Produced by: Adnan Siddiqui; Akhtar Husnain
- Starring: Imran Ashraf; Amar Khan (Full Cast)
- Cinematography: Suleman Razzak
- Music by: Various (see below)
- Production company: Cereal Entertainment
- Distributed by: Hum Films
- Release date: 3 May 2022 (Eid al-Fitr)
- Running time: 155 minutes
- Country: Pakistan
- Languages: Urdu; Punjabi
- Box office: Rs. 7 crore (US$250,000)

Dum Mastam is a 2022 Pakistani romantic comedy-drama film directed by Mohammed Ehteshamuddin, and produced by Adnan Siddiqui and Akhtar Husnain under Cereal Entertainment. Written by Amar Khan, the film stars Imran Ashraf and Amar Khan along with Sohail Ahmed, Saleem Mairaj and Momin Saqib in supporting roles. The film was released on Eid al-Fitr, 3 May 2022, by Hum Films.

== Plot ==
The film revolves around two individuals from the Walled City of Lahore. Aliya, an ambitious and full of dreams girl who craves to become a big dancer and Sikandar Hayat Khan a.k.a. Bao, Aliya's neighbour who loves her. Being neighbours, they both have good relation with each other but Aliya has never thought about it. When Bao confesses his feelings for her, she denies straighly as she wants to focus on her dream. However, Bao sends his parents to her house with his proposal where she along with her family insults them. Bao bares it and tells her that she has left from his heart as she has disrespectful his parents.

In dance class, Aliya meets with an accident and one of her legs becomes fractured due to Bao's mistake who leaves the rope of wheel, where she was sitting. It becomes impossible for her to fulfil the dream of becoming dancer with the fractured leg, so she decides to marry him. She asks Bao for marry her after which they both get marry.

== Cast ==
- Amar Khan as Aliya, Sikandar's love interest
- Imran Ashraf as Sikandar "Bao" Aliya's love interest
- Sohail Ahmed as Bao's father
- Saleem Mairaj as Arif Tootiwala
- Momin Saqib as Guddu Razor
- Adnan Shah Tipu
- Saife Hassan
- Faiza Gillani as Aliya
- Uzma Beg
- Tahira Imam
- Sikandar Nawaz Rajput as Khurram
- Agha Mustafa Hassan
- Tayyab Mahmood Sheikh

=== Cameo appearances ===
- Rahat Fateh Ali Khan as Himself
- Adnan Siddiqui as Director
- Wajahat Rauf as Voice Over Man
- Arslan Naseer as CBA (Himself)
- Taimoor Salahuddin as Mooroo
- Buraq Shabbir as Himself
- Hassan Chaudhry as Journalist
- Omair Alavi as Himself
- Maliha Rehman as Herself
- Kiran Malik as Dancer
- Ali Hayat Rizvi as Stage actor
- Nigah Jee as Choreographer

== Production ==
Adnan Siddiqui announced on 25 October 2019 that he had begun the production of his new film, titled Dum Mastam under his banner Cereal Entertainment, with an intention to release it in 2020. He further said that he did not want to star himself. Amar Khan wrote the script of the film in 2016 as her dream project when she was in her film school, and to be directed by Ehteshamuddin, she had not wished to be in lead cast in her own story, until being selected by the director. Ashraf also said that he came in for another project for a small role, before he got this role in a sudden. While both the leads have already been working in Pakistani dramas, including 2018's fame Belapur Ki Dayan and Ranjha Ranjha Kardi respectively, they are set to debut in the Pakistan film industry with this.

Filming took place in two spells respectively; 60 percent in Lahore and 40 percent in Karachi, with some mid gap in January 2020, while a music video has been shot in different locations across Pakistan. However, principal photography was paused due to the COVID-19 pandemic in Pakistan in March 2020; the last few days' shoot was then completed in October after the lockdown restrictions started lifting, followed by the post-production phase taking place till completion in July 2021.

Meme sensation Momin Saqib is also set to make his film debut. Music is done by Naveed Nashad, Shiraz Uppal, Azaan Sami khan, Bilal Saeed and Shani Arshad, with singers Ali Tariq, Neha Chaudhry, Beena Khan, Sarmad Qadeer, and Waqas Ali; while lyrics for 2 songs are by Shakeel Sohail. Cinematography is done by Suleman Razzak, while complete cast and crew was revealed on 12 July 2021.

== Soundtracks ==
Dum Mastam

Soundtrack album by various artists
- Recorded: 2019–21
- Genre: Romance film
- Language: Urdu; Punjabi
- Label: HUM; One Two

Singles from Dum Mastam
- 1. "Beqarar Dil" Released: 19 March 2022; 2. "Khudaya Vey" Released: 3 May 2022

No.	Title	Lyrics	Music	Singer(s)	Length
1.	"Larki Achari"	Shakeel Sohail	Shiraz Uppal	Shiraz Uppal, Neha Chaudhry	4:21
2.	"Tu Heer Meri" (title track)	Wasi Shah	Naveed Nashad	Nabeel Shaukat Ali & Beena Khan	4:39
3.	"Beqarar Dil"	Bilal Saeed	Bilal Saeed	Bilal Saeed	3:00
4.	"Ik Vari Sun Le"	Azaan Sami khan, Shakeel Sohail	Azaan Sami khan	Azaan Sami khan	4:37
5.	"Lakhan Vichon Dou"	Bilal Saeed, Young Desi	Bilal Saeed	Sarmad Qadeer, Young Desi	3:32
6.	"Khudaya Vey"	Bilal Saeed	Bilal Saeed	Bilal Saeed, Momina Mustehsan	4:39
7.	"Kash Aisa Ho"	Bilal Saeed	Bilal Saeed	Bilal Saeed	3:59

== Release ==
First poster was revealed on 5 July 2021 at 5th Hum Awards, signing Hum Films in. After delays, release date of Eid al-Fitr, in May 2022, was finalized after cinemas re-started in Pakistan, and film trailer was released in a trailer launch hosted by Sanam Jung at Pearl-Continental Hotels & Resorts, Karachi, on 24 February. It had a world television premiere on Eid al-Adha, 10 July 2022, on Hum TV.

== Reception ==
=== Critical response ===
The film received mixed to negative reviews from critics towards its storyline, screenplay and performances.

== Accolades ==
Year	Awards	Category	Recipient/ nominee	Result	Ref.
October 6, 2023	Lux Style Awards	Best Film (Critics' choice)	Dum Mastam	Nominated	
October 6, 2023	Lux Style Awards	Best Film Actor	Imran Ashraf	Nominated	
