= Navid Shahzad =

Pakistani actress

- Born: Navid Rahman; 15 August 1956 (age 69); Lahore, Punjab, Pakistan
- Other names: Naveed Shahzad
- Education: Government College, Lahore
- Occupations: Actress; Writer; Educationist
- Years active: 1972–present
- Spouse: Shahzad Humayun
- Children: 3 including Farhad Humayun
- Parent: S. A. Rahman (father)
- Relatives: Rashed Rahman (brother)
- Awards: Pride of Performance (2004)

Navid Shahzad (née Rahman) is a Pakistani actress, writer and educationist. She started her career as an actor in the 1970s and has appeared in a number of television series since then. Navid was a popular and successful actress of the 1970s. She made her film debut with a supporting role in Nadeem Baig's Punjab Nahi Jaungi. She became an author when her first book, Aslan's Roar, was published in 2019. Shahzad is the recipient of the president's Pride of Performance, the highest literary award of Pakistan.

== Early life ==
Shahzad was born and raised in Lahore, Punjab, Pakistan. Her father S. A. Rahman was a judge at the Supreme Court of Pakistan and later served as the 5th chief justice of Pakistan.

She completed her studies from Government College, Lahore. Navid was the only daughter and youngest among her three brothers including Shahid Rahman a lawyer, Asad Rahman a human rights activist and Rashed Rahman a writer for Dawn Newspaper. Navid's mother was a philanthropist who ran Mayo Hospital's famous convalescent home, which was established in 1948, along with Begum Shahabuddin.

== Career ==
=== Acting career ===
Shahzad began her career with Shoaib Hashmi's political satire Such Gup, which ran for three years on PTV. Following the success of the series, she appeared in Hashmi's next show Taal Matol, which had same format as of his previous satire. She played a manipulative feudal matriarch in Nusrat Thakur's Ghulam Gardish, which ran on PTV in 1999.

In 2016, she also appeared in Sabiha Sumar's Chotay Shah, which was made to aimed at Zeal Film Unity Festival. In 2017, she made her feature film debut with Nadeem Baig's Punjab Nahi Jaungi. In 2021, she appeared as a selfish head of a brothel in Kashif Nisar's directorial Dil Na Umeed To Nahi.

=== Bibliography ===
Shahzad became an author and writer with her novel Aslan's Roar, which was published in August 2019. The fictional novel deals with the Turkish culture and Muslim heroes.

=== As an educationist ===
Shahzad served as the dean of house of liberal in Beaconhouse National University, where she set up the first theater, film and television department of the country. She is currently serving as the academic advisior of Lahore Grammar School.

== Personal life ==
She married Shahzad Humayun during her study at Government College, Lahore. Humayun died few years after their marriage, leaving three children behind. One of Shahzad's son Farhad Humayun was a musician, who died in 2021.

== Filmography ==
=== Television series ===
Year	Title	Role	Notes
1973	Such Gup	Various	PTV
1974	Flora Aur Farida	Flora	PTV
1975	Taal Matol	Various	PTV
1983	Dour-e-Junoon	Zainab	PTV
1999	Ghulam Gardish	Nudrat Bano	PTV
2006	Chashman	Mah Gul	PTV
2016	Mazaaq Raat	Herself	Dunya News
2018	Pukaar	Laali Maa	ARY Digital
2021	Dil Na Umeed To Nahi	Suraiya Anjum "Aunty"	A-Plus

=== Film ===
Year	Title	Role	Notes
2013	65	Nurse	short-film
2016	Chotay Shah	Lady Sultan Hussain Shah	short-film
2017	Punjab Nahi Jaungi	Bebo Ji "Nikatara"	film debut
2025	Neelofar	Dadi	
TBA	Aan	TBA	filming; directed by Haseeb Hassan

== Awards and honours ==
Year	Award	Category	Result	Title	Ref.
1984	4th PTV Awards	Best Actress	Nominated	Daur-e-Junoon	
2004	Pride of Performance	Award by the President of Pakistan	Won	Arts	
