= Cereal Productions =

Pakistani television and film production company

Cereal Entertainment Company
- Company type: Public company
- Genre: Entertainment
- Founded: 2016; 10 years ago
- Founder: Adnan Siddiqui
- Headquarters: Karachi, Sindh, Pakistan
- Key people: Adnan Siddiqui (MD); Akhtar Hasnain (Managing Director)
- Products: Television series Movie production

Cereal Productions is a Pakistani television and film production company which has produced several television series since 2016. It is founded by Adnan Siddiqui and Akhtar Hasnain. The production house will release its first feature film, Dum Mastam in May 2022.

== Former Productions ==
=== Film ===
- Dum Mastam

=== Television ===
Year	Title	Genre	Episodes	Notes
2016–17	Seeta Bagri	Drama	31	
2017	Pujaran	Drama	37	
2017	Jalti Barish	Soap	71	
2017	Aadat	Drama	32	
2018	Ghughi	Drama	29	
2018	Saiyaan Way	Soap	87	
2019–20	Mein Na Janoo	Drama	37	co-produced with MD Productions
2020	Ghamandi	Drama	29	

== Accolades ==
- Lux Style Awards - Best Original Soundtrack - Ghughi by Beena Khan and Naveed Nashad - Nominated
