= Amar Khan =

Pakistani director, screenwriter and actor

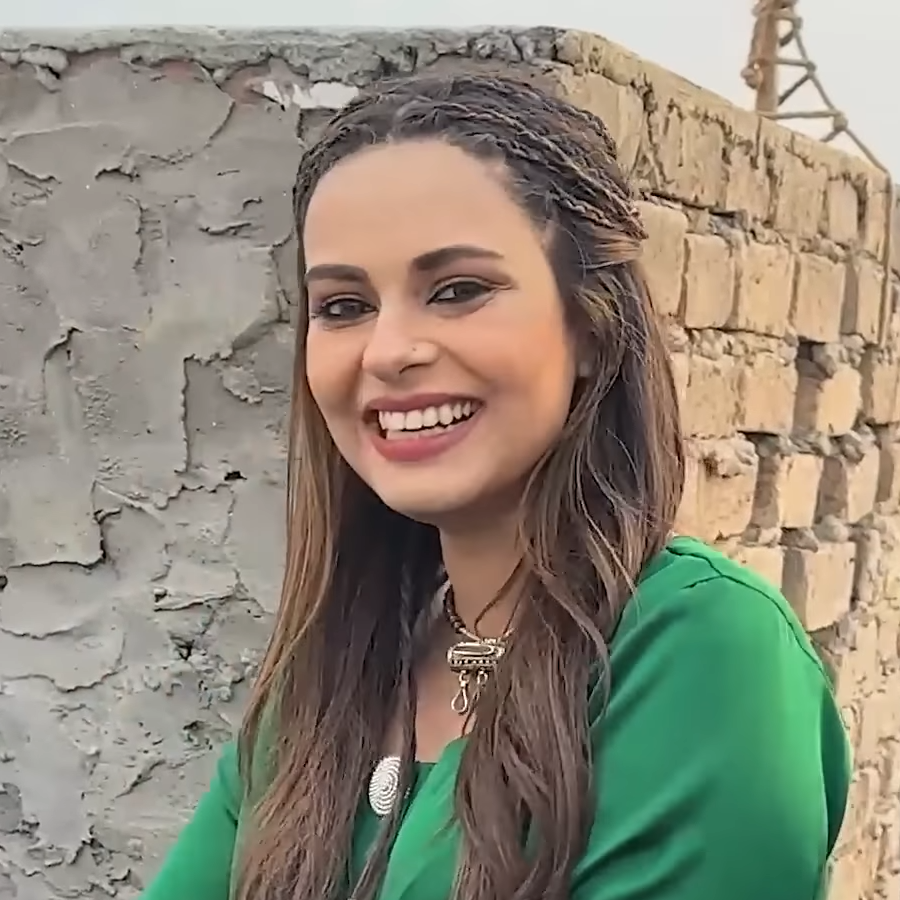
- Khan in 2023
- Born: Lahore, Punjab, Pakistan
- Education: Beaconhouse National University
- Occupations: Director, writer, television actress
- Years active: 2014–present
- Parent: Fareeha Jabeen (mother)

Amar Khan (Urdu: امر خان) is a Pakistani television actress, director and writer. She played Neelofur the witch in the 2018 supernatural series Belapur Ki Dayan. She further appeared in a leading roles in Ghughi, Dil-e-Bereham, Choti Choti Batain and as antagonist in Dil-e-Gumshuda. She received critical acclaim for her portrayal of Heer in Heer Da Hero, Irha in Daraar, Samra in Qayamat, Abeer in Baddua, Mishaal in Breaking News and Zareena in Mitti De Baway.

== Life and career ==
Amar Khan was born in Lahore, Punjab. She is the daughter of actress Fareeha Jabeen. She has graduated as a filmmaker from Beaconhouse National University, Lahore. While studying, Khan ventured into making short films.

Khan made her acting debut with 2017 short film Chashm-e-Num. In a 2018 super-natural horror series Belapur Ki Dayan, she plays Neelofur, a witch spirit who returns from the afterlife to seek revenge on those who caused her death. The serial ran for 20 episodes and aired weekly. She worked alongside Adnan Siddiqui, Sarah Khan and Irfan Khoosat in the series. The serial also earned her nomination for Best Emerging Talent at Lux Style Awards.

She later appeared in TV One's Ghughi in which she played a Hindu girl who falls in love with a Muslim boy played by Adnan Siddiqui. Maria Shirazi of The News International wrote, “In a short span of time, Khan has proved her versatility”. In the same year, she made episodic appearance in anthology drama Ustani Jee. She later appeared as Ayeza in Sadia Jabbar's Dil-e-Bereham opposite Wahaj Ali. Her other appearances include Zeena (women with an inferiority complex) in Angeline Malik's miniseries Choti Choti Batain and Abdullah Kadwani's Dil-e-Gumshuda as antagonist. Her performance as Alizeh is noted by the critics. Reviewer from Daily Times wrote, "Amar imbues the role of Alizey with a certain earnestness that was required to bring her to life". In 2023, Khan received critical acclaim for her riveting performance in Kashif Nisar's directorial Breaking News. Her other acclaim roles are Irha in Daraar, Samra in Qayamat and as Abeer in Baddua. As per Eastern Eye, Khan has a strong performance in these dramas.

=== As a writer ===
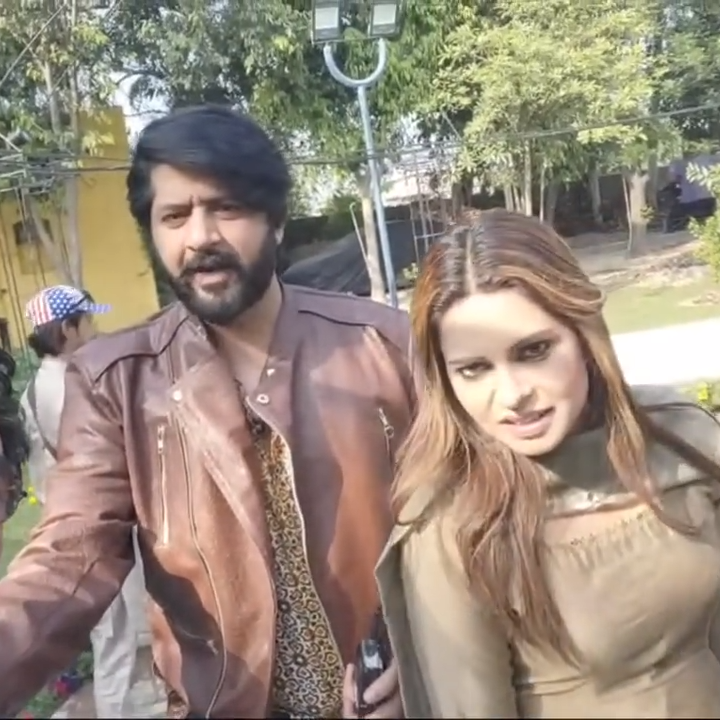
Khan with Imran Ashraf, behind-the-scenes of a shoot in 2023

As a writer, Khan wrote several critical acclaim projects including Akkad Bakkad, Dard-e-Dil, Azaad Masi, Chashm-e-Num, Black Wednesday, of which Black Wednesday earned her Best Film Award in Peace Category at 60 seconds International film Awards. Chashm-e-Num was also her acting debut in which she played a role of a blind girl and story was about a blind couple features her opposite Ahsan Khan. She made her film debut with Mohammed Ehteshamuddin's directed feature film Dum Mastam in which she paired opposite Imran Ashraf and also wrote the project herself. The film was released in May 2022. Khan's First written project for Geo Tv is a Ramadan play Heer Da Hero which got highest ratings and critical acclaim for its wit and humour.

== Filmography ==
=== As actor ===
| Year | Title | Role | Notes | Ref. |
|---|---|---|---|---|
| 2022 | Dum Mastam | Aaliya Sikandar | Debut film; Also as writer | |

=== As writer ===
| Year | Title | Notes | Ref(s) |
|---|---|---|---|
| 2016 | Azaad Masi | Premiered at Delhi International Film Festival & Children's International Film Festival, Lahore | |
| 2017 | Black Wednesday | Premiered at American Film Showcase | |
| 2023 | Heer Da Hero | As a writer and lead actress | |

=== Television ===
| Year | Title | Role | Network | Notes |
|---|---|---|---|---|
| 2016 | Bad Gumaan | Saman | Hum TV | |
| 2018 | Belapur Ki Dayan | Neelofur (witch) | Hum TV | |
| 2018 | Ghughi | Nirmala | TV One Pakistan | |
| 2019 | Dil-e-Bereham | Ayeza | A plus | |
| 2019 | Dil-e-Gumshuda | Alizeh | Geo Entertainment | |
| 2021 | Qayamat | Samra | Geo Entertainment | |
| 2021 | Baddua | Abeer | ARY Digital | |
| 2023 | Heer Da Hero | Heer | Geo Entertainment | |
| 2024 | Breaking News | Mishaal | Green Entertainment | |
| 2026 | Mitti De Baway | Zareena | Green Entertainment | |

=== Anthology series ===
| Year | Title | Role | Network | Notes |
|---|---|---|---|---|
| 2018 | Ustani Jee | Sanober | Hum TV | Episode: 12, 13 |
| 2019 | Choti Choti Batain | Zeena | Hum TV | Episode: "Roop" |
| 2020 | Aik Aur Munafiq | Hamna | Geo Entertainment | Episode: "Taqdeer" |
| 2023 | Kitni Girhain Baqi Hain | Laiba | Hum TV | Episode: Gol Roti |

=== Music video ===
| Year | Title | Artist | Notes |
|---|---|---|---|
| 2019 | "Adha Adha" | Shani Arshad; opposite Ali Rehman Khan | |
