= Ek Hatheli Pe Hina Ek Hatheli Pe Lahoo =

- Written by: Amna Mufti
- Directed by: Babar Javed
- Starring: Aamina Sheikh; Fahad Mustafa; Faysal Quraishi; Sana Askari
- Country of origin: Pakistan
- Original language: Urdu
- No. of episodes: 28

Production
- Producers: Babar Javed; Asif Raza Mir
- Production company: A&B Entertainment

Original release
- Network: Geo Entertainment
- Release: 13 May 2011 – 2011

Ek Hatheli Pe Hina Ek Hatheli Pe Lahoo is a Pakistani television series directed by Babar Javed who co-produced it also with Asif Raza Mir under A&B Entertainment. It is written by Amna Mufti, marking her screenwriting debut. It stars Aamina Sheikh, Fahad Mustafa, Faysal Quraishi and Sana Askari as leads. The series is about the repercussions of important decisions of one's life and the clash of egos, and centres on the life of two individuals who face obstacles in their relationship due to the difference in the sects and the egos of the people around them. It premiered on Geo Entertainment on 13 May 2011.

== Plot ==
Hijab, a university student from a low-income family, lives with her parents, her younger sister Neha, and her cousin Najeeb. Najeeb, who is in his late twenties, was raised by Hijab's father, Qureshi, after the death of his mother. Despite Qureshi's efforts, Najeeb couldn't complete his master's degree, blaming the demand of managing the family's shop.

At university, Hijab befriends a classmate named Zain, who also happens to be her neighbour. Unbeknownst to Hijab, Zain secretly has feelings for her. Encouraged by his friend, Haris, he gathers the courage to approach her. However, Najeeb learns about Zain's intentions and warns Hijab to stay away from him. Hijab's mother, Rubina, also discovers the situation and cautions her daughter, sharing the tragic story of her aunt Naseema's experience with love.

One day, while Hijab is on her way to university, one of Najeeb's friends, Taifi, informs him that she is meeting Zain secretly. Najeeb becomes furious, confronts Hijab, and takes her home. He blames her for her actions and angrily reprimands her. Hijab finally tells him to shut up, arguing that he has neither the authority nor the right to dictate her life. As their argument escalates, and Rubina becomes unconscious and is taken to the hospital. At the hospital, Hijab comes across her aunt Naseema on her death, suffering from cancer. After Rubina's recovery, Hijab and Najeeb resolve their differences. Najeeb agrees to give Hijaab a ride to her university's farewell party, but he gets late, so Zain ends up dropping her home instead.

Zain convinces his parents to send a marriage proposal to Hijab's family. They visit Hijab's house, but Qureshi flatly refuses the proposal because of the difference in their sects. He even behaves rudely toward Zain's family and orders them to leave. As a result, Zain's family decides to sever all ties with Hijab's family.

Because of Zain's proposal, Qureshi changes his mind and decides to marry Hijab to Najeeb, despite his earlier reservations about the match. The following day, Zain comes to their street with Haris, and a fight breaks out between them and Najeeb. Haris and Najeeb sustain minor injuries.

Following the incident, Qureshi forces Hijab to abandon her studies and marry Najeeb. Hijab, however, has no inclination for Najeeb and is forced into the marriage against her wishes.

When Hijab visits Naseema in the hospital with her mother, Naseema advises her to be with Zain because she believes that he genuinely loves her. Hijab is influenced by this advice, especially because she considers Zain to be a better person than Najeeb.

A day before her wedding, Zain calls Hijab and asks her to meet him one last time. Despite the risks, she agrees and meets him on the night of her Mehndi ceremony. Najeeb discovers their meeting and becomes enraged. He chases them with a gun, but Haris intervenes and helps Hijab and Zain escape to his uncle's farmhouse.

From the farmhouse, Hijab contacts her sister Neha and explains the situation, assuring her that everything happened accidentally and that she will return home soon. However, Neha forbids her from returning and reveals that she has been married to Najeeb.

Meanwhile, Najeeb and Qureshi try to recover their car, through which Hijab and Zain were eloped, and put pressure on Agha to help them. The residents of the mohalla also humiliate Agha due to the involvement of his son in the elopement. Haris's uncle eventually sends Hijab, Zain, and Haris to a safer, impoverished locality.

While staying there, Hijab and Zain lose their Nikahnama and their money. Zain contacts Agha, who eventually agrees to allow them to return home. On their return, they learn that Agha has been murdered. Najeeb and Qureshi gets frightened due to the fear of accusation of his murder. They also learn that Zain and Hijab have returned. Hijab contacts Neha by phone, but Najeeb remembers the condition he had given his uncle: if anyone in the family contacted Hijab, he would divorce Neha. Despite this, he does not divorce her.

Zain decides to move abroad but faces difficulties because their Nikahnama is missing. He goes with Hijab to complete the necessary documentation, but Najeeb kidnaps Hijab on the way. When Qureshi learns about the kidnapping, he orders Najeeb to bring Hijab home, reminding him that she is his daughter.

Zain, unable to take legal action due to lacking proof of his marriage with Hijab, goes to Qureshi's house to bring Hijab back, but she refuses to leave with him due to the fear that Najeeb will kill him. Although Neha supports Hijab, Najeeb's companions brutally beat Zain there.

Zain tells his family that he has decided to divorce Hijaab after her refusal to come with him. His mother, Jijji, who had never supported the relationship, supports his decision.

To keep Hijab away from Zain, Najeeb and Qureshi also file a case for Khula in court. Meanwhile, Hijab discovers about her pregnant but her mother asks her to have an abortion. She initially agrees, but Neha makes her realize the consequences, after which she refuses to abort the child and decides to return to Zain.

She rushes to Zain's house, but he is not there. She encounters his uncle, Qaim, and asks him to let her meet Zain, but he refuses, believing that Hijab's request is merely a tactic. With no other option, Hijab returns home. She is shattered on receiving a legal notice of divorce from Zain. On Jijji's advice, Zain decides to move abroad to study at Cambridge after handing over his business to Qasim.

Meanwhile, Najeeb takes away all of Hijab's wedding jewellery and her Mahr and continues to harass her. His obsession with Hijab causes Neha to turn against her elder sister. Hijab is devastated when she receives the third divorce notice from Zain, who subsequently leaves the country with Jijji.

Neha becomes pregnant with Najeeb's son, but his behaviour toward her remains cold and distant. One night, Qureshi catches Najeeb harassing Hijab and lashes out at him. Najeeb defends himself by claiming that the family had wronged him by marrying him to Neha when he had never been interested in her because Hijab had originally been his fiancée. During the argument, he even pushes Qureshi, leaving him shocked and worried.

The upset Qureshi shares his concerns with Miskeen Ali, the Nazim of the mohalla. Miskeen decides to help the family. After discussing the situation with neighbours, he decides to bring her to his house so that she can live there peacefully during her Iddah, away from Najeeb.

Two to three days after the figh, Najeeb eventually returns and apologizes to Qureshi. Meanwhile, Miskeen discusses the situation with his wife, Ghulam Zakariya, and sends her to bring Hijab to their house. Hijab goes with her, and Najeeb feels powerless when he learns that she has left.

Because of the gossip spreading throughout the mohalla, Miskeen decides to marry Hijab, presenting the marriage as an act intended for the welfare of the family and to protect her reputation. Hijab's parents agree to the proposal.

In the meantime, Hijab gives birth to Zain's child. After her marriage to Miskeen, she moves into his house with her son. However, Zakariya does not accept Hijab and treats her roughly, along with her daughter Nudrat. Zakariya and Nudrat even accuse Hijab of stealing jewellery, but Miskeen does not believe them. He advises her to work as a schoolteacher so that she can keep herself occupied and become financially independent. After discovering that Najeeb had been falsifying the shop's accounts, Qureshi decides to take over the management of the shop himself.

Meanwhile, Zain decides to return from the UK. During his visit of a local school as the director of the NGO running it, he meets Hijab there. Hijab eventually reveals the truth about everything that has happened. Zain becomes restless and excited to meet his son. He contacts Hijab by phone late at night, which raises suspicions in Miskeen and Zakariya's minds. One day, Hijab's son has a minor accident at home. She takes him to the hospital and contacts Zain so that he can finally meet his son. However, Miskeen arrives at the hospital and finds Zain there. His suspicions are confirmed. Within a few days, Miskeen divorces Hijab.

Hijab becomes homeless after the divorce, but Aziza, a nurse at the hospital, comes to her aid and offers her the hostel of the hospital to stay.

Meanwhile, Jijji reveals the truth about Zain: he is not actually her biological son. Agha had rescued Zain from a fire-ravaged house while he was on his way to offer prayers and had subsequently raised him as his own. Zain visits Hijab, and tells the whole story to her and Aziza, and they console him. When Hijaab's parents arrive to take her home after her divorce, she refuses to return with them. Aziza questions Hijab's parents further about Najeeb and Zain and eventually concludes that the two men are actually brothers. Qureshi reveals there that Najeeb had also been rescued by him, who had raised him as his own son.

Hijab's family finally realizes the grave mistake they have made and the hatred they have allowed to divide everyone. Jijji also arrives there with Zain, and announces that she will wholeheartedly accept Hijab as her daughter-in-law.

However, Najeeb, who is furious after a heated confrontation with Miskeen, is manipulated into believing that he should kill Zain because Zain intends to marry Hijab. Najeeb arrives at the scene and shoots Zain.

A police officer also arrives at the scene chasing Najeeb and shoots him. As Najeeb lies dying, Hijab cries out that he has shot his own biological brother. Both brothers die, and Hijab's parents finally realize the devastating consequences of the hatred and divisions they have fostered throughout their lives.

Jijji arrives at Hijab's house and asks her parents to send her to her house, reminding them that it was Zain's wish for his son to be raised in his family home. Hijab makes the decision herself and leaves with Jijji, taking her son with her.

== Cast ==
- Aamina Sheikh as Hijab
- Fahad Mustafa as Zain
- Faysal Quraishi as Najeeb
- Sana Askari as Neha
- Fareeha Jabeen as Rubina
- Sohail Asghar as Qureshi
- Azra Aftab as Jijji
- Rashid Farooqui as Zain's uncle
- Salahuddin Tunio as Miskeen Ali "Nazim"
- Fazal as Taifi
- Atif Rathore as Ahmad
- Shahzad Mukhatr as Qasim
- Ghazala Javaid as Ghulam Zakariya
- Riz Kamali as Nuzhat
- Farah Nadeem as Aziza

== Soundtrack ==
Abu Muhammad performed the original soundtrack of the series, with music by Waqar Ali and lyrics by Sabir Zafar.

== Production ==
To begin to write for the screen, Amna Mufti contacted Babar Javed through Facebook and submit her story for the series. The script involved the mutual writing and discussions, marking the screenwriting debut of Mufti.

== Reception ==
Without mentioning the name of the series, Abdul Khaliq Khan, a former head of content of the network told to Dawn that all the sectarian references were removed from the series during production. Mufti also viewed that the series faced a lot of censorship.

=== Critical reception ===
In a review for Mag The Weekly, the reviewer found that Aamina Sheikh and Fahad Mustafa has done justice to their roles but found the roles selection by Sheikh too similar.
