= Raqs-e-Bismil =

Pakistani television series

- Title Poster
- Genre: Drama; Romance
- Written by: Hashim Nadeem
- Directed by: Wajahat Rauf
- Starring: Imran Ashraf; Sarah Khan
- Opening theme: "Raqs-e-Bismil" by Vicky Akbar
- Composer: Hassan Ali
- Country of origin: Pakistan
- Original language: Urdu
- No. of seasons: 1
- No. of episodes: 28

Production
- Producers: Shazia Wajahat; Momina Duraid
- Production locations: Karachi, Pakistan
- Camera setup: Multi-camera setup
- Running time: 40-42 minutes
- Production companies: Showcase Productions; MD Productions

Original release
- Network: Hum TV
- Release: 25 December 2020 – 9 July 2021

Raqs-e-Bismil (Urdu: رقص بسمل, lit. 'Dance of the Wounded') is a Pakistani television series that premiered on Hum TV from 25 December 2020 to 9 July 2021. It is directed by acclaimed film director Wajahat Rauf and produced by his wife Shazia Wajahat under Showcase Productions. It features Imran Ashraf and Sarah Khan as leads. It is digitally available on Hum TV's YouTube channel.

== Plot ==
Sakina, a young girl runs away to marry her love Kamran. Moosa, Sakina's cousin and milk brother, arrives with his brother to stop the secret wedding ceremony. He waves his gun around and takes Sakina by the hand. When they return home, he gathers everyone and tells them what Sakina was going to do. Sakina's uncle fixes her marriage with his son, Isa. The Nikkah takes place against Sakina's will and she curses Moosa that he too shall fall in love with someone whose love he cannot have.

Then after a week, Moosa told his mother that he will only marry someone if she wears a hijab and her hands are also covered meaning she should be a very religious girl. Once he sees a girl named Zohra (Family calls her Zari) on a bus, wearing hijab and gloves and Musa gets attracted and falls in love with her at first sight. He starts following that girl daily as she is a university student.

On following her for days, he suddenly proposes to her but instead of considering it, she tells him to reach a certain address at night. He reaches that place at the stated time and is shocked to see that it's a modern party and to see Zohra dancing in jeans and a shirt. He learns the reality that Zohra is a dancer for private occasions. Moosa is shocked and quite angry and drags Zohra out of the party and confronts her for concealing her real identity. Zohra in reply criticizes the hypocritical standards set by men and says that true love is not affected by the good or bad of the other person. The people at the party had called the police after seeing Moosa misbehave with Zohra and Moosa was arrested. Moosa’s family is shocked and angry but after he is released, warns him to stay away and gets him engaged to Sitara. For days, Moosa tries to forget Zohra but fails. He decides to meet Zohra with the help of a hawker, Murad (nickname 'Namurad'), near Zohra's residence. He takes away the money (that Musa had given him) to Anna Ji (Zohra's mother) and requests him to allow Musa with Zohra to meet. In return of the money given by Moosa, Anna Ji allows Zohra and she goes away with Moosa. There Moosa has arranged all the setup of Nikkah e.g. Maulvi Sahab and Gawahaan. Zohra is shocked when she comes across about the Nikkah. She criticizes him and says that he isn't in love, this is his controlling nature and stubbornness. And that the most important thing in a nikkah is that both guy and girl are willing. Moosa realises and cancels the Nikkah. He drops Zohra back to her house where Anna ji was beating Muraad as Zohra did not return and he told her that she will marry Musa. When Musa goes to his house, his father confronts him and Sakina slaps him for being hypocritical as Sakina was forcefully married to Isa by Musa even though she wanted to marry a man from a respectable family but Musa is in love with a tawaif despite being engaged.

All this while Sakina was still in contact with Kamran and is planning to run with him ASAP. She is rude to Isa who tries his best to win her heart over. One fine day Sakina tells Isa at drop her to her friends house. When Isa leaves she quickly calls Kamran that she has arrived, Kamran promises to come and take her far with him. He instructs her to stay at his friends' house until he comes. When Sakina goes there those three friends try to misbehave with Sakina. Suddenly Musa arrives at the scene with a gun and shoots the three men. He warns Sakina to not tell anyone about this. The Police arrests Musa and everyone thinks that Zohra was the woman Musa shot the three men. Sakina breaks up with Kamran that very moment and starts making it work with Isa.

On the other hand, Zohra meets Malik Shahryar, a rich businessman who is looking for a girl that he could go out in parties with and satisfy his male friends. He finds Zohra to be perfect for this and sends his man to take his proposal to Anna. Zohra rejects it. Malik Shahryar then sends papers to Anna without revealing his identity that she has to empty her house and leave to live somewhere else or pay a ton of money. Upon learning this Zohra agrees to marry Shereyar as he can give her all this money. Shereyar's plan is successful and they marry. Shahryar doesn't let her meet her family members and always wants her to dress up in front of his colleagues. When Zohra says that she wants to be at home and live a respectful life with him, he tells her that he already has a first wife and kids and the sole purpose of marrying Zohra is to use her for his financial gain. Here Zohra realises that Shereyar did not marry Zohra but rather this marriage was a business deal. She regrets rejecting Musa and realises his love for her. Anna Ji and her best friend Chanda haven't met Zohra since her marriage and were worried about her.

The three men Musa had shot survived and Muraad gets Musa released. Musa doesn't return to his family but gets a job as the bodyguard to a famous actress Laila. Upon attending an elite party of Laila where Shahryar also came with Zohra, Musa and Zohra see each other. Zohra is deeply hurt seeing how much Musa has lost because of being in love with her. His family, property, his reputation. Zohra requests him to go back to his family. Late at night, Shereyar's senior business partner who was interested in Zohra cunningly gets Zohra in his room and tries to misbehave with her. Musa saves Zohra and Zohra falls in love with him. When she tells him about what his friend intends to do, Shahryar doesn't believe her and instead questions what was she doing in his room late at night. Zohra is heartbroken seeing how soulless he is despite being her husband while Musa whose life changed for the bad because of Zohra still cares for her like her own.

Musa's father and Isa spots Musa with Laila and from there, Isa gets very keen on finding out who that woman is when Musa shoots the three assailants. He goes to the three men's bodies that were discovered and realises this is the same location Sakina asked him to drop saying that this is her friends out that very day. He also sees Kamran there and becomes angry at Sakina. He confronts her and she admits her sin. Isa becomes very disturbed and starts behaving very coldly with Sakina. Isa takes Sakina with him to that location telling Kamraan to come or else he'll be dead real soon. Isa traps them and points a gun at them. Musa arrives and Isa stops himself and leaves Sakina to make a final choice on whom she'll continue her life with, who chooses Isa.

Meanwhile, Laila, whose husband wants her dead, plans a deadly attack on her thinking that all the blame will go on Musa as he has previously been a criminal. Laila is hit at night and she is severely injured and taken to the emergency. Musa finds out about the man who attacked her and gets him to admit to the police that it was Laila's husband and both are arrested. Laila thanks Musa and there asks him why someone so soft-spoken and religious has committed crimes, is never seen with his family and hasn't married yet. Musa tells her about Zohra.

Laila secretly calls Shereyar telling him to divorce Zohra so she and Musa and can be together and she will pay him as much as he desires. Zohra goes to meet Musa and there she confesses her love for him, but says that she doesn't deserve him and now its impossible for them to be together. Musa doesn't care and thanks her and Allah that all his suffering was worth it as Zohra has now said what he wanted to hear since the moment he saw her.

Shahryar is visited by her brother-in-law (of his first wife) who warns him to divorce Zohra or divorce their sister. On doing this he will not get any share in their property nor be allowed to meet his children. Shahryar thinks he will get money from Laila as well as her brother-in-law. He divorces Zohra and throws her out of the house. When Zohra leaves, having Musa in her mind, she is hit by a car and gets a head injury. The twist is that Zohra is hit by one of the men of Laila's husband who knows that she is Shereyaar's wife and thinks that Shereyar will give him sums of money after finding out that he took care of his wife. He takes her home where his wife takes care of Zohra.

Anna and Chanda learn about Zohra being divorced and Anna gets a depression attack. They realise that no matter how wealthy a man is, he can't keep his wife happy unless she's given respect care and love. They also regret rejecting musa. Chanda contacts musa and tells him that Zohra is divorced and lost. Musa arrives and goes out to look for Zohra.

Laila gets to know about Zohra's kidnapping this and tells kidnappers that she will give huge amount of money to them in return of a fade Zohra. Zohra manages to escape however goes to a dargah to pray. As she can't go back to Anna Ji and her house neither to Musa, she requests Allah to take her life. At that very moment, Zohra faints on the ground. Musa's father and Issa were present there and check the condition of Zohra. After she gains consciousness and tells them that her husband has divorced her, the elder owner of dargah gives peer Qudrat Ullah, (Musa's father) to take her responsibility and keep her safe until her iddat is complete. Not knowing her real identity, peer qudrat ullah agrees and takes her to his home. Zohra at first does not realize that she is at Musa's house until she meets Musa's mother who had visited her in the past and begged her to leave Musa's life. Musa's mother comes and apologizes to Zohra as she realises that the class difference is created by us humans and after Musa leaves she finds herself remembering him every second and that her family is incomplete without Musa. Musa coincidently meets the ill Sitara in a hospital where he tells her to move on and start living a happy and healthy life. They both make peace. Sakina, who befriended zohra very well and shared how she misses her brother Musa, overhears Zohra's conversation with Anna ji, telling her that she is alright, no worries. Sakina is surprised but finds this a way bring her brother back and unite the 2 lovers. She informs Issa that she knows the girl Musa is dying to know about, and will tell him on one condition. Which is that he will forgive her for all her past mistakes and start living with her how he used to, Issa agrees and she informs about Zareen being Musa's Zohra. Issa rushes and tells this to hopeless Musa who had been looking for her everywhere. Musa is really happy and plans to bring Zohra back from there and marry her. Before that, peer Qudrat Ullah fixed Zohra's nikkah with a decent boy named Ahmed. He asks for Zohra's permission, and Zohra agrees. Sakina and Musa's mother and aunt scold Zohra on why she didn't refuse. A heartbroken zohra tells them that one day peer sahab will find out her identity and she will lose this roof and respect she is given by him. Hence she chooses to do as he wills and promises to bring musa back after her nikkah. On the other hand, Shahryar is shown to become completely broke as his first wife ended their marriage and he lost all his property, that he was given by his brother in laws. He is shown to be refused by his colleague and is left with nobody to turn to. On the other hand, Musa upon learning that zohra's nikkah is fixed with someone else, he suddenly shows up at his house and forcefully takes zohra outside to take and her marry her. Peer qudrat ullah stops him and zohra tells him that she isn't forced and will wholeheartedly accept whatever peer sahab will order her. Heartbroken musa sheds a tear. Peer qudratullah learns that zareen is actually the zohra musa had fallen for. Seeing that zohra is actually the religious, mature, pure hearted zareen he took care of in all these months, he realises that judging people merely on the basis of their family background and how religious or secular they are is wrong. Zohra also comes to him and apologizes for hiding the facts. Pir Qudratullah starts second guessing his actions. It isn't until musa visits ahmed to take his promise that he will keep zohra happy and never leave her out, that ahmed finds out why musa was kicked of the family, jailed etc. He goes to peer sahab and tells him and he can marry zohra but she will never live happily with him, don't you want your son to come back, for your family to become exactly the way it was. Peer sahab calls musa and asks him can he marry zohra, they both forget the past and reunite with a hug. Peer sahab and Issa go up to zohra and all the women in the household to read out the nikkah agreement. Zohra forcing all her emotions inside, accepting that she and musa can't be together, is ready to say yes to her marriage with Ahmed. Suddenly Peer Sahab reads out Moosa’s name. Everyone brushes it off thinking it might be a mistake. Until peer sahab once again calls out musa's hand in marriage to zohra. The shocked and happy zohra is encouraged by everyone to say yes. She does so and in the end, Zohra and Moosa are seen praying and thanking Allah, telling each other to live on this dream forever.

== Themes and analysis ==
Raqs-e-Bismil highlights the themes of societal hypocrisy and patriarchal double standards, serving as a social satire that critiques the elite's hypocrisy and the societal norms that perpetuate it.

== Cast ==
=== Main lead ===
- Imran Ashraf as Musa Shah
- Sarah Khan as Zohra Musa Shah

=== Pivotal roles ===
- Anoushay Abbasi as Sakina Essa Shah (Essa's wife)
- Amn Ashhad as Herself
- Momin Saqib as Essa Shah (Musa's brother & Sakina's husband)
- Zara Sheikh as Laila Khalid
- Javeria Abbasi as Khadija Shah (Sakina's mother)
- Mehmood Aslam as Pir Qudratullah Shah (Musa & Essa's father)
- Nida Mumtaz as Hajra Qudratullah Shah (Musa & Essa's mother)
- Gul-e-Rana as Anna ji
- Farah Nadir as Saeeda
- Rashid Farooqui as Saranga (Musa's jailmate)
- Saleem Mairaj as Murad Ali a.k.a. Namurad (Musa's friend)
- Furqan Qureshi as Malik Shahryar
- Taha Humayun as Kamran (Sakina's lover)
- Babar Khan as Guru ji
- Benazir Khan as Chanda (Zohra's best friend)
- Fariya Hassan as Sitara Fazal Shah
- Shehzad Malik as Pir Fazal Shah (Sitara's father)
- Shazia Qaiser as Shaista Fazal Shah (Sitara's mother)
- Sajid Shah as Shehbaaz Gill (Shehryar's friend)
- Azeem Sajjad as Tauqeer Khalid (Laila's husband & Shehryar's friend)
- Tahir Jatoi as Faizi (Laila's bodyguard & Saeeda's husband)
- Umer Aalam as Ahmed

== Production ==
The series marked the television debut of Lollywood actress Zara Sheikh.

The initial teasers were released on 25 November 2020.

== Reception ==
=== UK ratings ===
The 11th episode of the serial was the highest rated show on Hum TV in the UK for the week it was broadcast and was watched by 113,800 viewers.

=== Lux Style Awards ===
Ceremony	Categories	Recipients	Result
21st Lux Style Awards	Best TV Director	Wajahat Rauf	Nominated
21st Lux Style Awards	Best TV Actor-Viewers' Choice	Imran Ashraf	Nominated
21st Lux Style Awards	Best TV Actor-Critics' Choice	Imran Ashraf	Nominated
21st Lux Style Awards	Best Emerging Talent in TV	Momin Saqib	Nominated
