= Osama Tahir =

Pakistani actor

- اسامہ طاہر
- Born: 6 March 1990 (age 36); Karachi, Pakistan
- Education: Institute of Business Management (MBA)
- Occupations: Actor; model; producer
- Years active: 2017 - present
- Notable work: Carma – The Movie; Dar Si Jaati Hai Sila; Ruswai; Chalay Thay Saath

Osama Tahir is a Pakistani television actor, producer and film actor. He has worked and starred in several critically acclaimed television serials such as Dar Si Jaati Hai Sila, Belapur Ki Dayan and Hania, the first of which earned him a nomination for the Lux Style Award for Best Emerging Talent. Later he appeared in dramas such as Mushk, Neeli Zinda Hai and Baddua.

== Early life ==
Tahir completed his studies from Institute of Business Management and graduated with an MBA degree. He auditioned for a theatre play called Starlight at Pakistan American Cultural Center, and then he did theatre for ten years.

== Career ==
Tahir made his acting debut with Umer Adil's 2017 film Chalay Thay Saath, in which he played the role of a young boy named Zain.

He made his television debut by starring in Kashif Nisar's Dar Si Jaati Hai Sila, where he portrayed the character of Raheel opposite Yumna Zaidi. He received a Lux Style Award nomination for the role. He then portrayed a young man in supernatural-horror serial Belapur Ki Dayan, a helpless romantic man in domestic drama Hania and an ambitious and steadfast guy in historical drama Deewar-e-Shab.

In May 2020, he launched his own YouTube channel.

Tahir appeared in a lead role in Carma, directed by Kashan Admani. He played the characters of Hamza & Haroon in the film.

== Filmography ==
=== Television series ===
| Year | Title | Role | Network | Notes |
|---|---|---|---|---|
| 2017 | Dar Si Jaati Hai Sila | Raheel | Hum TV | |
| 2017 | Belapur Ki Dayan | Rameez | Hum TV | |
| 2018 | Hania | Rohan | ARY Digital | |
| 2018 | Mere Bewafa | Khizar | A-Plus Entertainment | |
| 2019 | Choti Choti Batain - Dil Hi Tou Hai | Saif Hassan | Hum TV | |
| 2019 | Deewar-e-Shab | Maaz Islam | Hum TV | |
| 2019 | Ruswai | Hamza | ARY Digital | |
| 2020 | Mushk | Shayan | Hum TV | |
| 2021 | Neeli Zinda Hai | Pervaiz | ARY Digital | |
| 2021 | Baddua | Affan | ARY Digital | |
| 2021 | Nehar | Adeel | Hum TV | |
| 2022 | Betiyaan | Saad | ARY Digital | |
| 2023 | Mujhay Qabool Nahin | Arsalan | Geo Entertainment | |
| 2024 | Khaie | Badal | Geo Entertainment | |
| 2024 | Kaisi Hai Ye Ruswai | Arbaaz | Express Entertainment | |
| 2024 | Bayhadh | Taimoor | Geo Entertainment | |
| 2024 | Yahya | Imran | Geo Entertainment | |
| 2025 | Dayan | Hunain Shah | Geo Entertainment | |
| 2025 | Bekhaway | Jahangir | Geo Entertainment | |
| 2025 | Main Zameen Tu Aasmaan | Farhan | Green Entertainment | |
| 2025 | Mafaad Parast | Hadi | Geo Entertainment | |
| 2026 | Khush Naseebi | Humayun | Geo TV | |

=== Film ===
| Year | Title | Role | Ref. |
|---|---|---|---|
| 2017 | Chalay Thay Saath | Zain | |
| 2022 | Carma | Hamza / Haroon | |

== Awards and nominations ==
| Year | Award | Category | Result | Title | Ref. |
|---|---|---|---|---|---|
| 2018 | 18th Lux Style Awards | Best Emerging Talent | Nominated | Dar Si Jaati Hai Sila | |
| 2019 | 7th Hum Awards | Best Supporting Actor | Nominated | Dar Si Jaati Hai Sila | |
| 2019 | 7th Hum Awards | Best New Sensation Television Male | Won | Dar Si Jaati Hai Sila | |
| 2020 | 8th Hum Awards | Best On-screen Couple | Nominated | Dar Si Jaati Hai Sila | |
| 2020 | 8th Hum Awards | Best Actor in a leading Role | Nominated | Belapur Ki Dayan | |
