= Chalay Thay Saath =

2017 Pakistani film by Umer Adil

- Chalay Thay Saath چلے تھے ساتھ
- Directed by: Umer Adil
- Written by: Atiya Zaidi
- Produced by: Sheikh Shiraz Mubashir
- Starring: Syra Shehroz; Kent S. Leung; Zhalay Sarhadi; Osama Tahir; Mansha Pasha
- Cinematography: Shahzad Khan
- Edited by: M. Arsalan (SharpImage)
- Music by: Abbas Ali Khan
- Production company: We Think Films / Hot Water Bottle Films
- Release date: 21 April 2017 (Pakistan)
- Country: Pakistan
- Language: Urdu
- Box office: Rs. 1.50 crore (US$54,000)

Chalay Thay Saath (Urdu: چلے تھے ساتھ) is a 2017 Pakistani romance film directed by Umer Adil with producer Beenish Umer and Executive Producer Sheikh Shiraz Mubashir starring Syra Shehroz, Osama Tahir, Zhalay Sarhadi, Behroze Sabzwari, Mansha Pasha, Faris Khalid, Kent S. Leung, Shamim Hilaly and Sherbaaz Kaleem. It is executively produced by Sheikh Shiraz Mubashir. The film was released on 21 April 2017.

== Plot ==
The film is based around the character of Resham, a doctor who is on a journey to discover her past and future alongside her friends. The film depicts a cross-border love story between a Chinese man and Resham, which ends in their marriage.

== Cast ==
- Syra Shehroz as Resham
- Kent S. Leung as Adam
- Osama Tahir as Zain
- Mansha Pasha as Tania
- Zhalay Sarhadi as Aleena
- Behroze Sabzwari as Baba
- Faris Khalid as Faraz
- Shamim Hilaly as Aqsa Aunty
- Sherbaaz Kaleem as Sherbaz
- Sidra Niazi as Resham's mother
- Hani Taha as Party girl

== Production ==
=== Casting ===
The ensemble cast includes Syra Shahroz playing the character of Resham, a doctor on the road to discover her personal past and future. Kent S. Leung's character is playing the love interest of Syra's character Resham. Faris Khalid, Osama Tahir, Mansha Pasha and Zhalay Sarhadi all will play the roles of Resham's friends. Veteran actors Behroz Subzwari and Shamim Hilali play important roles as the story unfolds with Sherbaaz Kaleem brings in the local Hunza feel with his narrative

=== Filming ===
The film is focused the Hunza culture and it was shot in the Northern Areas of Pakistan in the region of Gilgit-Baltistan It took the film crew over 40 days to complete the film shoot in the Hunza region.

== Release ==
The film was released on 21 April 2017 in Pakistan. The Film was later released in Hong Kong, China in 2018.

=== Box office ===
The film opened up to mainly empty cinemas. The film collected 75 lacs in its first week. The film hardly ran for 3 weeks in cinemas and grossed 1.5 crores in its lifetime run in Pakistan. The film was also later released in Hong Kong.

=== Critical reception ===
The film generally received mixed reviews but critics mainly criticised its script. Hamna Zubair of Images Dawn praised the actors but said that "The film is proof that without clear vision and a tight script even the most talented performers fail to impress". Rafay of the Express Tribune gave it 2 out of 5 stars and wrote that "One wonders how many talented people are going to bear the brunt of shallow characters and pointless plots on their way to big screen recognition". Hira Aftab of Youlin Magazine praised the actors and Umer Adil's direction and wrote that "Overall, though, Chalay Thay Saath is a must-watch for anyone who wants to witness the new direction of Pakistani cinema and the increasing depth of the Pak-China bond".

=== Accolades ===
Ceremony	Won	Nominated
17th Lux Style Awards		Zhalay Sarhadi – Best Supporting Actress
4th Galaxy Lollywood Awards	Syra Shehroz – Best Female Debut	Syra Shehroz – Best Actor in a Leading Role Female; Atiya Zaidi – Best Story; Mansha Pasha – Best Actor in a Supporting Role Female

== See also ==
- List of Pakistani films of 2017
