= Nazo (TV series) =

Pakistani television series

- Genre: Serial drama Psychological thriller
- Written by: Samina Ejaz
- Directed by: Aabis Raza
- Starring: Sonya Hussain; Ahmed Ali; Rashid Farooqui; Zhalay Sarhadi; Atiqa Odho
- Country of origin: Pakistan
- Original language: Urdu
- No. of episodes: 22

Production
- Producers: Fahad Mustafa; Dr. Ali Kazmi
- Production locations: Karachi, Sindh, Pakistan
- Production company: Big Bang Entertainment

Original release
- Network: Urdu 1
- Release: 27 July – 21 December 2015

Nazo (Urdu: نازو) is a 2015 Pakistani thriller drama television series aired on Urdu 1. The serial is produced by Fahad Mustafa and Dr Ali Kazmi under Big Bang Entertainment. It is based on the real-life of a mentally challenged girl, Nanu, better known as Naazo. It explores the life of Nazo, a mentally challenged girl played by Sonya Hussain and the suffering faced by her family while taking care of her which has its own set of challenges.

== Cast ==
- Sonya Hussain as Nazo
- Ahmed Ali
- Zhalay Sarhadi
- Atiqa Odho
- Rashid Farooqui
- Yasra Rizvi
- Beena Chaudhary as Aliya
- Dabeer Naqvi
- Sami Sani (guest appearance)
- Nanu
- Hassaan Ibrahim
