= Amna Mufti =

Pakistani screenwriter and columnist

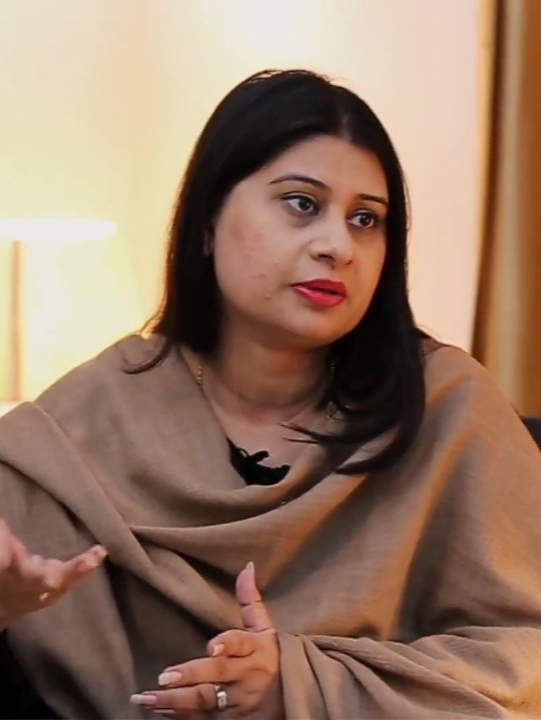
- Mufti in 2021
- Born: Lahore, Punjab, Pakistan
- Education: University of the Punjab
- Occupations: Novelist; screenwriter; columnist
- Writing career
- Language: Urdu

Amna Mufti (Punjabi, Urdu: آمنہ مفتی) is a screenwriter, columnist and author from Pakistan. She has written at least five novels and more than twenty television series. Her accolades include a Lux Style Award and a PEN Award.

== Early life ==
She spent her childhood in a remote village near the Sutlej River. She started writing poetry in her school and college days. Later, she sent her ghazals to Ahmed Nadeem Qasmi who motivated her to write prose instead of poetry.

== Personal life ==
Mufti is a professor at Punjab University, Lahore.

== Career ==
=== As an author ===
She wrote her first short story Phir Wohi Dasht which was published in Adab Dost in 1998. In 2020, her novel about the water crisis Pani Mar Raha Hai was published.

=== As a screenwriter ===
She made her debut as a screenwriter in 2011 when she approached Babar Javed and wrote Ek Hatheli Pe Hina Ek Hatheli Pe Lahoo. She then gave the idea of another series based on dowry problems in Pakistan which was accepted readily and she wrote Jahez resultantly which aired on Geo Entertainment in the same year. For the series, she received her first Lux Style Award nomination as a Best Television Writer at the 12th Lux Style Awards.

In 2013, the adaptation of her short story Ullu Baraye Farokht Nahi was aired on Hum TV for which she wrote the screenplay as well. The series was directed by Kashif Nisar and Mufti received critical acclaim for her script and Best Television Writer Award at the 13th Lux Style Awards. The script of the series was later made available as a book.

In 2017, she adapted the Amrita Pritam's 1950 novel Pinjar for television which broadcast on TV One as Ghughi. Amar Khan and Adnan Siddiqui played the leads in it and Mufti was nominated for Best Television Writer at the 18th Lux Style Awards.

In 2018, she wrote Aakhri Station deals with issues such as such as women's rights, mental and health hazards, acid attacks, forced prostitution, and domestic violence. The series was directed by Sarmad Khoosat and produced by Kashf Foundation.

Based on several social evils such as child abuse sex trafficking, she wrote Dil Na Umeed To Nahi which was directed by Kashif Nisar and produced by Kashf Foundation. Mufti received her fourth nomination as a Best Television Writer for the series at the 21st Lux Style Awards.

== Publications ==
- Jurrat-e-Rindana (جرآت رندانہ)
- Ullu Baraye Farokht Nahi (الو براۓ فروخت نہیں)
- Aakhri Zaman (آخری زمانہ)
- Pani Mar Raha Hai (پانی مر رہا ہے)

== Screenwriting ==
=== Television ===
- Ek Hatheli Pe Hina Ek Hatheli Pe Lahoo (2011)
- Jahez (2012)
- Sabz Pari Laal Kabootar (2012)
- Maya (2012–14)
- Ullu Baraye Farokht Nahi (2013)
- Dil Muhallay Ki Haveli (2014)
- Rukhsati (2014)
- Izteraab (2014)
- Haq Meher (2014–15)
- Neelam Kinaray (2015)
- Jugnoo (2015)
- Mol (2015)
- Farwa Ki ABC (2015)
- Preet Na Kariyo Koi (2015–16)
- Jab Tak Ishq Nahi Hota (2016)
- Ghughi (2018)
- Aakhri Station (2018)
- Zun Mureed (2018)
- Dil Na Umeed To Nahi (2021)
- Khushbo Mein Basay Khat (2023)
- Ek Jhooti Kahani (2025)

=== Film ===
- Khaemae Mein Matt Jhankain

== Awards ==
=== Lux Style Awards ===
Year	Category	Project	Result	Ref.
2013	Best Television Writer	Jahez	Nominated	
2014	Best Television Writer	Ullu Baraye Farokht Nahi	Won	
2019	Best Television Writer	Ghughi	Nominated	
2022	Best Television Writer	Dil Na Umeed To Nahi	Nominated	

=== Other accolades ===
- 2006—PEN Award for Best Debut
