= Carma (film) =

2022 Pakistani film

- Theatrical release poster
- کارما
- Directed by: Kashan Admani
- Written by: Fawad Hai
- Screenplay by: Fawad Hai
- Story by: Fawad Hai
- Produced by: Kashan Admani; Fawad Hai
- Starring: Adnan Siddiqui; Naveen Waqar; Zhalay Sarhadi; Osama Tahir; Lili Caseley; Paras Masroor; Arjumand Rahim; Vajdaan Shah; Khaled Anam; Umer Aalam
- Cinematography: Farhan Golden
- Music by: Kashan Admani
- Production company: Dream Station Productions
- Distributed by: Eveready Pictures
- Release date: 2 September 2022
- Running time: 109 minutes
- Country: Pakistan
- Languages: Urdu; English

Carma - The Movie is a 2022 Pakistani crime-thriller film directed by Kashan Admani (in his directorial debut) and written by Fawad Hai. Carma is co-produced by Kashan Admani and Fawad Hai. The movie stars Adnan Siddiqui, Zhalay Sarhadi, Naveen Waqar, and Osama Tahir in lead roles. The film is inspired by the works of Quentin Tarantino. The movie was released on 2 September 2022, after being premiered for the media and film fraternity on 1 September 2022.

== Plot ==
A man is kidnapped and held hostage in his car by 3 members of a dangerous gang, led by the vicious psychopath Sasha, played by Zhalay Sarhadi. But what appears to be a straightforward kidnapping turns out to be an intricate tale of deception, vengeance and retribution. Each progressive scene during the kidnapping is linked with an impactful scene from the past, producing a cohesive story that ends with a series of twists. Carma's screenplay covers 50 scenes shot entirely in and around cars. The movie's name is a combination of Karma and cars.

The trailer of the movie was launched in an event in Karachi that was attended by the entire cast of the movie and the media. The inspiration of the film is drawn by the works of acclaimed Hollywood director Quentin Tarantino and is based on themes of revenge, murder and betrayal.

== Cast ==
- Adnan Siddiqui as Ali Khan
- Zhalay Sarhadi as Sasha
- Naveen Waqar as Maria Shah and Hamza/Haroon's wife
- Osama Tahir as Hamza/Haroon
- Paras Masroor as Hashmat
- Arjumand Rahim as Haya Ali Khan
- Umer Aalam as Jamal
- Vajdaan Shah as Abdul
- Khaled Anam as Shah
- Lili Caseley as Lili

- Carma The Movie Official Trailer
- Official trailer on YouTube

== Production ==
The film was shot in Karachi and London. Production was completed in Kashan Admani's production facility, Dream Station Productions.

== Soundtracks ==
The music of the movie is composed by Kashan Admani, who is also the director and producer of the film. The lyrics have been penned down by Lili Caseley, and Kashan Admani.

The movie features several songs. Khamoshiyan sung by Asad Rasheed of Mizmaar, Banda sung by Chand Tara Orchestra, It's You by Lili Caseley. The theme song of the movie was composed by Kashan Admani himself. The movie also features Tere Rung, performed by the lead singer of the band Fuzön, Charkha sung by Mahnoor, and Ek Parinda by Asad Rasheed.

No	Title	Singer	Length
1	"Khamoshiyan"	Kashan Admani ft. Asad Rasheed	3:37
2	"It's You"	Kashan Admani ft. Lili Caseley	3:07
3	"Banda"	Chand Tara Orchestra	2:43
4	"Carma - Theme Song"	Kashan Admani	2:32
5	"Tere Rung"	Kashan Admani ft. Khurram Iqbal	3:09
6	"Charkha"	Kashan Admani ft. Mahnoor	4:46
7	"Ek Parinda"	Kashan Admani ft. Asad Rasheed	3:47
8	"Be Nishan"	Kashan Admani ft. Bilal Ali (Kashmir (Pakistani band))	3:51

== Hollywood ==
Carma - The Movie has been picked by the Hollywood distribution company Porter & Craig film & distribution company for a U.S. and global release. The film is expected to release in the US later this year. The date has not been announced yet.

== Projection ==
=== Critical reception ===
Carma received mostly positive reviews from critics. Express Tribune rates the film 9 out of 10 and wrote "Kashan Admani's ‘Tarentino-inspired’ film was a herculean undertaking and it shows". Something Haute terms Carma as a groundbreaking movie that is shot in and around cars. Dawn has served mixed reviews about the movie writes, "Carma is an engaging thriller where we see bad things happen to very bad people. When you think about this in karmic context, there is some fun in seeing bad people get what they deserve."
