= Khafa Khafa Zindagi =

Pakistani television series

- Genre: Social drama Family drama Love Story
- Written by: Kifayat Rodani
- Directed by: Asim Ali
- Starring: Sumbul Iqbal; Ali Safina
- Composer: Shuja Haider
- Country of origin: Pakistan
- Original language: Urdu
- No. of seasons: 1
- No. of episodes: 24

Production
- Producer: Sadia Jabbar
- Running time: Approx 40 Minutes

Original release
- Network: A-Plus TV
- Release: 23 August 2018 – 13 August 2019

Khafa Khafa Zindagi is 2018 Pakistani family drama television series produced by Sadia Jabbar under Sadia Jabbar Production. The series focuses on the trials and tribulations of a married couple played by Ali Safina and Sumbal Iqbal along with Shagufta Ejaz, Dua Malik and Aiza Awan in pivotal roles. It was first aired 29 August 2018 on A-Plus TV.

== Plot ==
This a story about broken family of the spouses Sara and Bilal. They have two children and their marriage is coming to an end. Sara is a very selfish woman with an even more selfish mother, who breaks up her marriage. Sara gives up on her loving husband and two kids on the insistence of her greedy mother.

== Cast ==
- Ali Safina as Bilal
- Sumbal Iqbal as Sara
- Shagufta Ejaz as Sara's Mother
- Dua Malik as Amber; Bilal's sister
- Aiza Awan as Afroz; Sara's sister
- Sohail Asghar as Sara's Father
- Farah Ali as Sara's elder sister
- Azra Mohyeddin as Bilal's Mother
- Shazia Qaiser as Gulzar's aunt; Sara's sister
- Hassan Niazi as Abid; Bilal's friend and Sara's office colleague
- Maryam Tiwana as Raimeen; Abid's ex-wife
- Anas Yaseen as Gulzar (child); Bilal and Sara's son
- Ibrahim as Khriat (child); Bilal and Sara's daughter

== Soundtrack ==
Khafa Khafa Zindagi OST

Soundtrack album by Shuja Haider
- Released: 2 August 2018
- Recorded: 2018
- Genre: Television soundtrack
- Length: (4:22)
- Language: Urdu
- Label: A-Plus TV

Music video
- "Khafa Khafa Zindagi " OST on YouTube
