= Farwa Ki ABC =

Pakistani drama series

- Title screen
- Genre: Family drama Romance; Comedy
- Written by: Amna Mufti
- Directed by: Sohail Javed
- Starring: Sonya Hussain; Adnan Jaffar; Ahmed Hassan
- Opening theme: Singer: Siddharth Mahadevan
- Composers: Farukh Abdi & Shoaib Farukh
- Country of origin: Pakistan
- Original language: Urdu

Production
- Producer: Sadia Jabbar
- Running time: 30–45 minutes
- Production company: Sadia Jabbar Productions

Original release
- Network: A-Plus Entertainment
- Release: 24 July – 18 December 2015

Farwa Ki ABC is a 2015 Pakistani romantic-comedy series that originally aired on A-Plus Entertainment from 24 July 2015 to 18 December 2015. It is produced by Sadia Jabbar under Sadia Jabbar Productions and stars Sonya Hussain, Adnan Jaffar and Ahmed Hassan in pivotal roles. The series is about Farwa who decides to marry one of the guy of her choice to avoid studies as she is weak in English.

== Plot ==
Farwa, a university student, struggles with her English compartment and faces tension when her genius cousin Aasma suggests hiring tutor Sir Mustansar. To avoid Mustansar, Farwa teams up with Jogi, and they fake a mental disorder certificate. Meanwhile, Junaid's family moves in, and his mother considers Farwa as a potential match for his son. However, Junaid's controlling behavior and constant mentions of Aasma frustrate Farwa.

Aasma reveals a shocking secret: Junaid was infatuated with her in college. On the engagement day, Junaid elopes with Aasma, while Farwa marries Mustansar to escape her studies and arranged marriage. However, Mustansar discovers Farwa's true intentions and becomes enraged.

Aasma notices flaws in her new home and decides to rebuild. She discovers Farwa's fake mental health certificate and confronts her, leading to a rift between the two families. Tanveer is accused of assisting Farwa, but Junaid's father clears his name.

Mustansar suggests a fresh start with Farwa, hoping to resolve their issues. As the complex web of relationships and deceptions unfolds, everyone realizes that Farwa is being blamed unfairly. Aasma and Junaid leave for their honeymoon, and Mustansar discovers that Farwa married him on Jogi's advice as part of their plan.

Mustansar decides to support Farwa's decision to marry Jogi after their divorce and makes Farwa's parents aware of their mistake. He hires Silky, the younger sister of his ex-beloved Surayya, as a tutor for Jogi to refine his rough edges and make him a suitable match for Farwa's respectable family.

As Silky tutors Jogi, she develops feelings for him. Meanwhile, Farwa paints a negative picture of Mustansar to her parents and conspires with Jogi to marry him to Surayya. However, Silky notices Jogi's excessive efforts and advises him to ensure Farwa's love is genuine. Upon investigation, Jogi discovers that Farwa's feelings for him are not authentic.

Farwa's parents discover Jogi's true nature and forbid her from marrying him. Farwa tries to reconcile with Jogi, but he makes her understand that they don't truly love each other. This realization helps Farwa see Mustansar's affection and selfless love for her, and she returns to his house.

In the end, all the couples, including Farwa's parents and Junaid's parents, go on a picnic together, finally finding happiness and resolution.

== Cast ==
- Sonya Hussain as Farwa Saeed
- Adnan Jaffar as Mustansar, Farwa's English teacher
- Ahmed Hassan as Jahangir "Gogi"
- Khalid Anam as Saeed, Farwa's Father
- Irsa Ghazal as Begum Saeed, Farwa's mother
- Yasir Mazhar as Junaid
- Sabiha Hashmi as Junaid's mother
- Shehryar Zaidi as Junaid's father
- Faryal Mehmood as Aasma
- Ayesha Toor as Surayya Anjum
- Pari Hashmi as Saulat "Silky" Jahan

== Production ==
The series' writer Amna Mufti drew inspiration from a personal anecdote and discussed it with Noorul Huda Shah, the network's head of content, to craft the series' narrative.

== Critical reception ==
In an year-ender review by DAWN Images recognised Farwa Ki ABC for its brilliant writing by Amna Mufti, who cleverly wrapped comedy, social commentary, and a mirror for our times in a simple romantic comedy, earning her a Critics' Choice award for Best Writer, and noted Ahmed Hassan's impressive performance as Gogi, earning him an honorable mention for Best Supporting Actor.
