= Dil-e-Bereham =

Pakistani television series

- Title screen
- Also known as: Dil Hai Beraham
- دِلِ بے رحم
- Written by: Mansoor Saeed
- Directed by: Syed Ali Raza Usama
- Starring: Amar Khan; Wahaj Ali
- Opening theme: "Aag Lag Javegi" by Shuja Haider
- Ending theme: "Haan" by Shuja Haider
- Country of origin: Pakistan
- Original language: Urdu
- No. of seasons: 1
- No. of episodes: 16 (aired) 23 (total)

Production
- Producer: Sadia Jabbar
- Camera setup: Multi-camera setup
- Running time: 37-40 minutes
- Production company: Sadia Jabbar Production

Original release
- Network: A-Plus TV
- Release: 8 January – 26 April 2019

Dil-e-Bereham (Urdu: دِلِ بے رحم, lit. 'The Pitiless Heart') is a 2019 Pakistani romantic drama series, produced by Sadia Jabbar under their banner Sadia Jabbar Productions. The drama airs weekly episode on A-Plus TV every Tuesday. It stars Amar Khan, Wahaj Ali and Maryam Nafees. The show remains incomplete, as it was taken off the air abruptly by the network on 26 April 2019 with only 16 episodes aired.

== Synopsis ==
The series explores the lives of two opposite persons who belong to two different worlds but fall in love with each other. Ayeza has been sent to Tabish's house to get revenge from the family. However, fate has other plans for them which creates havoc in their lives.

== Cast ==
- Wahaj Ali as Tabish
- Amar Khan as Ayeza
- Mariyam Nafees as Aleena
- Faraz Farooqui as Sheheryar
- Tabbasum Arif as Sheheryar's mother
- Hina Khawaja Bayat
- Anam Tanveer as Nazia
- Samina Ahmad
- Irsa Ghazal
- Behroze Sabzwari
- Hani Taha as Seemi
