= Laapata =

Pakistani television drama series

- Genre: Thriller; Romance
- Written by: Khizer Idrees
- Directed by: Khizer Idrees
- Country of origin: Pakistan
- Original language: Urdu
- No. of episodes: 22

Production
- Producer: Momina Duraid
- Editors: Jamal Latif; Kamran Hussain
- Camera setup: Multi-camera setup
- Production company: MD Productions

Original release
- Network: Hum TV
- Release: 28 July – 14 October 2021

Laapata (Urdu: لاپتہ, lit. 'Astray') is a 2021 Pakistani drama television series, produced by Momina Duraid under her banner MD Productions and directed by Khizer Idrees. It stars Ali Rehman Khan as a titular holder "Laapata" along with Sarah Khan and Ayeza Khan in leading roles.

== Plot ==
The story revolves around three characters of the same household; Falak, a badminton player (played by Sarah Khan), Geeti, a tiktoker (played by Ayeza Khan), and Shams a gambler and later a millworker (played by Ali Rehman Khan). Geeti and Falak are first cousins and Shams' family was taken in by them when they were children. Falak and Shams are deeply in love and consult their family for marriage, to which they agree. Meanwhile, Geeti and her friend Nasreen (played by Inaya Khan) are scheming and trying their best to get Geeti and Shams together. Geeti has feelings for Shams, but more than that it is her rivalry with Falak that has played a part in her pursuing Shams. Nevertheless, after many failed attempts at winning Shams over, Falak and Shams get engaged. Everything is going well until Shams gets caught in one of his gambling schemes. Shams became involved with a don in the gambling scene (who was also a cop) and was arrested after not being able to pay his dues from losing a bet. Through this illegal arrest, he was unrightfully sentenced for many years under terrorism instead for gambling. This was done by the same cop and gambler that Shams lost against (played by Saife Hassan). Shams was "Laapata" and nobody knew where he went.

After two years, after winning the badminton championship, Falak decided to get a job, where she meets Daniyal, her boss (played by Mirza Gohar Rasheed). Daniyal is interested in Falak and proposes to her to which she rejects. However, after slowly winning her over and after losing any hope of Shams' return, Daniyal and Falak get married in an intimate ceremony, after which they relocate to Islamabad, where Daniyal works and resides. After many spurs of weird behaviors from Daniyal it is revealed that he is mentally unwell and is seeing a therapist and takes medications to control his anger. Meanwhile, Geeti is making successful Tik Toks, but also falls in love with an online friend, only to get robbed of her mother's jewelry.

In Islamabad, during a party, Falak learns from some of Daniyal's friends that Daniyal was married before, but ended up divorced. Rumour has it that Daniyal actually murdered his ex-wife because he suspected that she was cheating on him and couldn't control his anger. In Karachi, after a visit to Shams' prison cell by survey cops, they discover that he was wrongfully sentenced by the same cop two years ago. This is discovered due to an ongoing investigation after the murder of the same cop that sentenced Shams for terrorism. Shams is immediately bailed and sent home. After two years, Shams returns home and is shocked and saddened to learn of Falak's marriage. After a confronting phone call from an upset Falak, Shams decides to move on and finds a job in a local factory as a millworker supervisor. Geeti asks her mother to get her engaged to Shams as now Falak has cleared her path. Her mother initially hesitates because of Shams' past but agrees and talks to Shams's parents. They also agreed and Shams and Geeti get engaged.

On the contrary, Falak has been overwhelmed by Daniyal's true character. She fights with Daniyal who in return turns really hyper and breaks Falak's phone. Upon finding a picture of Shams and Falak together, Daniyal slaps Falak across the face, to which she responds to by slapping him back. After a series of similar events, Daniyal is on the verge of killing Falak when their maid Munira hits him with a frypan and he faints. Falak was told that she had to trust Munira as she was the one who knew Daniyal's first wife and of her murder. The drama goes into a series of flashbacks and it is shown that Daniyal had married a Pakhtoon woman named Aliya (played by Momina Iqbal) whose father had captured the lands of Daniyal's father. Despite the family rivalry and differences, Daniyal and Aliya marry with the help of Aliya's brother as her father would obviously disapprove. They live happily. Daniyal orders Aliya not to meet her relatives until they migrate to America. She accepts. One day Aliya told Munira to return to her home (and she did) and behind her back she invites a man whom Munira has never seen. This happened everyday until one day Munira calls Daniyal and tells him that Aliya has been cheating on him. Daniyal then comes home, catches her, and shoots her on the spot. She instantly dies. It is revealed that the boy was none other than her own brother who helped her in marriage. Her brother told Daniyal that after their marriage, Aliya's father had died and he was here to inherit the lands to Aliya's name. Daniyal is shocked and Aliya's brother calls the police so Daniyal shoots him too. He tells Munira not to tell anyone about their murders.

The scene comes to the present and Falak is living in Munira's house. The next morning, after tracking down Falak, Daniyal comes to Munira's house. During an altercation, Falak takes a steel jug and attacks Daniyal on the same spot where he was hit with a frying pan. Falak flees to her home in Karachi and Munira and her husband leave Daniyal. It was later revealed to Falak that Daniyal died due to her attack, which comes to her as a huge shock. Meanwhile, Shams and Geeti are engaged. Falak comes just before the engagement and Shams becomes very happy to see her again. But, Geeti doesn't like it. Falak lies to her family about everything and says that she and Daniyal are going to America, so she is living here for a while and after which she will flee to America. Geeti senses that Falak and Shams are hitting it off again, and so she does some digging. She finds out that Daniyal is dead and that Falak is the murderer. She secretly calls the police and on the day of the wedding, the police come to arrest Falak for murdering Daniyal. The wedding is called off. Daniyal's friend's wife, a lawyer, helps Falak in her case as she was being held accountable as a murderer and was even sent to a male prison. Through a few court trials and after losing hope Shams doesn't know what to do. Geeti is scheming in every which way that she can to win over Shams, but upon discovering what she did, he vows to never marry her, even is Falak is sentenced to death. Geeti has a mental breakdown and can't believe that she has truly lost. Eventually, Falak is set free with the help of her lawyer and returns home. Falak and Shams finally get married. The drama ended with an iconic scene where Geeti was seen weeping of her demise and not finding love. At the last second, it's revealed that she is in fact acting in her first lead role.

== Cast ==
- Ali Rehman Khan as Shams
- Sarah Khan as Falak
- Ayeza Khan as Geeti
- Gohar Rasheed as Daniyal
- Asma Abbas as Samina, Geeti's Mother
- Rabia Noreen as Nighat, Falak's mother
- Khalifa Sajeeruddin as Khursheed, Falak's father
- Amna Malik as Faryal, Falak's sister
- Munazzah Arif as Rukhsana; Shams's mother
- Akbar Islam as Hameed, Shams's father
- Saife Hassan as Inspector Tahir
- Inaya Khan as Nasreen, Geeti's friend
- Kasim Khan as Shahid, Nasreen's husband
- Fahima Awan as Rehana, Sohail's sister and Faryal's sister-in-law
- Raza Ali Abid as Raju, Shams's former friend
- Qaiser Khan Nizamani as Karim, Daniyal's father
- Amber Khan as Mrs. Karim, Daniyal's mother
- Momina Iqbal as Aliya, Daniyal's former wife (cameo)
- Sarmad Khoosat as television director (cameo)
- Raeed Muhammad Alam as Geeti's imaginary boyfriend (cameo)

== Reception ==
=== TV ratings ===
The 20th episode of the show received 5.3 TV ratings and the last episode ended on 7.5 rating points in the 50-minute time band.

=== Critical reception ===
The series was criticized for some scenes (the "harassment accusation" scene in episode 1) and for the iconic slap scene between Falak and Daniyal. In an article by Jasir Shahbaz of The Friday Times, he acknowledges that some viewers praised the series scene of Falak slapping her husband back as a break from the usual portrayal of women as passive victims, but he doesn't endorse violence as empowerment, and further argued that violence is not the answer. However, after a few episodes when the harassment scene was cleared up by Geeti's character, it was actually praised for its positive messaging. On its premiere, it received mixed reviews due to the storyline going in too many directions but was heavily praised for its direction. A reviewer from MERA FM 107.4 criticized the "poor and cliched" storyline and Ayeza Khan's acting, calling her character "problematic", and expressed concern over the drama's portrayal of harassment allegations.

== Soundtrack ==
"Laapata"

Song by Kiran Waseen & Tehseen W. Chishty
- Language: Urdu
- Released: 1 July 2021
- Genre: Soundtrack
- Length: 4:38
- Composer: Farhan Zameer
- Lyricist: Wardah Lodhi
- Producer: Momina Duraid

Official video
- Laapata - OST on YouTube

The official soundtrack of the serial was performed by Kiran Waseem and Tehseen W. Chishty on the lyrics of Wardah Lodhi. The music composition was done by Farhan Zameer. Beside the official soundtrack, the soundtracks of the channel's former serials such as "Aaj Rang Hai" of Ullu Baraye Farokht Nahi and "Khabar-e-tahayyur-e-ishq sun, na junoon raha na pari rahi" of Deewana were played in the background during the course of the episodes.

== Production ==
=== Background and development ===
After the success of the Ramadan special play Chupke Chupke, Ayeza Khan revealed that she would be starring in another serial alongside Sarah Khan, Ali Rehman Khan, and Gohar Rasheed. Khizar Idrees, who previously served as a cinematographer of the 2017 film Verna and the production house's dramas Sang-e-Mar Mar and Aangan, was chosen to direct the series and also wrote the story of the series.

=== Production locations ===
Besides a few episodes which were shot in Islamabad, the shooting was mostly done in Karachi.

== Tributes ==
For her role as a TikToker who creates musical videos, Ayeza Khan underwent several transformations, paying tribute to iconic celebrities. These tributes included recreating Madhuri Dixit's look from "Ek Do Teen", Sridevi's look from "Tere Mere Honton Pe" in Chandni, and Noor Jehan's signature style. She also emulated Mahira Khan's look from Superstar and Kajol's character Anjali from Kuch Kuch Hota Hai.
