= Heer Da Hero =

2023 Pakistani televisions series

- Title screen
- Genre: Comedy; Family
- Written by: Amar Khan
- Directed by: Saima Waseem
- Starring: Imran Ashraf; Amar Khan
- Country of origin: Pakistan
- Original languages: Punjabi, Urdu
- No. of episodes: 33

Production
- Producers: Abdullah Kadwani; Asad Qureshi
- Production company: 7th Sky Entertainment

Original release
- Network: Geo Entertainment
- Release: 23 March – 24 April 2023

Heer Da Hero (lit. 'The Hero of the Heer') is a 2023 Pakistani television series, directed by Saima Waseem. It was produced by Abdullah Kadwani and Asad Qureshi under their banner 7th Sky Entertainment. It premiered on 23 March 2023 on Geo Entertainment. It stars Imran Ashraf and Amar Khan in lead roles.

== Premise ==
Two Punjabi families, the Butts and the Jutts, are opposed in a political struggle, despite romantic involvement between two of their members.

== Cast ==
- Imran Ashraf as Hero Butt
- Amar Khan as Heer Jutt
- Munazzah Arif
- Waseem Abbas
- Kinza Malik
- Usman Peerzada Inayat Jutt
- Kashif Mehmood as Hameed Jutt
- Afzal Khan as Rasheed Jutt
- Ismat Iqbal
- Naseem Vicky as Teeli
- Rahim Pardesi
- Ahsan Afzal Khan as Bubbly

== Production ==
The series was previously titled Janjalpura.

== Reception ==
A reviewer for Dawn, wrote that "a strong cast and direction pull the story together, keeping it entertaining without going over the edge." It added: "Like most Ramazan shows, the supporting cast of quirky but lovable personalities are essential to the spirit of the show.(..) Despite the simple setting, efforts have been made to keep up the production values, and the wardrobe and lighting giving us a very watchable show." Another reviewer, for Youlin, wrote, "Heer da Hero (was) yet another romantic comedy, aired on Geo TV is written by Amar Khan, directed by Saima Waseem, and produced by Abdullah Kadwani and Asadullah Qureshi. Anyone who has seen last year’s Chaudhry and sons, won’t find anything different in the ongoing drama because it has the same director, actors and is being shown on the same channel. It is disappointing to see Imran making almost no effort in changing his mannerisms and acting."
