= Ghughi =

2018 Pakistani television drama serial

- Genre: Period drama
- Created by
- Written by: Amna Mufti
- Story by: Shahzad Javed
- Directed by: Iqbal Hussain
- Starring: Adnan Siddiqui; Amar Khan
- Country of origin: Pakistan
- Original language: Urdu
- No. of seasons: 1
- No. of episodes: 29

Production
- Producers: Adnan Siddiqui; Akhtar Hasnain
- Running time: 35 minutes
- Production company: Cereal Entertainment

Original release
- Release: 25 January – 9 August 2018

Ghughi (Punjabi: گُھگِھّی, lit. 'Dove') is a 2018 Pakistani drama serial based on Amrita Pritam's 1950 novel Pinjar. It is directed by Iqbal Hussain, written by Amna Mufti and produced by Cereal Entertainment. It originally aired on TV One Pakistan. It stars Adnan Siddiqui as Rasheed and Amar Khan as Nirmala in lead roles.

== Plot ==
Ghughi is a story of passionate love and overpowering hate—set against the violent, bloody upheaval of Partition. A beautiful and young Hindu girl Nirmala whose family came to their ancestral village Malikwal in Gujranwala District of Punjab from Jalandhar is kidnapped the night before her wedding by Rasheed, a young Muslim man from Sandhewal, to avenge his family's honour. Nirmala's family is devastated and to atone for this mishap they marry off her younger sister Nikki to Nirmala's fiancée Takh Chand who was from Sodhiwal. While Nikki and Takh Chand are distressed on their forced marriage, its Nirmala who faces isolation and extreme hatred of Rasheed's family.

== Cast ==
- Adnan Siddiqui as Rasheed a.k.a. Sheeda
- Amar Khan as Nirmala a.k.a. Nimmo, after Forced Conversion into Islam - Fatima.
- Mohsin Gillani as Deewan Chand
- Asma Abbas as Parwati
- Haris Waheed as Sukh Chand
- Khalid Butt as Lal Chand
- Tahira Imam as Nadini
- Hamza Firdous as Tek Chand
- Raheela Agha as Majid's wife Bhabo
- Ahmad Mohsin as Bashir
- Muhammad Umar Khan as Raja Jee
- Farah Tufail as Inayat Bibi
- Yasmeen Hashmi as Shakuntala aka Nikki
- Hamna Amir as Choti
- Rashid Mehmood as Sajjad
- Umer Darr
- Ahmed Mohsin as Akrama

== Accolades ==
Year	Award	Category	Nominee(s)	Result
2018	18th Lux Style Awards	Best TV Writer	Amna Mufti	Nominated
2018	18th Lux Style Awards	Best Original Soundtrack	Naveed Nashad & Beena Khan	Nominated
