= Shameless Proposals =

- Written by: Saji Gul
- Directed by: Hunny Haroon
- Country of origin: Pakistan
- Original language: Urdu

Production
- Producer: Sadia Jabbar
- Camera setup: Multi-camera setup
- Production company: Sadia Jabbar Production

Original release
- Release: 29 March 2019

Shameless Proposals is a 2019 Pakistani anthology web series, produced by Sadia Jabbar under their banner Sadia Jabbar Production and written by Saji Gul. The first episode of the series aired online on 29 March 2019. It became the second web series launched in Pakistan since Wajahat Rauf's Enaaya released earlier that year.

== Premise ==
Episode	Title	Airing date	Refs
1	Say No To Physical Violence	29 March 2019	
2	Tharki	5 April 2019	
3	Mama's Boy	12 April 2019	
4	Foreign Rishta	19 April 2019	
5	Sweety	3 May 2019	
6	Blood Sucking Rishta	10 May 2019	
7	Progressive Pakistani Mard	26 May 2019	
