= Qayamat (TV series) =

Pakistani melodrama televisions series

- Title Card
- Genre: Melodrama; Suspense; Thriller
- Written by: Sarwat Nazir
- Directed by: Ali Faizan
- Starring: Neelam Muneer; Ahsan Khan; Amar Khan; Haroon Shahid
- Country of origin: Pakistan
- Original language: Urdu
- No. of episodes: 47

Production
- Producers: Abdullah Kadwani; Asad Qureshi (Producer)
- Running time: 37 minutes approx.
- Production company: 7th Sky Entertainment

Original release
- Network: Geo Entertainment
- Release: 5 January – 16 June 2021

Qayamat (Urdu: قیامت, lit. 'Catastrophe') is a 2021 Pakistani television series, directed by Ali Faizan Anchan and written by Sarwat Nazir for 7th Sky Entertainment, owned by Abdullah Kadwani and Asad Qureshi. It premiered on 5 January 2021 on Geo TV, every Tuesday and Wednesday.

== Plot ==
"Qayamat is the story of a young and beautiful girl whose life decisions are dominated by those around her. Eventually, all hell breaks loose when the people closest to her repeatedly make the same mistake, making her future bleak.

Ifrah, along with her parents and elder sister Samra, belongs to the lower middle class and believes in hard work and honesty. Samrah is in love with her friend's brother Saad. Their marriage has also been fixed. But, on informing their wealthy uncle Mukhtar, he asks them to break off that marriage and to give Samrah hand for his elder son Rashid Mukhtar (no one is willing to marry Rashid as he not only failed in eighth grade, he doesn't have a great reputation). Ifrah and Samrah's parents first refuse Mukhtar, but he threatens them and tells them that he will take back their house and their shop (it is all in his name). On hearing this, Samrah, though reluctant, agrees to the wedding, willing to sacrifice her happiness for her family.

Meanwhile, Rashid's brother Jawad, comes back from Canada. He and Ifrah fall in love with each other, and their marriage is also fixed.

After their marriage, Samrah faces mistreatment from Rashid.Rashid often beats up Samra by gaining the support of his mother, Nargis.(Nargis wanted a richer daughter-in-law). She gets pregnant with his child, but their treatment towards her doesn't improve. He continues to beat her up . One day, when Rashid and Samrah argue over his mistress Pari, he pushes her, and she falls. She is rushed to the hospital, where she dies after giving birth to their daughter, who is named Sana. While all this is happening, Rashid is spending time with his mistress Pari, whom he accidentally shoots while fighting over her with her other boyfriend. No one knew that Rashid killed Samra.

Rashid's family decides to get him married to Ifrah. Ifrah disagrees. Jawad sees that his niece needs a mother and begs her to marry his brother. Jawad sacrifices his love, and eventually, Ifrah agrees. Ifrah's parents repeat their mistake of marrying off their daughter to Rashid, who is known to have subjected their eldest daughter to frequent domestic abuse. For Sana Rashid starts to develop feelings for Ifrah.After some time, Afiya also dies.Knowing the main culprit behind her sister's demise, Ifrah decides that if she's destined to marry Samra's abuser, then there must be vengeance.

== Cast ==
=== Main cast ===
- Ahsan Khan as Rashid Mukhtar : Ifrah's husband, Samra's former husband, and Sana's father (main antagonist)
- Neelam Muneer as Ifrah Rashid Mukhtar: Rashid's second wife, Samra's younger sister, and Sana's adoptive mother (main protagonist)
- Amar Khan as Samra Rashid Mukhtar, Ifrah's elder sister, Sana's mother, and Rashid's first wife, accidentally killed by Rashid (Extended Special Appearance)
- Haroon Shahid as Jawad Mukhtar; Rashid's younger brother and Ifrah's ex-fiancee

=== Supporting cast ===
- Saba Faisal as Nargis Mukhtar; Rashid & Jawad's mother, Mukhtar's wife (main antagonist)
- Shabbir Jan as Mukhtar; Rashid & Jawad's father, Fayaz's Brother, Nargis's Husband (Antagonist turned protagonist)
- Noor ul Hassan as Fayaz; Samra & Ifrah's father, Mukhtar's Younger Brother, Afiyah's Husband
- Kinza Malik as Afiyah Fayaz; Samra & Ifrah's mother, Fayaz's wife
- Zainab Qayyum as Nadra; Rashid and Jawad's aunt & Nargis' sister. Nargis's partner in crime too.

=== Recurring cast ===
- Sidra Niazi as Urooj, Nadra's niece, Fayaz's second wife
- Sana Fakhar as Pari; Rashid's girlfriend
- Mizna Waqas as Saira; Saad's sister, Samra's best friend
- Haris Waheed as Saad : Samra's ex lover, Saira's brother
- Mubasira Khanam as Saad & Saira's mother
- Afshan Qureshi as Pari's mother
- Faiza Gillani as Parween; Fayyaz's devious servant
- Zuhab Khan as Shahid; Parween's brother, disguised as her son
- Hareem Hammad as Sana Rashid Mukhtar; Rashid and Samra's daughter, Ifrah's niece & half-daughter(child actress)
- Birjees Farooqui as Amma; A school's principle
- Salma Qadir as Aunt Batool; a matchmaker
- Sohail Masood as Uncle Shakirullah; Fayaz's friend
- Ayat Arif as Mariya; Urooj's daughter (child actress)

== Production ==
It marked fourth on-screen appearance of Ahsan Khan with Neelum Muneer after Kaise Huaye Benaam, Kaisi Khushi Le Ke Aya Chand and their 2017's hit film Chupan Chupai while Noor-ul-Hassan and Kinza Malik as their sixth on-screen together appearance on TV after Sammi, Alif Allah Aur Insaan, Dar Si Jaati Hai Sila, Lashkara and Inkaar.
