= Dil Na Umeed To Nahi =

- دل نااُمید تو نہیں
- Genre: Drama
- Written by: Amna Mufti
- Directed by: Kashif Nisar
- Starring: Yumna Zaidi; Wahaj Ali; Fajar Khan
- Ending theme: "Mera Rasta Taake hai Jb Sapne" by Roshaneh Zafar, composed by Sami Khan
- Composer: Sami Khan
- Country of origin: Pakistan
- Original language: Urdu
- No. of episodes: 24

Production
- Producers: Kashf Foundation; TV One
- Running time: 36-40 minutes approx.

Original release
- Network: TV One; PTV Home
- Release: 18 January – 26 July 2021

Dil Na Umeed To Nahi (Urdu: دل نااُمید تو نہیں, lit. 'The heart hasn't lost hope') is a Pakistani social drama television series produced by Kashf Foundation, directed by Kashif Nisar and written by Amna Mufti. It features Yumna Zaidi, Wahaj Ali, Fajar Khan, Bonita Malik, Muhammad Sadoon and Isbah Irfan in leading roles. The story focuses on several social evils including child marriages, child labour, human trafficking/sex trafficking and prostitution. The story revolves around three individuals, Allah Rakhi, Jamshaid and Naseem Zehra who face these problems.

In February 2021, the series received a notice from Pakistan Electronic Media Regulatory Authority (PEMRA) for allegedly violating the censorship code. The series won rave reviews from the critics and audience for its unique storyline and great acting performances. At the 21st Lux Style Awards, the series received five nominations and won Best Ensemble Play.

== Plot ==
Allah Rakhi (Yumna Zaidi) is a young girl who lives in a village with her family but due to extreme poverty, her family gets her married to a much older man who sells her off as a prostitute to a brothel where she is renamed Sumbul.

Jamshaid (Wahaj Ali) is a neighbor and friend of Allah Rakhi who leaves his home after facing physical violence from his mother and from his teacher in school. He runs to the city where he gets entangled in human trafficking and faces many hurdles including child labour.

Naseem Zehra (Fajar Khan) is a headstrong and confident girl who dreams of becoming a cricketer and winning the world cup for her country. Due to her father's stereotypical thoughts that girls cannot play cricket (which are put in his mind by his neighbor Naeem Sherwani who has impure thoughts towards Naseem) she struggles to achieve her dreams and nearly becomes a victim of human trafficking.

Years later fate intervenes, Allah Rakhi and Jamshaid cross paths with each other as full grown adults. Allah Rakhi runs away from the brothel and finds place in 'Big Brother' shelter home where Jamashaid works to help such women. At first both don't recognize each other but then some series of hints make Jamashaid recognize her as his long-lost childhood friend who used to live in the same village with him.

== Cast ==
- Yumna Zaidi as Allah Rakhi aka Sumbul
  - Bonita Malik as young Allah Rakhi
- Wahaj Ali as Jamshaid (Jimmy)
  - Muhammad Sadoon Ali as young Jamshaid
- Fajar Khan as Naseem Zehra
  - Hamna Aamir as young Naseem
- Momina Aayla Chaudhry as Hijab Zahra
- Yasra Rizvi as Savera
- Nauman Ijaz as T.M
- Omair Rana as Zulfi
- Usman chaudhary as Imdad
- Samiya Mumtaz as Najma
- Navid Shahzad as Suraiya Anjum
- Adnan Shah Tipu as Ikram
- Noor ul Hassan as Qazi Jaleel
- Kashif Mehmood as Naeem Sherwani
- Faiz Chuhan as Majeed, Allah Rakhi's father
- Saima Saleem as Razia, Allah Rakhi's mother
- Ismat Iqbal as Allah Rakhi's grandmother
- Saba Bukhari as Sadia
- Nadia Afgan as Batool aka Batoolaan
- Raheela Agha as Malkani Ji
- Seemi Raheel as Zulfi's mother
- Haseeb Muhammad Bin Qasim as Doctor
- Iftikhar Iffi as Baba Ranjha

== Production ==
In January 2020, it reported that Yumna Zaid is starring in a caused-based serial, directed by Kashif Nisar, written by Amna Mufi and produced by Kashf Foundation. The principal photography of the series began in late 2019 in Lahore but was halted in March 2020 due to the COVID-19 pandemic. The shooting then resumed in October 2020. The serial was rejected by three mainstream channels in the country and consequently aired on TV One and PTV Home on 18 January 2021. The series's broadcast was postponed during the month of Ramadan. The writer stated in an interview that story of the series is inspired by her novel Yeh Bhi Aik Kahani Hai.

== Reception ==
Sadaf Hiader of DAWN Images praised the sensitive portrayal of the subject and performances of the actors including Zaidi, Rizvi, Shehzad, Rana and particularly the child actors. The News International praised the women portrayal and empathetic treatment of the characters, especially women.

== Awards and nominations ==
Year	Awards	Category	Recipient(s)/ nominee(s)	Result	Ref.
November 24, 2022	Lux Style Awards	Best TV Director	Kashif Nisar	Nominated	
November 24, 2022	Lux Style Awards	Best TV Writer	Amna Mufti	Nominated	
November 24, 2022	Lux Style Awards	Best TV Actress-Viewers' Choice	Yumna Zaidi	Nominated	
November 24, 2022	Lux Style Awards	Best TV Actress-Critics' Choice	Yumna Zaidi	Nominated	
November 24, 2022	Lux Style Awards	Best Ensemble TV Play	Dil Na Umeed To Nahi	Won	

- It earned TV One its first LSA win.
