= Belapur Ki Dayan =

2018 Pakistani Television series

- Opening theme
- Urdu: بیلاپور کی ڈائن
- Genre: Horror drama Thriller; Mystery
- Created by: MD Productions
- Written by: Inam Hasan
- Directed by: Saife Hassan
- Starring: Adnan Siddiqui; Sarah Khan; Amar Khan; Osama Tahir; (See full cast)
- Opening theme: "Rehti Hain Unsuni Kahanian Kahein" by Faiza Mujahid
- Ending theme: "Rehti Hain Unsuni Kahanian Kahein" by Faiza Mujahid
- Composer: Muhammad Wasi-uddin
- Country of origin: Pakistan
- Original language: Urdu
- No. of seasons: 1
- No. of episodes: 20

Production
- Producer: Momina Duraid
- Production locations: Karachi, Pakistan
- Cinematography: Azhar Ali
- Editor: Vishwanand More
- Camera setup: Multi-camera setup
- Running time: 34 minutes
- Production company: Momina Duraid Productions

Original release
- Network: Hum TV
- Release: 15 February – 28 June 2018

Belapur Ki Dayan (Urdu: بیلاپور کی ڈائن; transl. The Witch of Belapur) is a 2018 Pakistani supernatural horror drama series directed by Saife Hassan and written by Inam Hasan. It features Sarah Khan, Adnan Siddiqui and Osama Tahir in leads, while Amar Khan played the main antagonist. The series first premiered on 15 February 2018 on Hum TV.

== Synopsis ==
The story revolves around Shreyasi (Shakeel), who has recently moved to his ancestral home after winning a 32-year-long court battle with his stepbrother. In the house, his whole family is disturbed by a supernatural presence, which turns out to be the spirit of his stepsister Nilofar (Amar Khan). Nilofar wants to take revenge from him for wrongdoings in the past. Thus, she tortures and disturbs the lives of his family for living in her home. She corrupts the souls of Natasha, aka Tasha (Sarah Khan), the daughter of Aziz, and possesses her body to affect her life negatively. In the meantime, the lives of Aziz's son Rameez (Osama Tahir), his wife Aliya (Rayyan Ibrahim), son Wajdan (Nitesh Narayan), and daughter Mannat (Shifa) are deeply disturbed by the supernatural spirits, especially Nilofar. Aziz decides to tame Nilofar and seeks the help of her ex-lover Shakir (Adnan Siddiqui) for Tasha's treatment.

== Cast ==
- Adnan Siddiqui as Shakir
- Sarah Khan as Natasha aka Tasha
- Amar Khan as Neelofur/Dayan
- Osama Tahir as Rameez
- Shakeel as Aziz Ahmed (Old)
- Irfan Khoosat as Rehmat (Old)
- Rayyan Ibrahim as Aliya
- Ismat Zaidi as Salima
- Rashid Mehmood as Karamat (Dead)
- Sajida Syed as Raeesa
- Rashid Farooqui as Inspector Boota
- Akbar Islam as Sikander (Dead)
- Umar Naru as Rehmat (Young)
- Shahjahan Rana as Aziz (Young)
- Hira Soomro as Rabiya (Dead)
- Shifa as Mannat (Child star)
- Nitesh Narayan as Wajdan (Child star)
- Akhtar Ghazali as Wakil sahab (lawyer)

== Production ==
Amar, in an interview, said, "I’m playing characters from two different time periods, one of a fragile innocent girl of the 80’s reading Parveen Shakir’s shayari and the other, a current time period sarcastic and ruthless Dayan who is there to attain revenge."[ ... ]"It’s been given very realistic treatment. My director’s very much hanging me with cables in the air, and he’s making me do all these acrobats, so it’s no longer a bedroom drama where I shed a tear or two or even play a glamorous nagin; nothing of such sort."

While Adnan shared with The News International about his character, "I play the dayan’s love interest in the project,"[ ... ] "After her death, I am called in the same house by the owner whose daughter is being haunted, and I am there to save her. I will be seen in 10 episodes, and the drama takes you into flashbacks and then into the present."

== Awards ==
Year	Awards	Category	Recipient	Result	Ref(s)
2020	Hum Awards	Best Director Drama Serial	Saife Hassan	Nominated	
2020	Hum Awards	Best Writer Drama Serial	Inam Hassan	Nominated	
2020	Hum Awards	Best Drama Serial	Belapur Ki Dayan	Nominated	
2020	Hum Awards	Best Actor in a Leading Role	Adnan Siddiqui	Nominated	
2020	Hum Awards	Best Actress in a Leading Role	Sarah Khan	Nominated	
2020	Hum Awards	Best Actor in a Negative Role	Amar Khan	Nominated	
2020	Hum Awards	Best Actor in a leading Role	Osama Tahir	Nominated	
2019	Lux Style Awards	Best Emerging Talent	Amar Khan	Nominated	
