= Wadala Sandhuan =

Wadala Sandhuan وڈالہ سندہواں
- City Town
- Location in Pakistan
- Coordinates: 32°11′N 74°24′E
- Country: Pakistan
- Region: (Punjab, Pakistan) Punjab
- Tehsil: Daska
- District: Sialkot
- Union councils: 1 ( #72 ) Wadala Sandhuan
- Founder: Chaudhry Gaju Sandhu

Government
  - Chairman: CH Mohsin Karamat Meo
  - V-Chairman: CH Imran Rasool
- Elevation: 232 m (761 ft)

Population
  - Total: 82,835
- Demonym: Wadalwi
- Time zone: UTC+5 (PKT)
- Postal code: 51510
- Area code: 052

Wadala Sandhuan (Punjabi, Urdu: وڈالہ سندہواں) (Sandhuan also spelled Sandhwan or Sundhwan) is a historic town situated on the Gujranwala-Pasrur road in the Punjab province of Pakistan. Wadala Sandhuan was founded many centuries ago by Chaudhry Gaju Sandhu, a descendant of Chaudhry Mokhal Sandhu. Chaudhry Mokhal Sandhu had earlier established the nearby village of Mokhal Sandhuan, located a few miles away from Wadala Sandhuan.

Wadala Sandhuan is located at 32.11° North, 74.24° East. It is 232 meters (761 ft) above sea level and is nearly 18 km away from Gujranwala. This town belongs to Tehsil Daska and District Sialkot. The town's location on the Gujranwala-Pasrur road allows logistical connections to nearby cities such as Pasrur and Gujranwala. It is located between Gujranwala and Pasrur. The town is home to grain markets which provides jobs for thousands of people. There are over 30 rice mills located in the area from which Shahid Butt Brothers Rice mill is one of the major market contributor. A Wheat Flour Mill owned the same Butt Family (Hudaibiya Flour & General Mills) is making it one of the major wheat grain contributor to markets in the Punjab region. There are vast green fields and gardens around the town. It shares the borders with some small towns and villages such as Kotli Kheran, Gopipur, Rampur, Chakri, Jhang, Dherowali, Ramke etc. Punjabi and Mewati are the local language, but Urdu is also common, particularly in schools and offices. Lahore Sialkot Motorway M11 is passing through. It shall intersect 18 km Gujranwal Pasrur Road and an interchange will be near Hudaibeya Flour Mills which will link to Pasrur, Satrah, Mianwali Bangla, Siranwali, Wadala Sandhuan, Dahrmkot Chock, Talwandi Musa Khan Gujranwala and surroundings. This Mega project will enhance and improve the Business, Educational, and Social activities in Wadala Sandhuan and Surroundings.

== History ==
Historically, Wadala Sandhuan was the central settlement of a Sandhu Jat tract, forming an important seat of influence for the Sandhu clan in the region. Chaudhry Gaju Sandhu was a descendant of Chaudhry Mokhal Sandhu, who many centuries ago founded the village of Mokhal Sandhuan, located a few miles away from Wadala Sandhuan. Gaju Sandhu later went on to establish Wadala Sandhuan, further extending the family’s settlements and influence in the region.

During the Mughal period, Chaudhry Durga Mal Sandhu was the Chaudhry of Wadala and its surrounding villages. His family maintained this position of local authority for several generations. Later, during the period of Mughal decline, Sardar Mehtab Singh Sandhu rose to prominence. He took control of around 52 villages around Wadala and significantly expanded his influence. As his power grew in the mid-1700s, Mehtab Singh aligned himself with the Bhangi Misl, one of the strongest Misls led by influential Dhillon Jat sardars.The Bhangi Misl ruled large parts of Punjab during this period and even issued their own coinage.

The Sandhu sardars of Wadala were regarded as one of the chief families of District Sialkot and are also mentioned among the notable chiefs of Punjab in historical records.

During the partition of Punjab in 1947, the Sikh and Hindu populations of Wadala migrated to India. In the same period, Muslim Punjabi families from East Punjab moved to Wadala, along with Mewati-speaking refugee communities who settled in the area.

Wadala now is a diverse mix of Punjabi populations, including both native families and migrants from East Punjab, as well as Mewati refugee communities from India.

== Transportation ==
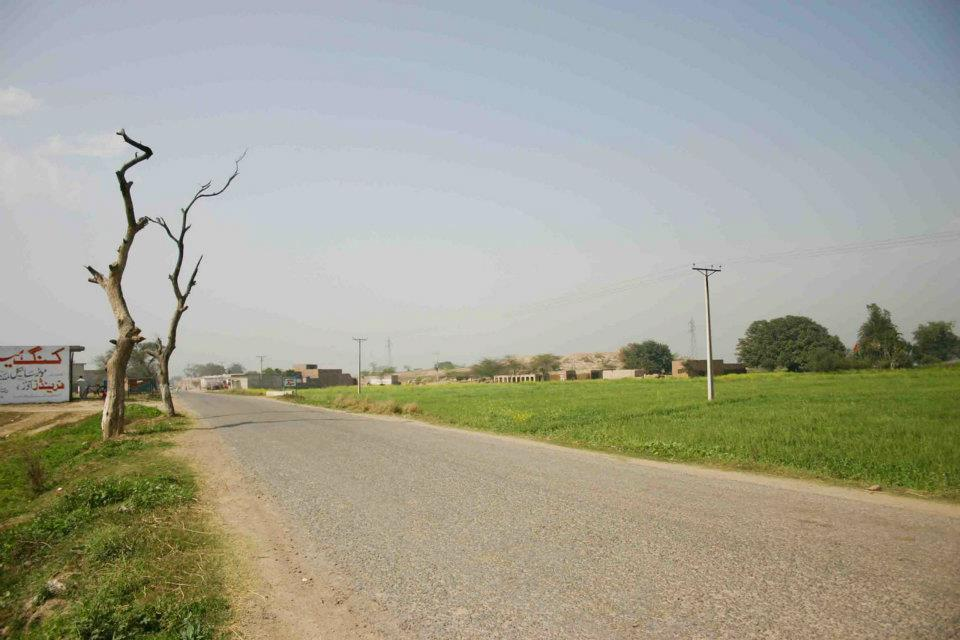
Gujranwala Pasrur Road passes through Wadala Sandhuan

Gujranwala-Pasrur road passes through the town and links it to many of the villages and town. By road, the town is less than one hours away from Gujranwala and Daska one hour drive from Sialkot. It is situated on the Gujranwala-Pasrur road which passes through the centre of the town. The nearest railway station is about 19 km away (Gujranwala railway station) this Railway Station was built by the British before the Independence of Pakistan and was one of the largest railway stations of the Asia. Sialkot International Airport is approximately 35 km away from Wadala Sandhuan. Lahore Sialkot Motorway M11 is passing through. It shall intersect 18 km Gujranwal Pasrur Road and an interchange will be near Hudaibeya Flour Mills which will link to Pasrur, Satrah, Mianwali Bangla, Siranwali, Wadala Sandhuan, Dahrmkot Chock, Talwandi Musa Khan Gujranwala and surroundings. This Mega project will not only reduce the distances in between cities but enhance and improve the Business, Educational, and Social activities in Wadala Sandhuan and Surroundings. Lahore Shall be just a half hour and Sialkot 15 mints from Wadala Sandhuan.

=== Distance to biggest cities ===
Cities	Distance
Karachi	1085 km
Lahore	65 km
Faisalabad	151 km
Rawalpindi	201 km
Multan	355 km
Hyderabad	959 km
Gujranwala	21 km
Peshawar	333 km
Quetta	738 km
Islamabad	204 km
Bahawalpur	404 km
Sargodha	163 km
Sialkot	38 km
Sukkur	730 km
Larkana	788 km
Shekhupura	66 km
Jhang Sadar	222 km
Gujrat	52 km
Mardan	314 km
Kasur	119 km
Wah	240 km
Dera Ghazi Khan	430 km
Sahiwal	209 km
Nawabshah	879 km
Mingaora	345 km

=== Nearby villages ===
West	North	East	South
Nathuke (1.8 nm)	Kotli Kheran (1.1 nm)	Qila Thakur Singh (0.4 nm)	Ramke (1.3 nm)
Kotli Kewal Ram (2.0 nm)	Gopipur (1.3 nm)	Chakri (0.9 nm)	Jainabad Ramgarh (1.5 nm)
	Rampura (1.4 nm)	Ismailke (1.4 nm)	Dheerowali (1.4 nm)
	Tahliwala (1.7 nm)	Paharipur (1.4 nm)	Tarwanian (2.4 nm)
	Nurpur Khurd (2.0 nm)	Burheki (1.7 nm)	
	Dera (2.1 nm)	Chak Sadez (2.2 nm)	
	Nurpur Kalan (2.1 nm)	Salloke (9 nm)	

== Climate ==
Wadala Sandhuan

Climate chart (precipitation, max. and min. temperature)
J	F	M	A	M	J	J	A	S	O	N	D
18 19 8	35 22 11	24 27 16	13 33 20	17 39 25	48 39 28	82 35 27	87 35 27	43 34 25	9 32 20	11 27 14	12 21 9
- █ Average max. and min. temperatures in °C
- █ Precipitation totals in mm
- Source: My Weather2
Imperial conversion
J	F	M	A	M	J	J	A	S	O	N	D
0.7 66 46	1.4 72 52	0.9 81 61	0.5 91 68	0.7 102 77	1.9 102 82	3.2 95 81	3.4 95 81	1.7 93 77	0.4 90 68	0.4 81 57	0.5 70 48
- █ Average max. and min. temperatures in °F
- █ Precipitation totals in inches

Wadala Sandhuan is located at 32.11° North, 74.24° East. it is 232 meters (761 ft) above sea level. It shares the borders with some small towns and villages such as Kotli Kheran, Gopipur, Rampur, Chakri, Jhang, Dherowali, Ramke etc.
The climate of Wadala Sandhuan changes quite drastically through the year. It is cold during winters and hot and humid during summers. May and June are the hottest months. It's quite humid during rainy season of July and August. The summer periods last from June through to September where the temperature reaches 36-42 degrees Celsius. The coldest months are usually November to February. The temperature can drop to seven degrees Celsius on average. The highest precipitation months are usually July and August when the Monsoon season hits the Punjab province. Most of the rain falls during the Monsoon season in summer which sometimes results in flooding. During the other months the average rainfall is roughly 25 mm. The driest months are usually November through to April, when little rainfall is seen.

Climate data for Wadala Sandhuan
Month	Jan	Feb	Mar	Apr	May	Jun	Jul	Aug	Sep	Oct	Nov	Dec	Year
Mean daily maximum °C (°F)	19.0 (66.2)	22.0 (71.6)	27.0 (80.6)	33.0 (91.4)	39.0 (102.2)	39.0 (102.2)	35.0 (95.0)	35.0 (95.0)	34.0 (93.2)	32.0 (89.6)	27.0 (80.6)	21.0 (69.8)	30.8 (87.4)
Mean daily minimum °C (°F)	6.0 (42.8)	11.0 (51.8)	16.0 (60.8)	20.0 (68.0)	25.0 (77.0)	28.0 (82.4)	27.0 (80.6)	27.0 (80.6)	25.0 (77.0)	20.0 (68.0)	14.0 (57.2)	9.0 (48.2)	17.8 (64.0)
Average precipitation mm (inches)	18.0 (0.71)	35.0 (1.38)	24.0 (0.94)	13.0 (0.51)	17.0 (0.67)	48.0 (1.89)	82.0 (3.23)	87.0 (3.43)	43.0 (1.69)	9.0 (0.35)	11.0 (0.43)	12.0 (0.47)	628.8 (24.76)
Mean monthly sunshine hours	220.1	217.5	244.9	276	306.9	270	226.3	235.6	267	291.4	261	223.2	3,039.9
Source: My Weather2
