= Sarah Khan =

Pakistani actress (born 1990)

- سارہ خان; सारा ख़ान
- Born: Sarah Zafar Khan; 14 July 1992 (age 34); Medina, Saudi Arabia
- Education: University of Karachi
- Occupations: Actress; VJ; model
- Years active: 2012–present
- Known for: Sabaat (2020); Raqs-e-Bismil (2020); Sher (2025)
- Spouse: Falak Shabir (m. 2020)
- Children: 2
- Relatives: Noor Zafar Khan (sister)
- Awards: Pakistan International Screen Awards
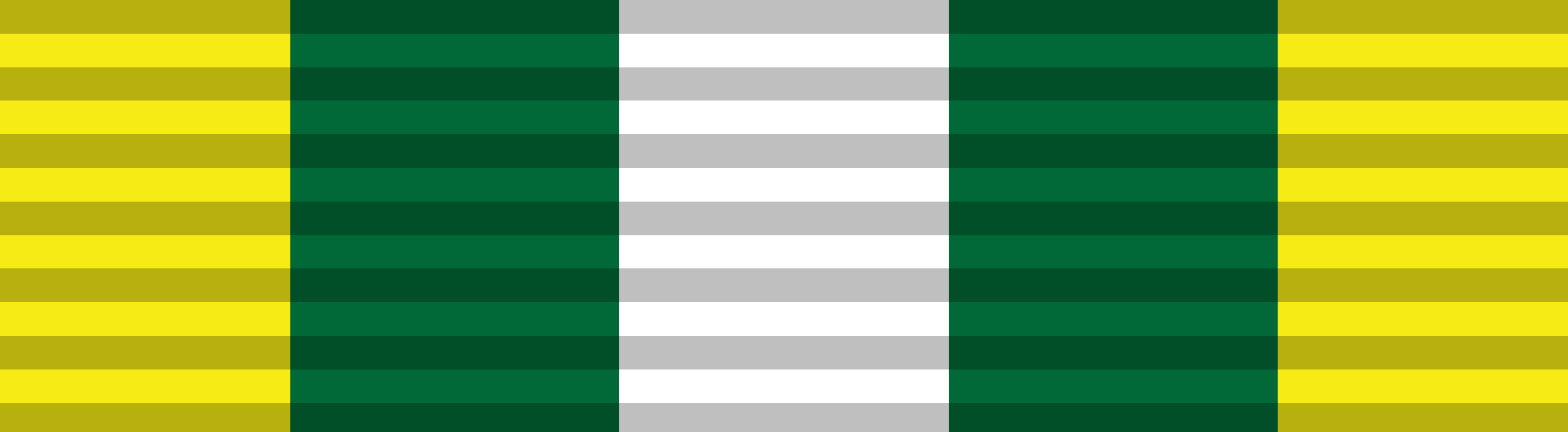
- Honours: Pride of Performance

Sarah Falak (née Zafar Khan; born 14 July 1992) professionally known as Sarah Khan is a Pakistani actress who appears in Pakistani Urdu Dramas. She made her acting debut with a supporting role in Badi Aapa (2012), followed by other brief roles in several series and telefilms. She is the recipient of Pakistan International Screen Awards.

She gained her recognition through romantic series Alvida (2015) and later on appeared as Saba in Mohabbat Aag Si (2015). She subsequently portrayed leading roles in the romantic series Tum Meri Ho (2016), the black magic-based Nazr-e-Bad (2017), Belapur Ki Dayan (2018) and Mere Bewafa (2018).

== Early life ==
Khan was born on 14 July 1992 in Medina, Saudi Arabia to a Lebanese mother and a Pakistani Pashtun father of Yusufzai tribe. She has two sisters and one brother including, Noor Zafar Khan who is also an actress.

== Career ==
=== Early work and its recognition (2012–2019) ===
Sarah made her acting debut as a supporting lead, in Badi Aapa along with Savera Nadeem and Nauman Ijaz. Next, she appeared in a telenovela series Mirat-ul-Uroos opposite Mehwish Hayat, Mikaal Zulfiqar and Ahsan Khan which was aired on Geo Entertainment in the same year. After portraying numerous supportive roles, Khan made her first debut as lead actress in Saltanat-e-Dil opposite Sami Khan and Aleezay Rasul.

In 2015, her breakthrough came with a negative role of a selfish opportunist in romantic drama Alvida with Sanam Jung and Imran Abbas Naqvi for which later she garnered Hum Award nomination for Best Supporting Actress. In the same year, she played the role of a brave housewife in Mohabbat Aag Si along with Azfar Rehman and also won Hum Award for Best Supporting Actress.

In 2016, Sarah portrayed as a kind-hearted woman in Tum Meri Ho opposite Faysal Qureshi and it received positive reviews from audiences. In 2018, she played as innocent Tasha in Belapur Ki Dayan opposite Adnan Siddiqui and Amar Khan. In the same year, she played a struggling housewife in Mere Bewafa along with Aagha Ali.

=== Established actress (2020–present) ===
In 2020, Khan earned recognition and praises for playing an arrogant woman Miraal in Sabaat alongside Usman Mukhtar. For her performance she won the PISA Award for Best Television Actress Popular. Then she, received praises for outstanding performance in Raqs e Bismil with Imran Ashraf.

In 2021, Khan portrayed as a badminton player in Laapata opposite Ayeza Khan and Ali Rehman Khan. Khan played a psychology student Maha Qutub ud-Din in the Ramadan series Hum Tum opposite Junaid Khan in 2022.Ramsha Khan, Ahad Raza Mir and Junaid Khan in their second project together after Main Kaisay Kahun. Then, sarah played as an over ambitious girl Anum in Wabaal alongside Talha Chahour.

In 2023, Khan appeared as a wealthy woman in Namak Haram with Imran Ashraf also, marks their second project together after Raqs-e-Bismil. In 2024, she appeared in lightened romantic series Abdullahpur Ka Devdas with Bilal Abbas Khan in their first on-screen appearance. In 2025, sarah portrayed as a Doctor in Blockbuster family series Sher opposite Danish Taimoor which marks their second collaboration after Hum Tehray Gunahgaar and the series crossed 4 billion views and emerged as a record-breaking hit.

== Personal life ==
On 15 July 2020, Sarah married singer and lyricist Falak Shabir, a few weeks after their engagement. On 8 October 2021, the couple announced the birth of their daughter, Alyana Falak. On the 22nd May 2026, the couple Sarah the birth of their second daughter Rania Falak.

== Other work and media image ==
Khan has also appeared as a guest on various shows. Khan became the tenth most searched person on Google in Pakistan in 2020. Also, in the same year she was placed in "Best Leading Pakistani Actresses" list for performance in Deewar-e-Shab and Sabaat. Then, featured 9th in "The Most Beautiful Pakistani Actresses 2020". In 2021, Khan was featured in "Most Popular Pakistani Actors" list. In 2022, Khan was placed in "Best Pakistani Actresses" list, for her performance in Hum Tum. Khan was placed in Hello Pakistan's HOT100 list, in the "Trailblazers" category, in the same year. The actress serves as a brand ambassador for several products such as Veet and Realme and has done several photoshoots. As of April 2024, Khan was the fourth most-followed Pakistani celebrity on Instagram.

On 14 August 2022, Sarah received the "Pride of Performance" award in Norway for her work in Pakistani dramas. She was awarded by the Committee in Oslo, and expressed gratitude for the honor of representing Pakistan overseas. In 2024, she was featured in "Top 10 Pakistani Actresses" list for her performance in Namak Haram and Abdullahpur Ka Devdas. In February 2025, Sarah Khan launched her own clothing line named Alyana.

== Filmography ==
=== TV series ===
Year	Title	Role	Network	Ref(s)	Notes
2012	Badi Aapa	Sharmeen	Hum TV		Debut Series
2012	Mirat-ul-Uroos	Javeria (Joey)	Geo Entertainment		
2013	Gohar-e-Nayab	Sara	A-Plus Entertainment		
2013	Ek Kasak Reh Gayi	Chudana Khan	Geo Entertainment		
2013–2014	Shehr-e-Ajnabi	Minal	A-Plus Entertainment		
2014	Ghar Aik Jannat	Hira	Geo Entertainment		
2014	Bhool	Nadia	Hum TV		
2014	Hum Tehray Gunahgaar	Ayesha	Hum TV		
2014–2015	Saltanat-e-Dil	Anushey Hayat	Geo Entertainment		Debut as lead actress
2014–2015	Dil Nahi Manta	Shanzay	ARY Digital		
2015	Alvida	Farisa Hadi	Hum TV		
2015	Mohabbat Aag Si	Saba	Hum TV		
2015	Mumkin	Mayra	ARY Digital		
2015–2016	Naraaz	Feriha	ARY Digital		
2016	Main Kaisay Kahun	Saman	Urdu 1		
2016	Tum Meri Ho	Ana	ARY Digital		
2016	Dekho Chaand Aaya	Chand	Geo Entertainment		Ramadan Series
2016	Ahsas	Hina	Urdu 1		
2017	Tumhare Hain	Aania	ARY Digital		
2017	Mohabbat.pk	Fariya	Hum TV		
2017	Nazr-e-Bad	Maham	Hum TV		
2017	Yaar-e-Bewafa	Amna Zayad	Geo Entertainment		
2017–2018	Karamat e Ishq	Sana	TV One		
2018	Belapur Ki Dayan	Natasha (Tasha)	Hum TV		
2018	Mere Bewafa	Azra	A-Plus Entertainment		
2018–2019	Band Khirkiyan	Saboohi	Hum TV		
2019	Mere Humdam	Warda	Hum TV		
2019–2020	Deewar-e-Shab	Geti Ara	Hum TV		
2020	Sabaat	Miraal Fareed Haris	Hum TV		
2020–2021	Raqs-e-Bismil	Zohra	Hum TV		
2021	Laapata	Falak	Hum TV		
2022	Hum Tum	Maha Sarmad Sultan	Hum TV		Ramadan Series
2022–2023	Wabaal	Anum	Hum TV		
2023–2024	Namak Haram	Asma Mureed	Hum TV		
2025	Sher	Dr. Fajar Sher Zaman	ARY Digital		

=== Telefilms and Special appearances ===
Year	Title	Role	Network	Ref(s)	Notes
2013	Kitni Girhain Baaki Hain	Zarmina	Hum TV		
2015	Maana Ka Gharana	Saman	Hum TV		Cameo appearance
2017	Kitni Girhain Baaki Hain 2	Khushi	Hum TV		Episode: "Ghairat Mand"
2018	Ustani Jee	Zainab	Hum TV		Episode: 9
2018	The After Moon Show 2	Herself	Hum TV		Episode: 4
2020	Shadi Ka Rona	Aiman	ARY Digital		Telefilm

=== Web series ===
Year	Title	Role	Network	Ref.
2024	Abdullahpur Ka Devdas	Gul Bano	Zee Zindagi	

== Awards and nominations ==
Year	Work	Category	Result	Ref.
Hum Awards
2016	Alvida	Best Supporting Actress	Nominated	
2016	Mohabbat Aag Si	Best Supporting Actress	Won	
2019	Belapur Ki Dayan	Best Actress Popular	Nominated	
2019	Belapur Ki Dayan	Best Actress Jury	Nominated	
2022	Raqs-e-Bismil	Best Actress Popular	Nominated	
2022	Raqs-e-Bismil	Best Onscreen Couple Popular with Imran Ashraf	Nominated	
2022	Raqs-e-Bismil	Best Actress Jury	Nominated	
2022	Raqs-e-Bismil	Best Onscreen Couple Jury with Imran Ashraf	Nominated	
2025	Namak Haram	Best Actress Popular	Nominated	
2025	Namak Haram	Best Onscreen Couple Popular with Imran Ashraf	Nominated	
2025	Namak Haram	Best Actress Jury	Nominated	
2025	Namak Haram	Best Onscreen Couple Jury with Imran Ashraf	Nominated	
Pakistan International Screen Awards
2020	Deewar-e-Shab	Best TV Actress	Nominated	
2021	Sabaat	Best TV Actress Popular	Won	
Lux Style Awards
2022	Raqs-e-Bismil	Best TV Actress - Viewer's choice	Nominated	
2025	Namak Haram	Best Actor of the Year - Female Viewers’ Choice	Nominated	
ARY Digital Social Media Drama Awards
2018	Tumhare Hain	Best Supporting Role Female	Nominated	
Hum Social Media Awards
2020	—N/a	Most Popular Actor (Female)	Nominated	

== Other recognitions ==
Year	Title	Category	Ref.
2022	Pride of Performance	Contribution to arts	
