= Zhalay Sarhadi =

Pakistani actress and model (born 1981)

Zhalay Sarhadi ژالے سرحدی
- Sarhadi in 2022
- Born: 11 June 1981 (age 45); Karachi, Pakistan
- Occupations: Actress; model
- Years active: 2008–present
- Spouse: Amir Anees (m. 2012)
- Relatives: Zia Sarhadi (grandfather); Khayyam Sarhadi (uncle)

Zhalay Sarhadi (Urdu pronunciation: [ʒaːˈle ˈsaɾhaˈdi] Urdu: ژالے سرحدی, romanized: Žālê Sarḥadî; Persian: Zhâleh, Persian pronunciation: [ʒɒːˈleh ˈsæɾhæˈdiː]), also spelled Zille Sarhadi (born 11 June 1981), is a Pakistani actress, model, and former VJ. Her notable performances include the series Uraan (2010), Aks (2012), Madiha Maliha (2012), Digest Writer (2014), Rang Laaga (2015), Nazo (2015), and Yaar Na Bichray (2021). In 2018, she received a Lux Style Award nomination for her performance in the film Chalay Thay Sath.

== Career ==
Sarhadi began her career as an actress and later became a model, appearing in magazines such as Libaas as well as in runway shows. In 2015, she appeared in the film Jalaibee, and in 2022, she had a part in Kashan Admani's directorial debut, Carma – The Movie.

== Personal life ==
Sarhadi is the niece of actor Khayyam Sarhadi and granddaughter of Zia Sarhadi. She is married to Amir Anees. They have one daughter.

== Selected filmography ==
=== Film ===
List of film appearances, with year, title, and role shown
Year	Film	Role	Notes
2008	Ramchand Pakistani	Lakshmi	
2015	Jalaibee	Bunno	
2017	Chalay Thay Sath	Aleena	
2022	Carma – The Movie	Sasha	

=== Television ===
List of film appearances, with year, title, and role shown
Year	Title	Role	Notes
2008	Mutthi Bhar Mitti	Durrain	TV movie
2010	Uraan	Ayesha	
2011	Sabz Pari Laal Kabootar	Fouzia	
2012	Aks	Zohra	
2012	Barzakh	Sabahat	
2012	Daray Daray Naina	Rinek	
2012	Kitni Girhain Baaki Hain	Aima	Episode: "Dekh Kabira Dekh"
2012	Kahi Un Kahi	Maryam	
2012	Madiha Maliha	Madiha	
2012	Nadamat	Sanam	
2012	Halka Na Lo	Zubia	
2014	Digest Writer	Rida Anmol	
2015	Sartaj Mera Tu Raaj Mera	Neelam	
2015	Rang Laaga	Laila	
2015	Nazo	Samra	
2015	Deemak	Hafza	
2017	Dil-e-Jaanam	Asma	
2018	Mere Bewafa	Mona	
2019	Aik Aur Sitam Hai		Playback singer for title song "Aik Aur Sitam Hai"
2019	Qismat Ka Likha	Mehreen	
2020	Haqeeqat	Misaal	Episode: "Muqadma"
2021	Yaar Na Bichray	Fiza	
2022	Beqadar	Komal	
2022	Pinjra	Fareeda	
2023	Guru	Fakhra	
2023	Hadsa	Bakhtawar	
2025	Judwaa	Salma	

=== Music video ===
Year	Title	Artist	Notes
2020	"Ye Watan Tumhara Hai"	Various	

== Awards and nominations ==
- 2018 – Lux Style Awards – Best Supporting Actress for Chalay Thay Sath – Nominated
