= Rashed Rahman =

Rashed Rahman is the former editor of one of Pakistan's major English language newspapers, the Daily Times. He served as the editor from 2009 – November 2015.

== Early life and career ==
Rashed Rahman qualified as a Chartered accountant from England and Wales and later decided to take up journalism as career. He has formerly been the executive editor of English dailies published from Pakistan - The Post, The Nation (Pakistan) and Daily Times (Pakistan). He is ajournalist and a veteran leftist political campaigner. As editor of Daily Times newspaper, he used to protect his reporters and columnists from the external interference.

In November 2017, Rahman wrote as a columnist for Dawn Group of Newspapers.
