= Mere Bewafa =

- Genre: Drama; Romance
- Written by: Zanjabeel Asim Shah
- Directed by: Sakina Samo
- Starring: Agha Ali; Sarah Khan; Zhalay Sarhadi
- Opening theme: "Dhuhayain" by Agha Ali & Aima Baig
- Composer: Qasim Azhar
- Country of origin: Pakistan
- Original language: Urdu
- No. of episodes: 24

Production
- Producer: Sadia Jabbar
- Running time: 30–45 minutes
- Production company: Sadia Jabbar Productions

Original release
- Network: A-Plus Entertainment
- Release: 7 March – 15 August 2018

Mere Bewafa is a 2018 Pakistani drama serial that originally aired on A-Plus Entertainment from 7 March 2018. It is directed by actress and director Sakina Samo, written by Zanjabeel Asim Shah and stars Agha Ali, Sarah Khan and Zhalay Sarhadi in pivot roles.

== Cast ==
- Agha Ali as Shahmeer (Main male lead)
- Sarah Khan as Azra (Main female lead)
- Zhalay Sarhadi as Mona (Antagonist)
- Shagufta Ejaz as Safia
- Madiha Rizvi as Muskan
- Pari Hashmi as Hina
- Sabiha Hashmi as Nighat
- Osama Tahir as Khizar
- Hassan Noman as shahnawaz
- Sadaf Aashan as Abdah

== Production ==
Serial is directed by actress and director Sakina Samo, and produced by Sadia Jabbar Productions. The drama features Sarah Khan and Agha Ali in lead. Zhalay Sarhadi Pari hashmi khan playing the role of the antagonist.

== Soundtrack ==
Mere Bewafa

Soundtrack album by Agha Ali
- Released: 27 February 2018
- Recorded: 2018
- Genre: Television soundtrack
- Length: (3:38)
- Language: Punjabi
- Label: A-Plus Entertainment

Music video
- "Mere Bewafa" OST on YouTube

The title song was composed by Agha Ali and has more than 2 million views on YouTube.

=== Track listing ===
No.	Title	Lyrics	Music	Singer(s)	Length
1.	"Dhuhayain"	Agha Ali	Qasim Azhar	Agha Ali, Aima Baig	3.38
