= Adnan Siddiqui =

Pakistani actor, producer and model

Adnan Siddiqui PP
- عدنان صدیقی
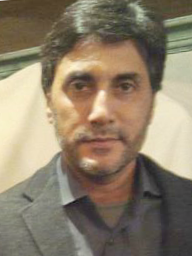
- Born: 23 October 1969 (age 57); Lahore, Punjab, Pakistan
- Occupations: Tv actor, film actor, model, producer, Host
- Years active: 1989–present
- Known for: A Mighty Heart (Hollywood film); Aroosa (PTV); Ishq Junoon Deewangi; Mere Paas Tum Ho
- Spouse: Palwasha Siddiqui (m. 1999)
- Relatives: Asad Siddiqui (nephew)

Adnan Siddiqui (Urdu: عدنان صدیقی born 23 October 1969) is a Pakistani actor, producer and model who has worked in Lollywood and Hollywood and also made his debut in Bollywood with the Hindi film Mom (2017). He also has his own production house, Cereal Entertainment. As a television actor, he is best known for his role in PTV's classical drama Aroosa (1994) and a supporting role in Mere Paas Tum Ho (2019)

== Early life and education ==
Adnan is the youngest in a family of eight children, born in Lahore where his father moved from Uttar Pradesh before shifting the whole family to Karachi some time after the birth of Adnan. Siddiqui was educated at the St. Patrick's High School, Karachi.

His nephew is actor Asad Siddiqui.

== Career ==
=== Actor ===
Adnan has appeared in many commercials and drama serials, including Aroosa, Pal Do Pal, Meri Adhoori Mohabbat, Meri Zaat Zara-e-Benishan, Doraha, Hawa Rait Aur Aangan, Choti Si Kahani, Vasl and Parsa. Siddiqui first started his filming career in the 1990s; he became notable for being cast in the popular drama Uroosa and one of the famous travel reality shows of the time Gulls & Guys directed by Shoaib Mansoor. In 2002, he was nominated for Best Actor (TV) in the Lux Style Awards and was its red carpet host. He also played a small role alongside Angelina Jolie and Irrfan Khan in the 2007 film A Mighty Heart. In 2010, Siddiqui won Best Supporting Actor Award for Ishq Junoon Deewangi on Pakistan Media Award. He made his Pakistani debut in the 2017 film Yalghaar. Siddiqui has acted in the roles that were better suited for the young actors and he admitted that "people ask why I act with women half my age".

=== Producer ===
He owns the production house Cereal Productions.

=== Musician ===
Siddiqui has expressed a long-standing interest in music, particularly in playing the flute. Siddiqui described how his interest in the instrument began after encountering a flute seller in Karachi, which inspired him to take up the flute. He stated that he is largely self-taught and had earlier trained himself to play the harmonica, which facilitated his transition to learning the flute. Among his numerous public renditions with the flute, in 2020 he posted a video of himself performing a flute rendition of Noor Jehan’s patriotic song "Ae Watan Ke Sajeele Jawaano" to commemorate Youm-e-Fizaya and to pay tribute to the Pakistan Air Force.

In 2021, he made his singing debut with the song "Dil Chahta Hai" as part of the music television series Kashmir Beats. The track features Siddiqui as the vocalist and was released as a studio performance under the series, marking his first recorded appearance as a singer.

== Filmography ==
=== Actor ===
==== Films ====
Year	Movie	Role	Director	Producer	Country	Notes
2002	Daira	Ozi	Azfar Ali		Pakistan	Urdu film debut; adaptation of Mohsin Hamid's Moth Smoke
2007	A Mighty Heart	Dost Aliani	Michael Winterbottom		United States	Hollywood film
2017	Yalghaar	Col. Imran	Hassan Rana		Pakistan	
2017	Mom	Anand Sabarwal	Ravi Udyawar		India	Hindi film debut
2022	Dum Mastam	Director (cameo)	Mohammed Ehteshamuddin	Yes	Pakistan	Also producer with Akhtar Hasnain under Cereal Entertainment
2022	Carma - The Movie	Ali Khan	Kashan Admani		Pakistan	
2024	Umro Ayyar – A New Beginning	Amar's father	Azfar Jafri		Pakistan	
2024	Nayab	Sikander Malik	Umair Nasir Ali			

==== Television ====
Year	Title	Role	TV Channel	Notes	Ref
1992	Nadan Nadia	Sheharyar Ahmed	PTV	Written and directed by Anwar Maqsood	
1994	Aroosa	Shehryar	PTV	Directed by Qasim Jalali	
1996	Pal Do Pal	Faraz	PTV	Written by Haseena Moin	
1998	Saibaan		PTV	Written by Naheed Sultana Akhtar	
1999	Colony 52		PTV		
1999	Sila		PTV	Directed by Misbah Khalid	
1999	Samander Hai Darmiyan		PTV		
1999	Ghulam Gardish		PTV		
1999	Tum Kya Milay	Zohaib	PTV	Long play	
2000	Zaib-un-Nisa	Mehmood	PTV	Directed by Sahira Kazmi	
2001	Chehra		PTV		
2001	Kabhi Kabhi Pyaar Main			Directed By Afreen Baig	
2003	Umrao Jaan Ada		Geo Entertainment		
2003	Mehndi	Taha	PTV	Directed by Muhammad Javaid Fazil	
2004	Be Zaban	Jibran	PTV	Directed by Muhammad Javaid Fazil	
2004	Wajood-E-Lariab	Mohid Farooq	Indus TV	Written by Umera Ahmed	
2005	Aandhi	Adeel	PTV		Directed by M Usman Zulfiqar Ali
2005	Shiddat	Kashan	Hum TV		
2006	Manzil	Sajid	ARY Digital		
2007	Yaadain		PTV Home	Nominated for 7th Lux Style Awards in the category of Best TV Play (Terrestrial)	
2007	Dually Wed (aka Aurat Aur Char Dewari)	Rafiq	ARY Digital	TV movie	
2007	Wilco	Major Jamshed	PTV Home		
2008	Meri Adhoori Mohabbat		Geo Entertainment		
2008	Kaisa Yeh Junoon		ARY Digital	Nominated in the 2 categories of 8th Lux Style Awards	
2008	Socha Na Tha				
2008	Doraha	Azfar	Geo Entertainment	Nominated in 4 categories of 9th Lux Style Awards, Written by Umera Ahmed	
2009	Mulaqat		Hum TV		
2009	Aania		TVOne		
2009	Shiddat		Hum TV	Directed By M.JAvaid Fazil	
2009	Meri Jaan		Hum TV		
2009	Meri Zaat Zara-e-Benishan	Aadil	Geo Entertainment	Nominated for 5 categories of 10th Lux Style Awards, Written by Umera Ahmad	
2010	Vasl	Hashim	Hum TV	Directed by Mehreen Jabbar	
2010	Thori Si Wafa Chahiye	Jasim	Geo TV		
2010	Hawa Rait Aur Aangan	Saad	PTV Home	Directed by Ali Rizvi	
2010	Diya Jalay	Asfand	ARY Digital		
2010	Choti Si Kahani	Ahmed	PTV Home	Nominated for 6 categories of THE 3RD PAKISTAN MEDIA AWARDS, Written by Haseena Moin	
2010	Parsa	Salman	Hum TV	Dramatized By Tahira Wasti	
2011	Kasi Yeh Agan		PTV Home		
2011	Jal Pari	Rashid	Geo Entertainment	Directed by Sarmad Khoosat	
2011	Meray Qatil Meray Dildar	Bakhtiar	Hum TV		
2011	Maat	Faisal	Hum TV	Written by Umera Ahmed	
2011	Mohabbat Rooth Jaye Toh	Zain	Hum TV	Written by Faiza Iftikhar	
2012	Shikwa Na Shikyat Hai		Express Entertainment		
2012	Mohabbat Jaye Bhar Mein	Basharat	Hum TV		
2012	Sandal		Geo Entertainment	special appearance	
2012	Pat Jahr Ke Bad		Urdu 1		
2013	Humnasheen	Hasan	Hum TV		
2013	Ek Thi Paro		TV One		
2014	Darmiyan		ARY Digital		
2014	Aahista Aahista	Zawar	Hum TV		
2014	Ru Baru	Taimur	Hum TV		
2014	Mere Humdum Mere Dost	Haydar	Urdu 1	Writer Farhat Ishtiaq	
2014	Jaanam		A-Plus TV		
2015	Kitna Satatay Ho	Hasan	Hum TV		
2015	Pakeeza	Azeem	Hum TV	Written by Bushra Ansari	
2015	Karb	Hamza	Hum TV		
2015	Mohabbat Ho Gayi Tumse	Ryam	TV One	Written by Haseena Moin	
2015	Dil Tere Naam		Urdu 1		
2016	Khushboo ka safar		TV One		
2017	Aitbaar		Aaj Entertainment		
2017	Sammi	Rashid	Hum TV	Written by Noor ul Huda Shah	
2018	Ghughi	Rashid	TV One	based on Amrita Pritam's novel	
2018	Belapur Ki Dayan	Shakir	Hum TV	Nominated for 6 categories of Hum Awards	
2019	Mere Paas Tum Ho	Shehwar	ARY Digital	Written by Khalil-ur-Rehman Qamar	
2019	Yeh Dil Mera	Mir Farooq Zaman	Hum TV	Written by Farhat Ishtiaq	
2023	Siyaah	Bedaar	Green Entertainment	Episode "Iqbal e Jurm"	
2023	Khushbo Mein Basay Khat	Ahmed Zaryab	Hum TV		
2024	Akhri Baar	Sheheryar	Express Entertainment		
2024	Gentleman	Rahmatullah "Rehmati" Bangash	Green Entertainment		
2026	Zanjeerain	Zafran Khan	Hum TV		

=== Producer ===
As a producer, he has produced several television series and films under his production banner Cereal Productions.

Year	Title	Genre	Episodes	Notes
2016–17	Seeta Bagri	Drama	31	
2017	Pujaran	Drama	37	
2017	Jalti Barish	Soap	71	
2017	Aadat	Drama	32	
2018	Ghughi	Drama	29	
2018	Saiyaan Way	Soap	87	
2019–20	Mein Na Janoo	Drama	37	co-produced with MD Productions
2020	Ghamandi	Drama	29	
2022	Dum Mastam	Film		

=== Host ===
Year	Title	Network
2022	Tamasha (Season 1)	ARY Digital
2023	Tamasha (Season 2)	ARY Digital
2024	Tamasha (Season 3)	ARY Digital
2025	Tamasha (Season 4)	ARY Digital
2026	Tamasha (Season 5)	ARY Digital

=== Other appearances ===
Year		Role	Network	Notes
2020	Jeeto Pakistan League (Season 1)	Himself	ARY Digital	Captain (Lahore Falcons)/5th Position
2021	Jeeto Pakistan League (Season 2)	Himself	ARY Digital	Captain (Lahore Falcons)/Winner
2022	Jeeto Pakistan League (Season 3)	Himself	ARY Digital	Captain (Lahore Falcons)

== Awards and nominations ==
Year	Awards	Category	Project	Result	Ref(s)
2005	The 1st Indus Drama Awards	Best Actor Serial in a Leading Role	Wujood-e-Laraib	Nominated	
2010	Pakistan Media Award	Best Supporting Actor	Ishq Junoon Deewangi	Won	
2012	Hum Awards	Best Actor	Meray Qatil Meray Dildar	Nominated	
2013	Hum Awards	Best Actor	Humnasheen	Nominated	
2014	Hum Awards	Best Actor	Aahista Aahista	Nominated	
2015	Hum Awards	Best Actor	Karb	Nominated	
2017	Hum Awards	Best Actor	Sammi	Won	
2017	Hum Awards	Best Onscreen Couple Popular	Sammi	Nominated	
2019	Hum Awards	Best Actor Popular	Belapur Ki Dayan	Nominated	
2024	PMMA Awards	Best Actor		Won	
2025	10th Hum Awards	Best Actor - Popular	Khushbo Mein Basay Khat	Nominated	
2025	10th Hum Awards	Best Actor - Jury	Khushbo Mein Basay Khat	Won	
2025	10th Hum Awards	Most Impactful Character	Khushbo Mein Basay Khat	Nominated	
2025	10th Hum Awards	Kashmir Golden Plate Award		Won	

=== Lux Style Awards ===
Year	Ceremony	Category	Project	Result	Ref(s)
2002	1st Lux Style Awards	Best TV Actor	N/A	Nominated	
2013	12th Lux Style Awards	Best TV Actor (Satellite)	Meray Qatil Meray Dildar	Nominated	
2018	17th Lux Style Awards	Best TV Actor	Sammi	Nominated	
2019	18th Lux Style Awards	Best TV Track	Ghughi	Nominated	
