= Pinjra (2022 TV series) =

Pakistani drama television series

- Urdu: پنجرہ
- Written by: Asma Nabeel
- Directed by: Najaf Bilgrami
- Country of origin: Pakistan
- Original language: Urdu
- No. of episodes: 28

Production
- Producer: Shazia Wajahat
- Camera setup: Multi-camera setup
- Production company: Showcase Productions

Original release
- Network: ARY Digital
- Release: 6 October 2022 – 6 April 2023

Pinjra (Urdu: پنجرہ) is a Pakistani drama television series directed by Najaf Bilgrami, written by Pakistani screenwriter Asma Nabeel. The series is produced by Shazia Wajahat under banner Showcase Productions. It premiered on 6 October 2022 on ARY Digital with double episodes every week. The series stars Hadiqa Kiani, Omair Rana, with child actors Aashir Wajahat, Aina Asif, and Ahmed Usman in leading roles.

The series received positive reviews due to its subject of parenting techniques and children’s issues.

== Plot ==
Abaan is a troubled young kid, who lives in a very strict family. His interests lie in art and music, whereas his father Javed tells him that these are useless subjects and scolds him for pursuing them. Abaan's mother Khadjia is also very strict, but she understands Abaan's feelings and she can't stand up for herself against her husband. Abaan's older brother Azaan is the good kid and he always makes his parents proud, whereas his sister Abeer (Aina Asif) is the complete opposite, since she has a phone, unbeknownst to her parents, and is very politically active on social media. Khadija's friend Wajiha is a divorcee since she had an abusive husband named Sheharyar. Her two kids, Fardan and Dua, both support her and so does her servant, Firoza Bi.

One day, Abaan fails his tests, and his father and sister both call him losers and a disappointment, and Javed threatens to send Abaan to boarding school, but Azaan convinces him that he will help Abaan study and be better at his studies. Khadija finds out about Abeer's phone, but her boyfriend secretly gifts her another one. Abaan then befriends a rich kid named Bilal, and he gives Abaan drugs to get rid of his tensions. Abaan steals money from Javed's wallet to give to Bilal for the drugs. One day, Azaan becomes "Head Boy" of the university, but Abeer gets in trouble for bullying a girl on social media, and Abaan finds a kid name Umer trash talking Abeer. Abaan and Umer fight, but Umer accidentally falls over the balcony, sending him to the hospital.

Since Umer is a rich kid, his father gets Abaan arrested. During the investigation, the school finds out about Abaan and the drugs, and they take this matter to court. But it turns out that Javed's lawyer is actually working for Umer's father and he says he will try to make sure that he won't let Abaan's bail happen. Wajiha meets Arsalan, who happens to be a lawyer, so Khadija tries to hire him, but Javed intervenes, thinking that Wajiha and Arsalan are having an affair, since he doesn't like Wajiha.

== Cast ==
- Hadiqa Kiani as Khadija
- Ali Siddiqui as Saleem
- Omair Rana as Javaid
- Aashir Wajahat as Azaan
- Ahmed Usman as Abaan
- Aina Asif as Abeer
- Sunita Marshall as Wajiha
- Emaan Khan as Dua
- Zuhab Khan as Fardan
- Fareeha Jabeen as Feroza Bi
- Jinaan Hussain as Rabia
- Zhalay Sarhadi as Fareeda, School Principal
- Furqan Qureshi as Arsalan
- Sharique Mehmood as Bakht

== Production ==
Producer Shaiza Wajaht revealed in September 2021 that pre-production work on the last script of screenwriter and playwright Asma Nabeel, has been started. She revealed that Najaf Bilgrami will direct the series who was also the director of Nabeel's 2019 series Damsa. In December 2021, it reported that singer turned actress Hadiqa Kiani has been cast in the leading role with Omair Rana and Aashir Wajahat. It marked her third acting project after Raqeeb Se and Dobara.
