= Bharam =

Pakistani television drama series

- Left to right: Tipu Sharif, Wahaj Ali, Noor Khan, Arslan Asad Butt, Mariam Ansari
- Written by: Ali Afzal Kamal
- Directed by: Meer Sikandar Ali
- Starring: Noor Khan; Wahaj Ali
- Opening theme: Aatish-e-Haath Koi Chooth Gaya
- Ending theme: Ek Hi Pal Mein Bharam Toot Gaya
- Country of origin: Pakistan
- Original language: Urdu
- No. of seasons: 1
- No. of episodes: 40

Production
- Producer: Momina Duraid
- Camera setup: Multi-camera setup
- Production company: MD Productions

Original release
- Network: Hum TV
- Release: 4 March – 22 July 2019

Related
- Bisaat e Dil; Naqab Zan

Bharam (Urdu: بھرم) is a 2019 Pakistani television series, produced by Momina Duraid under their banner MD Productions. The drama aired on Hum TV every Monday and Tuesday 9:10pm PST from March to July 2019. It stars Noor Zafar Khan and Wahaj Ali in lead roles.

== Cast ==
- Noor Zafar Khan as Noor Maarif Ali (née Noor Mushtaq)
- Wahaj Ali as RJ Maarif Ali
- Mariam Ansari as Warda Hammad Burhan (née Warda Waheed)
- Salma Hassan as Ishrat Mushtaq
- Laila Wasti as Farah Burhan
- Arslan Asad Butt as Hammad Burhan
- Namrah Shahid as Leena Afaaq
- Shamyl Khan as Burhan
- Kinza Malik as Saima Afaaq
- Tipu Sharif as Uzaib Afaaq
- Mohsin Gillani as Afaaq
