= Shazia Wajahat =

Pakistani film producer

- شازیہ وجاہت
- Occupations: television and film producer
- Spouse: Wajahat Rauf
- Children: 2

Shazia Wajahat is a Pakistani television and film producer. The wife of director Wajahat Rauf, she is best known for producing a number of television series under her production banner Showcase Productions, formerly known as Showcase Communications.

== Career ==
Wajahat made her debut by producing the television series Shab-e-Arzoo Ka Aalam for ARY Digital. She then produced some successful television series, including Yaar-e-Bewafa (2017), Damsa (2019) and Raqs-e-Bismil (2020).

== Film ==
- Parde Mein Rehne Do (2022)

== Television ==
=== Current productions ===
Title	Genre	First aired	Last aired	Cast	Ref(s)
Guru	Social drama	June 2023	present	Ali Rehman Khan, Zhalay Sarhadi	
Akhri Baar	Social drama	14 September 2024	present	Adnan Siddiqui	

=== Former productions ===
Year	Serial	Network	Cast	Episodes	Ref(s)
2013	Shab-e-Arzoo Ka Aalam	ARY Digital	Armeena Rana Khan, Mohib Mirza	23	
2013	Ek Aur Ek Dhai	ARY Digital	Ali Haider, Ali Safina, Mansha Pasha, Ayesha Toor	38	
2014	Soteli	ARY Digital	Ayesha Khan, Sabreen Hisbani, Deepak Parwani	25	
2014	Main Kukkoo Aur Woh	Hum TV	Qavi Khan, Shehzad Sheikh, Ayeza Khan, Aashir Wajahat	—	Telefilm
2016	Main Kaisay Kahu	Urdu 1	Sarah Khan, Junaid Khan	25	
2016	Meher Aur Meherban	Urdu 1	Sonia Mishal, Sanam Chaudhry, Waseem Abbas, Shagufta Ejaz	24	
2017	Tumhare Hain	ARY Digital	Sarah Khan, Agha Ali, Rabab Hashim	26	
2017	Yaar-e-Bewafa	Geo Entertainment	Imran Abbas, Sarah Khan, Arij Fatyma	25	
2018	Woh Mera Dil Tha	ARY Digital	Madiha Imam, Sami Khan, Furqan Qureshi	24	
2018	Qaid	Geo Entertainment	Zara Noor Abbas, Syed Jibran	26	
2019	Damsa	ARY Digital	Nadia Jamil, Emaan Sheikh, Shahood Alvi	27	
2020	Raqs-e-Bismil	Hum TV	Imran Ashraf, Sarah Khan, Zara Sheikh	28	
2021	Dil Ke Chor	Hum TV	Hania Aamir, Momin Saqib, Hina Dilpazeer, Rubina Ashraf	—	Telefilm
202-23	Pinjra	ARY Digital	Hadiqa Kiyani, Omair Rana, Aashir Wajahat	28	
2023	Adan	AannTV	Mansha Pasha, Junaid Khan, Azfar Rehman		
2023	Hadsa	Geo Entertainment	Hadiqa Kiani, Romaisa Khan, Alyy Khan, Zhalay Sarhadi	27	

== Award and achievements ==
Shazia's film Main Kukkoo Aur Woh won the Hum Award for Best Television Film in 2015.
