= Asma Nabeel =

Pakistani screenwriter (died 2021)

- Born: 1970s
- Died: 1 July 2021; Karachi, Pakistan
- Education: University of Karachi (M.A. Mass Communication, 2000)
- Occupations: Screenwriter, producer, poet, creative consultant, artist
- Years active: 2001–2021
- Organization: Crew motion pictures
- Notable work: Khaani, Khuda Mera Bhi Hai

Asma Nabeel (Urdu: اسمہ نبیل,1970s – 1 July 2021) was a Pakistani screenwriter, poet, producer and creative consultant. She wrote scripts for Pakistani dramas including Khuda Mera Bhi Hai and Khaani.

== Education ==
Nabeel completed her Master's degree in Mass Communication from University of Karachi in 2000.

== Career ==
=== Creative consultant ===
She worked as an advertising consultant in many companies. She remained a creative director at JWT for four years. She also remained a creative head at ORIENTM. Nabeel later became a Chief creative officer at Walter Pakistan.

=== Screenwriter ===
Nabeel made her debut into screenwriting when diagnosed with breast cancer, after which she had to undergo several chemotherapy sessions. In these sessions, she wanted to spend more time with herself, so she started writing one-liners. One day, she ran into Sana Shahnawaz; a new producer with whom Nabeel collaborated to produce the screenplay Khuda Mera Bhi Hai. Nabeel wrote a 26-episode series which was produced by Sana Shahnawaz into the play. The drama raised the issue of tolerance and acceptance of unisex children in society. It was aired on ARY Digital and starred Ayesha Khan and Syed Jibran as lead actors.

Nabeel wrote the TV series Khaani for Seventh Sky Entertainment which became a popular series and outranked many other drama serials running at the time. It starred Feroze Khan and Sana Javed as the lead actors. The drama received six nominations at the Lux Style Awards 2019.

In 2018, she wrote the hit movie Maan Jao Naa with Ahsan Raza Firdousi. The movie is a romantic comedy.

Nabeel was known for writing content that highlights social issues. In 2019, Nabeel wrote the drama Damsa, a series about child abductions. Her drama series Surkh Chandni also touched a social topic of acid attacks. The story revolved around an acid attack victim played by Sohai Ali Abro. Nabeel's drama serial Baandi highlighted the topic of ill treatment of maids in Pakistan.

Nabeel was also the COO of Crew motion pictures, a production house that produced many of Nabeel's projects.

=== Poet ===
Nabeel made her debut in Bollywood by writing lyrics for a song featured in Helicopter Eela, starring Kajol. The song was performed by Shilpa Rao. Nabeel previously worked with Helicopter Eela director Pradeep Sarkar on a few commercials when she was in advertising. Pradeep liked Nabeel's writing, and so he ended up contacting her to write a song for his movie.

While writing dramas, Nabeel was urged to publish a book. At the time, she wanted to write Urdu poetry. When Asma went to London in 2018, she met Beo Zafar who introduced Nabeel to her English poetry book A Dreamer Awakes. During her meeting, Zafar had told Nabeel that she wanted someone to translate her poetry into Urdu. Nabeel then took permission from Zafar to translate the poetry. The translated work was published by Nabeel under the name Beydaari.

=== Social work ===
Nabeel was involved in projects that highlight social issues. She was working on a new project Fly. Fly is a movie revolving around breast cancer and it will cast Hajra Yamin and Wahaj Ali as the lead roles. She revealed that the film will be directed by Misbaa Khalid. The production design will be done by Beenish and music will be produced by Schumaila Hussain. In an interview, Nabeel called her project a "long journey for a cause that’s very close to my heart”. She further said: "It's a film from the females of Pakistan for the females of Pakistan."

Nabeel was also a speaker on many social issues. She ran polio awareness campaigns and breast cancer testing. She often spoke about breast cancer awareness and worked towards removing the taboo around it.

Nabeel collaborated with Sadia Jabbar to create and host a show called Beautiful Confessions with Asma Nabeel. The show aimed to air stories of women that were unheard of in society. The show was launched on women's day.

== Awards ==
Asma Nabeel was named Pond's Miracle woman in 2015.

She was nominated as Best Writer at the Lux Style Awards (2019) and Hum Style Awards (2019).

== Filmography ==
=== Television ===
- Khaani
- Khuda Mera Bhi Hai
- Baandi
- Surkh Chandni
- Damsa
- Dil Kiya Karay
- Pinjra
- Kaisi Hai Ye Ruswai

=== Films ===
- Maan Jao Naa
