= Voice Over Man =

Pakistani web-television show

- Genre: Talk show
- Created by: Wajahat Rauf
- Presented by: Wajahat Rauf
- Country of origin: Pakistan
- Original language: Urdu
- No. of episodes: 130

Production
- Executive producer: Shazia Wajahat
- Producer: Wajahat Rauf
- Running time: 15 to 20 minutes
- Production company: Showcase Productions

Original release
- Network: YouTube
- Release: 24 November 2017 – present

Voice Over Man is a Pakistani web television talk show. Voice over man a.k.a. Ata Ehteshamuddin is a character created and enacted by Wajahat Rauf. He has hosted over 70 episodes featuring mainstream celebrities including Mahira Khan, Humayun Saeed, Mehwish Hayat, Hania Aamir, Momina Mustehsan, Iqra Aziz, Aiman Khan, Minal Khan, Asim Azhar, Zara Noor Abbas and many others. The show's over the top humour, unusual questions and the host's antics and theatrics has made it one of the most watched online shows in the sub continent.

== Overview ==
The show is hosted and presented by Wajahat Rauf. It is produced under his banner Showcase Productions. It is released on YouTube by Rauf's official Youtube channel "Showcase TV" on 24 November 2017. The show completed 70 episodes as of 2020.

The show is available for streaming on the YouTube channel "Showcase tv".

== Episodes ==
Episode No	Guest	Date
Episode 1	Ayesha Khan	24 November 2017
Episode 2	Yasir Hussain	9 December 2017
Episode 3	Kubra Khan	15 December 2017
Episode 4	Ali Rehman Khan	22 December 2017
Episode 5	Hareem Farooq	3 January 2018
Episode 6	Asim Azhar	26 January 2018
Episode 7	Adeel Chaudhry & Elnaaz Nourouzi	3 February 2018
Episode 8	Mahira Khan	9 February 2018
Episode 9	Adnan Siddiqui	23 February 2018
Episode 10	Sanam Saeed	3 March 2018
Episode 11	Adnan Malik	9 March 2018
Episode 12	Aamina Sheikh	16 March 2018
Episode 13	Shehzad Sheikh	30 March 2018
Episode 14	Humayun Saeed	21 April 2018
Episode 15	Syra Yousuf	28 April 2018
