= Noor Khan =

Noor Khan may refer to:

- Malik Nur Khan (1923–2011), Commander-in-Chief of the Pakistan Air Force
- Noor Alam Khan (born 1972), Pakistani politician
- Noor Inayat Khan (1914–1944), Allied special agent in the second world war
- Noor Khan (actress) (born 1994), Pakistani television actress
- PAF Base Nur Khan, a major Pakistan Air Force airbase located in Rawalpindi, Punjab province.
