= Kinza Malik =

Pakistani actress

- کنزہ ملک
- Born: Kinza Malik Awan; 8 March 1972 (age 54); Lahore, Pakistan
- Occupation: Actress
- Years active: 1990 – present
- Children: 3

Kinza Malik is a Pakistani actress. She is known for her roles in dramas Qayamat, Sammi, Alif Allah Aur Insaan, Ishqiya, Phaans and Neeli Zinda Hai.

== Early life ==
She was born on 8 March 1972 in Lahore, Pakistan.

== Career ==
She made her acting debut in a PTV drama in 1990. She is known for her roles in the dramas Adhi Dhoop, Chingaarian, Kalmoohi and Bhool. She has also appeared in dramas Gustakh Ishq, Aik Thi Rania, Dar Si Jaati Hai Sila, Ishq Tamasha, Sammi and Alif Allah Aur Insaan. Since then she has appeared in dramas Sanwari, Baandi, Saraab, Lashkara, Qayamat, Ishqiya and Neeli Zinda Hai, and Phaans. In 2011 she appeared in the movie Khamosh Raho.

== Personal life ==
Kinza is married and has three children.

== Filmography ==
=== Television ===
Year	Title	Role	Network
1996	Patay Di Gall (Ajj Di Kahani)	Sakeena	PTV
2003	Pooray Chaand Ki Raat	Jannat	PTV
2005	Adhi Dhoop	Iqra	PTV
2006	Chingaarian	Aliya Begum	PTV
2008	Mishaal	Saif-un-nisa	PTV
2010	Kalmooni	Safia	PTV
2011	Afsar Be-Kar-E-Khas	Shakeela	PTV
2011	Zindagi	Nayla	PTV
2012	Dasht-e-Muhabbat	Hamida	PTV
2012	Wafa Hum Nibhain Gay	Zartaj Begum	PTV
2012	Khalida Ki Walida	Naila	PTV
2012	Zindagi Ki Rah Mein	Shehla	PTV
2013	Bhool	Mona	PTV
2013	Mera Ishq Bhi Tu	Zeba Begum	PTV
2013	Muhabbat Weham Hai	Seemi	PTV
2013	Heer Ranjha	Rani	PTV
2013	Chadar	Samar	Urdu 1
2014	Ladoon Mein Pali	Bisma's mother	Geo TV
2015	Maamta	Zainab	ARY Digital
2015	Pardes	Arslan's mother	Hum Sitaray
2016	Bhai	Sajida	A-Plus
2017	Farz	Mehak's mother	PTV
2017	Namak	Safia	PTV
2017	Aik Thi Rania	Kausar	Geo Entertainment
2017	Mohabbat Khawab Safar	Mustafa's mother	Hum TV
2017	Gustakh Ishq	Mumtaz	Urdu 1
2017	Sammi	Bilqis	Hum TV
2017	Alif Allah Aur Insaan	Razia	Hum TV
2017	Dar Si Jaati Hai Sila	Tullo	Hum TV
2018	Lashkara	Bubly's mother	ARY Digital
2018	Ishq Tamasha	Rushna's aunt	Hum TV
2018	Sanwari	Ujala's mother	Hum TV
2018	Baandi	Farhan's mother	Hum TV
2019	Inkaar	Zulekha	Hum TV
2019	Aas	Atiya	TV One
2019	Bharam	Saima Afaaq	Hum TV
2019	Mehboob Aapke Qadmon Main	Sunaina's mother	Hum TV
2020	Saraab	Asfandyar's mother	Hum TV
2020	Ishqiya	Mrs. Siddique	ARY Digital
2020	Chamak Damak	Rameen's mother	Hum TV
2021	Qayamat	Afiyah	Geo TV
2021	Dikhawa Season 2	Salma	Geo Entertainment
2021	Phaans	Shakeela	Hum TV
2021	Neeli Zinda Hai	Meharbano	ARY Digital
2021	Bechari Qudsia	Hajra	Geo Entertainment
2021	Mohabbat Daagh Ki Soorat	Mohsina	Geo TV
2022	Mein Aisi Kiun Hun	Zara's mother	Express Entertainment
2022	Yeh Na Thi Hamari Qismat	Shireen	ARY Digital
2022	Makafaat Season 4	Noshi's mother	Geo Entertainment
2022	Wabaal	Faraz's mother	Hum TV
2022	Guddu	Safiya	Geo Entertainment
2022	Qalandar	Rahat	Geo Entertainment
2022	Mere Damad	Arbaaz's mother	Hum TV
2023	Kacha Dhaga	Maya's mother	Hum TV
2023	Heer Da Hero	Marina	Geo Entertainment
2023	Jeevan Nagar	Zulekha	Green Entertainment
2023	Khumar	Atiya (Extended Special Appearance)	Geo Entertainment
2023	Adawat	Rashida	ARY Digital
2023	Jaan-e-Jahan	Abida	ARY Digital
2024	Ishqaway	Suraiya	Geo Entertainment
2024	Bayhad	Azra	Geo Entertainment
2024	Jaan Nisar	Fehmida	Geo Entertainment
2024	Girhein	Samina	Geo Entertainment
2024	Tauba	Farzana	Geo Entertainment
2024	Ishq Hua	Maheen	Geo Entertainment
2024	Aye Ishq-e-Junoon	Kulsoom	ARY Digital
2025	Humraaz	Farheen	Geo Entertainment
2025	Pathar Dil	Nargis	Geo Entertainment
2025	Shikanja	Zakiya	Geo Entertainment

=== Telefilm ===
Year	Title	Role
2023	Fakhroo Ki Dulhaniya	Naila
2024	Jodi Ban Gayi	Nasreen

=== Film ===
Year	Title	Role
2011	Khamosh Raho	Malkin
