= Gustakh Ishq =

2017 Pakistani television series

- Genre: Drama
- Written by: Mustafa Ayub
- Directed by: Furqan T Siddiqui
- Starring: Zahid Ahmed; Iqra Aziz; Noor Khan
- Country of origin: Pakistan
- Original language: Urdu
- No. of seasons: 1
- No. of episodes: 24

Production
- Producer: Moomal Shunaid
- Running time: 35-45 minutes
- Production company: Moomal Productions

Original release
- Network: Urdu 1
- Release: 12 August – 12 December 2017

Gustakh Ishq (lit. impudent passion) is a Pakistani television series premiered on Urdu 1 on 12 July 2017. It is produced by Moomal Shunaid under her production banner Moomal Productions with Rafay Rashdi as a managing partner. It features Zahid Ahmed, Iqra Aziz and Noor Khan.

== Plot ==
The story revolves around lead protagonist Najaf (Iqra Aziz), a bright girl from a middle-class background, living in Hyderabad in a modest environment with her much younger step-sisters, father Quddos (Firdous Jamal) and step-mother Khalda (Annie Zaidi). Khalda has never truly accepted Najaf as a daughter and tries to keep her away from her sisters as well. Najaf frequently visits Moosa Bhai at a nearby mosque to seek advice on dealing with the difficulties and loneliness in her life. Najaf's life changes when the affluent young owner of her college, Sikander Iqbal (Zahid Ahmed), orders her expulsion due to a misunderstanding. Quddos takes up a job in Saudi Arabia and Najaf is sent to live with her maternal uncle, Rashid, and his family.

Najaf is mistreated by Rashid's wife, Kinza, who sees Najaf as an extra mouth to feed. Kinza's son Zubair takes a liking to Najaf. Sikandar is also known to the family and on a visit to his house, Najaf meets his niece, Dua. It is revealed that Sikandar's sister Naima became estranged from their father Iqbal after she married a middle-class man. She died after giving birth to Dua and left her in Sikandar's care. Sikandar is very protective of Dua and fulfills all her wishes. He ends up hiring Najaf as Dua's governess after the two strike up an instantaneous friendship. Najaf moves in to the Iqbals' house and brings positive changes in Dua's health.

Najaf and Sikandar initially clash on how they should care for Dua but finally start coming to an agreement. Meanwhile, Sikandar's childhood friend Maliha has been in love with him for a long time. Sikandar, however, insists that they remain friends as he feels they are very different people. In the meantime, Zubair proposes marriage to Najaf, having fallen in love with her, but she refuses saying she sees him only as a cousin and nothing more. Rashid reveals to Najaf that Maliha is, in fact, her own twin sister and was adopted by a woman named Samina when she was a baby.

Iqbal and Samina plot to force Sikandar to become engaged to Maliha for their own reasons. Sikandar remains aloof despite the engagement and as he discovers more about Najaf, gradually falling for her. Having been brought up by the well-to-do Samina, Maliha takes an instant dislike to Najaf and her increasing closeness to Sikandar over their love and concern for Dua. Discovering how Samina and Iqbal used their children for their own egos, Sikandar eventually calls off his engagement with Maliha and promptly proposes to Najaf, who he has fallen in love with. Najaf refuses, appalled by the idea of robbing her own sister's happiness. She leaves her job and returns to her Mamu's place.

After several attempts by Samina to bring Maliha and Sikandar together and Maliha's hateful words for Najaf, Sikandar is forced to reveal to Maliha that she and Najaf are sisters. Eventually, Sikandar visits Rashid Mamu with a proposal for Najaf's hand in marriage and assures Najaf that even if she were to say no, he wouldn't get back together with Maliha. After this admission, Najaf accepts and the two are married. However, Maliha, who has been pretending to be a good sister and friend to Najaf, secretly resolves to win Sikandar, but is unsuccessful at the end. After facing a tragedy in the form of death of Dua, Najaf leaves the house as she believes that she will lose her sister too if she doesn't surrender Sikandar to her. Sikander finds Najaf at her house and declares his love for her. Maliha accepts defeat. Najaf also declares her love for Sikander and they live happily ever after.

== Cast ==
- Zahid Ahmed as Sikandar Iqbal
- Iqra Aziz as Najaf Quddus
- Noor Khan as Maliha
- Firdous Jamal as Abd-ul-Quddus Sahab
- Abid Ali as Malik Iqbal
- Khalid Zafar as Rashid Sahab (Najaf's maternal uncle)
- Annie Zaidi as Khalida
- Danial Afzal Khan as Zubair Rashid
- Kinza Malik as Mumtaz (Zubair's mother)
