= Badbakht =

Pakistani television show

- Genre: Drama; Thriller
- Written by: Huda Atif; Sheeba Atif
- Directed by: Emran Kalim Malick; Naveed Ali Khan
- Starring: Sabeena Syed; Fahad Shaikh; Furqan Qureshi
- Country of origin: Pakistan
- Original language: Urdu
- No. of episodes: 52

Production
- Executive producers: Fahad Mustafa; Dr. Ali Kazmi
- Running time: 35-45 minutes
- Production company: Big Bang Entertainment

Original release
- Network: ARY Zindagi
- Release: 26 March – 17 September 2018

Bad Bakht (transl. Unlucky) is a Pakistani family drama premiered on ARY Zindagi on 26 March 2018. It is produced by Fahad Mustafa under their banner Big Bang Entertainment. It stars Sabeena Syed and Fahad Shaikh in lead roles.

== Cast ==
- Sabeena Syed as Amal, daughter of Javed & Kulsoom
- Fahad Shaikh as Armaan Abid Ali, son of Abid & Husna
- Furqan Qureshi as Khurram, Sughra's son
- Natalia Awais as Alizeh, Armaan's younger sister
- Kanwar Nafees as Faisal Abid Ali, Armaan's elder brother
- Adnan Jilani as Javed, Amal's father
- Faiza Gillani as Kulsoom, Amal's mother
- Manzoor Qureshi as Abid Ali, Armaan's father and Javed's brother
- Tabbasum Arif as Husna, Armaan's mother and Kulsoom's sister
- Noshaba Javed as Sughra, Javed and Abid's sister
- Esha Noor as Ayesha, Sughra's younger daughter
- Saba Khan as Sumaiyya, Sughra's elder daughter
- Kiran Abbasi/Maria Malik as Nida, Faisal's wife
- Aroha Khan as Nimra, Javed's second wife
- Iqra Manzoor as Sadia, Amal's friend
- Zeeshan Ali Shah as Sameer, Alizeh love interest
- Mehboob Sultan as Sultan, loves Nida but harasses her when she married Faisal
- Ahad Khan as Rameez, Ayesha's love interest
- Rehana Kaleem as Shahid's mother (guest appearance)
- Ismat Zaidi as Nida's mother (guest appearance)
- Zubair Akram as Shahid, Sumaiyya's husband (guest appearance)
- Sameera Hassan as Sameer's mother (guest appearance)
