= Usman Qadir =

Pakistani cricketer (born 1993)

Personal information
- Born: 10 August 1993 (age 33); Lahore, Punjab, Pakistan
- Height: 5 ft 10 in (178 cm)
- Batting: Left-handed
- Bowling: Right-arm leg break
- Role: Bowler
- Relatives: Abdul Qadir (father); Sulaman Qadir (brother); Sobia Khan (wife) (m. 2018); Umar Akmal (brother-in-law)

International information
- National side: Pakistan (2020–2023)
- Only ODI (cap 230): 7 April 2021 v South Africa
- T20I debut (cap 88): 7 November 2020 v Zimbabwe
- Last T20I: 7 October 2023 v Bangladesh

Domestic team information
- Years: Team
- 2010: Zarai Taraqiati Bank Ltd.
- 2012: Lahore Eagles
- 2013/14: National Bank of Pakistan
- 2017: Lahore Qalandars
- 2018/19: Western Australia (squad no. 7)
- 2018/19: Perth Scorchers
- 2019/20–present: Central Punjab (squad no. 91)
- 2020–2021: Multan Sultans
- 2022–2023: Peshawar Zalmi
- 2022/23–2023/24: Sydney Thunder

Career statistics
Competition	T20I	FC	T20
Matches	23	12	73
Runs scored	31	288	216
Batting average	7.75	20.57	12.70
100s/50s	0/0	0/1	0/0
Top score	18*	52	36
Balls bowled	408	1,005	1,408
Wickets	29	15	75
Bowling average	19.06	51.40	24.17
5 wickets in innings	0	0	0
10 wickets in match	0	0	0
Best bowling	4/13	2/5	4/13
Catches/stumpings	5/–	6/–	14/–
Medal record
Representing Pakistan
Men's Cricket
Asian Games
Bronze medal – third place	2010 Guangzhou	Team
- Source: ESPNCricinfo, 25 September 2022

Usman Qadir (Urdu: عثمان قادر; born 10 August 1993) is a former Pakistani International cricketer. He was part of the bronze medal-winning team at the 2010 Asian Games in Guangzhou, China. He made his international debut for the Pakistan cricket team in November 2020. On 3 October 2024, he announced his retirement at the early age of 31.

== Personal life ==
Usman Qadir is the son of Abdul Qadir, one of Pakistan's foremost leg spinners. His uncle Ali Bahadur and brothers Imran, Rehman, and Sulaman Qadir have all played first-class cricket.

He's the brother-in-law of fellow cricketer Umar Akmal, who married his sister Noor Amna in 2014.

In May 2018 he married stage and film actress Sobia Khan, born in Karachi but performing stage in Lahore, who has also done some Pashto movies.

== Domestic career ==
In November 2010, Usman Qadir was part of the team at the Asian Games in Guangzhou, China which won a bronze medal by beating Sri Lanka in the 3rd place playoffs.

Encouraged to come to Australia by Darren Berry, he played for the Adelaide Cricket Club in South Australia in the 2012–13 season. In September 2018, Qadir signed a contract to represent the Perth Scorchers in the Big Bash League as an overseas player. Despite not being offered an initial state contract, on 26 September 2018, Qadir made his debut for Western Australia against Victoria in the 2018-19 JLT One-Day Cup. He assisted Western Australia to the victory, taking 3/50. Later that same day, Qadir cited his intentions to gain Australian citizenship and represent Australia at the 2020 ICC World Twenty20. He stated “I want to play for Australia definitely, 100 per cent.”

In August 2020, he was named in Central Punjab's squad for the 2020–21 Pakistan domestic season.

== International career ==
In October 2019, he was named in Pakistan's Twenty20 International (T20I) squad for their series against Australia, but he did not play. In January 2020, he was again named in Pakistan's T20I squad, this time for their series against Bangladesh. In October 2020, he was named in a 22-man squad of "probables" for Pakistan's home series against Zimbabwe. On 29 October 2020, he was named in Pakistan's One Day International (ODI) squad for the first match against Zimbabwe. He made his T20I debut for Pakistan, against Zimbabwe, on 7 November 2020, picking up his first ever international wicket. In November 2020, he was named in Pakistan's 35-man squad for their tour to New Zealand. In March 2021, he was named in Pakistan's ODI squad for their series against South Africa. He made his ODI debut for Pakistan, against South Africa, on 7 April 2021.

In September 2021, he was named as one of three travelling reserve players in Pakistan's squad for the 2021 ICC Men's T20 World Cup.

Qadir formally announced his retirement from international cricket on 3 October 2024.
