= Surkh Chandni =

Pakistani television series

- Genre: Drama; Crime
- Written by: Asma Nabeel
- Directed by: Shahid Shafaat
- Starring: Sohai Ali Abro; Asad Siddiqui; Osman Khalid Butt; Mansha Pasha
- Country of origin: Pakistan
- Original language: Urdu

Production
- Producers: Humayun Saeed; Shahzad Nasib; Samina Humayun Saeed; Sana Shahnawaz
- Camera setup: Multi-camera setup
- Running time: 40 minutes
- Production companies: Six Sigma Plus; Next Level Entertainment

Original release
- Network: ARY Digital
- Release: 12 June – 24 September 2019

Surkh Chandni (Urdu: سرخ چاندنی, lit. 'Red moonlight') is a 2019 Pakistani crime-drama television series produced by Humayun Saeed, Shahzad Nasib, Samina Humayun Saeed, and Sana Shahnawaz under the production banners Six Sigma Plus and Next Level Entertainment. It is directed by Shahid Shafaat and written by Asma Nabeel. The series originally started airing on ARY Digital on 11 June 2019, and the last episode was shown on 24 September 2019.

The story focuses on the subject of acid violence, with Sohai Ali Abro as Aida, an acid attack survivor, and Asad Siddiqui as the perpetrator. It also has Osman Khalid Butt as Aida's love interest and Mansha Pasha as Aida's sister-in-law (antagonist).

== Plot ==
The story starts with Aida, who loves her cousin Amaan, and he also loves her. They both want to marry each other. However, Jawad, a guy from Aida's neighbourhood, sends his proposal for marriage to Adia's home, which she rejects. Amaan comes with his mother, who decides to marry earlier due to this incident, to which the family agrees. On the other hand, Jawad, in a fit of fury, doesn't accept that Aida has rejected his proposal and decides to take revenge. He makes a plan and incorporates Aida's sister-in-law, Shumaila, into it. He asks Shumaila to bring her to the beauty parlour on her wedding day and throws acid on her.

One side of her face burns completely and is admitted to the hospital. Amaan and his mother take full care of her and support her. Jawad worries his name will be revealed as a preparator but pulls Shumaila on his side as she is the only one who has seen the attacker. He fulfills her desires, which she couldn't due to poverty.

After getting discharged from the hospital, Aida returns home. Everyone in her neighbourhood blames her, and her brother Mukhtar doesn't believe her when her people question her character. She tells her mother that Jawad has done this and forbids her to tell it to anyone. Her mother tells it to Amaan, who decides to bring his end but fails. They lose the case in court due to a lack of preparation and Shumaila's deception. Shumails goes against Aida, which undermines her honour further.

== Cast ==
- Sohai Ali Abro as Aida
- Osman Khalid Butt as Amaan
- Hassan Ahmed as Mukhtar
- Mansha Pasha as Shumaila
- Asad Siddiqui as Jawad
- Huma Nawab as Safina; Amaan's mother
- Rashid Farooqui as Badar; Aida's father
- Lubna Aslam as Rukhsana; Aida's mother
- Gul-e-Rana as Humaira; Jawad's mother
- Rashida Tabbasum as Rehana, a social worker
- Hajra Khan as Aida's lawyer
- Saleem Mairaj as Jawad's lawyer

== Reception ==
In an article by Dawn Images, the reviewer praised powerful moments, the chemistry of the lead couple and the finale for sensitively dealing with the issue of acid attacks but criticised the pace. Express Tribune lauded the direction of Shafaat for portraying the realistic journey of the survivor, the performances of the cast members and Nabeel's script. Hareem Zafar of Youlin Magazine praised Abro and Butt's performances and raw and realistic depiction of the household.

== Accolades ==
Year	Awards	Category	Recipient	Result	Ref.
February 7, 2020	Pakistan International Screen Awards	Best Television Writer	Asma Nabeel	Nominated	
