= Chalawa (TV series) =

- Genre: Supernatural; Mystery
- Written by: Shahid Nizami
- Directed by: Najaf Bilgrami; Shamoon Abbasi (episode 1-8)
- Starring: Noor Zafar Khan; Ali Ansari; Naveen Waqar
- Theme music composer: Syed Adeel Ali
- Opening theme: "Ek Chalawa" by Alycia Dias; Lyrics by S.K. Khalish
- Country of origin: Pakistan
- Original language: Urdu
- No. of seasons: 1
- No. of episodes: 22

Production
- Producers: M. Nadeem J. Umer Mukhtar
- Production location: Pakistan
- Camera setup: Multi-camera setup
- Running time: 37-38 Minutes
- Production companies: MD Productions; NJ Productions

Original release
- Network: Hum TV
- Release: 8 November 2020 – 4 April 2021

Chalawa (Urdu: چھلاوا, lit. 'Nightfire/A type of Jinn') is a Pakistani supernatural horror drama series directed by Najaf Bilgrami and Shamoon Abbasi and premiered on Hum TV on 8 November 2020. It is produced by M. Nadeem J. and Umer Mukhtar under MD Productions and NJ Films. The drama stars Noor Zafar, Ali Ansari and Naveen Waqar in the lead.

== Plot ==
Chalawa is a supernatural story of a young girl named Sawera who is possessed by birth by a Chalawa (a type of supernatural demon) having the ability of betrayal and illusion. Her father Aamir had died before her birth but little did she know that Professor Hamdani was behind the betrayal who on the other hand seemed to be a savior to her mother Mahnoor, earlier in her childhood, after he "helped" get rid of the Chalawa named Sarnash from Sawera. Later on, she gets to know that she's not a normal human being but a Psychic Medium by birth who can see and feel paranormal entities, and after practice and embracing her abilities, she was also able to do astral projection, mind control and many other abilities. These powers were inherently transferred from her father. The drama also highlights the link between psychic abilities and the Ottoman Empire.

- Sawera's all powers:
- Mediumship (Communicating with demons and spirits)
- Telepathy
- Astral Projection
- Mind Control
- Telekinesis
- Energy Healing
- Divination & Clairvoyance

== Cast ==
=== Main ===
- Noor Zafar Khan as Sawera Ahmed Turk
- Naveen Waqar as Mahnoor; Sawera's mother
- Ali Ansari as Harib Khanzada / Sarnash (when possessed by him)
- Adnan Jaffar as Professor Faraz Hamdani
- Usama Khan as Sarosh / Kaafur (when possessed by the Chalawa Kaafur)

=== Recurring ===
- Tahir Jatoi as Azlaan; a Jinn who was made a well-wisher to Mahnoor and later helped Sawera
- Fawad Jalal as Amir Ahmed Turk; Sawera's father
- Samina Ahmed as Khala / Dadi
- Naveed Raza as Fawaad
- Emmad Butt as Sarosh's father
- Unknown as Mehak; Sarosh's mother
- Tabbasum Arif as Tehmina, Harib's mother
- Sohail Masood as Sarfarz, School's principal
- Zain Ullah as Zayn
- Hina Sheikh as the wife of Principal
- Anoushey Rania Khan as Sawera (Young)
- Ashir Ali Khan as Sarnash/Chalawa (Young)
