= Azmaish =

Pakistani drama television serial

- Title screen
- Genre: Drama
- Written by: Sameena Aijaz
- Directed by: Fajr Raza
- Starring: Kinza Hashmi; Yashma Gill; Fahad Shaikh
- Country of origin: Pakistan
- Original language: Urdu
- No. of episodes: 62

Production
- Producers: Dr. Ali Kazmi; Fahad Mustafa

Original release
- Network: ARY Digital
- Release: 19 May – 17 September 2021

Azmaish (Urdu: آزمائش, lit. 'Trial') is a Pakistani television drama series written by Sameena Aijaz and produced by Dr. Ali Kazmi and Fahad Mustafa under their banner Big Bang Entertainment. It was aired on ARY Digital. The main cast of the drama includes Kinza Hashmi, Yashma Gill, and Fahad Shaikh.

== Cast ==
- Yashma Gill as Shiza
- Kinza Hashmi as Nimra (Shiza's step-sister)
- Fahad Shaikh as Basit
- Furqan Qureshi as Rohan (Tufail's nephew)
- Minsa Malik as Samreen (Shiza's sister)
- Shahood Alvi as Tufail (Shiza & Samreen's father)
- Laila Wasti as Almas (Shiza's step-mother)
- Gul-e-Rana (Tufail's sister)
- Mehwish Qureshi as Saima
- Affan Shah as Rafay
- Fauzia Mushtaq as Rabia's mother
- Abdullah Khan as Basit's friend
