= Khamosh Raho =

2011 film by Altaf Hussain

Khamosh Raho (Pakistani film)
- Directed by: Altaf Hussain
- Written by: Nasir Adeeb
- Produced by: Ghafoor Butt
- Starring: Shaan Shahid; Juggan Kazim; Ghulam Mohiuddin; Kinza Malik
- Cinematography: Ali Jan
- Music by: M.Arshad
- Production companies: Eveready Studios; Ghafoor Films
- Distributed by: Eveready Studios
- Release date: 26 December 2011
- Country: Pakistan
- Language: Urdu
- Box office: Rs. 0.16 crore (US$5,700)

Khamosh Raho is a 2011 Pakistani Urdu language film directed by Altaf Hussain. It stars Shaan Shahid and Juggan Kazim in lead roles.

== Plot ==
Ghulam Mohiuddin, plays an undefeated attorney who happens to have hit the wrong note with a criminal top dog named Chandia. Mohiuddinson (Sheraz Ghafoor) is profoundly in love with the evil, sadistic villain's daughter (Mariam Khan); the lawyer also has another son (Shaan Shahid) who runs away from home to come home two decades later only to find his mother fall sick when she first sees him. Then there's Chandia's evil police deputy stepbrother, who wants his son married to Chandia's daughter.

== Cast ==
- Shaan Shahid
- Juggan Kazim
- Arbaz Khan
- Sheraz Ghafoor
- Mariam Khan
- Bahar Begum
- Naghma
- Asif Khan
- Kinza Malik as Malkin
- Chacha Kunjar

== Music ==
=== List of tracks ===
No.	Title	Singer(s)	Length
1.	"Tere Honton Ko Salaam (DJ Chino Remix)"	Rahat Fateh Ali Khan	03:33
2.	"Menu Te Pyara Tu Lagna (DJ Chino Remix)"	Rahat Fateh Ali Khan & Humaira Channa	03:08
3.	"Aitbaar Karti Hoon (Version 1)"	Amir Ali & Humaira Channa	04:33
4.	"Khamosh Raho"	Rahat Fateh Ali Khan	08:23
5.	"Ishq Mein Pagal"	Rahat Fateh Ali Khan	05:41
6.	"Tere Ishq Vich Rangi"	Rahat Fateh Ali Khan & Humaira Channa	05:45
7.	"Challa Challa Pa De"	Humaira Channa	05:30
8.	"Menu Te Pyara Tu Lagna"	Rahat Fateh Ali Khan & Humaira Channa	04:14
9.	"Aitbaar Karti Hoon (Version 2)"	Humaira Channa & Rafaqat Ali Khan	04:34
10.	"Ishq Mein Pagal (Duet)"	Rahat Fateh Ali Khan & Humaira Channa	05:41
11.	"Tere Honton Ko Salaam"	Rahat Fateh Ali Khan	04:48
