= Khuda Mera Bhi Hai =

Pakistani television serial

- Genre: Drama
- Written by: Asma Nabeel
- Directed by: Shahid Shafaat
- Starring: Ayesha Khan; Syed Jibran; Furqan Qureshi; Saba Hamid; Alyy Khan; Mehmood Aslam; Hira Tareen; Imran Ashraf; Irsa Ghazal; Mariam Saleem
- Country of origin: Pakistan
- Original language: Urdu
- No. of episodes: 26

Production
- Producer: Sana Shahnawaz
- Production locations: Karachi, Sindh
- Running time: 35-38 minutes
- Production companies: Six Sigma Plus; Next Level Entertainment

Original release
- Network: ARY Digital
- Release: 22 October 2016 – 10 April 2017

Khuda Mera Bhi Hai (Urdu: خدا میرا بھی ہے transl. God is mine too) is a Pakistani drama serial that aired on ARY Digital from 22 October 2016 to 10 April 2017. The serial is written by Asma Nabeel, directed by Shahid Shafaat and produced by Sana Shahnawaz. The title soundtrack has been composed and sung by Waqar Ali. It stars Ayesha Khan, Syed Jibran, Furqan Qureshi, Saba Hamid, Alyy Khan, Mehmood Aslam, Hira Tareen and others.

== Overview ==
The drama revolves around Mahagul (played by Ayesha Khan), a mother who gives birth to an intersex child named Noor (played by Furqan Qureshi), and the resulting challenges she faces in her family and society – where acceptance of the third gender remains a taboo. Noor's father, Zain (played by Syed Jibran) refuses to accept the baby and leaves his wife.

Mahagul is a conscientious, strong woman who envisions equal opportunities and fair treatment for her child like any other normal being. She provides him a privileged upbringing and education while challenging societal norms. She is joined in her mission by Noor's tutor Mikaeel (played by Alyy Khan), who becomes his caretaker and treats him like his own son.

The serial sheds light on the stereotypes, gender discrimination and marginalisation that intersex people face within Pakistani society, and their identity crisis.

== Cast ==
- Ayesha Khan as Mahagul, the mother of an intersex child named Noor
- Syed Jibran as Zain, Mahagul's divorced husband and father of Noor
- Furqan Qureshi as Noor, the intersex character and protagonist
- Saba Hamid as Savera, Mahagul's mother and the leader of an NGO
- Alyy Khan as Mikaeel, Noor's tutor and caretaker
- Hira Tareen as Kashmala, Zain's second wife
- Mehmood Aslam as Hassan, Zain's father
- Irsa Ghazal as Arshi, Zain's mother
- Imran Ashraf as Zaahir, Zain's younger brother and Noor's paternal uncle
- Mariam Saleem as Sanam, Mahagul's best friend and Zaahir's love interest
- Tabbasum Arif as Hina, Sanam's mother
- Maha Hasan as Rana, Mahagul's family friend

== Reception ==
=== Critical reception ===
The serial has received critical acclaim for its bold story line, and the "important questions" it raises regarding communal attitudes towards transgender people in Pakistan. Mahwash Badar of The Express Tribune called it a "game changer", while praising the themes touched by the drama such as "domestic abuse, how divorce is considered taboo, social pressures, and most importantly, the rights of transgender people and intersex individuals in the Pakistani society." While reviewing negatively, The News commented that the series lacked the depth and sensitivity required to deal with the subject.
