= Sobia Khan =

Pakistani actress

Sobia Usman
- Born: 24 June 1991 (age 35); Karachi, Sindh, Pakistan
- Other name: Sobia Usman
- Years active: 2012–present
- Known for: television dramas
- Spouse: Usman Qadir (m. 2018)
- Children: 4

Sobia Usman (born 24 June 1991) is a Pakistani film actress known for her works predominantly in Pashto cinema, along with Punjabi, and Urdu films. She also works in plays and television.

== Personal life ==
Sobia was born on 24 June 1991 or 1994 in Karachi, Pakistan.

In May 2018, she married Pakistani cricketer Usman Qadir, the son of former Pakistan leg spin bowler Abdul Qadir. The actress has four daughters: Hoorain Zahra Usman Qadir, Alenoush Zahra, Aylin Zahra and Romaisa Zahra Usman Qadir.

== Career ==
Sobia started her artistic career with a stage play in al-Hamra, after that she continued to work in theaters, TV serials and films. She has worked in more than 40 film, among them the Syed Noor film Chain Aye Na.

== Filmography ==
#	Year	Title	Director	Language	Notes
1	2012	Armaan	Liaqat Ali Khan	Pashto	debut
2	2012	Fakhar-e-Afghan	Arshad Khan	Pashto	
3	2012	Ghaddar	Liaqat Ali Khan	Pashto	
4	2012	Qasm	Arbaaz Khan	Pashto	
5	2012	Dushmani	Arbaaz Khan	Pashto	
6	2013	Inteha	Arbaaz Khan	Pashto	
7	2013	Pikhoray Badmash	Arshad Khan	Pashto	
8	2013	Mast Malang	Nadir Khan	Pashto	
9	2013	Love Story	Nadir Khan	Pashto	
10	2013	Munafiq	Saleem Murad	Pashto	
11	2013	Sarkar	Arshad Khan	Pashto	
12	2013	Zama Arman	Liaqat Ali Khan	Pashto	
13	2013	Shart	Liaqat Ali Khan	Pashto	
14	2013	Gandagir	Nadir Khan	Pashto	
15	2013	Ziddi Pakhtun	Nadir Khan	Pashto	
16	2014	Haramkhor	Qaiser Sanober	Pashto	
17	2014	Peindu Prince	Ajmal Malik	Punjabi	Punjabi film debut
18	2014	Dastan	Hassan Askari	Pashto	
19	2014	Azari	Arshad Khan	Pashto	
20	2014	Jawargar	Arshad Khan	Pashto	
21	2014	Zwe Da Badamala	Nadir Khan	Pashto	
22	2014	Zayam Kakkay Khan	Arshad Khan	Pashto	
23	2015	Charta Khanan Charta Malangan	Arshad Khan	Pashto	
24	2015	Mayin Kho Lewani Vi	Arbaaz Khan	Pashto	
25	2015	Pakhtun Pa Dubai Kay	Arshad Khan	Pashto	
26	2015	Ma Chera Ghareb Sara	Arshad Khan	Pashto	
27	2015	Zoye Da Bad-Amla	Nadir Khan	Pashto	
28	2015	Malang Pa Dua Rang	Arshad Khan	Pashto	
29	2015	Iqrar	Shahid Usman	Pashto	
30	2015	Tezab	Shahid Usman	Pashto	
31	2017	Griftar	Nadir Khan	Pashto	
32	2017	Mirasan	Shahid Rana	Punjabi	
33	2017	Sta Mohabbat Me Zindagi Da	A. K. Khan	Pashto	
34	2017	Gul-e-Jana	Liaqat Ali Khan	Pashto	
35	2017	Chain Aye Na	Syed Noor	Urdu	Urdu film debut
36	2017	Sholay	Shahid Rana	Urdu	
37	2019	Sahil		Urdu	filming
