= Dil Awaiz (2022 TV series) =

2022 Television series

- Title screen
- Urdu: دل آویز
- Genre: Drama
- Written by: Madiha Shahid
- Directed by: Mazhar Moin
- Starring: Kinza Hashmi; Affan Waheed; Seemi Raheel; Kashif Mahmood; Azfar Rehman
- Country of origin: Pakistan
- Original language: Urdu
- No. of episodes: 41

Production
- Producers: Abdullah Kadwani; Asad Qureshi
- Production company: 7th Sky Entertainment

Original release
- Network: Geo Entertainment
- Release: 6 May – 10 June 2022

Dil Awaiz (Urdu: دل آویز, transl. Charming) is a 2022 Pakistani television drama series that aired on Geo Entertainment, written by Madiha Shahid, directed by Mazhar Moin and produced by Abdullah Kadwani and Asad Qureshi. The cast includes Azfar Rehman, Kinza Hashmi, Affan Waheed, Seemi Raheel and Kashif Mahmood in a lead role.

== Plot summary ==
This is a story of a young girl named Dil Awaiz who despite living in her father's house is treated as an orphan and is deprived of love and care. Dil Awaiz’s father, Shahab Uddin is an influential and wealthy businessman who keeps his distance from his firstborn, Dil Awaiz due to her mother's past. Things take an unexpected turn when a handsome, young man Sikandar enters Dil Awaiz's life and once again she is expected to compromise and sacrifice herself in order to save her family's honour and respect.

== Cast ==
- Kinza Hashmi in dual roles as Dil Awaiz and Sitara (Dil Awaiz's mother; a dancer)
- Affan Waheed as Sikandar
- Javeria Abbasi Roshan Ara
- Ayesha Gul as Durdana
- Kashif Mehmood as Nawab Shahbuddin, Dil Awaiz's father
  - Asim Mehmood as Young Nawab Shahbuddin
- Sabeena Farooq as Fariya
- Seemi Raheel as Akka Bibi
- Yasra Rizvi as Tammana Khanum
- Qudsia Ali as Maryam
- Jinaan Hussain as Gaiti
- Raeed Muhammad Alam as Kashan
- Fazila Qazi as Sikandar's mother
- Farhan Ally Agha as Sikandar's father
