= Kinza Hashmi =

Pakistani actress (born 1997)

- Born: Lahore, Pakistan
- Occupations: Film actress; model
- Years active: 2014—present

Kinza Hashmi is a Pakistani actress who works in Urdu television. First appearing on-screen in TV commercials, she made her debut in 2014 with Adhura Milan and later appeared in several other serials. Hashmi is best known for portraying a grey role of Rushna in Hum TV's romantic drama Ishq Tamasha (2018), which led to her nomination for Best Actress in a Negative Role at the Hum Award.

== Early life ==
Hashmi born in Lahore, Pakistan.

== Filmography ==
=== Films ===
Key
†	Denotes films that have not yet been released

Year	Title	Role	Notes	Ref.
2022	Ruposh	Zunaira Ashfaq	Debut film; Released on Geo TV	
2024	Kattar Karachi	Tanya		
2026	Sheroes	Aiman Gillani	Segment: Punch	
2027	Mohabbat †	TBA	Debut in Bangladeshi film; Filming	

=== Television ===
Year	Title	Role	Network	Ref.
2014	Adhura Milan	Nayab		
2015	Maikay Ko Dedo Sandes	Sharmin	Har Pal Geo	
2016	Manchahi	Mishal	Har Pal Geo	
2017	Sangsar	Roshni	Hum TV	
2017	Faraib	Nimra		
2017	Mor Mahal	Banki	PTV Home	
2017	Mohabbat Tumse Nafrat Hai	Fajar Aurangzeb		
2017	Tishnagi Dil Ki	Natasha		
2017	Daldal	Sania		
2017	Rani	Rani		
2018	Lamhay	Aiman		
2018	Ishq Tamasha	Rushna		
2018	Seerat	Maria		
2019	Gul-o-Gulzar	Gulzar		
2019	Deewar-e-Shab	Joya		
2019	Tu Mera Junoon	Hayat		
2019	Tera Yahan Koi Nahin	Mariam		
2020	Uraan	Malika		
2020	Tum Se Kehna Tha	Yusra		
2021	Mohlat	Maham		
2021	Azmaish	Nimra		
2022	Dil Awaiz	Dil Awaiz		
2022	Wehem	Eshal	Hum TV	
2022	Hook	Haya Zaman	ARY Digital	
2023	Mere Ban Jao	Azmiya	Hum TV	
2024	Kaisi Hai Ye Ruswai	Shaila	Express Entertainment	
2024	Hum Dono	Wafa Asad	Hum TV	
2025	Shirin Farhad	Shirin	Hum TV	
2026	Leader	Rubab	Hum TV	

== Awards and nominations ==
Year	Award	Category	Work	Result	Ref.
2019	Pakistan International Screen Awards	Best Actress Female	Gul-o-Gulzar	Nominated	
