= Tabbasum Arif =

Pakistani actress

- Born: 12 December 1968 (age 57); Lahore, Pakistan
- Education: University of Lahore
- Occupation: Actress
- Years active: 1990 – present
- Children: 2

Tabbasum Arif is a Pakistani actress. She is known for her roles in the dramas Chalawa, Ishq Hai, Khalish, Bikhray Moti, Faryaad, Khuda Mera Bhi Hai and Mah-e-Tamaam.

== Early life ==
She was born in 1968 on 12 December in Lahore, Pakistan and completed her studies from University of Lahore.

== Career ==
She made her acting debut in the 1990 on PTV. She was noted for her roles in dramas Ishq Hamari Galiyon Mein, Sarkar Sahab, Mohabbat Humsafar Meri, Humnasheen, Ru Baru, Mohabat Behta Darya and Rukhsaar. Tabbasum also did several advertisements in Dubai and Thailand. She later appeared in dramas Yeh Mera Deewanapan Hai, Khuda Gawah, Aik Pal, Amrit Aur Maya, Ishq-e-Benaam, Gila, Badnaam and Khuda Mera Bhi Hai. Tabbasum also appeared in telefilm Kyun Pyaar Nahi Milta with Imran Abbas, Rubina Ashraf, Maira Khan and Hassan Niazi. Since then she appeared in dramas Badbakht, Maa Sadqey, Khalish, Tere Bina, Saiyaan Way, Thays, Dil-e-Bereham, Naqab Zan, Chalawa, Bikhray Moti and Ishq Hai.

== Personal life ==
Tabbasum is married and has two children.

== Filmography ==
=== Television ===
Year	Title	Role	Network	Ref(s)
2007	Sarkar Sahab	Waqar's wife	ARY Digital	
2008	Khawab Tooth Jate Hain	Sharmeen	Geo TV	
2009	Buri Aurat	Farha	Geo TV	
2010	Adhoore Dastaan	Meher Ashfaq	Hum TV	
2010	Kahe Ko Biyahee Bides	Tania	Geo Entertainment	
2011	Phir Chand Pe Dastak	Rozi's mother	Hum TV	
2012	Roza Kay Rozay	Shehzori	ARY Zindagi	
2012	Gharana Fasana	Faria	Geo TV	
2012	Band Baje Ga	Sunny's aunt	ARY Digital	
2013	Humnasheen	Khalda	Hum TV	
2013	Mohabbat Humsafar Meri	Rukhsana	TV One	
2013	Rukhsaar	Mahrukh's mother	Geo Entertainment	
2013	Ishq Hamari Galiyon Mein	Nuzhat	Hum TV	
2014	Ru Baru	Salima	Hum TV	
2014	Mohabat Behta Darya	Alvina	TV One	
2014	Aik Pal	Umair's mother	Hum TV	
2014	Yeh Mera Deewanapan Hai	Nighat	A-Plus	
2015	Ishq-e-Benaam	Zobia	Hum TV	
2016	Pashemaan	Nadia	Express Entertainment	
2016	Khuda Gawah	Maliha	TV One	
2016	Gila	Atiqa	Hum TV	
2017	Mera Aangan	Zubaida	ARY Digital	
2017	Badnaam	Fahad's mother	ARY Digital	
2017	Amrit Aur Maya	Noreen	Express Entertainment	
2017	Ghareeb Zaadi	Sajda	A-Plus	
2017	Khuda Mera Bhi Hai	Hina	ARY Digital	
2017	Tere Bina	Khalda	Geo TV	
2018	Maa Sadqey	Sidra's mother	Hum TV	
2018	Badbakht	Husna	ARY Zindagi	
2018	Saiyaan Way	Rabi	TV One	
2018	Mah-e-Tamaam	Sarwat	Hum TV	
2018	Ishq Bepanah	Maleeha	Express Entertainment	
2018	Lakhon Mein Aik	Begum Sahiba	TV One	
2019	Khalish	Neelofar	Geo Entertainment	
2019	Dil-e-Bereham	Sheheryar's mother	A-Plus	
2019	Mala Mir	Bazid's mother	A-Plus	
2019	Naqab Zan	Tai Jan	Hum TV	
2020	Chalawa	Tehmina	Hum TV	
2020	Faryaad	Sakeena	ARY Digital	
2020	Shokhiyaan	Beena	Geo Entertainment	
2020	Bikhray Moti	Jehangir's mother	ARY Digital	
2020	Aulaad	Naghma	ARY Digital	
2021	Azmaish	Nazish	ARY Digital	
2021	Ishq Hai	Maryam	ARY Digital	
2022	Teri Rah Mein	Samina	ARY Digital	
2022	Roag	Anas's mother	Hum TV	
2022	Betiyaan	Nighat	ARY Digital	
2024	Haq Mehar	Sakina	Geo Entertainment	
2024	Qarz-e-Jaan	Qudsia	Hum TV	
2025	Na Tum Jano Na Hum	Sophia	Green Entertainment	
2026	Mere Pass Raho Tum	Zubaida	Express Entertainment	

=== Film ===
Year	Title	Role
2015	Aik Aur Aik Gyarah	Maami
2016	Tujh Se Naam Hamara	Amna Ahmed
2017	Sab Say Mushkil Shadi	Aliya Eshaan
