= Mariam Saleem =

Pakistani actress

Mariam Saleem is a Pakistani actress. She made her on-screen debut in 2015 and has acted in television series, theater plays, web-series as well as a film. Slaeem made her cinematic debut in 2017 opposite Shehroz Sabzwari with Chain Aye Na.

== Filmography ==
=== Film ===
- Chain Aye Na

=== Television ===
| Year | Title | Role | Notes |
|---|---|---|---|
| 2015 | Vasl-e-Yaar | Minahal | |
| 2016 | Khuda Mera Bhi Hai | Sanam | |

=== Web series ===
| Year | Title | Role | Notes |
|---|---|---|---|
| 2020 | Mein Aur Woh | Mehrunnisa | stream on Deikho |
| 2020 | Ek Jhoothi Love Story | Shazia | released on ZEE5 |
| 2026 | Farar | Tanya | |
