= Kuch Ankahi =

Pakistani television series

- Original title: کُچھ اَن کہی
- Genre: Social; romance; comedy
- Written by: Syed Mohammad Ahmed
- Directed by: Nadeem Baig
- Starring: Sajal Ali; Bilal Abbas Khan; Sheheryar Munawar; Syed Mohammad Ahmed; Irsa Ghazal; Mira Sethi; Qudsia Ali; Vaneeza Ahmed; Ali Safina
- Theme music composer: Azaan Sami Khan
- Opening theme: "Kuch Ankahi" by Azaan Sami Khan
- Composer: Azaan Sami Khan
- Country of origin: Pakistan
- Original language: Urdu
- No. of episodes: 27

Production
- Executive producer: Nadeem Baig
- Producers: Humayun Saeed; Shehzad Naseeb
- Production companies: Six Sigma Plus; Kashf Foundation

Original release
- Network: ARY Digital
- Release: 7 January – 15 July 2023

Kuch Ankahi (transl. Something Unsaid) is a Pakistani television series written by Syed Mohammad Ahmed and directed by Nadeem Baig. Kashf Foundation produced it in collaboration with Humayun Saeed's Six Sigma Plus. The series has an ensemble cast of Sajal Ali, Bilal Abbas Khan, Sheheryar Munawar, Syed Mohammad Ahmed, Mira Sethi, Qudsia Ali and Vaneeza Ahmed. It first began airing on 7 January 2023 on ARY Digital.

The series is about women's social progress by showcasing women from all strata of society, including a poor maid, a middle-class real estate agent, and a rich businesswoman. The plot revolves around the aspirations and trajectories of three sisters. Besides several other themes, it mainly focuses on posthumous wealth distribution and men's roles. The series is a tribute to Haseena Moin, the late legendary Pakistani television writer.

== Plot ==
Aaliya Agha (Sajal Ali) is a middle-class young woman living with her parents, Agha Jaan (Syed Mohammad Ahmed) and Shammo Begum (Irsa Ghazal) and her two sisters, Samiya (Mira Sethi) and Taniya (Qudsia Ali). Aaliya is headstrong, works in real estate and is the breadwinner of her home. Agha Jaan has been contesting a case for the ownership of his inherited house, which, according to him, was given solely to him by his late father. Agha Jaan has no written proof of being gifted this house before his father's death, to which his other siblings object and demand their rightful portions. His morals don't allow him to illegally solve this issue (though he got a chance) and he also doesn't have enough money to buy the house in full. He faces many trials and tribulations while trying to get his daughters married, fight this court case and give his children their due rights.

Salman Saeed (Bilal Abbas Khan) is a middle-class young man who is also a real estate agent and is Aaliya's professional rival. He lives with his mother Almas (Annie Zaidi), and eventually rents the upper portion of Aaliya's house after discovering and rekindling their mothers' long-lost friendship. Salman suffers from separation anxiety after his father left and takes emotional stances and morals very seriously. Aaliya, on the other hand, is too busy and worried about her home's financial crisis and is trying everything in her power to buy her house. Salman and Aaliya work for a real estate firm named Sehrish, whose rival is her half-brother Asfar (Sheheryar Munawar). Asfar is a tough and stone-hearted man, and he isn't on good terms with Sehrish and their father since his father never cared about Asfar.

Samiya has been engaged to Saif-ur-Rehman (Ali Safina) by Shammo for two years, but everyone tries to convince Shammo that Saif isn't a good guy after Aaliya sees Saif with another girl somewhere, which Shammo discourages. It is revealed that the girl is Saif's possessive girlfriend Shagufta, whom he met at his office. Agha Jaan's younger sister Sofia (Vaneeza Ahmed) and nephew Shakeel (Adnan Samad Khan) arrive to take their rightful portions of the house, but they start to change their minds while living in the house. Sofia was married once, but her husband Safdar had died.

Agha Jaan meets Thanvi (Babar Ali), who originally helped Sofia run away years ago from her marriage to a man named Adil. She then went on to marry her late husband, so he asks Thanvi about reuniting with Sofia. Under pressure, Samiya and Saif get married, with Shagufta introducing herself to Samiya at the wedding. On the other hand, the house's servant Meena has her issues at home, with her husband always taking her payment and her daughter Neha becoming a model and eventually putting Deepak to work at a clothes shop, where Deepak gets sexually harassed by the owner. Out of fear, Deepak comes to live with the Agha family, and Deepak gets help from everyone with his studies, especially Sofia. Eventually, Thanvi comes with a marriage proposal for Sofia, and he offers to pick up and drop Deepak to and from school, making Sofia jealous. Tania's friend Mona is revealed to have been harassed by a member of her college management, so Tania stands up for her, and Mona becomes more confident.

Eventually, Aaliya visits Sehrish at her office, where she meets Asfar for the first time and tells him off, to which Asfar gets intrigued by Aaliya. He then finds her profile and offers her a job at his office. Aaliya is hesitant at first, but Sehrish encourages her to join him. When Aaliya tells Salman this, Salman becomes angry at her. Salman joins Sehrish to rival Asfar and Aaliya. After a while, Asfar starts to grow feelings for Aaliya. Meanwhile, Saif's mother is very harsh with Samiya at first, but after Samiya brings changes to the household, she becomes soft toward Samiya. Asfar finds out about Agha Jaan and Shammo's wedding anniversary and self-invites himself to the celebration, to which Sofia and Shammo become impressed by Asfar. Asfar asks Aaliya the next day that he wants to move to her house, but for that, Salman has to leave. Salman prepares tickets for him and Almas for Canada. Aaliya manages to arrange a lot of money to pay Agha Jaan's siblings for their portions of the house, including Sofia and Shakeel, so they get to keep the house for themselves.

Saif and Shagufta still meet, but they decide to run away. After Saif runs away, his mother informs Shammo of this, making Shammo regret her decision to force Samiya to marry Saif forcefully. Shammo asks for forgiveness from Samiya, and Samiya forgives her. A friend of Saif's finds him at the train station and convinces him to return home. Saif returns to his mother and then goes to Samiya's house twice, but both times, Samiya requests some time. Shagufta, after realising Saif has left her, decides to change herself and become an actress, just like her father was an actor before her.

Asfar's father goes to the hospital, so Asfar asks Aaliya for companionship to take care of his father. Eventually, his father makes it out alive, and Asfar reconciles with his father. After much convincing, Sofia finally agrees to marry Thanvi, but on the wedding day, she leaves while remembering her late husband. Thanvi eventually finds her at the train station and convinces her that he will be there for her as a friend. Asfar meets Salman first, and they talk about Aaliya. Asfar mentions that Aaliya has helped him reconcile with his family. He says she is extraordinary, and he will never let her go. Salman retorts that Aaliya and he love each other. Asfar realises that Salman is a good guy and deserves Aaliya. Asfar meets Aaliya afterwards and tells her the same thing he told Salman, that she loves Salman and deserves him.

During the wedding, Almas gives Salman a ring to give to Aaliya on this night. He meets Aaliya and tells her what Asfar told him, and Aaliya tells Salman what Asfar told her. Salman gives Aaliya that ring, and she tells him to put it on her finger. Her mother calls her upstairs, and she playfully runs away, with Salman following her. Everyone then starts to dance, stopping when they see Salman grab Aaliya's hand and put the ring on her finger, with everyone clapping afterwards. He goes to kiss her hand, but she flicks his forehead while laughing. The show ends with Asfar closing his ring box in sadness.

== Cast ==
=== Main ===
- Sajal Ali as Aaliya Agha - Agha Jaan & Shammo's daughter; Samiya & Taniya's sister; Salman's love interest.
- Bilal Abbas Khan as Salman Saeed - Almas's son; Aneela's brother; Aaliya's love interest.
- Sheheryar Munawar as Asfar Motiwala - Raheem's son; Sehrish's older half brother; grows unrequited feelings for Aaliya.
- Mohammad Ahmed as Agha Jaan - Aaliya, Samiya & Taniya's father; Sofia, Sohail and Tufail's brother; Shammo's husband.
- Irsa Ghazal as Shammo Begum - Samiya, Aaliya & Taniya's mother; Agha Jaan's wife.
- Mira Sethi as Samiya Agha - Agha Jaan & Shammo's daughter; Aaliya & Taniya's older sister; Saif's wife.
- Qudsia Ali as Taniya Agha - Agha Jaan & Shammo's daughter; Samiya & Aaliya's younger sister.
- Vaneeza Ahmad as Sofia Agha - Agha Jaan, Sohail and Tufail's younger sister; Safdar's widow; Adil's ex-fiance; Thanvi's wife.
- Adnan Samad Khan as Shakeel Tufail Agha - Tufail's son; Agha Jaan, Sohail and Sofia's nephew; Taniya’s one-sided lover.
- Moona Shah as Meena Harish - Harish's wife; Neha and Deepak's mother; housemaid of Aaliya's house.
- Annie Zaidi as Almas Saeed - Salman and Aneela's mother; Adil's sister.
- Alina Abbas as Sehrish Motiwala - Raheem's daughter; Ibrahim's ex-wife; Zain's mother; Asfar's younger half-sister.
- Yousuf Bashir Qureshi as Raheem Motiwala - Asfar and Sehrish's father.
- Babar Ali as Thanvi - Sofia's husband.
- Asma Abbas as Zareena - Saif's mother.
- Ali Safina as Saif ur Rahman - Samiya's husband; Zareena's son.
- Uroosa Siddiqui as Shagufta Afzal - Afzal's daughter; Saif's ex-girlfriend.
- Mohammed Ehteshamuddin as Afzal - Shagufta's father.
- Abdullah Abid Malik as Ali - Taniya's childhood bestfriend.
- Emaan Khan as Neha Harish - Harish and Meena's daughter; Deepak's sister.
- Saqib Sumeer as Harish - Meena's husband; Neha and Deepak's father.
- Falak Shahzad Khan as Deepak Harish - Harish and Meena's son; Neha's brother.
- Hammad Farooq as Paramesh - Harish's nephew (brother's son).
- Shabir Murad as Munawar - Agha Jaan's lawyer.
- Musaddiq Malek as Rafi - Salman's childhood bestfriend and business partner.
- Janice Tessa as Mona - Taniya's friend.

=== Guest cast ===
- Nadeem Baig as motorist (Episode 12)
- Ali Tahir as Salman's client (Episode 15)
- Arjumand Rahim as Seema Suhrawardy (Episode 18)

== Production ==
=== Background ===
In July 2021, the head of Kashf Foundation, Roshaneh Zafar revealed that they were developing the concept for their next serial, which will be lighter in mood and with it she hopes to revive the days of Ankahi (1982) and Tanhaiyaan (1985). She further revealed that it will address themes such as population boom, reproductive health of women, domestic violence and family planning.

=== Casting ===
On 11 August 2022, Khan revealed on his Instagram account about his next project, which was tentatively titled Kashf, a production of Six Sigma Plus. Later, Galaxy Lollywood reported that Aly will star opposite Khan in the series directed by Nadeem Baig and written by Syed Mohammad Ahmed. Thus, it marked Aly and Khan's third on-screen appearance together after O Rangreza (2017) and feature film Khel Khel Mein (2021). In November, the official title of the series, Kuch Ankahi was revealed. In conservation with DAWN Images, Sethi revealed that the plot revolves around three sisters and their aspirations; the release date of the series was also revealed.

The first look of the series was unveiled on 23 December 2022.

== Soundtrack ==
"Kuch Ankahi Si Hain Yeh Baatain"

Composition by Azaan Sami Khan
- Released: January 5, 2023
- Label: ARY
- Songwriters: Syed Mohammad Ahmed; Khalish
- Producers: Six Sigma Production; Kashf Foundation

Music video
- "Kuch Ankahi Si Hain Yeh Baatain" on YouTube

The original soundtrack of the show was composed by Azaan Sami Khan, who also performed it and lyrics were by Syed Mohammad Ahmed and Khalish.

Another soundtrack of the series titled "Dildara" by the same performer and music composer, and lyrics by Khalish was released by the network in March 2023. In July 2023, Khan shared the monsoon-mixed version of this soundtrack on his Instagram handle.

== Reception ==
=== Television rating points (TRPs) ===
Date	Ep#	TRPs	Ref.
7 January 2023	1	6.6	
29 April 2023	16	5.1	
27 May 2023	20	9.0	
3 June 2023	21	8.2	
15 July 2023	27	9.8	

=== Critical reception ===
DAWN Images praised the light heartedness and subtle messaging in the series. In a review by The News International, the reviewer praised the comic plot, mother-son relationship dynamic of Khan and Zaidi's characters, Moona Shah and Adnan Samad Khan's performances but mentioned the portrayal of the business work as unrealistic. In an article by Samaa TV, the portrayal of romantic dynamics among all the group age was noted. Express Tribune praised the interaction of Abbas and Sethi's characters in episode 21 for shattering the typical portrayal of In-laws. While comparing it with the most viewed serials of the Pakistani Television of the year 2023, Aurora praised its writing, themes and acting performances. In the year-ender list by Dawn Images, the reviewer praised the performances of the actors and the subtle messaging in the series.
