= Vaneeza Ahmad =

Pakistani actress and model (born 1971)

Vaneeza Ahmed Ali
- ونیزہ احمد
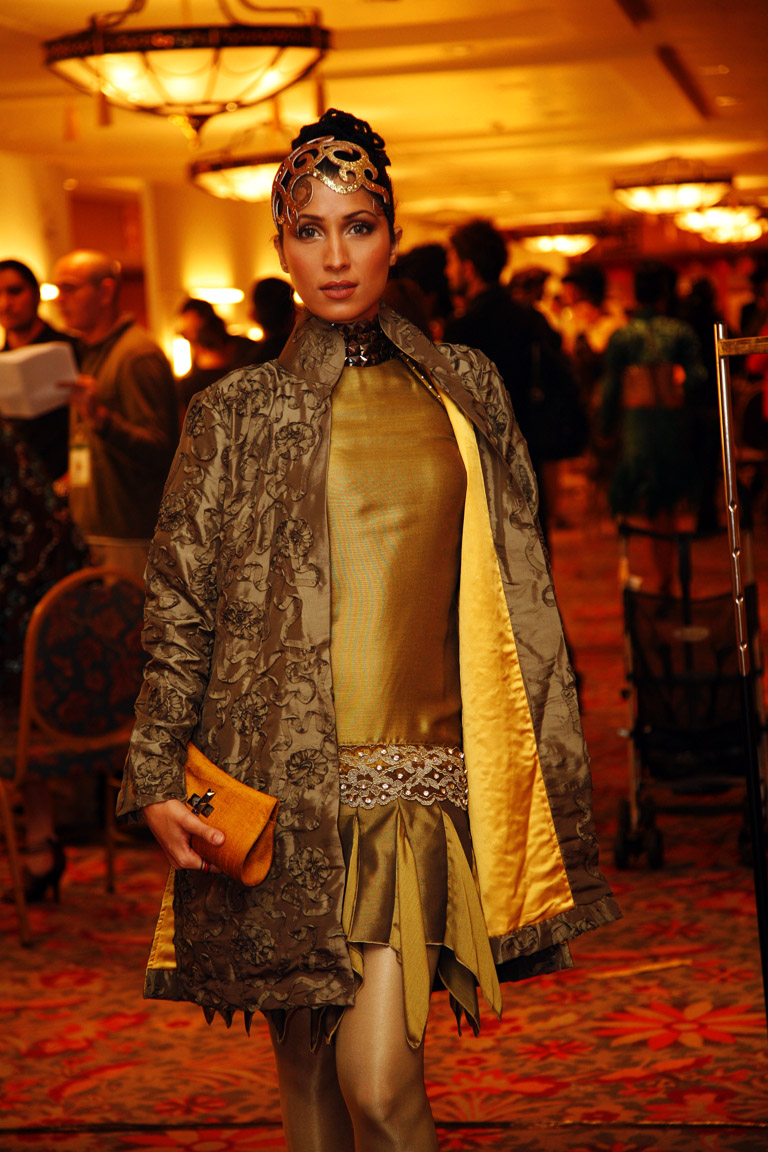
- Vaneeza at an Event
- Born: Vaneeza Ahmed; 24 June 1971 (age 55); Murree, Punjab, Pakistan
- Other name: Vinnie
- Occupations: Actress and model
- Years active: 1994–present
- Height: 168 cm (5 ft 6 in)
- Spouse: Ali Afzal Malik (m. 2010)
- Relatives: Bindiya (aunt)

Vaneeza Ahmad (Urdu: ونیزہ احمد; born 24 June 1971) is a Pakistani model, actress, and occasional singer. As a model she has seen success as the face of brands in Pakistan, and is the first Pakistani model to model for Donna Karan and Calvin Klein.

== Biography ==
=== Early life ===
Ahmad reportedly said to news media that when she was a youngster, the college students those days mostly had three career options – medicine, engineering or teaching. Modelling as a career was not an option for girls back then. Ahmad returned to Pakistan at the age of 18 to attend the Kinnaird College liberal arts university in Lahore and graduated with a bachelor's degree in psychology.

While at University, Ahmad started to model casually. Although not much interested in modelling as a career option, she received offers from various fashion designers, some of whom were notable in the Pakistani fashion industry including the likes of fashion designer Nilofer Shahid.

=== Modelling as a career ===
When designer Nilofer Shahid approached Ahmad, she was unsure of which career to pursue and settled for fashion modeling. In dealings with corporate heads of the entertainment industry, her business acumen was similarly praised.

=== Vaneeza, the brand ===
Ahmad conceived the brand name Vlawn for her range of lawn fabrics. The collection consisted of nine different lawn prints created by designers that included Nomi Ansari, Umar Sayeed and Hassan Sheheryar Yasin. In March 2006, the collection sold-out in a series of exhibitions. In 2011, she continued with her "VLawn" brand of women's lawn suits.

=== Acting and acclaim ===
Ahmad made her acting debut in Jamal Shah's controversial saga Kal and has since acted in Marina Khan's Tum Hi Tau Ho, Janey Anjaney and Tum Say Mil Ker; Armaan; Khayal; and Talaash (Pakistani TV series). She played the founder of Pakistan Muhammad Ali Jinnah's daughter Dina Wadia in Jamil Dehlavi's 1998 biographical film, Jinnah.

On 16 April 2008, Vaneeza Ahmad was selected as one of the Olympic torch bearers when the torch arrived in Islamabad. She was one of the few selected celebrities to hold the torch in the relay out of the chosen 66.

== Personal life ==
She married Islamabad-based businessman Ali Afzal Malik in July 2010 and has two daughters. She also runs her own business. The actress Bindiya and the newscaster Meena Pervaiz are Vaneeza's aunts.

== Filmography ==
=== Films ===
| Year | Title | Role | Ref |
|---|---|---|---|
| 1998 | Jinnah | Dina Jinnah | |

=== Television ===
| Year | Title | Role | Network | Notes |
|---|---|---|---|---|
| | Tum Se Mil Kar | | PTV | |
| 2000 | Tum Hi Tou Ho | | PTV | |
| 2002 | Tere Siwa | | PTV & AAJ TV | |
| 2002 | Phir Youn Love Hua | | Indus Vision, PTV & AAJ TV | |
| 2002 | Sirf Tumhare Liye | | PTV | |
| | Suraj Girhan | | PTV & AAJ TV | |
| | Zanjeer | | PTV | |
| 2001 | Chehrey | | PTV | |
| | Achanak | | | |
| 2013 | Armaan | Nida | Geo TV | Television film |
| | Aisa Bhi Hota Hai | | PTV Home | |
| | Baaghi | | | |
| 2004 | Batain Dil Ki | | PTV | |
| | Chahatein | | | |
| 2006–2014 | Criminal Minds: Beyond Boundaries | Agent Vinnie | ARY Digital, The Musik, CBS, Star Utsav and Star World India | Seasons 1–9 |
| (N/A) | Criminal Minds: Beyond Borders | | CBS | |
| 2003 | Jaane Anjaane | | PTV | |
| | Jannat | | PTV Home | |
| 2008 | Khamoshiyan | | Hum TV | |
| 2008 | Marina Mornings | | ARY Digital | |
| 2008 | Jeena Isi Ka Naam Hai | | TVOne Pakistan | |
| 2009 | Nestlé Nido Young Stars | | | |
| | Na Jaane Keya Ho Gaya | | PTV | |
| 2005 | 1st Indus Drama Awards | | Indus TV | |
| 2006 | Na Tum Apnay Na Dil Mera | | ARY Digital | Telefilm |
| 2006 | Pyar Ho Jaane Do | | TVOne Pakistan | |
| 2007 | Lux Style Awards | | | |
| 2010 | No Reservations | | Dawn News | |
| 2010 | Nadia Hussain lounge | | AKS TV | |
| 2011 | Jago Pakistan Jago | | Hum TV | |
| 2011 | Morning With Hum | | Hum TV | |
| 2011 | Spotlight | | TVOne Pakistan | |
| 2011 | Aks | | Express News | |
| 2011 | E-Tech | | Express News | |
| 2011 | The Sahir Show | | Geo TV | |
| 2011 | The Morning Show | | Express 24/7 TV show | |
| 2013 | Without Shepherds | Self | | |
| 2014 | Veet Miss Supermodel | | Hum Sitaray and Hum TV | |
| 2014 | Morning With Juggun | | PTV Home | |
| 2014 | Mazaaq Raat | | Dunya TV | |
| 2014 | 2nd Hum Awards | | Hum TV | |
| 2014–2018 | Tonite with HSY | | Hum Sitaray and Hum TV | |
| 2015 | Weekend World | | PTV World | |
| 2015 | Good Morning Pakistan | | ARY Digital | |
| 2015 | The Celebrity Lounge | | PTV Home | |
| 2016 | Mehmaan Nawaaz | | See TV | Episode 19 |
| 2016 | Ek Naya Subah With Farah Hussain | | A-Plus TV | |
| 2016 | Samaa Kay Mehmaan | | Samaa TV | |
| 2016 | Sunrise From Istanbul | | See TV | |
| 2016 | 10 Years of Masala | | Hum Masala | |
| 2016 | Eidi Sab Ke Liye | | ARY Zindagi | |
| 2016 | 2017 | Miss Veet Pakistan | | Hum TV and Hum Sitaray |
| Pakistan Ke Liye Geo | 2017 | | Geo TV | |
| The Morning Show | 2017 | | ARY News | |
| Breaking Weekend | 2017 | | ARY Zindagi | |
| 2016–2017 | 2017 | Salam Zindagi | | ARY Zindagi |
| Pond's Miracle Journey | 2017 | | | |
| 2018 | The After Moon Show | | Hum TV | |
| 2018–2019 | Marham | Tajwar | BOL Network | |
| 2019 | Breakfeast @ Home | | PTV Home | |
| 2019 | Star Iftar | | Urdu 1 | |
| 2019 | G Kay Sang | | GNN | |
| 2019–2020 | Ehd-e-Wafa | Faryal; Saad's Mother | Hum TV | |
| 2020 | Rising Pakistan | | PTV Home | |
| 2021 | 16 Years LIVE Telebrations | | Hum TV | |
| 2021 | Hum Women Leaders Award | | Hum TV | |
| 2021 | GMP Shan-e-Suhoor | | ARY Digital | |
| 2021 | Girlee Talks With Huma | | | |
| 2021 | GMP Eid Special | | ARY Digital | |
| | NCIS: Los Angeles | | CBS | |
| | S.W.A.T. | | CBS | |
| 2023 | Kuch Ankahi | Sofia Agha | ARY Digital | |
| 2023 | Subah Se Aagay | Guest | Hum News | |
| 2024 | Hasna Mana Hai | Guest | Geo News | |

=== TV commercials ===
- (1996) | "Aisa Asar Dekhai Ke Bahar Bhi Dhoke Khai | Tibet Snow
- (1997) | "Kyun Ke Yeh Dil Ka Mamla Hai" | Habib Oil
- (2000) | "The World's Best Materess" | Master Celeste
- Sab Say Ghara Doodh | Haleeb Milk
- Pepsi Diet | Pepsi
- Head & Shoulders
- (2001) | "Express Yourself" | Instaphone
- Lipton by Unilever
- (2006) | "Ramzan Mubarak" | Olpers
- (2006) | "50 Years" | LUX by Unilever
- (2007) | Brings People Closer | Indigo by Jazz Pakistan
- (2007) | Subah Bakhair Zindagi | Olpers
- (2008) Sunsilk by Unilever
- (2009) Dettol
- (2010) | "Ghee" | Kissan Oil
- (2011) | "Prints" | V Lawn
- (2016) | "Ghizayat Bhara Har Ghoont" | Olpers
- (2020) | "Khulay To Dil Khulay" | Coca-Cola

=== Reality Shows ===
==== Music videos ====
| Song title | Co-singer | Year |
|---|---|---|
| "Spring Blossom" | | 2007 |
| "Yaad" | Shehzad Roy | 2005 |
| "Na Re Na" | Ali Azmat | 2003 |
| "Bulleya" | Junoon (band) | 1999 |

== Accolades ==
| Ceremony | Category | Result |
|---|---|---|
| 1st Lux Style Awards | Best Model of the Year (female) | Won |
| 4th Lux Style Awards | Best Model of the Year (female) | Won |

== See also ==
- List of Pakistani models
- List of Pakistani actresses
