= Khel Khel Mein =

Khel Khel Mein may refer to:

- Khel Khel Mein (1975 film), an Indian Hindi-language black comedy thriller directed by Ravi Tandon
- Khel Khel Mein (2021 film), a Pakistani historical drama directed by Nabeel Qureshi
- Khel Khel Mein (2024 film), an Indian Hindi-language comedy drama directed by Mudassar Aziz
- "Khel Khel Mein", a 2005 4-episode arc of the Indian TV series CID Special Bureau
- Khel Khel Mein Foundation, an Indian non-profit organisation
