= Maikey Ko Dedo Sandes =

Pakistani television series

- Title screen
- Genre: Soap opera Family drama Romantic drama
- Written by: Shumaila Zaidi
- Directed by: Tehseen Khan
- Opening theme: Koi Maikey Ko Dedo Sandes
- Country of origin: Pakistan
- Original language: Urdu
- No. of episodes: 95

Production
- Camera setup: Multi-camera setup

Original release
- Network: Geo Tv; Geo Kahani
- Release: 17 August – 27 December 2015

Maikey Ko Dedo Sandees (Urdu: میکے کو دیدو سندیس, lit. 'Send word to my family') is a Pakistani soap opera that first aired on Geo Tv on 17 August 2015. It used to air on weekdays (Monday to Friday) at 7:00 p.m. (PST). Repeat telecasts of the soap also aired on Geo TV's sister channel Geo Kahani.

== Cast ==
- Sonia Mishal as Maryam
- Ali Abbas as Ahmer
- Ghulam Mohiuddin as Maryam's father
- Naima Khan as Maryam's mother
- Samina Ahmed as Maryam's grandmother
- Asma Abbas as Maryam's aunt
- Kashif Mehmood
- Abdullah Ejaz
- Kinza Hashmi
- Wahaj Khan

== See also ==
- List of programs broadcast by Geo TV
- Geo TV
- List of Pakistani television serials
- Geo Kahani
