= Fahad Sheikh =

Pakistani actor and media personality (born 1989)

- Born: February 22, 1989 (age 37); Lahore, Punjab, Pakistan
- Occupation: Actor
- Years active: 2011–present
- Notable work: Jalan
- Spouse: Mehreen Sheikh (m. 2012)

Fahad Sheikh is a Pakistani television actor, best known for his lead role as Ahmer in the 2020 ARY Digital television series Jalan. He was also seen in drama serial drama serial Azmaish and Dunk. Before Jalan he appeared in dramas such as Badbakht, Khudparast, and Bandish.

He was also seen in a short film "Nam Kya Rakha?" starring Hajra Yamin and Faizan Shaikh.

== Early life ==
Fahad was born in Lahore into a mixed Punjabi and Kashmiri (through his maternal grandmother) family. Before entering the entertainment industry he had played professional cricket, representing the Pakistan national under-19 team.

== Career ==
Fahad faced challenges early on in his career due to criticisms about his height, Urdu pronunciation and demeanor. His break came with his role in the drama Jalan, which led to subsequent acting offers in Pakistani television. Before starting his career as an actor, Fahad hosted Gyara Number, a television show in Lahore and was managing his clothing business. Fahad attributes much of his success to the guidance and support of Fahad Mustafa, who has acted as a mentor, helping him navigate the industry.

== Personal life ==
Fahad married Mehreen Sheikh, the daughter of Pakistani actress Shahida Mini, in 2012. The couple has two children.

== Filmography ==
=== Television series ===
Year	Title	Role	Network	Ref.
2014	Uff Yeh Mohabbat	Ali	Geo Entertainment	
2016	Waada		ARY Digital	
2016	Haya Kay Rang	Aamir	ARY Digital	
2017	Mubarak Ho Beti Hui Hai	Ahsan	ARY Digital	
2017–2018	Meraas	Ali	ARY Digital	
2018	Badbakht	Zamin	ARY Digital	
2018	Khudparast	Adeel	ARY Digital	
2019	Bandish	Hamza	ARY Digital	
2020	Jalan	Ahmer	ARY Digital	
2020	Dunk	Safeer	ARY Digital	
2020	Ghamandi	Danyal	Express Entertainment	
2021	Azmaish	Basit	ARY Digital	
2022	Betiyaan	Danish	ARY Digital	
2022	Hasrat	Arham	Hum TV	
2023	Wonderland	Rohail	Green Entertainment	
2023	Bojh	Rehan	Geo Entertainment	
2024	Takkabur	Arez	Hum TV	
2024	Hasrat	Junaid	ARY Digital	
2025	Ishq Tum Se Hua	Ahmar	Green Entertainment	
2025	Visaal-e-Ishq	Wahaj	Green Entertainment	
2026	Intekhab	Ayaan	Green Entertainment	

=== Webseries ===
Year	Title	Role	Network	Ref.
2020	Naam Kya Rakha?	Shayan	See Prime	
2022	Radio	Danial	See Prime	
