= Ruposh =

2022 Pakistani Telefilm

- Telefilm Poster
- Genre: Romance film Drama; Action
- Created by: 7th Sky Entertainment
- Written by: Nooran Makhdoom
- Screenplay by: Nooran Makhdoom
- Directed by: Ali Faizan
- Starring: Haroon Kadwani; Kinza Hashmi (Full Cast)
- Music by: Wajhi Farooki
- Country of origin: Pakistan
- Original language: Urdu

Production
- Producers: Abdullah Kadwani; Asad Qureshi
- Camera setup: Multi-camera setup
- Running time: 142 minutes
- Production company: 7th Sky Entertainment

Original release
- Network: Geo Entertainment
- Release: 7 January 2022

Related
- Teri Meri Kahani; Dil Tera Hogaya

Ruposh (Urdu: روپوش) is a 2022 Pakistani romantic telefilm produced by Abdullah Kadwani and Asad Qureshi under their production house of 7th Sky Entertainment. It was written by Nooran Makhdoom and directed by Ali Faizan, starring Haroon Kadwani in lead role opposite Kinza Hashmi. The telefilm premiered on 7 January 2022 in Pakistan on Geo Entertainment.

== Plot ==
A young free-spirited man with past traumatic family experiences comes across a beautiful stranger. Their bitter first encounter triggers his unresolved anger even further. Salaar's excessive token of affection for Zunaira stuns everyone at their university and eventually compels her to surrender to his love. But just when she least expects it, Salaar gets back at her for revenge. His vengeance soon brings him to terms with his true feelings but he is then left with little time to undo his mistake.

== Cast ==
=== Main cast ===
- Haroon Kadwani as Salaar Shah, Zunaira's Love Interest
  - Sajjad Gul as Young Salaar Shah (Child)
- Kinza Hashmi as Zunaira Ashfaq, Salaar's Love Interest

=== Supporting cast ===
- Mehmood Aslam as Ameer Shah (Salaar's father)
- Saba Faisal as Sabeen (Zunaira's mother)
- Hina Khawaja Bayat as Salaar's mother
- Saife Hassan as Ashfaq (Zunaira's father)
- Shabbir Jan as Irfan (Rohail's father & Ashfaq's friend)
- Raeed Muhammad Alam as Rohail Irfan
- Arisha Razi as Zunaira's sister
- Aadi Khan as Zubair, Salaar's Friend
- Zohreh Amir as Farah, Zunaira’s friend
- Mujtaba Abbas Khan as College Student
- Yasir Alam as College Student, Salaar's Enemy
- Hashiam Butt as Doctor (Cameo)
- Wajhi Farooki as Himself in the title song "Ruposh" (Cameo)

== Soundtrack ==
Ruposh consisted of two original soundtracks titled "Ruposh" and "Humraazi". Both the soundtracks are written and performed by Wajhi Farooki while the music composition is done by Wajhi Farooki and Tarun Sharma.The soundtrack has received massive success, the ruposh ost has received more than 100 Million views while humraazi has received 60 million views as of August 2023.

=== Track listing ===
Following is the listing of complete soundtracks of Ruposh.

No.	Title	Lyrics	Music	Artist	Duration
1	Ruposh	Wajhi Farooki	Team Wajhi Farooki	Wajhi Farooki	4:09
2	Humraazi	Wajhi Farooki	Team Wajhi Farooki	Wajhi Farooki, Aishwarya M	4:32

== Reception ==
The television film received countrywide praising for its direction, writing, location, cast and cinematography. Ruposh crossed the milestone of bagging 105 GRPs on the rating chart, the highest in the history of Pakistani telefilms. Following the success of the film, a celebration on 13 March 2022 was organized by the producers, where cast of the film and various artists from the TV industry made an appearance.

=== Digital media ===
Ruposh went on to trend at #1 on YouTube in just three days and exhibited a record-shattering performance of getting the fastest 10 millions views. The telefilm also attained massive success on digital platforms with 327 million+ views on YouTube and more than 250 million+ on TikTok and Instagram.
