= Komal Aziz Khan =

Pakistani actress

- Born: Komal Aziz Khan; Karachi, Sindh, Pakistan
- Occupation: Actress
- Years active: 2015-2021

Komal Aziz (Urdu: کومل عزیز) is a Pakistani television actress known for her role in Ishq-e-Benaam for which she was nominated for Best Soap Actress at Hum Awards. She is also known for her leading role in Bharosa Pyar Tera, Bisaat-e-Dil and Raaz-e-Ulfat.

== Life and career ==
Aziz grew up in a middle-class family and after completing her A levels, she enrolled in IBA Karachi and was suspended from University for three years after she was caught cheating. In an interview at talkshow Rewind with Samina Peerzada, she talked about the flaws in the local education system which is majorly based on rote-learning. Despite the setback, she motivated herself and applied to other institutions including Lahore University of Management Sciences where she was accepted with a 75 percent scholarship.

== Education ==
She eventually attended Kalamazoo College in Michigan, USA, on a full scholarship, where she completed her undergraduate degree in Business and Economics from 2011 to 2015.

== Television ==
| Year | Title | Role | Notes | Ref(s) |
|---|---|---|---|---|
| 2015–2016 | Ishq-e-Benaam | Areeba | Nominated–Hum Award for Best Soap Actress | |
| 2016 | Saheliyaan | Maher | | |
| 2017 | Jithani | Haniya | | |
| 2016–2017 | Bay Khudi | Maryam | | |
| 2017 | Gumraah | Faryal | | |
| 2017–2018 | Zard Zamano Ka Sawera | Rubab | | |
| 2018-2019 | Bisaat e Dil | Ania | | |
| 2018 | Kabhi Band Kabhi Baja | Tara | Episode 23 | |
| 2019 | Bharosa Pyar Tera | Maryam | | |
| 2019–2020 | Mein Na Janoo | Kiran | | |
| 2019 | Haqeeqat | | Episode "Badla" & "Kam Zarf" | |
| 2020 | Raaz-e-Ulfat | Sehba | | |
| 2020-2021 | Kasa-e-Dil | Shireen | | |
| 2021 | Mohlat | Nawera | | |
