= Aadi Khan =

Pakistani actor

Aadi Khan is a Pakistani television actor. He is best known for portraying Waleed Kamil in Hum TV's Chupke Chupke. He had previously appeared in many television series as a child actor. Besides acting in television series, he has acted in over 200 commercials also. Khan is the elder brother of child actor Sami Khan.

== Television ==
| Year | Title | Role | Notes |
|---|---|---|---|
| 2017 | Daldal | Bilal | |
| 2018 | Nibah | Mubashir | |
| 2018 | Kaif-e-Baharan | | |
| 2018 | Lamhay | Saim | |
| 2019 | Kam Zarf | Nabeel | |
| 2019 | Wafa Lazim To Nahi | | |
| 2019–2020 | Ehd-e-Wafa | Malik Shahzaib | |
| 2020 | Aye Mohabbat | | |
| 2020 | Dikhawa | | Episode 14 |
| 2021 | Dikhawa (season 2) | Various | Episodes; "Behawa", "Sanad" |
| 2021 | Chupke Chupke | Waleed Kamil | |
| 2021 | Mohlat | Ehaab | |
| 2022 | Ruposh | Zubair | Telefilm |
| 2022 | Kahan Jao Gay Tum | Saad | |
| 2022 | Dil-e-Veeran | Rayyan | |
| 2022 | Pehchaan | Umer | |
| 2023 | Ehraam-e-Junoon | Subhan "Jugnu" | |
