= Kasa-e-Dil =

Pakistani romantic televisions series

- Title card
- Genre: Romance; Drama
- Written by: Jahanzeb Qamar
- Directed by: Zeeshan Ahmed
- Starring: Affan Waheed; Hina Altaf; Komal Aziz Khan; Ali Ansari; Sukaina Khan
- Theme music composer: Sahir Ali Bagga
- Country of origin: Pakistan
- Original language: Urdu
- No. of episodes: 38

Production
- Producers: Abdullah Kadwani; Asad Qureshi
- Running time: 37 minutes approx.
- Production company: 7th Sky Entertainment

Original release
- Network: Geo Entertainment
- Release: 9 November 2020 – 19 July 2021

Kasa-e-Dil (Urdu: کاسۂ دل, lit. 'Heart as a Begging Bowl') is a 2020–21 Pakistani television series that premiered on 9 November 2020. It was directed by Zeeshan Ahmed and written by Jahanzeb Qamar. It has Affan Waheed, Hina Altaf, Komal Aziz Khan, Ali Ansari and Sukaina Khan in lead roles.

== Plot ==
The film introduces us to first cousins Hatim and Somia who are in love. Hatim's mother (Somia's phupho, or paternal aunt) opposes their relationship. On the Mehndi day of Somia's brother's wedding, she rejects Hatim's proposal and Somia's marriage in front of Somia's parents; this causes her father to suffer a heart attack and die. Later, Somia's brother Nauman marries Raheela (her other phupho’s daughter), but Raheela is in love with Hatim.

Rich businessman Adan falls in love with Somia, but is unable to declare his love. Raheela realises Adan’s feelings; in order to separate Hatim and Somia, she takes advantage of Adan's love for Somia. She creates misunderstandings between Hatim and Somia that lead Hatim to leave Somia on the day of their marriage function. Raheela sends Adan to Somia's room, where Hatim saw them both and called off his marriage. Adan is shocked hearing all this and decides to marry Somia to protect her from the insult. After marriage, he requests Somia to wait in her home until he convinces his mother, to which she agrees.

On reaching his house, his mother uses emotional blackmail to compel him into marrying his cousin Shireen, who is head over heels in love with him, because Adan’s sister will marry Shireen’s brother and her father puts a condition that this marriage will only take place if Adan marries Shireen. After the emotional blackmail, Adan agrees. After some time, he tells Shireen about his first marriage with Somia and brings home Somia, but Shireen troubles Somia too much and feigns innocence in front of Adan. She creates misunderstandings between the two by bringing her past lover Haim. After these misunderstandings, Adan discovers that Somia is innocent and leaves his house with Somia. But Somia convinces him that they should stay with his mother only, to which he reluctantly agrees.

One day, Somia was making tea when Adan comes home, so she leaves the tea and tells the servant to bring her tea in her bedroom. Adan drinks the tea instead and falls to the ground. Later it is discovered that Shireen had poisoned the tea. After coming home from hospital, Adan hears the conversation between Shireen and his mother where his mother tells Shireen to leave their house. After all this, Adan and Somia live happily with his mother.

== Cast ==
- Hina Altaf as Somia
- Affan Waheed as Adan
- Komal Aziz Khan as Shireen
- Sukaina Khan as Raheela
- Rabia Noreen as Fehmida
- Zainab Qayyum as Somia's mother
- Shabbir Jan as Somia's father (cameo)
- Ali Ansari as Hatim
- Haris Waheed as Noman, Somia's brother
- Maryam Noor as Najiya, Adan's sister
- Noor ul Hassan as Shireen's father
- Fazila Qazi as Adan's mother
- Tauqeer Ahmed as Aqsam, Najiya's husband
- Birjees Farooqui as Shaista, Raheela's mother
- Rehma Zaman as Sana, Shireen's friend

== Soundtrack ==
"Kasa-e-Dil"

Single by Sahir Ali Bagga and Hadiqa Kiani
- Language: Urdu
- Released: 16 November 2020
- Recorded: 2020
- Genre: Soundtrack
- Length: 3:00
- Label: Har Pal Geo
- Composer: Sahir Ali Bagga
- Lyricist: Sahir Ali Bagga

Music video
- "Kasa-e-Dil" OST on YouTube

The soundtrack is sung by Sahir Ali Bagga and Hadiqa Kiani. The songs and lyrics are by Bagga.
