= Shirin Farhad (TV series) =

2025 Pakistani television series

- Genre: Period romantic drama
- Written by: Ali Moeen
- Directed by: Asad Mumtaz Malik
- Starring: Farhan Saeed; Kinza Hashmi
- Country of origin: Pakistan
- Original language: Urdu

Production
- Producer: Momina Duraid
- Production companies: MD Productions; Moomal Productions

Original release
- Network: Hum TV
- Release: 26 April – 3 August 2025

Shirin Farhad is a 2025 Pakistani period romantic drama television series written by Ali Moeen and directed by Asad Mumtaz Malik. Produced by Momina Duraid under MD Productions, the series stars Farhan Saeed and Kinza Hashmi in lead roles, alongside Rashid Farooqui, Saleem Mairaj, Ali Tahir and Zhalay Sarhadi. It premiered on Hum TV on 26 April 2025.

Set in the early 1970s against the backdrop of the Pakistani film industry, the series follows Farhad, an aspiring filmmaker who travels from Bahawalpur to Lahore to pursue a career in cinema. There, he meets Shireen, the daughter of a film costume designer who hopes to establish her as an actress. Their relationship develops amid family expectations and the challenges of working in the film industry.

== Cast ==
=== Main cast ===
- Farhan Saeed as Farhad
- Kinza Hashmi as Shireen
- Rashid Farooqui as Master Saifuddin "Master Ji"
- Saleem Mairaj
- Ali Tahir as S. Sultan
- Zhalay Sarhadi as Rozi

=== Supporting cast ===
- Mubashir Mehmood as Ahmad
- Syed Tanveer Hussain as Imdad Hussain
- Rabya Afsar as Iffat
- Irfan Motiwala as Chamman Miyan
- Kanwal Khan as Shamsa
- Ali Sikandar as Golden Bhai
- Rana Majid as Ali
- Ali Rizvi
- Haider Shah
- Neha Khan
- Fouzia Mushtaq
- Shazia Qaiser

== Production ==
The project was developed with the working title of Na Chhura Sako Ge Daman by director Asad Mumtaz Malik during his working on his acting credited Jhok Sarkar (2023).

The first teaser of the serial was released in March 2025.

== Soundtrack ==
The original soundtrack of Shirin Farhad was performed by Ali Zafar.
