= Mohlat =

Pakistani family drama serial

- Genre: Family; Drama; Romance
- Written by: Samira Fazal
- Directed by: Saima Waseem
- Starring: Bushra Ansari; Kinza Hashmi; Sami Khan; Komal Aziz Khan; Usama Khan
- Country of origin: Pakistan
- Original language: Urdu
- No. of seasons: 1
- No. of episodes: 65

Production
- Producers: Abdullah Kadwani; Asad Qureshi
- Running time: 38 minutes approx
- Production company: 7th Sky Entertainment

Original release
- Network: Geo Entertainment
- Release: 17 May – 19 July 2021

Mohlat (Urdu: مہلت, lit. 'Respite') is a 2021 Pakistani family drama soap that premiered on 17 May 2021 on Geo Entertainment, produced by 7th Sky Entertainment of Abdullah Kadwani and Asad Qureshi. It stars Bushra Ansari, Asma Abbas, Sami Khan, Kinza Hashmi, and Komal Aziz Khan in lead roles. Supporting cast includes Usama Khan, Tanveer Jamal, Sabeena Farooq, Javeria Abbasi, Daniyal Afzal, Saife Hassan, Nida Mumtaz, and Sharif Baloch.

Written by Samira Fazal and directed by Saima Waseem, the drama serial aired daily at 9:00pm. Episodes would be uploaded to YouTube by 10:00PM PST.

== Cast ==
=== Main ===
- Komal Aziz Khan as Navera (Dawar's 2nd wife)
- Kinza Hashmi as Maham (Dawar's 1st wife)
- Sami Khan as Dawar (Maham's ex-husband, Navera's husband)
- Usama Khan as Essa (Rida's husband)

=== Supporting ===
- Bushra Ansari as Talat (Dawar's mother)
- Asma Abbas as Zahida (Maham, Rida, and Navera's mother; antagonist turned protagonist)
- Tanveer Jamal as Tahir (Maham, Rida, Navera, and Ehaab's father; antagonist turned protagonist)
- Danial Afzal Khan as Salman (Maham's ex-boyfriend, Maham’s second husband, Maham’s ex- husband)
- Saife Hassan as Fareed (Salman's father)
- Sharif Baloch as Saleem
- Nazia as Nasreen
- Sabeena Farooq as Rida (Navera's sister; Essa's wife, dead)
- Javeria Abbasi as Sadaf (Tahir's 2nd wife)(dead)
- Aadi Khan as Ehaab (Tahir's son)(dead)

== Reception ==
The serial had highest ratings on its time slot throughout its run (all the 65 episodes lead their respective time slots). It is one of the highest rated drama serial of 2021. Audience criticized the same for depiction of Aziz's character as a weak girl for her crying scenes in the serial.

=== Lux Style Awards ===
Ceremony	Categories	Recipients	Result
21st Lux Style Awards	Best TV Long Play	Mohlat	Nominated
