= Abdullah Ejaz =

Pakistani model and television actor

- Born: Abdullah Ejaz; 10 June 1983 (age 43); Lahore, Punjab, Pakistan
- Occupations: Model, television actor
- Relatives: Riaz Ahmad 'Raju' (grandfather); Allauddin (granduncle)

Abdullah Ejaz is a Pakistani model and television actor.

== Family ==
His maternal grandfather, Riaz Ahmad 'Raju', was a director-producer in the 1960s and 1970s, while his maternal great-uncle was the character actor, Allauddin. The family is of Kashmiri descent.

== Career ==
After a modelling career, he first gained recognition as an actor by impersonating in comedic performances the cricketer-turned-politician Imran Khan in the political satire show Hum Sub Umeed Se Hain, making his debut in TV serials with Nail Polish in 2011.

== Television ==
Year	Title	Role	Channel
2011	Nail Polish	Naveed	A-Plus Entertainment
2015	Piya Mann Bhaye	Zawaar	Geo Entertainment
2015	Maikey Ko Dedo Sandes		Geo TV
2015-2016	Tera Mera Rishta		Geo Entertainment
2017	Mera Aangan	Shahvair	ARY Digital
2018	Silsilay	Wahab	Geo Entertainment
2021-2022	Baddua	Ather	ARY Digital

== Awards and nominations ==
- "Best Male Model" at the Lux Style Awards in 2006.
- Nominated for Best Male Model of Year at Lux Style Awards 2011
