= Adhura Milan =

Pakistani television series

- Written by: Noorul Huda Shah (A-Plus TV); Sheeraz Kazi (A-Plus TV); Ayesha Aslam (See TV); Awais Ahmed (See TV); Kaynat Ali (See TV)
- Directed by: Zulfiqar Ali (A-Plus TV); Arshad Altaf (See TV); Ali Sajjad (See TV)
- Opening theme: Shiraz Uppal; Neeti Mohan
- Country of origin: Pakistan
- Original language: Urdu
- No. of episodes: 31 (See TV: 50 episodes)

Production
- Producers: Badar Ikram; Khuarram Rana; Rehan Merchant; Bilal Sharif
- Running time: 38 minutes approx.
- Production companies: Miraqsam Media; IQ Studio

Original release
- Network: A-Plus TV; See TV
- Release: 9 May – 19 September 2014

Adhura Milan (Urdu: ادھورا ملن, lit. 'Incomplete Union') is a Pakistani television series originally aired on A-Plus TV, co-written by Noorul Huda Shah and directed by Zulfiqar Ali. It stars Samina Peerzada, Faisal Rehman, Iffat Rahim, Aly Khan, Jana Malik and Kinza Hashmi in leading roles.

== Cast ==
- Samina Peerzada as Noor ul Ain / Bibi Jan
- Faisal Rehman/Asad Malik as Tabrez Alam
- Iffat Rahim as Noor-ul-Ain
- Usman Peerzada
- Aly Khan as Dilawar Akhtar
- Jana Malik
- Kinza Hashmi as Nayab
- Waseem Tirmazi as Shaan
- Nayyar Ejaz as Sultana
- Khalid Butt as Bakhtawar
- Hiba Aziz as Alishba
- Aamna Malick
- Sara Malik as Sugi
- Soha Malik
