= Betiyaan =

2022 Pakistani television series

- بیٹیاں
- Genre: Family Drama; Soap opera
- Written by: Asma Sayani
- Directed by: Meesam Naqvi
- Starring: Fatima Effendi; Syed Mohammad Ahmed; Mahenur Haider; Tania Hussain; Qudsia Ali
- Music by: SK Salman Khan
- Country of origin: Pakistan
- Original language: Urdu english
- No. of episodes: 71

Production
- Producers: Fahad Mustafa & Ali Kazmi
- Production location: Karachi
- Running time: 40–44 minutes
- Production company: Big Bang Entertainment

Original release
- Network: ARY Digital
- Release: 8 October – 17 December 2022

Betiyaan (Urdu: بیٹیاں) is a Pakistani television family drama aired on ARY Digital from 8 October 2022 to 17 December 2022. It is produced by Fahad Mustafa and Ali Kazmi under Big Bang Entertainment. It stars Fatima Effendi, Syed Mohammad Ahmed, Mahenur Haider, Tania Hussain, Qudsia Ali, Fahad Shaikh and Osama Tahir in lead roles.

It emerged as one of the highest rated serials of Pakistani television for the year 2022. Dubbed in Turkish, it was aired on Kanal 7 in Turkey under title Canim Kizlarim in 2024.

== Cast ==
- Fatima Effendi as Fiza Laiq (main lead actress)
- Fahad Shaikh as Danish
- Mahenur Haider as Ayeza Laiq (younger sister of Fiza)
- Osama Tahir as Saad (Ayeza's husband)
- Tania Hussain as Anum Laiq (Fiza & Ayeza's sister)
- Syed Mohammad Ahmed as Laiq Ahmad (father of Ayeza, Fiza, Haniya, Anum and Komal)
- Qudsia Ali as Haniya Laiq (another sister of Fiza)
- Emaan Khan as Komal Laiq (youngest sister of Fiza)
- Beena Masroor as Laiq's mother (grandmother of Ayeza, Fiza, Haniya, Anum and Komal)
- Javeria Saud as Naghma (Laiq's sister)
- Sabeena Syed as Shumaila (Danish's friend)
- Tabbasum Arif as Nighat (Saad's mother)
- Shehryar Zaidi as Akhram (Danish's Father)
- Sabahat Ali Bukhari as Jahanara (Danish's mother)
- Sajjad Paul as Faris (Danish's Brother)
- Saeed Faridi as Farooq (Salma's husband)
- Fahima Awan as Salma (Farooq's wife)
- Ali Kureshi as Faiq (Anum's husband)
- Sabahat Adil as Hameeda (Faiq's mother and Anum's mother-in-law)
- Abdullah Khan as Ali (Saad's friend)

== Accolades ==
Year	Awards	Category	Nominee	Result	Ref(s).
2023	Lux Style Awards	Best Television Long Play	Betiyaan	Won	
