= Chain Aye Na =

Pakistani film

Chain Aye Na Film
- Chain Aye Na or Chain Aye Na poster
- Directed by: Syed Noor
- Written by: Syed Noor
- Produced by: Jawed Siddiqi; Naim Haroon Sakhia
- Starring: Shehroz Sabzwari; Sarish Khan; Adil Murad; Sobia Khan; Mustafa Qureshi; Atiqa Odho; Danish Nawaz; Behroze Sabzwari
- Cinematography: Irfan Mirza
- Edited by: Syed Umar Shafiq
- Music by: M. Arshad & Iffi-K (UK)
- Production companies: Hollywood Impressions & Paragon Entertainment Combined Production
- Distributed by: Cinepax
- Release date: 11 August 2017
- Running time: 149 min
- Country: Pakistan
- Language: Urdu

Chain Aye Na (Punjabi: چین آئے نہ meaning "State of Restlessness") is a 2017 Pakistani Romance film written and directed by Syed Noor. It is an unofficial remake of the 1986 Pakistani film Beqarar starring Babra Sharif and Faisal Rehman.

== Plot ==
Rayyan (Shehroz Subzwari) is a young musician who falls in love with Ruba (Sarish Khan) at first sight at a wedding. Ruba has no interest in Rayyan, as she is happily engaged to Murad. Rayyan moves to Karachi to pursue Ruba, joins a band, and tries to ingratiate himself with her father.

== Cast ==
- Shehroz Sabzwari as Rayyan
- Sarish Khan as Ruba
- Adil Murad as Murad
- Nadeem Baig
- Behroze Sabzwari
- Mustafa Qureshi
- Atiqa Odho
- Danish Nawaz
- Waqar Godhra
- Sobia Khan
- Mariam Saleem

== Release ==
The film was released on 11 August 2017 in Pakistan, the Gulf States, China, the United States, and Canada.

== Reception ==
The film received negative reviews from critics. It performed poorly at the box office, and was considered a commercial failure.
