= Ishq-e-Benaam =

2015 Pakistani television series

- عشقِ بے نام
- Genre: Drama; Romance; Soap opera
- Written by: Adam Azeen
- Directed by: Saife Hassan
- Starring: Shamil Khan; Komal Aziz Khan; Kiran Tabeir; Humaira Bano; Tabassum Arif; Fazal; Aisha; Junaid Awan; Mizna Waqas; Urooj Abbas; Faheem Tijani; Jahanzeb Khan; Afshan Qureshi; Mahajabeen; Uzma Beg; Khalid Malik; Mariyam Nafees; Anwaar Sheikh
- Theme music composer: Sahir Ali Bagga
- Opening theme: "Ishq-e-Benaam" by Harshdeep Kaur and Asad Riaz
- Original language: Urdu
- No. of episodes: 102

Production
- Running time: 15–20 minutes

Original release
- Network: Hum TV
- Release: 9 November 2015 – 29 March 2016

Ishq-e-Benaam (Urdu: عشق بے نام; transl. Unnamed love) is a Pakistani romantic soap opera that aired every Monday to Friday from 9 November 2015 on Hum TV. The drama came to an end on 29 March 2016, and was succeeded by Hum's new soap Haya Ke Daaman Main.

== Plot ==
The story unfolds in an impoverished household where Naheed's struggle and fight with her poverty seem to grow with each passing day. Her daughters Khushbu and Areeba are of age and their only brother is handicapped, unable to support the family. throughout this drama the brother (Nabeel) sacrifices the money saved up for his operation, for his family e.g. at Khusbu's wedding, when Areeba gets shot... The family tries to get loans so that Khusbu's wedding goes well, in order to do this Areeba decides to sell her phone. but, ends up getting arrested by the police, were Soha sees Areeba and automatically judges her for being a mobile phone thief. Areeba pleads to the police officer just to make one call and so she calls Arsal, he rushes to the police station and takes her home. Khusbu signs the niqah and a few minutes after Moiz's (her husband) girlfriend appears, and congratulates him for his wedding, then drinks poison. he rushes her to the hospital. The family's sufferings grow worse when Khushbu receives a call from Moiz who says that his mom, brother and her sisters are to be blamed for forcing him to get married and divorces her before even leaving the marriage lawn. Khusbu blames Areeba for her bad destiny and starts to ruin her life (e.g. cut her pictures). Areeba, who considers poverty to be their biggest enemy, decides to step out of the house in search of a better future.

Areeba sets off to her interview but Arsal's bike breaks down, so she goes in a rickshaw but the rickshaw slightly collides with Kesar's car. She says that the loss is hers because she is getting late for her interview. She sets off walking. Kesar gives money to the rickshaw driver for the damages and sees Areeba breaking the heel of her sandal. he offers Areeba a ride to the place she is getting interviewed, Kesar's Group of Industries. Unfortunately, Soha who is interviewing recognises Areeba and says there is no place for mobile snatchers in this business and tells the guards to throws her out of the building. Kesar the head of the business, notices that Areeba didn't get the job and gets tells the employee to contact Areeba that she got the job.

Areeba is surprised when she finds out she got the job and in happiness buys a box of sweets (meeti). shes goes to work sees that kesar is the owner and is surprised. soha complains to her mother that her dad doesn't want her to get involved in the business and so offered Areeba the job.

There is a large rivalry between soha and Areeba after this scene e.g. throws a fit for Areeba coming to the hospital, going to her house for meetings etc. Eventually, Khusbu secretly marries Akbar, at first he was quite strict but gradually he starts loving Khusbu a lot. You find out that even Areeba secretly signed the niqah with Kesar, in order to support her family. Areeba gets pregnant and Marina (kesar's first wife) is angry because she believes that she built this large business empire and he is giving it all away to some poor girl. Marina devices a plan with khavar, in which soha (Marina and Kesars daughter) will marry Juvad (Khavar's son) in order to make Kesar angry. juvad finds out that Soha has less business under her name compared to Areeba. Kesar has a stroke and is now forever bound in a wheel chair. Marina is persuaded by Khavar to put poison in Kesar's water jug.

Kesar is thirsty and asks Areeba to pour him some water. she walks towards the jug and picks it up and carries it towards him. in a separate scene you see, Soha over hearing the fact that Marina and Khavar poisoning Kesars water. she rushes to her father. but when she opens the door, she sees him drinking the water. she runs to him, and throws the cup on the floor. she reassures him that everything will be alright. she explains to them that Khaver poisoned his water. the poison takes its effects on Kesar, Areeba phones the ambulance and you see the Areeba and Soha outside the ICU.

Khavar, phones Juvad to give him the good news, of his plan being successful, but when he calls another man answers the call. he tells him that Juvad died from a car accident.

Areeba receives a call and tells Soha that Junaid died, she replies by saying that Khavar deserves this pain. Areeba's mom and Arsal arrive. A few minutes later, the surgeon comes out of the surgical room and says that he couldn't save Kesar. Soha cries and tells the doctor to save her father, the doctor leaves and Soha falls on the ground. Arsal comforts her. While, Areeba falls on the chair and faints.

Marina goes to Khavar and says that she has been contacting him for days, and that she is clueless what to do. she says that being quiet will make them both get arrested if they don't straighten up there story. she says that Kesar was her husband too, and if Khavar supports her then she can put a case on Areeba for poisoning Kesar, just for some property. Khavar says that he is a sinner and that he can't sin any more and that Javad's sins are all because of him

Areeba is in her room, shocked that she lost her husband. Arsal says that Areeba should handle herself, as Kesar had developed a big empire that is slowly breaking apart. for the last week the staff have been off and not working. Naheed supports Arsal and says that it's not only about looking after the property but to look after Soha too. soha remembers the times she spent with her father. Marina enter the room and says we shouldn't allow Areeba, the killer of Kesar walk around freely, because she is a criminal. but soha reveals that the only criminal in killing her father was her and that her father wasn't as bad as Marina portrayed. Marina says that Areeba brainwashed her. Marina sneakily goes into Areeba's room, Areeba is sleeping, Marina walks towards the drawers and sees the divorce document. she accidentally drops the medicine bottle. Areeba wakes up, and Marina asks her when Kesar signed the divorce papers and why she hide them. Soha enters the room. Areeba says that she told Kesar to give the documents after Soha's wedding, because she knows how hard it is for a girl not to have a father to protect her, is not a good life. Soha tells Areeba after all that she did to her, why she protected her and thought about her, and that she should throw her out of the house and hate her. Areeba says that the business, money, property is Soha and will always be hers. she just wants to let her know that what you see may not be true and that not everyone the police arrests are criminals. Soha asks Areeba for forgiveness. Marina get s arrested and you see Khavar is also arrested. Soha cries as her mom, enters the police van.

There is a time skip, Soha is in the grave yard with a little boy throwing petals on Kesar's grave. Areeba, Nabeel (can walk now and has a job) and Arsal arrives at the grave. The little boy is Areeba and Kesar's son. they all do dua and Arsal's phone starts to ring, he has to go to work and offers to drop them all home. the drama ends with them all walking out of the grave yard.

== Cast ==
- Jahanzeb Khan as Arsal
- Shamil Khan as Kesar
- Mariyam Nafees as Soha
- Komal Aziz Khan as Areeba ( kesar's 2nd wife)
- Kiran Tabeir as Khusbu
- Humaira Bano
- Tabbasum Arif as Zobia
- Fazal
- Aisha
- Junaid Awan
- Mizna Waqas
- Urooj Abbas
- Faheem Tijani
- Afshan Qureshi as Sarjjo
- Mahajabeen as Marina
- Uzma Beg
- Khalid Malik as akabar ( Khusbu's husband)
- Anwaar Sheikh

== Soundtrack ==
Ishq-e-Benaam

Soundtrack album by Harshdeep Kaur and Asad Riaz
- Released: 29 October 2015
- Recorded: November 2015
- Genre: Theme song, Television soundtrack
- Length: 1:27
- Producer: MD Productions; Samina Humayun; Tariq Shah

The Theme song of Ishq-e-Benaam is its original soundtrack, written by Adam Azeem, a writer. The music is a label of Momina Duraid Productions.
