= Qudsia Ali =

Pakistani actress

- Occupations: Actress; Model
- Years active: 2015 – present

Qudsia Ali (born 2 February 1997) is a Pakistani actress. She began her acting career in 2020 with ARY Digital's Aulaad and gained popularity after the drama. She has since appeared in a number of television serials, including Dil Awaiz, Mushkil, Betiyaan, and Kuch Ankahi.

In 2021, she made her film debut with Nabeel Qureshi's historical drama Khel Khel Mein. In 2022, she played the lead role in a short film titled "XXL", which was released on YouTube.

== Filmography ==
=== Film ===
Year	Title	Role	Notes
2021	Khel Khel Mein	Aisha	
2022	XXL	Mehak	Short film, lead role

=== Television ===
Year	Title	Role	Ref.
2020	Aulaad	Munni	
2022	Dil Awaiz	Maryam	
2022	Mushkil	Aneela	
2022	Betiyaan	Hania Laiq	
2023	Kuch Ankahi	Tania Agha	
2023	Sukoon	Aima	
2024	Siraab	TBA	
2025	Ek Jhooti Kahani		
