= Naqab Zan =

Pakistani drama series

- Written by: Rizwan Ahmed
- Directed by: Adeel Siddiqui
- Starring: Saboor Aly; Ali Abbas; Hajra Yamin; Waseem Abbas; Haris Waheed
- Country of origin: Pakistan
- Original language: Urdu
- No. of seasons: 1
- No. of episodes: 37

Production
- Producer: Momina Duraid
- Production location: Pakistan
- Camera setup: Multi-camera setup
- Running time: approx. 40 minutes
- Production company: MD Productions

Original release
- Network: Hum TV
- Release: 23 July – 24 December 2019

Naqab Zan (Urdu: نقب زن, lit. 'Burglar') is a 2019 Pakistani thriller drama television series produced by Momina Duraid under MD Productions. The 37-episode series has Ali Abbas, Saboor Aly and Hajra Yamin in pivotal roles.

== Cast ==
- Ali Abbas as Aamir; Jameel and Nafissa's son-in-law, Dua and Farhat's husband, Faria's brother-in-law (male antagonist)
- Saboor Aly as Dua; Jameel and Nafisa's daughter, Farhat and Faria's sister, Aamir's second ex-wife (female protagonist)
- Ali Ansari as Meerab; Dua's love interest, Ramsha’s brother and Jahan Ara’s son (male protagonist)
- Hajra Yamin as Farhat; Jameel and Nafisa's daughter, Dua and Faria's older sister, Aamir's first wife.
- Waseem Abbas as Jameel; Farhat Dua and Faria's father, Nafisa's husband, Aamir's father in law
- Amna Malik as Ramsha; Meerab's sister, daughter of Jahan Ara. Dua's therapist.
- Haris Waheed as Raheel; A servant in the house
- Ghazala Butt as Dua's aunt
- Tabbasum Arif as Tai Jan
- Farah Nadir as Raheel's mother
- Ayesha Khan as Dua's grandmother
- Sehar Khan as Faria; younger sister of Dua and Farhat
- Rashida Tabassum
- Ali Tariq
- Qamar Ul Islam
