= Wajahat Rauf =

Pakistani director and actor

Wajahat Rauff
- Born: 9 October 1976 (age 49); Karachi, Sindh, Pakistan
- Education: California State University, Fullerton
- Occupations: Director; Actor; Screenwriter; Comedian; Producer; Musician
- Known for: Karachi Se Lahore (2015); Voice Over Man
- Height: 5 ft 10 in (178 cm)
- Spouse: Shazia Wajahat
- Children: 2

Wajahat Rauf is a Pakistani director, actor, screenwriter, producer and musician.

He has directed and produced commercially successful films, including Karachi Se Lahore (2015), Lahore Se Aagey (2016), Chhalawa (2019), Parde Mein Rehne Do (2022) & Daghabaaz Dil (2024). Rauf has also produced several popular TV dramas including Raqs-e-Bismil (2021). He is the host and creator of a popular YouTube show Voice Over Man.

== Career ==
=== TV producer and musician ===
Wajahat Rauf was the channel head of AAG TV, a youth entertainment channel with particular focus on music, and he himself released a song in 2011, Shikwa. It became the OST for the youth series Kiya Life Hai, which aired on ARY Digital. He has produced over 26 television dramas.

=== Film career ===
Rauf made his debut as a film director with Karachi Se Lahore in 2015, which grossed Rs.10.5 crore at the box-office. He made his second film in 2016, which was titled Lahore Se Aagey, which grossed Rs. 21.6 crore at the box-office. In 2019, he directed Chhalawa, which was also a box-office success. His 4th film, Parde Mein Rehne Do was released on May 3, 2022, and received critical acclaim from major publications.

== Filmography ==
Key
†	Denotes film/series that have not yet been released

=== Television serials ===
Year	Title	Director	Producer	Screenwriter	Notes
2006	Karachi High	Yes	Yes	No	
2006	Minglish	Yes	Yes	No	
2011	Kya Life Hai	Yes	Yes	Yes	
2013	Ek Aur Ek Dhai	Yes	Yes	No	
2013	Shab-e-Aarzoo Ka Alam	No	Yes	No	
2013	Soteli	No	Yes	No	
2014	Jab We Wed	Yes	Yes	No	
2014	Main Kukkoo Aur Woh	No	Yes	No	Hum Award for Best Television Film
2014	Nikah	No	Yes	No	
2015	Naraaz	No	Yes	No	
2016	Mein Kaise Kahun	No	Yes	No	
2016	Meher Aur Meherban	No	Yes	No	
2017	Tumhare Hain	No	Yes	No	
2017	Yaar-e-Bewafa	No	Yes	No	
2017	Shadi Mubarak Ho	Yes	Yes	No	
2018	Qaid	No	Yes	No	
2019	Damsa	No	Yes	No	
2020	Raqs e Bismil	Yes	Yes	No	
2023	Daurr	Yes	Yes	No	
2023	Guru	No	Yes	No	
2023	Hadsa	Yes	Yes	No	
2024	Tubelite	Yes	Yes	Yes	Also a supporting role
2024	Kaisi Hai Ye Ruswai	Yes	Yes	No	
2025	Goonj	Yes	No	No	

=== Film ===
Year	Film	Director	Producer	Screenwriter	Actor	Notes
2015	Karachi Se Lahore	Yes	Yes	No	Yes	Debut as film director and cameo as a Sindhi landlord
2016	Lahore Se Aagey	Yes	Yes	No	No	
2019	Chhalawa	Yes	Yes	Yes	Yes	cameo as Voice Over Man in the train
2022	Parde Mein Rehne Do	Yes	Yes	No	TBA	
2022	Dum Mastam	No			Yes	cameo as Voice Over Man
2024	Daghabaaz Dil	Yes	No	Yes	No	

=== Web ===
Year	Title	Director	Producer	Screenwriter	Notes
2017–present	Voice Over Man	Yes	Yes	Yes	Talkshow; released on Showcase TV
2019	Enaaya	Yes	Yes	Yes	Webseries on Eros Now

== Discography ==
=== Singles ===
- Talaash (2018) ft. Aashir Wajahat, his son

== Awards and nominations ==
Year	Awards	Category	Work	Result	Ref.
2014	Hum Awards	Best Telefilm	Main Kukkoo Aur Woh	Won	
2015	ARY Film Awards	Best Film Director	Karachi Se Lahore	Nominated	
2017	Lux Style Awards	Best Director	Lahore Se Aagey	Nominated	
2021	Pakistan International Screen Awards	Best Director	Chhalawa	Nominated	
2021	Hum TV Awards	Best Director	Raqs-e-Bismil	Nominated	
2021	Pakistan International Screen Awards	Best Use of Humour in Social Media	Voice Over Man	Nominated	
2024	Nation's Leaders Awards	Director of the Year		Won	

=== Lux Style Awards ===
Ceremony	Category	Project	Result
16th Lux Style Awards	Best Film Director	Lahore Se Aagey	Nominated
21st Lux Style Awards	Best TV Director	Raqs-e-Bismil	Nominated
22nd Lux Style Awards	Best Film Director	Parde Mein Rehne Do	Nominated

== See also ==
- List of film directors
- List of Pakistani television directors
- List of Pakistani male actors
