= Bisaat e Dil =

2018 Pakistani television series

- Left to right: Nausheen Ahmed, Shehroz Sabzwari, Komal Aziz Khan
- Original title: ur
- Genre: Romantic drama; Serial drama; Teen drama
- Written by: Amna Riaz.
- Directed by: Ali Masud Saeed
- Starring: Komal Aziz Khan; Nausheen Ahmed; Shehroz Sabzwari; Imran Aslam; Beenish Raja; Tauqeer Nasir; Behroz Sabzwari; Haris Waheed
- Country of origin: Pakistan
- Original language: Urdu
- No. of seasons: 1
- No. of episodes: 36

Production
- Producer: Momina Duraid
- Production location: Pakistan
- Camera setup: Multi-camera setup
- Production company: MD Productions

Original release
- Network: Hum TV
- Release: 29 October 2018 – 26 February 2019

Bisaat-e-Dil (Urdu: بساط دل) is a 2018 Pakistani television series produced by Momina Duraid under their banner MD Productions. It is directed by Ali Masud Saeed and written by Amnah Riaz. It features Komal Aziz Khan, Nausheen Ahmed, and Shehroz Sabzwari.

== Plot summary ==
Bisaat e Dil is the journey of three characters – Ania, Sania and Shahnawaz – from bad to good circumstances. The serial depicts how different people react differently when unexpected and sometimes bad situations arise in life.

Shahnawaz is the son of a feudal landlord from Sindhi background whose father kicks him out of his house after being a victim of false allegations of harassment. On the other hand, Ania and Sania are two sisters, having completely different personalities from one another. Sania is ambitious and tries to do better for her family members as his father is a drug addict while Ania is a dreamy girl, who commends a mistake after falling for a boy that changes her life forever.

== Cast ==
- Komal Aziz Khan as Ania
- Nausheen Ahmed as Sania
- Shehroz Sabzwari as Shahnawaz
- Imran Aslam as Mazhar
- Beenish Raja as Gul Bano
- Tauqeer Nasir as Malik
- Behroz Sabzwari as Jehangir
- Haris Waheed as Hannan
- Seemi Pasha
- Alizeh Shah as Shafaq
- Syeda Palwasha Yahya Shah as Nishwa
- Shehzeen Rahat as Saman
- Uzma Beg as Haleema
- Faisal Naqvi
- Zainab Qayyum as Gushan Araa
- Munazzah Arif as Fatima
- Tahira Erum
- Abul Hasan
- Ayesha Khan as Sania's mother
- Muhammad Haris
- Usama Khan as Adil
- Hammad Siddiq
- Imran Hassan as Hadeed
- Mussarrat Parveen
- Rabia Kiran
- Rameez Alam Siddiqui
- Sajeeruddin Khalifa as Ilyas' brother
- Tanveer Hussain Malik

== Soundtrack ==
Soundtrack album by Sanwal Esakhelvi
- Released: 30 October 2018
- Recorded: 2018
- Genre: Television soundtrack
- Length: (2:22)
- Language: Urdu
- Label: Hum TV

Music video
- "Bisaat e Dil" OST on YouTube

The title song was sung by Sanwal Esakhelvi. The music was composed by Shuja Hyder and the lyrics were written by Sabir Zafar.
