= Noor Zafar Khan =

Pakistani actress

- Born: 8 August 1999 (age 27); Medina, Saudi Arabia
- Occupation: Actress
- Years active: 2015–present
- Relatives: Sarah Khan (sister)

Noor Zafar Khan (Urdu: نور ظفر خان) is a Pakistani actress who appears in Urdu-language television series. She is known for playing roles in the romance Bharam (2019) and the mystery drama Chalawa (2020).

== Early life ==
Khan was born to a Lebanese mother and a Pakistani Pashtun father of Yusufzai tribe. She was born in Medina and spent the early years of her life there, moving to Pakistan with her family at the age of 7. She was schooled in Karachi. She has two sisters, Sarah and Ayesha, and a brother named Hamza.

== Career ==
Khan started her career with modeling and appeared in several television commercials. She then played supporting roles in the political drama Preet Na Kariyo Koi (2015) and the religious drama Saya-e-Dewar Bhi Nahi (2016), before earning recognition with the romantic drama Gustakh Ishq (2017). In 2017, she appeared as Noor in Urdu1's short film Noor opposite Asim Azhar. She played the role of Zoya in Tau Dil Ka Kiya Hua (2017–2018) and made special appearance in Angeline Malik's anthology series Kabhi Band Kabhi Baja (2018).

== Television ==
Year	Title	Role	Notes
2015	Kaise Huaye Benaam	Maheen	
2016	Kitni Girhain Baaki Hain (season 2)	Romaisa	Episode 4
2015–2016	Preet Na Kariyo Koi	Noor-ul-Ain	
2016–2017	Saya-e-Dewar Bhi Nahi	Shafaq	
2017	Gustakh Ishq	Maliha	
2017	Noor	Noor	Telefilm
2017	Yeh Ishq Hai	Mariam	Episode "Tum Na Miltay To"
2017	Sabse Mushkil Shaadi	Maira	Telefilm
2017–2018	Tau Dil Ka Kia Hua	Zoya	
2017–2018	Khidmat Guzar	Dua	
2018-2019	Mohabbat Karna Mana Hai	Neelam	
2018	Ustani Jee	Zarina	Episode 13, 14
2018	Kabhi Band Kabhi Baja	Herself	Episode 3 and 21
2019	Bharam	Noor Mushtaq	
2020–2021	Chalawa	Sawera Ahmed	
2024	Pas-e-Deewar	Ujala	
