= Damsa =

2019 Pakistani crime drama television series

- Written by: Asma Nabeel
- Directed by: Najaf Bilgrami
- Theme music composer: AD Studio
- Composer: Syed Adeel Ali
- Country of origin: Pakistan
- Original language: Urdu
- No. of episodes: 27

Production
- Producers: Asmaira Dossani; Kashif Dossani; Wajahat Rauf; Shazia Wajahat
- Camera setup: Multi-camera setup
- Production company: Showcase Productions

Original release
- Network: ARY Digital
- Release: 29 November 2019 – 29 January 2020

Damsa is a 2019 Pakistani crime drama television series, produced by Asmaira Dossani, Kashif Dossani, Shazia Wajahat and Wajahat Rauf under their banner Showcase Productions and directed by Najaf Bilgrami. It stars Nadia Jamil, Emaan Khan, Shahood Alvi and Momal Sheikh in leading roles. The serial focuses on child trafficking.

== Cast ==
- Emaan Sheikh as Damsa
- Nadia Jamil as Areeja (Damsa's mother)
- Shahood Alvi as Musa (Damsa's father)
- Falak Naeem as Rahim (Damsa's brother)
- Gul-e-Rana as Rehana (Musa's mother)
- Ayesha Gul as Sofia (Musa's sister)
- Ismat Zaidi as Abru (Areeja's mother)
- Talat Hussain as Sohail (Restaurant owner)
- Momal Sheikh as Saman (Sohail's daughter)
- Saad Zameer Fareedi as Mazaari

Damsa - Nena - OST

Soundtrack album by: Jeem Se Jafer; Saman Sabri; Ayaz Sheikh
