= Furqan Qureshi =

Pakistani television actor

- فرقان قریشی
- Born: 4 January 1988 (age 38); Karachi, Pakistan
- Occupation: Actor
- Years active: 2008–present
- Spouse: Sabrina Naqvi (m. 2016)

Furqan Qureshi is a Pakistani television actor known for his roles in Urdu television serials such as Khuda Mera Bhi Hai, Ishq Tamasha, Meray Paas Tum Ho and Raqs-e-Bismil.

== Career ==
Qureshi made his television debut with a minor role in TV One's Shaista Shaista, written by Mohammad Ahmed. He first received recognition for his role of Agha in Youth series Dreamers, created and directed by Azfar Ali. He then played supporting characters in several television serials such as Goya, Zinda Dargor and Muqaddas.

Qureshi first played the lead role in Hum Sitaray's 100 Din Ki Kahani for which he also received his first nomination, Hum Awards for Best Actor Soap. He appeared in several serials of ARY Zindagi such as Inteqam, Badbakht and Khushaal Susral. He received critical praise by portraying an intersex in Sana Shahnawaz's Khuda Mera Bhi Hai. Furthermore, he recently appeared in television serials such as Ishq Tamasha, Meray Paas Tum Ho, and Raqs-e-Bismil.

== Filmography ==
=== Television drama ===
| Year | Title | Role | Network | Notes |
|---|---|---|---|---|
| 2008 | Shaista Shaista | Amir | TV One | |
| 2009 | Dreamers | Agha | AAG TV | |
| 2014 | Jab We Wed | Zero | Urdu 1 | |
| 2014 | Nazdikiyaan | | ARY Digital | |
| 2014 | Goya | Ali | ARY Digital | |
| 2015 | Dil-e-Barbaad | Adeel | ARY Digital | |
| 2015 | Zinda Dargor | | ARY Digital | |
| 2015 | Muqaddas | Kabeer | Hum TV | |
| 2016 | Khushaal Susral | Umer | ARY Zindagi | |
| 2016 | Tere Baghair | Haroon | Hum TV | |
| 2016 | Zindagi Tujh Ko Jiya | Zeeshan | Hum TV | |
| 2016 | Baray Dhoke Hain Iss Raah Mein | Ayaan | A-Plus TV | |
| 2016 | Khuda Mera Bhi Hai | Noor | ARY Digital | |
| 2017 | Mera Aangan | Armaan | ARY Digital | |
| 2017 | Rishtey Kachay Dhagon Se | | A-Plus TV | |
| 2017 | Gali Mein Chaand Nikla | Sikander | TV One | |
| 2017 | Adhoora Bandhan | Shahmeer | Geo Entertainment | |
| 2018 | Woh Mera Dil Tha | Arham | ARY Digital | |
| 2018 | Badbakht | Khuram | ARY Zindagi | |
| 2018 | Ishq Tamasha | Wahaj | Hum TV | |
| 2019 | Meray Paas Tum Ho | Salman | ARY Digital | |
| 2019–2020 | Daasi | Adil | Hum TV | |
| 2019–2020 | Log Kya Kahenge | Haroon | ARY Digital | |
| 2020–2021 | Bharaas | Kamal | ARY Digital | |
| 2020–2021 | Aulaad | Adnan | ARY Digital | |
| 2020–2021 | Raqs-e-Bismil | Malik Shehryar | Hum TV | |
| 2021 | Oye Motti | Nomaan | Express Entertainment | Episode 9 only |
| 2021 | Azmaish | Rohaan | ARY Digital | |
| 2021 | Banno | Azlan | Geo Entertainment | |
| 2022 | Hum 2 Hamaray 100 | Arsalan | Aan TV | |
| 2023 | Gumn | Shahid | Green Entertainment | |
| 2024 | Aye Ishq e Junoon | Jamal Ahmed | ARY Digital | |
| 2025 | Inteha | Naveed | ARY Digital | |

=== Telefilms ===
| Year | Title | Notes |
|---|---|---|
| 2017 | Sab Se Mushkil Shadi | |
| 2017 | Kambakht Dil | |
| 2018 | Hum Chale Aaye | |

=== Web series ===
| Year | Title | Role | Notes |
|---|---|---|---|
| 2021 | Ek Jhoothi Love Story | Salahuddin | |
