= Ayesha Khan (Pakistani actress) =

Pakistani actress (1941–2025)

Ayesha Riyasat Khan
- عائشہ خان
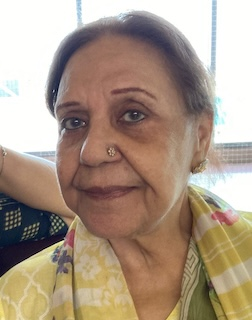
- Khan in her later years
- Born: Ayesha Riyasat Ullah Khan; 3 January 1941; Shajahanpur, Uttar Pradesh, British India
- Died: June 2025 (aged 84); Karachi, Sindh, Pakistan
- Education: University of Karachi
- Occupations: Actress; radio artist
- Years active: 1949–2025
- Children: 3
- Relatives: Khalida Riyasat (sister)

Ayesha Khan (Urdu: عائشہ خان; 3 January 1941 – June 2025) was a veteran Pakistani actress. She was known for her drama roles in PTV's Afshan, Aroosa, and Family 93. In later years, she worked in a number of dramas and films which include Mehndi, Safar Ba-khair, Naqab Zan, Bharosa Pyar Tera, and Bisaat e Dil.

== Early life ==
Ayesha was born on 3 January 1941, and was the elder sister of actress Khalida Riyasat. Her father, Riyasatullah Khan, was a former superintendent of the Karachi police force in the 1960s. She graduated from the University of Karachi.

== Career ==
Ayesha started working at Radio Pakistan, then appeared in Pakistan Television (PTV) dramas in 1964 when PTV was a newly established national channel. She was popular in portraying satirical comic roles as well as serious, complex and grey-shaded roles. She worked with prominent actors Talat Hussain, Mahmood Ali , Mansoor Qureshi, and Qazi Wajid.

She was often paired onscreen with Qazi Wajid as their chemistry and camaraderie were liked on-screen. She was even part of his documentary aired on PTV titled Main Hoon Qazi Wajid.

She also worked in theatre plays with Saba Hameed and Samina Ahmed.

== Personal life ==
Ayesha had three children: a daughter named Aliya Bibi, a popular model in 1990s, and two sons.

One of her show Aanch which aired on PTV got a special tribute show called The Aanch Show to celebrate the success of it hosted by Moin Akhtar where audiences saw her live appearance. Which was rarest of rare as she hardly gave interviews and public appearances.

== Death ==
Khan's body was found in her Karachi apartment in Gulshan-e-Iqbal on 19 June 2025. She had died several days earlier. She was 84.

== Filmography ==
=== Television series ===
Year	Title	Role	Network
1981	Afshan	Husna	PTV
1985	Anhoni	Ashi's mother	PTV
1985	Akhri Chattan	Begum Wazir-e-Azam	PTV
1986	Altamash	Qutub Begum	PTV
1987	Gardish	Saliha	PTV
1988	Sirriyan	Rasheeda	PTV
1992	Aanch	Ulfat's mother	PTV
1993	Agar	Parveen Begum	PTV
1993	Badaltey Mausam	Yasmeen's mother	PTV
1994	Aroosa	Shireen	PTV
1994	Yeh Jahan	Erum's mother	PTV
1994	Mad Cow	Aunty Mashkoora	PTV
1994	Aitraf	Zakia	PTV
1995	Daraarein	Sadia's mother	PTV
1996	Mahpara	Mahpara's mother	PTV
1996	The Aanch Show	Herself	PTV
1996	Eaitraf	Zakia	PTV
1997	Family 93	Zohra	PTV
1997	Tipu Sultan: The Tiger Lord	Malka Begum Nizam	PTV
1997	Panchwan Mausam	Asim's mother	PTV
1998	Aik Qadam Par Manzil	Suriya	PTV
1998	Hayat-e-Javed	Savitri	PTV
1998	Bandhan	Dil Awaiz's mother	PTV
1999	Shaam Sey Phelay	Zaib-un-Nisa	PTV
1999	Saibaan	Zaheer's mother	PTV
1999	Lamhey	Shiza	PTV
2000	Kabhi Kabhi Pyar Mein	Zoya's mother	PTV
2000	Ek Aur Aasman	Maria	PTV
2002	Lamha	Meher's mother	PTV
2003	Hum Se Juda Na Hona	Chanda	PTV
2003	Sahil Ki Tamana	Khala Jan	PTV
2003	Mehndi	Taseem	PTV
2005	Wajood-E-Lariab	Aliya Begum	Indus TV
2005	Husna Aur Husan Ara	Bua	TV One
2008	Shiddat	Batool Begum	Hum TV
2009	Bol Meri Machli	Asma	Geo TV
2009	Nadaaniyaan	Nida's mother	Geo Entertainment
2010	Parsa	Shabana	Hum TV
2010	Zindaan	Mother	PTV
2011	Zip Bus Chup Raho	Adan	Geo TV
2012	Be Aemaan	Bi Jaan	PTV
2012	Dehleez	Amma	ARY Digital
2012	Maseeba	Maira	Hum TV
2012	Mirat-ul-Uroos	Akbari	Geo Entertainment
2014	Qudrat	Ami Jaan	ARY Digital
2015	Bojh	Ahsan mother	Geo TV
2015	Dil Ishq	Ama Jaan	Geo Entertainment
2015	Tumhare Siwa	Arsal mother	Hum TV
2016	Mera Yaar Miladay	Fahad mother	ARY Digital
2016	Noor-e-Zindagi	Noor's mother	Geo TV
2016	Khuda Mera Bhi Hai	Ami	ARY Digital
2017	Woh Aik Pal	Hina's grandmother	Hum TV
2017	Mubarak Ho Beti Hui Hai	Dadu	ARY Digital
2017	Teri Raza	Suhana's grandmother	ARY Digital
2018	Meri Nanhi Pari	Sehr's mother	ARY Digital
2018	Meri Guriya	Sharifan	ARY Digital
2018	Maryam Periera	Bilal's mother	TV One
2019	Bisaat e Dil	Sania's mother	Hum TV
2019	Naqab Zan	Dua's grandmother	Hum TV
2019	Bharosa Pyar Tera	Raeesa Khanum	Geo Entertainment
2019	Kaise Ye Paheli	Almas Jehangir	Urdu 1
2020	Soteli Maamta	Fareen's Mother-in-law	Hum TV

=== Telefilm ===
Year	Title	Role
2004	Eid Aayi	Sajjo/ Sajeela
2025	Qurbani Ka Bakra: Ghar Damad	Qazi Wajid 's Wife
2012	Teeja Party	Aapa
2014	Who Bahu	Amma
2017	Safar Bakhair	Wife of Qazi Wajid
2019	Ye Ishq Nahi Aasan	Sameer's grandmother

=== Film ===
Year	Title	Role
1970	Parai Beti	Zakia
1970	Chand Suraj	Mona
1986	BeQarar	Emi
1992	Aaj Ka Dour	Beena
1994	Sab Kay Baap	Maira
1996	Raju Ban Geya Gentleman	Tahira
2011	Muskaan	Nafeesa Hashmi Khan
2012	Fatima	Fatima
