= List of ARY Film Awards ceremonies =

This is a list of ARY Film Awards ceremonies. This list is current as of the 1st ARY Film Awards ceremony held on 25 May 2014.

== Venues ==
- 2014: Golf Club, DHA Phase VIII, Karachi, Sindh, Pakistan.

== Networks ==
- 2014: ARY Digital Network or ARY Digital

== Ceremonies ==
All award times local (PST/UTC+5).

Ceremony	Date	Time	Best Film Jury Winner	Best Film Viewers Winner	Length of ceremony	Number of viewers and Ratings	Host(s)	Co-Host(s)	Venue
1st ARY Film Awards	25 May 2014	6:30 p.m.(Red carpet); 8:00 p.m.	Zinda Bhaag	Waar	3 hours, 45 minutes	15 Million; 7.7%	Shaan Shahid; Ayesha Omer	Fahad Mustafa; Sarwat Gilani; Hamza Ali Abbasi	Golf Club, DHA Phase VIII, Karachi
Ceremony was not held to honored 2014 films.
2nd ARY Film Awards	18 February 2016	TBA							Dubai, UAE
3rd ARY Film Awards									
4th ARY Film Awards									

== Film awards by ceremony ==
=== ARY Film Awards 2014 ===
==== Viewers' choice ====
- Best actor: Shaan Shahid (in Waar)
- Best actor in comic role: Ismail Tara (in Main Hoon Shahid Afridi)
- Best actor in negative role: Shamoon Abbasi (in Waar)
- Best actress: Ayesha Khan (in Waar)
- Best director: Bilal Lashari for Waar
- Best female playback singer: Abida Parveen (in Ishq Khuda)
- Best film: Waar (produced by Hassan Rana)
- Best independent film: Josh: Independence Through Unity (directed by Iram Parveen Bilal, produced by Saad Bin Mujeeb and Kelly Thomas)
- Best male playback singer: Rahat Fateh Ali Khan (in Zinda Bhaag)
- Best original music: Main Hoon Shahid Afridi (sung by Shani and Kami)
- Best star debut female: Ayesha Khan (in Waar)
- Best star debut male: Hamza Ali Abbasi (in Main Hoon Shahid Afridi)
- Best supporting actor: Hamza Ali Abbasi (in Waar)
- Best supporting actress: Meesha Shafi (in Waar)

==== Technical award ====
- Best action: Waar
- Best background score: Zinda Bhaag
- Best cinematography: Waar
- Best dialogue: Main Hoon Shahid Afridi
- Best screenplay: Siyaah..
- Best story: Zinda Bhaag

==== Honorary Award ====
- International icon: Ali Zafar
- Lifetime achievement award: Nadeem Baig
- Special contribution to Pakistani cinema: Shaan Shahid

=== ARY Film Awards 2016 ===
==== Jury choice ====
- Best actor: Sarmad Sultan Khoosat (in Manto)
- Best actress: Samiya Mumtaz (in Moor)
- Best director: Nadeem Beyg (in Jawani Phir Nahi Ani)
- Best film: Jawani Phir Nahi Ani

=== ARY Film Awards 2017 ===
- Best short: In Search of America, Inshallah (directed by Danish Renzu)

=== ARY Film Awards 2020 ===
- Best actor: Ahmad Ali Butt
- Best actress: Ramsha Khan (in Ghissi Pitti Mohabbat tv-show)

== See also ==
- Hum Awards
