= Mazhar Zaidi =

British Pakistani film producer, artist, journalist, columnist and documentary director

- Born: Lahore, Pakistan
- Education: MS in Journalism
- Occupation(s): filmmaker, animation, artist, Communications Specialist, Digital content, Producer, director, columnist and journalist
- Years active: 1992–present
- Notable work: Zinda Bhaag Jeewan Hathi Gardaab
- Spouse: Meenu Gaur

Mazhar Zaidi (Urdu: مظہر زیدی) is a British-Pakistani film producer, artist, journalist, columnist and documentary director. He has produced several issue-based documentaries and campaigns. He has developed, managed and delivered large international projects on CVE and produced digital campaigns on rights based issues for leading international non-governmental organisations including UKAid, IRC, CWS, creative Associates and Asia Foundation. He is best known for producing the 2013 Pakistani film Zinda Bhaag, which earned him international recognition and accolades and became the country's first entry to Academy Awards after a gap of over 50 years. The film also won many international awards. One of his films Gardaab which was set in extremist violence prone neighbourhoods of Karachi, screened at London Indian Film Festival in June 2017 and Jeewan Hathi was screened at Locarno Film Festival in Switzerland in August 2017. He along with his partners Meenu Gaur and Farjad Nabi also recently curated an art exhibition titled Art SabKa focussing on contemporary art inspired by Pakistani Cinema.

== Career ==
=== As a journalist, filmmaker and documentary maker ===
Before starting to make feature films, Zaidi was a well known journalist and producer at BBC Urdu UK. Zaidi has been working as a filmmaker/journalist for over 25 years. He served as a senior producer at BBC World in London for over 11 years and produced and directed many documentaries and programs for leading international TV networks including BBC, German TV channel, ARD, ZDF, Sky News and other independent media houses.

In 2006, he launched a project with BBC Urdu online and a group of community based filmmakers working with the NGO Interactive Resource Center (IRC) in Pakistan. The successful project produced more than 16 short documentaries, shot and directed by young filmmakers from small towns across Pakistan.

As a filmmaker and independent documentary maker Zaidi has been involved in a number of documentary projects that screened at international film festivals awhile his projects were broadcast by international channels including, BBC Four, ARD and ZDF.

His documentary Nar Narman about an Urdu language Pakistani gay-poet, gave him critical acclaim when it was screened at London's BFI L&G Film Festival in 2007.

== As a film producer ==
Zaidi started his career by producing a number of documentaries and videos, at different channels and platforms. But established himself as a recognised producer after producing 2013 Pakistani film Zinda Bhaag, Under his own film production Matteela Films which earned him a critical acclaimed and recognition in film world. Zinda Bhaag became one of the highest-grossing of Pakistan and has won many accolades and recognition including an official selection for Best Foreign Language Film at 86th Academy Awards however was out of the competition for the final race. Zinda Bhaag was only the third Pakistani film in 50 years to get recognition at the Oscars, after 1959's The Day Shall Dawn and 1963's The Veil.

== Work and filmography ==
=== As a producer ===
Year	Film	Language	Notes
2000	Yeh Hui Na Mardon Wali Baat	Urdu	Short-Film (Director)
2013	Zinda Bhaag	Punjabi	Matteela Films (producer) won: ARY Film Award for Best Film Jury; Nom: ARY Film Award for Best Film Viewers
2016	Gardaab	Urdu	Matteela Films (Producer)
2016	Jeewan Hathi	Urdu	Zee Essel Group (Pakistan Producer)
2016	Rahm	Urdu	Matteela Films (Line Producer)

=== As a documentary maker ===
Year	Film	Language	Notes
2006	Na Namar	English	Docudrama about a London-based Urdu-language gay poet.

=== As a journalist ===
Year	Statue	Platform	Role
1991–1994	Feature writer and reporter	The News	Responsible for writing daily reports and weekly features for the Islamabad-based newspaper.
1994–1995	Punjab Correspondent	Newsline	Covering and investigating political and social affairs from the largest province of Punjab for the Karachi-based monthly magazine.
1995–1997	Senior Reporter	The News on Sunday	Researching, investigating and writing weekly lead Special Reports and features for the weekly from Lahore covering political and social issues.
1997–2008	Producer	BBC Urdu Radio Online	Served as a broadcaster / producer / Desk Editor /Video Producer with BBC Urdu, launched video offer online from London and produced a number of programs and documentaries.
2008–2010	Editor Current Affairs	Dawn News	Served at the current affairs department at Pakistan's premier English language TV channel Dawn news. Responsible for managing the team and supervising production of daily and weekly content for TV and commissioning documentaries.
2010–2011	Series Editor	BBC Urdu TV Project	Developed concepts and produced current affairs programs and liaising with local partner TV channels and managing the production team.
2002–present	chief executive officer	Matteela Films Pvt Ltd	Produced, directed feature and documentaries films. Zinda Bhaag was producers under the banner of Matteela Films.

=== Miscellaneous ===
Zaidi also worked independently contributing a chapter to West and the Muslim World a publication by Transnational Institute, Germany also he exhibited as a Communication Consultant in non-governmental sector and served as a director, short video documentary for the British Council where his work was developing, conceptualising and producing a short video for the International Inspiration, London 2012's international sports legacy program.

== Awards ==
Date of ceremony	Award	Category	Recipient(s)	Result
25 May 2014	ARY Film Awards	Best Film Jury	Mazhar Zaidi	Won
25 May 2014	ARY Film Awards	Best Actress Jury	Amna Ilyas	Won
25 May 2014	ARY Film Awards	Best Film Viewers	Mazhar Zaidi	Nominated
25 May 2014	ARY Film Awards	Best Director	Meenu Gaur and Farjad Nabi	Nominated
25 May 2014	ARY Film Awards	Best Actor	Khurram Patras	Nominated
25 May 2014	ARY Film Awards	Best Actress	Amna Ilyas	Nominated
25 May 2014	ARY Film Awards	Best Supporting Actor	Gohar Rasheed and Salman Ahmad	Nominated
25 May 2014	ARY Film Awards	Best Supporting Actress	Naghma	Nominated
25 May 2014	ARY Film Awards	Best Star Debut Male	Khurram Patras	Nominated
25 May 2014	ARY Film Awards	Best Star Debut Female	Amna Ilyas	Nominated
25 May 2014	ARY Film Awards	Best Actor in a Comic Role	Zohaib Asghar	Nominated
25 May 2014	ARY Film Awards	Best Actor in a Negative Role	Nasiruddin Shah	Nominated
25 May 2014	ARY Film Awards	Best Original Music	Sahir Ali Bagga	Nominated
25 May 2014	ARY Film Awards	Best Male Playback Singer	Rahat Fateh Ali Khan	Nominated
25 May 2014	ARY Film Awards	Best Male Playback Singer	Abrar-ul-Haq	Nominated
25 May 2014	ARY Film Awards	Best Female Playback Singer	Iqra Ali	Nominated
25 May 2014	ARY Film Awards	Best Story	Meenu Gaur and Farjad Nabi	Won
25 May 2014	ARY Film Awards	Best Background Score	Sahir Ali Bagga	Won
14–16 August 2013	8th Annual Mosaic International South Asian Film Festival	Best Film	Mazhar Zaidi	Won
14–16 August 2013	8th Annual Mosaic International South Asian Film Festival	Best Actor	Khurram Patras	Won
14–16 August 2013	8th Annual Mosaic International South Asian Film Festival	Best Music	Sahir Ali Bagga	Won
