= 1st ARY Film Awards =

2014 Pakistani film awards ceremony

- Official poster
- Date: 27 April 2014; 24 May 2014 (televised)
- Site: Golf Club, DHA Phase VIII, Karachi, Sindh, Pakistan
- Hosted by: Shaan Shahid; Ayesha Omer (co-host); Fahad Mustafa (co-host); Sarwat Gilani (co-host); Hamza Ali Abbasi (co-host)
- Preshow hosts: Mawra Hocane
- Produced by: Salman Iqbal
- Directed by: Jarjees Seja

Highlights
- Best Film: Jury's choice: Zinda Bhaag
- Best Film: Viewers' choice: Waar
- Most awards: Waar (13)
- Most nominations: Zinda Bhaag and Main Hoon Shahid Afridi (19)

Television coverage
- Channel: ARY Digital
- Network: ARY Digital Network
- Duration: 3 hours, 45 minutes
- Ratings: 15 million 7.7%

The 1st ARY Film Awards or AFA'14 ceremony, presented by ARY Digital Network and Entertainment Channel, sponsored by Nokia, powered by ZONG and L'Oréal and took place on 27 April 2014 at the Golf Club, DHA Phase VIII, Karachi. The ceremony was held recorded and televised on 24 May 2014. During the ceremony ARY Digital Network and Entertainment Channel presented ARY Film Awards (commonly referred to as AFA's) in 29 categories and 4 special awards honoring the actors, technical achievements and films of 2013. The ceremony, televised in Pakistan by ARY Digital and was produced by ARY Digital Network chairman Salman Iqbal. ARY Film Awards became the most expensive event held in Pakistan.

Actor Shaan Shahid hosted the ceremony, while different segments were co-hosted by Ayesha Omer, Fahad Mustafa, Sarwat Gilani and Hamza Ali Abbasi. During the ceremony ARY presented its honorary lifetime achievement award and special honorary recognition to media and entertainment personalities.

Waar won the most awards with thirteen including Best Director - Viewers, Best Director - Jury and Best Film - Viewers. Other winners include Main Hoon Shahid Afridi with seven, Zinda Bhaag with five awards including Best Film - Jury and Josh, Chambaili, Ishq Khuda, Siyaah with one. The telecast garnered more than 15 million viewers in Pakistan.

== Winner and nominees ==
The nominees of 1st ARY Film Awards were announced on 9 April 2014 in Viewers Choice Categories for public voting's till 24 April 2014 at official website, While rest of the categories were announced on 25 April 2014. Main Hoon Shahid Afridi and Zinda Bhaag tied for the most nominations with nineteen each.

Winners were announced during the awards ceremony on 27 April 2014, televised on 24 May 2014. Only three films won multiple awards with Waar became the highest awarded film of the night with thirteen trophies out of it sixteen nominations, Main Hoon Shahid Afridi with seven including Best Actor Jury for Humayun Saeed and Best Star Debut Male for Hamza Ali Abbasi. Zinda Bhaag was the third and last multiple winner film with five trophies including Best Actress Jury for Amna Ilyas and Best Film Jury for Mazhar Zaidi. Hamza Ali Abbasi and Aeysha Khan became the first AFAs acting winner to win for a debut film. Waar became the first film to win both leading Male and Female acting awards in addition with Both Jury Choice and Viewers Choice in directing. All the Film and Acting nominations were the highlights of awards. Bilal Lashari and Hassan Waqas Rana were the highest awarded individuals with four and three trophies respectively, while Shaan, Hamza, Ayesha and Humayun with two trophies each.

=== Awards ===
Winners are listed first and indicated with a double-dagger ‡.

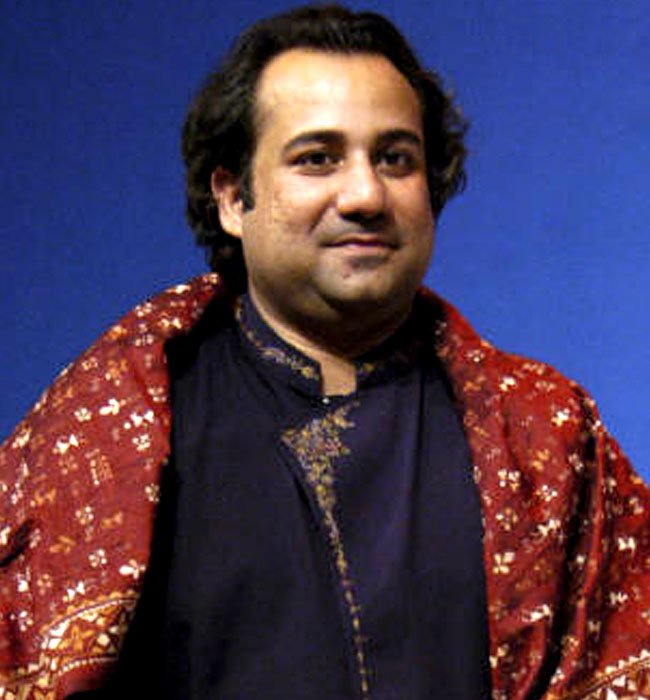
Rahat Fateh Ali Khan received the Best Male Playback Singer Award for Zinda Bhaag.

Jury Choice Categories
Best Film Jury	Best Director Jury
Zinda Bhaag – Mazhar Zaidi ‡	Bilal Lashari –Waar ‡
Best Actor Jury	Best Actress Jury
Humayun Saeed –Main Hoon Shahid Afridi ‡	Amna Ilyas –Zinda Bhaag ‡
Viewers Choice Categories
Best Film	Best Director
Waar – Hassan Waqas Rana ‡; Chambaili – Abdullah Kadwani and Shahzad Nawaz; Ishq Khuda – Shafqat Chaudhry; Main Hoon Shahid Afridi – Humayun Saeed and Shazad Nasib.; Zinda Bhaag – Mazhar Zaidi	Bilal Lashari – Waar ‡; Ismail Jilani – Chambaili; Shahzad Rafique –Ishq Khuda; Syed Ali Raza Usama – Main Hoon Shahid Afridi; Azfar Jafri – Siyaah; Meenu Gaur and Farjad Nabi – Zinda Bhaag
Best Actor	Best Actress
Shaan Shahid – Waar ‡; Humayun Saeed – Main Hoon Shahid Afridi; Mohib Mirza – Lamha; Ahsan Khan – Ishq Khuda; Khurram Patras – Zinda Bhaag; Adnan Shah Tipu – Josh	Ayesha Khan – Waar ‡; Mahnoor Baloch – Main Hoon Shahid Afridi; Aamina Sheikh – Lamha; Amna Ilyas – Zinda Bhaag; Hareem Farooq – Siyaah
Best Supporting Actor	Best Supporting Actress
Hamza Ali Abbasi – Waar; Noman Habib – Main Hoon Shahid Afridi ‡; Mohammed Ehteshamuddin – Chambaili; Gohar Rasheed – Lamha; Salman Ahmad – Zinda Bhaag	Misha Shafi – Waar ‡; Ainy Jaffri – Main Hoon Shahid Afridi; Nyla Jafri – Josh; Naghma Beghum – Zinda Bhaag; Mahnoor Usman – Siyaah
Best Star Debut Male	Best Star Debut Female
Hamza Ali Abbasi – Main Hoon Shahid Afridi ‡; Ali Azmat – Waar; Mohammed Ehteshamuddin – Chambaili; Khurram Patras – Zinda Bhaag; Noman Habib – Main Hoon Shahid Afridi	Ayesha Khan – Waar ‡; Ainy Jaffri – Main Hoon Shahid Afridi; Aamina Sheikh – Lamha; Amna Ilyas – Zinda Bhaag; Maira Khan – Chambaili
Best Actor in a Comic Role	Best Actor in a Negative Role
Ismail Tara – Main Hoon Shahid Afridi ‡; Zohaib Asghar – Zinda Bhaag	Shamoon Abbasi – Waar ‡; Javed Sheikh – Main Hoon Shahid Afridi; Shafqat Cheema – Chambaili; Naseeruddin Shah – Zinda Bhaag; Mahnoor Usman – Siyaah
Best Independent Film	Best Original Music
Lamha – Meher Jaffri, Summer Nicks and Craig Peter Jones; Siyaah – Imran Raza Kazmi	Shani and Kami – Main Hoon Shahid Afridi ‡; Sahir Ali Bagga – Zinda Bhaag; Najam Sheraz – Chambaili; Amir Munawar – Waar; Wajahat Attre – Ishq Khuda
Best Male Playback Singer	Best Female Playback Singer
Rahat Fateh Ali Khan – "Pata Yaar Da" from Zinda Bhaag ‡; Abrar-ul-Haq – "Pani Da Bulbula" from Zinda Bhaag; Umair Jaswal – "Khayal" from Waar; Shafqat Amanat Ali – "Jera Vi Hai Aanday" from Main Hoon Shahid Afridi; Rahat Fateh Ali Khan – "Malal" from Main Hoon Shahid Afridi	Abida Parveen – "Ishq Khuda" from Ishq Khuda ‡; Sanam Marvi – "Sauf Supari wala paan" from Ishq Khuda; Zoe Viccaji – "Jab Koi" from Lamha; Iqra Ali – "Kuri Yes A" from Zinda Bhaag; Neeti Wagh – "Masti Mein Doobi" from Main Hoon Shahid Afridi
Technical Awards
Best Story	Best Screenplay
Zinda Bhaag – Meenu Gaur and Farjad Nabi ‡	Siyaah – Osman Khalid Butt ‡
Best Dialogue	Best Action
Main Hoon Shahid Afridi – Vasay Chaudhry ‡	Waar – Hassan Waqas Rana ‡
Best Background Score	Best Cinematography
Zinda Bhaag – Sahir Ali Bagga ‡	Waar – Bilal Lashari ‡
Best Makeup and Hairstyling	Best Costume Design
Main Hoon Shahid Afridi – Nabila ‡	Chambaili – Sarah Gandapur ‡
Best Special Effects	Best Editing
Waar – Hassan Waqas Rana ‡	Waar – Bilal Lashari ‡
Best Choreography	
Main Hoon Shahid Afridi – Pappu Samrat ‡	

=== Honorary ARY Film Awards ===
The ARY Group presented Special Awards during the ceremony, that usually are not a part of specific category, but, a special honor for artists related to cinema.

Lifetime Achievement Award

- Nadeem Baig

International Icon of the Year

- Ali Zafar

Special Contribution to Pakistani Cinema

- Shaan Shahid

Special Contributing to film industry via theaters

- Asif Razaq – Capri Cinema
- Jamil Baig – Nueplex Cinemas
- Nadeem H. Mandviwalla - Atrium Cinemas
- Hashim Raza – Cinepax
- Hammad Chaudhry – Cinestar

=== Films with multiple nominations and awards ===
Films with multiple nominations
Nominations	Film
19	Main Hoon Shahid Afridi
19	Zinda Bhaag
16	Waar
8	Chambaili
6	Ishq Khuda
6	Siyaah
6	Lamha
3	Josh

Films with multiple awards
Awards	Film
13	Waar
7	Main Hoon Shahid Afridi
5	Zinda Bhaag

== Presenters and performers ==
The following individuals and groups, listed in order of appearance, presented awards or performed musical numbers.

=== Presenters ===
Name(s)	Role
Mustafa Qureshi; Sangeeta	Presenters of the awards for Best Editing, Best Special Effects and Best Cinematography
Waqar Ali Khan; Sabeena Pasha	Presenters of the awards for Best Action, Best Background Score and Best Choreography
Anwar Maqsood; Sanam Baloch	Presenters of the awards for Best Dialogue, Best Screenplay and Best Story
Tapu Javeri; Maheen Khan	Presenters of the awards for Best Costume Design and Best Makeup
Junaid Murtaza; Mawra Hocane	Presenters of the awards for Best Actor Jury
Sajjad Laghari; Cybil Chaudhry	Presenters of the award for Best Actress Jury
Ayesha Khan; Arif Raffique	Presenters of the award for Best Director Jury
Burhanuddin Qureshi; Urwa Tul Wusqa	Presenters of the award for Best Film Jury
Jerjees Seja; Aamina Sheikh	Presenters of the award for International Icon
Ejaz Aslam; Noor Bukhari	Presenter of Best Independent Film
Imran Momina; Meesha Shafi	Presenter of the award for Best Female Playback Singer
Nida Yasir	Presenter of the award for Best Male Playback Singer
Mehboob Abd-ul-Rauf	Presenter of the award for Honorary Token for Special Contribution through Cinema
Salman Iqbal	Presenter of the award of Lifetime Achievement Award and Honorary Award for Contribution to Cinema
Adnan Siddiqui; Sanam Saeed	Presenters of the award for Best Supporting Actress
Nomi Ansari; Sana Bucha	Presenters of the award of Best Supporting Actor
Asad ul Haq; Zeba Bakhtiar	Presenters of the award for Best Actor in a Negative Role
Hassan Sheheryar Yasin; Sabeeka	Presenters of the award for of Best Star Debut Female
Vasay Chaudhry; Bushra Ansari	Presenters of the award for of Best Star Debut Male
Hina Dilpazeer	Presenter of the awards for Best Actor in a Comic Role
Sakina Samo; Mohib Mirza	Presenters of the award for Best Music
Syed Noor; Haji Jaan Muhammad	Presenters of the award for Best Director
Asim Raza; Mahira Khan	Presenter of the award for Best Film
Humayun Saeed	Presenter of the award for Best Actress
Javed Sheikh; Babra Sharif	Presenters of the award for Best Actor

=== Performers ===
Name(s)	Role	Performed
Shehzad and it Group	LED Act	Professional LED dress wearing dancers to open the ceremony.
Amna Ilyas; Khurrum Patras	Performer	on a musical numbers of their nominated film Zinda Bhaag.
Ahsan Khan; Urwa Tul Wusqa; Ushna Shah	Performers	on a musical numbers of singer Sajjad Ali in order to pay tribute to his contributions.
Mariyum Ali Hussain	Performers	classical dance on a musical number of her upcoming film Mah-e-Meer.
Fahad Mustafa; Hina Dilpazeer	Comic act	comedy act by Hina in her fame-character Momo, supported by Fahad.
Mathira; Noman Habib; Gohar Rasheed; Humayun Saeed	Performer	on a musical numbers of their nominated film Main Hoon Shahid Afridi.
Sohai Ali Abro; Shehryar Munawar Siddiqui; Hamza Ali Abbasi	Performer	on a musical number of their upcoming film Kambakht.
Noor Bukhari; Saima Noor	Performer	on several Punjabi musical hits numbers of 90s and 10s.
Babra Sharif	Performer	on musical hits of her own films of 80s and 90s.

== Ceremony information ==
ARY Film Awards marked the inception of celebration of New Pakistani cinema by recognizing industry artist and technicians, ARY Films and ARY Group chairman Salman Iqbaal and CEO Jerjees Seja announced the Film Awards in early 2014, looking at the super-hit 2013 cinematic year and collaboration of ARY Films with other productions. Award ceremony was produced by Salman Iqbal with the cost of Rs 80 million, which made this event one of the most expensive ceremonies ever held.

Producer Slaman Iqbal and Jerjees Seja, centered the show around the theme. They asperse the show with a theme of celebrating the New Face of Pakistani Cinema commenting "Another milestone is going to be achieved by the Pakistan’s film industry with ARY Film Awards. It is a matter of pride for us that we are creating another platform to appreciate the talent of Pakistan and motivate the young and creative to make more films next year and keep the ball rolling". To coincide with the themes ARY Digital Network and Entertainment Channel presented a foray of special arrival by exhibiting dozens of sixty's hits movie banners, photographs, and artifacts.

Several other people were involved with the telecast and its promotion including show main sponsor Nokia's managing director Burhandun Qurreshi, while ZONG and L'Oréal served as a secondary sponsors. ARY team and crew designed 200-high feet stage in an open air at Golf club, while ARY Group spend Rs 80 million for the event. Winners with the ARY Trophy were awarded with Nokia mobile set. Television personality and actress Mawra Hocane hosted the Red carpet of ceremony.

=== Broadcasting ===
1st ARY Film Awards were broadcast by ceremony presenter ARY Digital Network and Entertainment Channel's ARY Digital. Ceremony was held live on 27 April while airs on 24 May after completion of editing and censorship process of Pakistan.

=== Voting trend and summary ===
As of 1st Ceremony fourteen categories were set open for online public voting's in viewers choice categories, from 9 April to 25 April. All the categories were made by AFA's Jury members and AFA's membership as a whole, but Viewers Choice portion were voted by public and winners were declared according to highest votes gain by relevant winner. Online voting system proves enormous beneficial in selecting winners by holding fairness among nominees, around ten million online voters votes for their actors and artists across the globe, and a special thank were given at the end of ceremony.

=== ARY Film Awards motto ===
Cinema and Film making in Pakistan makes an enormous hit comeback in the year 2013, with the name like Revisiting the death and Revival of Pakistani Cinema and phrases like New-wave, rebirth and revival become the tagline of every event that held in Pakistani Film Industry. Release of around seven Pakistani films throughout the country gave a much-needed push to aspiring local film-makers, it also produced a hyper-sentimental wave about the rise of Pakistan cinema, which masked the realities on the ground. The current year holds more promise for Pakistani cinema as more than two dozen productions are reportedly on the floor.

ARY Digital Network and Entertainment Channel joins hand with many film ventures and give birth to the new subsidiary to entire Group ARY Films, which mark the new milestone in Pakistani cinema foundation. ARY Films release thirty five films including 11 Urdu, 6 Punjabi and 17 Pashto films. Among them Waar, Main Hoon Shahid Afridi, Josh, Chambaili, Zinda Bhaag, Siyaah and Lamha tops the charts in industry and collects splendid box office performances on domestically and internationally. To celebrate the success of Pakistani cinema, ARY Films inaugurated First Film Awarding Ceremony after the demolishing of Nigar Awards, with the motto of "Celebrating the New Face of Cinema" to honor the films from all over the Pakistan, actors and technical achievements.

=== Box office performance of nominated films ===
At the time of the nominations announcement on 9 April 2014, the combined gross of the five Best Film nominees at the Pakistani box office was Rs 327.4 million, with an average of Rs 65.48 million per film. When nominations were revealed, Waar was the highest-grossing film among the Best Film nominees with Rs 230 million in domestic box office receipt. Main Hoon Shahid Afridi was the second highest-grossing film with Rs 55 million; this was followed by Chambaili and Zinda Bhaag tied with (Rs 20 million), and finally, Ishq Khuda (Rs 2.4 million).

Out of top-grossing movies of the year, all nominations went to 8 films. Only Waar, Main Hoon Shahid Afridi, Chambaili, Ishq Khuda and Zinda Bhaag were nominated for Best Film Jury, Best Film Viewers, or any of directing, acting or screenwriting awards. Other top box office hits that earned nominations were Josh, Lamha and Siyaah. Among best film nominees Zinda Bhaag was the film who achieve the success ride of critical reception which made its way to Oscars, the film was selected as the Official Pakistani entry for the Best Foreign Language Film at the 86th Academy Awards, the second film after 1950 Aina to achieve that feet in 50 years, but was out of the race in final five nominations for category.

=== Special screening of films ===
During the ceremony many upcoming Pakistani films were released through their trailers, press release or official announcement. Shaan Shahid released the first look of his upcoming film Arth 2, a joint venture of ARY Films and Riaz Shahid Films, this film is the remake of bollywood most controversial film Arth by Mahesh Bhatt. The second film which was screened was Kambakht a comedy-thriller starring Hamza Ali Abbasi., this was followed by first Pakistani art-film Mah-e-Meer starring Fahad Mustafa as Mir Taqi Mir. and Yasir Jaswal's Jalaibee was also screened where film's star cast promoted the film. Another one of the most awaited movie by mother-son Zeba Bakhtiar and Azaan Sami Khan's O21 (formally known as The Extortionist) directed by Summer Nicks was revealed.

Chairman of ARY Group Salman Iqbal and Oscar-winner filmmaker Sharmeen Obaid-Chinoy revealed the first look of Pakistani first ever computer animated feature film 3 Bahadur, based on the story of 3 extraordinary children's with the enthusiasm of removing hate and evil from Pakistan. 3 Bahadur or 3B is a joint venture of ARY Films and SOB Films, and film is all set to release in summer 2015.

== ARY Film Awards categories ==
ARY Film Awards were awarded in three rendered portion of categories which includes Jury Choice, Viewers Choice or Popular and Technical Awards, except Viewers All categories were awarded by AFA's Jury.

=== Jury choice ===
As of 1st Ceremony, this portion contains only Four Categories which were also included in Viewers Choice, in order to put forth justice, Jury themselves awarded Best Film, Best Director, Best Actress and Best Actor. For Jury Choice Categories no nominations were made, all categories contains solo win.

=== Viewers Choice ===
Popular or Viewers Choice awards were the main and highlight of show, total of 14 categories were announced with multiple nominations on 9 April, for public voting's till 25 April on awards official website. Viewers Choice portion were voted by millions of viewers around the globe, at the ceremony special thank were given to voters from Canada, UK, America and Pakistan.

=== Technical ===
Technical Awards were also completely based on Jury Decision, total of 11 categories were made and announced on 25 April at awards website, all the categories were contains solo nominations and solo win. Technical awards were the first set of awards presented first at ceremony.

== Controversies ==
The biggest catch of the evening was the war of dialogues between actors Shaan and Ali, which turns this happening in to evening then controversy. Shaan used his opening monologue to address patriotism, and the lack thereof, in the Pakistani industry. Specifically calling out artists who accept work from across the Indian border, he labeled all those who choose to work outside Pakistan as unpatriotic sell-outs. At the occasion, where he also unveiled the first look of his upcoming film Arth 2, he blamed local celebrities for making Bollywood a stairway to their success. Shaan's comment was seen as a thinly veiled dig at Ali Zafar, who was set to receive the International Icon Award of Pakistan later that night. In replied when Ali come up to stage to receive his honorary award said that we make excuses to hide our weaknesses, sometimes, in the name of patriotism, sometimes, in the name of other things. We should speak the truth and the time has come when the new generation should be told the truth. Ali mentioned that calling him an unpatriotic means calling artists like, Ghulam Ali, Zeba Bakhtiar, Nusrat Fateh Ali Khan, Rahat Fateh Ali Khan, Atif Aslam and many more who have made their mark in India through their work and have received tremendous appreciation for it, unpatriotic too. Aftermath in press Shaan replies that "It hurts to see when your own misunderstand you. Ali Zafar needs to understand when I said undersell it means you are worth more than you are selling for positivity is a sign that show us that ego is not making your decisions. I havent lost until my own leave my side. I hope you understand as I still have hope that one day you will realize we are all green and have a place next to the crescent on our flag, he added." Many critics and filmmakers favors Shaan like Altaf Hussain, Chaudhry Ijaz Kaleem while director-writer Pervaiz Kaleem said that "Shaan evidently loves his nation and advocates inhabitant firmness while thespian Ali Zafar is ignorant about such nationalistic emotions.'Our nation is a identity'. What is discernible is to use a talent for a possess country. Ali Zafar needs to call Shaan Shahid and apologize to him."

== See also ==
- 4th Pakistan Media Awards
- 2nd Hum Awards
