= ARY Film Award for Best Director =

Pakistani film award

- Awarded for: "Excellence in cinematic direction achievement"
- Country: Pakistan
- Presented by: ARY Digital Network and Entertainment Channel
- First award: 2014 (for direction in films released in 2013 film season)
- Currently held by: Nadeem Beyg, Jawani Phir Nahi Ani (2016)
- Website: aryfilmawards.com

The ARY Film Award for Best Director (officially known as the ARY Film Award for Best Directing) is an award presented annually by the ARY Digital Network and Entertainment Channel. It is given in honor of a film director who has exhibited outstanding directing while working in the film industry. The 1st ARY Film Awards were held in 2014 and Bilal Lashari was given this award for his direction for Waar. Currently, nominees are determined by single transferable vote within the directors branch of ARY Digital Network while winners are selected by a public voting.

In order to maintain the balance and authenticity, Best Director - Jury is also presented at ceremony, where winners are only revealed during the ceremony based on Jury votings. The ARY Film Award for Best Directing and Best Film have been very closely linked throughout their history. At first year ceremony both awards were presented to Waar. As of 2016 Ceremony, Nadeem Beyg is the most recent winner in this category for his work in Jawani Phir Nahi Ani.

== History ==
The best film director category originates with the 1st ARY Film Awards ceremony since 2014. The Best Film Director of Best Director is awarded by viewers voting and known as Best Director Viewers Choice but officially it is termed as Best Director. Since ARY Film Awards has been just started, this category has not a brief history. The name of the category officially termed by the channel is:

- 2013 → present: ARY Film Award for Best Director

== Winners and nominees ==
In the list below, winners are listed first in the colored row, followed by the other nominees. The year shown is the one in which the film first released; normally this is also the year before the ceremony at which the award is given; for example, a film exhibited theatrically during 2005 was eligible for consideration for the 2005 Best Film ARY Awards, awarded in 2006. The number of the ceremony (1st, 2nd, etc.) appears in parentheses after the awards year, linked to the article on that ceremony/ Each individual entry shows the title followed by the production company, and the producer. Till from 2013, the Best Drama Serial award has given to producer rather than to Production company.

As of the first ceremony, total of six films were nominated for seven directors. This category is among two Best Film Director Awards that is given to Best Film's. Best Film Director Jury winner is eligible to be nominated among Best Film Director and may won the Both awards. This category is among Viewers Section Awards in ARY Film Awards that are awarded on the basis of public voting.

For the first ceremony, the eligibility period spanned full calendar years. For example, the 1st ARY Film Awards presented on 25 May 2014, to recognized films that were released between January 2013 to December 2013, the period of eligibility is the full previous calendar year from 1 January to 31 December.

Date and the award ceremony shows that the 2010 is the period from 2010 to 2020 (10 years-decade), while the year above winners and nominees shows that the film year in which they were releases, and the figure in bracket shows the ceremony number, for example; an award ceremony is held for the films of its previous year.

=== 2010s ===
Table key
‡	Indicates the winner

Year	Director(s)	Film	Ref.
2013 1st	Bilal Lashari‡	Waar	
2013 1st	Ismail Jilani	Chambaili	
2013 1st	Shahzad Rafique	Ishq Khuda	
2013 1st	Syed Ali Raza Usama	Main Hoon Shahid Afridi	
2013 1st	Azfar Jafri	Siyaah	
2013 1st	Meenu Gaur and Farjad Nabi	Zinda Bhaag	
Ceremony wasn't held for 2014 films in 2015
2015 2nd	TBD ‡	TBD	
2015 2nd	Nadeem Baig	Jawani Phir Nahi Ani	
2015 2nd	Wajahat Rauf	Karachi Se Lahore	
2015 2nd	Sarmad Sultan Khoosat	Manto	
2015 2nd	Jami	Moor	
2015 2nd	Adnan Sarwar	Shah	
2015 2nd	Yasir Nawaz	Wrong No.	
