= ARY Film Award for Best Actress =

Pakistani film award

- Awarded for: Best Performance by an Actress in a Leading Role
- Country: Pakistan
- Presented by: ARY Digital Network and Entertainment Channel
- First award: 2014 (for the films released in 2013)
- Currently held by: Sohai Ali Abro, Jawani Phir Nahi Ani (2015)
- Website: aryfilmawards.com

The ARY Film Award for Best Actress is one of the ARY Film Awards of Merit presented annually by the ARY Digital Network and Entertainment Channel to female actor working in the film industry. Best Actress is considered to be one of five most important awards of the ARY Film Awards, as it represents the main icon of cinematic industry on which all aspects of film such as directing, acting, music composing, writing, editing and other efforts that put forth into a drama is depending. This award is one of the two Best Actress awards in ceremony, in which one is awarded to relevant film actress only by the decision of ceremony Jury, while other is being awarded on Viewers Voting's.

== History ==
The Best Actress category originates with the 1st ARY Film Awards ceremony since 2014. The Best Actress is awarded by viewers voting and known as Best Actress Viewers Choice but officially it is termed as Best Actress. Since ARY Film Awards has been just started, this category has not a brief history.

== Winners and nominees ==
For the Best Actress winner which is decided by Viewers, but simply regarded as Best Actress as compared to other Best Actress Award which has superfix of Best Actress Jury. As of the first ceremony, total of five actresses were nominated, any actor who won Jury award can eligible for nomination in Viewers choice awards. This category is among fourteen Viewers Awards.

Date and the award ceremony shows that the 2010 is the period from 2010–20 (decade), while the year above winners and nominees shows that the film year in which they were releases, and the figure in bracket shows the ceremony number, for example; an award ceremony is held for the films of its previous year.

Indicates the winner

Year	Actress	Film	Role	Ref
2013 (1st)	Ayesha Khan	Waar	Javeria Khattak	
2013 (1st)	Mahnoor Baloch	Main Hoon Shahid Afridi	Sara	
2013 (1st)	Aamina Sheikh	Lamha	Maliha	
2013 (1st)	Amna Ilyas	Zinda Bhaag	Rubina	
2013 (1st)	Hareem Farooq	Siyaah	Nartasha	
Ceremony wasn't held for 2014 films in 2015
2015 (2nd)	Mehwish Hayat	Jawani Phir Nahi Ani	Marina	
2015 (2nd)	Sohai Ali Abro	Jawani Phir Nahi Ani	Zoya	
2015 (2nd)	Sohai Ali Abro	Wrong No.	Laila	
2015 (2nd)	Ayesha Omer	Karachi Se Lahore	Maryam	
2015 (2nd)	Sania Saeed	Manto	Safya	
2015 (2nd)	Sonya Hussain	Moor	Amber	
