= ARY Film Award for Best Independent Film =

Pakistani film award

- Awarded for: Best Independent Film of the Year
- Country: Pakistan
- Presented by: ARY Digital Network and Entertainment Channel
- First award: 2014 (for the films released in 2013)
- Currently held by: Josh (2013)
- Website: aryfilmawards.com

The ARY Film Award for Best Independent Film is one of the ARY Film Awards of Merit presented annually by the ARY Digital Network and Entertainment Channel to best Independent Film.

== History ==
The Best Independent Film category originates with the 1st ARY Film Awards ceremony since 2014. This category has been given to the Best Independent Film by Viewers Voting, but simply called as Best Independent Film. Since ARY Film Awards has been just started, this category has not a brief history.

== Winners and nominees ==
In the list below, winners are listed first in the colored row, followed by the other nominees. The year shown is the one in which the film first released; normally this is also the year before the ceremony at which the award is given; for example, a film exhibited theatrically during 2005 was eligible for consideration for the 2005 Best Film ARY Awards, awarded in 2006. The number of the ceremony (1st, 2nd, etc.) appears in parentheses after the awards year, linked to the article on that ceremony/ Each individual entry shows the title followed by the production company, and the producer.

As of the first ceremony, total of three Independent Film were nominated, and only one film bags the nomination in Best Film category which is another and most highlighted category.

For the first ceremony, the eligibility period spanned full calendar years. For example, the 1st ARY Film Awards presented on May 35, 2015, to recognized films that were released between January, 2013, and December, 2013, the period of eligibility is the full previous calendar year from 1 January to 31 December.

Date and the award ceremony shows that the 2010 is the period from 2010-2020 (10 years-decade), while the year above winners and nominees shows that the film year in which they were releases, and the figure in bracket shows the ceremony number, for example; an award ceremony is held for the films of its previous year.

=== 2010s ===
2014 (1st)
Independent Film	Production company(s)	Producer(s)
Josh	Parveen Shah Productions and Twenty Nine Dash One Productions	Iram Parveen Bilal, Saad Bin Mujeeb and Kelly Thomas.
Lamha	--	Meher Jaffri, Summer Nicks and Craig Peter Jones
Siyaah	IRK Films	Imran Raza Kazmi
