= ARY Film Award for Best Female Playback Singer =

Pakistani film award

- Awarded for: Best Female Playback Singer of the Year
- Country: Pakistan
- Presented by: ARY Digital Network and Entertainment Channel
- First award: 2014 (for the films released in 2013)
- Currently held by: Abida Parveen, Ishq Khuda (2013)
- Website: aryfilmawards.com

The ARY Film Award for Best Female Playback Singer is one of the ARY Film Awards of Merit presented annually by the ARY Digital Network and Entertainment Channel to female playback singer, who has delivered an outstanding performance in a film song while working in the film industry.

== History ==
The Best Female Playback Singer category originates with the 1st ARY Film Awards ceremony since 2014. This category has been given to the Best Female Playback Singer by Viewers Voting, but simply called as Best Female Playback Singer. Since ARY Film Awards has been just started, this category has not a brief history. The name of the category officially termed by the channel is:

== Winners and nominees ==
For the Best Female Playback Singer winner which is decided by Viewers, but simply regarded as Best Female Playback Singer as compared to other four Jury Awards which has superfix of Jury. As of the first ceremony, total of five female singers were nominated. This category is among fourteen Viewers Awards in ARY Film Awards.

Date and the award ceremony shows that the 2010 is the period from 2010-2020 (10 years-decade), while the year above winners and nominees shows that the film year in which they were releases, and the figure in bracket shows the ceremony number, for example; an award ceremony is held for the films of its previous year.

=== 2010s ===
Year	Winning Singer(s) - Female	Nominees	Ref
2013 (1st)	Abida Parveen – "Ishq Khuda" – Ishq Khuda	Sanam Marvi – "Sauf Supari wala paan" from Ishq Khuda; Zoe Viccaji – "Jab Koi" from Lamha; Iqra Ali – "Kuri Yes A" from Zinda Bhaag; Neeti Wagh – "Masti Mein Doobi" from Main Hoon Shahid Afridi	
Ceremony wasn't held for 2014 films in 2015
2015 (2nd)	TBA	Sara Raza Khan – "Dheeray Dheeray" from Wrong No.; Meesha Shafi – "Mehram Dilaan De Mahi" from Manto; Sara Haider – "Tauba Tauba" from Dekh Magar Pyar Se; Sana Zulfiqar – "Jalwa" from Jawani Phir Nahi Ani; Ghazal Ali – "Jawani" from Jalaibee	
