= ARY Film Award for Best Male Playback Singer =

Pakistani film award

- Awarded for: Best Male Playback Singer of the Year
- Country: Pakistan
- Presented by: ARY Digital Network and Entertainment Channel
- First award: 2014 (for the films released in 2013)
- Currently held by: Rahat Fateh Ali Khan, Zinda Bhaag (2013)
- Website: aryfilmawards.com

The ARY Film Award for Best Male Playback Singer is one of the ARY Film Awards of Merit presented annually by the ARY Digital Network and Entertainment Channel to male playback singer, who has delivered an outstanding performance in a film song while working in the film industry.

== History ==
The Best Male Playback Singer category originates with the 1st ARY Film Awards ceremony since 2014. This category has been given to the Best Male Playback Singer by Viewers Voting, but simply called as Best Male Playback Singer. Since ARY Film Awards has been just started, this category has not a brief history. The name of the category officially termed by the channel is:

== Winners and nominees ==
For the Best Male Playback Singer winner which is decided by Viewers, but simply regarded as Best Male Playback Singer as compared to other four Jury Awards which has superfix of Jury. As of the first ceremony, total of five Male singers were nominated. This category is among fourteen Viewers Awards in ARY Film Awards.

Date and the award ceremony shows that the 2010 is the period from 2010-2020 (10 years-decade), while the year above winners and nominees shows that the film year in which they were releases, and the figure in bracket shows the ceremony number, for example; an award ceremony is held for the films of its previous year.

=== 2010s ===
Year	Winning Singer(s) - Male	Nominees	Ref
2013 1st	Rahat Fateh Ali Khan – "Pata Yaar Da" – Zinda Bhaag	Abrar-ul-Haq – "Pani Da Bulbula" from Zinda Bhaag; Umair Jaswal – "Khayal" from Waar; Shafqat Amanat Ali – "Jera Vi Hai Aanday" from Main Hoon Shahid Afridi; Rahat Fateh Ali Khan – "Malal" from Main Hoon Shahid Afridi	
Ceremony wasn't held for 2014 films in 2015
2015 (2nd)	TBA	Nabeel Shaukat Ali – "Nachay Mann" from Wrong No.; Asrar – "Bhaag Ja" from Wrong No.; Ali Sethi – "Aah Ko Chahiye" from Manto; Mika Singh – "Khul Jaye Botal" from Jawani Phir Nahi Ani; Umair Jaswal – "Jalaibee" from Jalaibee; Rahat Fateh Ali Khan – "Saroor De" from Halla Gulla	
