= ARY Film Award for Best Dialogue =

Pakistani film award

- Awarded for: Best Original Dialogues of the year in film
- Country: Pakistan
- Presented by: ARY Digital Network and Entertainment Channel
- First award: 2014 (for the films released in 2013)
- Currently held by: Vasay Chaudhry; Main Hoon Shahid Afridi (2013)
- Website: aryfilmawards.com

The ARY Film Award for Best Dialogue is the ARY Film Award for the best dialogues of the year in film. It is one of three writing awards in Technical Awarding category.

== History ==
The Best Dialogues category originates with the 1st ARY Film Awards ceremony since 2014. This category has been given to the best Dialogues written for the films of previous year to the ceremony held by Jury selection.

== Winners and Nominees ==
As of 2014, No nominations were made, winner selection and nomination were wholly made by AFAS Jury of Technical award.

=== 2010s ===
Year	Film	Dialogue-writer(s)
2013 (1st)
2013 (1st)	Main Hoon Shahid Afridi	Vasay Chaudhry
