= Zinda Bhaag =

2013 film by Meenu Gaur

- Theatrical release poster
- Directed by: Meenu Gaur; Farjad Nabi
- Produced by: Mazhar Zaidi
- Starring: Naseeruddin Shah; Zain Afzal; Amna Ilyas; Khurram Patras; Salman Ahmad Khan; Zohaib Asghar; Samiya Mumtaz; Rahat Fateh Ali Khan
- Cinematography: Satya Rai Nagpaul
- Edited by: Shan Muhammed; Fahad Bajwa; Faizan Yousuf
- Music by: Sahir Ali Bagga
- Production company: Matteela Films
- Distributed by: ARY Films; Footprint Entertainment
- Release date: 20 September 2013
- Running time: 120 minutes
- Country: Pakistan
- Language: Punjabi
- Box office: Rs. 7.5 million (US$27,000) first week from Pakistan Rs. 2 crore (US$72,000) total gross from Pakistan

Zinda Bhaag (Urdu: زندہ بھاگ) is a 2013 Pakistani Punjabi-language drama film co-directed by Meenu Gaur and Farjad Nabi, and produced by Mazhar Zaidi. The film focuses on the issue of illegal migration. The film had a premiere on 19 September 2013 and a theatrical release on 20 September. The film was selected as the Pakistani entry for the Best Foreign Language Film at the 86th Academy Awards, the first in over 50 years to be submitted for nomination since Gunghat in 1963. The film was made as part of a project on masculinity titled Let's Talk Men, affiliated with United Nations agencies for the prevention of gender-based violence.

== Plot ==
Zinda Bhaag focuses on the theme of illegal immigration, highlighting the issue and the epicentre of this trend within Punjab. The story of Zinda Bhaag unravels the theme of illegal immigration, called 'dunky'. This involves inhuman and dangerous methods of crossing borders into foreign lands. It is a film about three young men trying to escape the reality of their everyday lives and succeeding in ways they had least expected. In a nondescript neighbourhood of cities like Lahore, Gujranwala, Gujrat and Wazirabad within Punjab, three friends are desperate to get onto the fast track to success. Khaldi, Taambi, and Chitta, all in their early twenties, believe that the only way out is to the West. The journey that unfolds through the story of this film gives us an insight into what constitutes the everyday lives of many young men and women in Pakistan – a sense of entitlement that cannot be fulfilled, desperation to somehow prove themselves in the face of all legitimate doors being locked, and an ennui from which they feel there is no getaway.

== Cast ==
- Zain Afzal as Khoota
- Naseeruddin Shah as Puhlwan
- Amna Ilyas as Rubina
- Khurram Patras as Khaldi
- Salman Ahmad Khan as Chitta
- Zohaib Asghar as Taambi
- Ibrahim Rauf Khawaja as Ibrahim
- Samiya Mumtaz as Elite Woman
- Rahat Fateh Ali Khan as Rahat
- Naeema Butt as Mrs. Auqaat
- Naghma as Ami Ji

== Soundtrack ==
=== Track listing ===
The original soundtrack (OST) of the film is sung by Rahat Fateh Ali Khan. The film's music features the voices of Abrarul Haq, Arif Lohar, and Saleema Jawwad. Lohar and Jawwad have sung a song on love and death while Bagga has contributed his vocals to two tracks, an upbeat dance-bhangra number and a romantic ballad.

No.	Title	Singer(s)	Length
1.	"Paar Channah"	Arif Lohar & Saleema Jawad	04:00
2.	"Saari Saari Raat"	Sahir Ali Bagga, Farah Anwar	04:00
3.	"Dekhenge"	Jabar Abbas	04:00
4.	"Taariyan"	Sahir Ali Bagga	04:00
5.	"Pani da Bulbula"	Abrar ul Haq	04:00
6.	"Pata Yaar Da"	Rahat Fateh Ali Khan	04:00
7.	"Kurri Yes A"	Amanat Ali, Iqra Ali	04:00
Total length:			28:00

== Release ==
The first look of Zinda Bhaag's trailer was unveiled on 18 June 2013. This film was earlier set to release on 6 September. Due to a backlog of unreleased films, the release of 'Zinda Bhaag' was postponed. It released on 20 September 2013. 'Zinda Bhaag' had been released in 10 states in the US as well on 18 October 2013. Zinda Bhaag screened during the seventh edition of the National Film Development Corporation (NFDC) initiative Film Bazaar, (20 November 2013) in Goa. The film also released in India. The film arrived at Abu Dhabi Film Festival (24 October – 2 November 2013) and consequently was theatrically released in the UAE.

=== Home Media ===
It was subsequently released on Netflix in 2015.

== Reception ==
=== Critical reception ===
Los Angeles Times critic Robert Abele described the film as "defiantly unslick" and "serious-minded about dramatizing the limited opportunities for a struggling class of Pakistanis," though he found it "regrettably uneven." He praised the lead performances but noted that "the many story strands often get away from the filmmakers," concluding that "if its Oscar chances prove slim, 'Zinda Bhaag' is thoughtful enough to bode well for the possibility of noteworthy Pakistani imports in years to come."

The Express Tribune gave the film a positive review, calling it "the most beautiful and complex film to come from Pakistan in decades" and stating that it "proves that great storytelling does not need massive budgets or a Bollywood repertoire." The review praised the performances, particularly Amna Ilyas as Rubina, and Sahir Ali Bagga's music, describing it as "an essential element in the construction of the ebbs and flows in the film." It concluded that "in the hearts of Pakistanis everywhere, when they see Zinda Bhaag, they already know it's a winner." A separate review for the same publication by Rafay Mahmood scored the film 4/5, calling it "a must watch" and "the best film to have come out of modern day Pakistani cinema." Mahmood praised the "naturally raw Lahori accent," the "snappy cinematography," and Naseeruddin Shah's performance as Pehlvan, though he criticised Amna Ilyas's dialogue delivery and felt the songs sometimes became "a needless deviation."

Dawn praised the film's tightly edited narrative and "pertinently shot" sequences, noting that the screenplay "never stoops to overburden the ambiance with undue theatrics." The review highlighted the "near perfect casting" of the three leads and described the film as an "amalgam where everything blends together, yet stands out on its own."

Hindustan Times was more critical, calling the film "meandering and muddled." The review stated that "the movie wants to say too many things in about two hours, and so appears jumbled with many of the scenes seemingly out of the place," and that "the colours jar, so do the songs. Too many of them are a drag on the narrative, making it appear even more jumbled."

In a letter to The Express Tribune, a reader wrote that "it would be a pity if the Oscar jury fails to appreciate the nuances of Zinda Bhaag's cleverly conceived script," adding that "the film's narrative of frustrations endured by the young in Pakistan is weaved with restrained subtlety and intelligent humour."

== Accolades ==
The film won four awards at the International South Asian Film Festival in Canada. The film won a 'Special Jury Award' at the Jaipur International Film Festival. The film also received five awards including Best Film (Jury) at the ARY Film Awards held under the aegis of the Pakistani TV channel network, ARY Digital Network. The film also won 'Best Film', 'Best Director' (Meenu & Farjad) and 'Best Actor' (Khurram Patras) in Pakistan's prestigious 'Lux Style Awards' and the 'Student Jury Award' at Festival du Film d'Asie du Sud Transgressif (FFAST) in Paris. The film received a total of 19-nominations at the first ARY Film Awards tying with Main Hoon Shahid Afridi.

Nominated year of work	Award	Category	Recipient(s)	Result
2013	1st ARY Film Awards	Best Film Jury	Mazhar Zaidi	Won
2013	1st ARY Film Awards	Best Film	Mazhar Zaidi	Nominated
2013	1st ARY Film Awards	Best Director	Meenu Gaur and Farjad Nabi	Nominated
2013	1st ARY Film Awards	Best Actress Jury	Amna Ilyas	Won
2013	1st ARY Film Awards	Best Actor	Khurram Patras	Nominated
2013	1st ARY Film Awards	Best Actress	Amna Ilyas	Nominated
2013	1st ARY Film Awards	Best Supporting Actor	Salman Ahmad	Nominated
2013	1st ARY Film Awards	Best Supporting Actress	Naghma Beghum	Nominated
2013	1st ARY Film Awards	Best Star Debut Male	Khurram Patras	Nominated
2013	1st ARY Film Awards	Best Star Debut Female	Amna Ilyas	Nominated
2013	1st ARY Film Awards	Best Actor in a Comic Role	Zohaib Asghar	Nominated
2013	1st ARY Film Awards	Best Actor in a Negative Role	Naseeruddin Shah	Nominated
2013	1st ARY Film Awards	Best Original Music	Sahir Ali Bagga	Nominated
2013	1st ARY Film Awards	Best Male Playback Singer	Rahat Fateh Ali Khan	Won
2013	1st ARY Film Awards	Best Male Playback Singer	Abrar-ul-Haq	Nominated
2013	1st ARY Film Awards	Best Female Playback Singer	Iqra Ali	Nominated
2013	1st ARY Film Awards	Best Story	Meenu Gaur and Farjad Nabi	Won
2013	1st ARY Film Awards	Best Background Score	Sahir Ali Bagga	Won
2013	13th Lux Style Awards	Lux Style Award for Best Film	Mazhar Zaidi	Won
2013	13th Lux Style Awards	Lux Style Award for Best Film Director	Meenu Gaur and Farjad Nabi	Won
2013	13th Lux Style Awards	Lux Style Award for Best Film Actor	Khurram Patras	Won
2013	13th Lux Style Awards	Lux Style Award for Best Film Actress	Amna Ilyas	Nominated
2013	13th Lux Style Awards	Lux Style Award for Best Original Soundtrack	Mazhar Zaidi	Nominated
2013	4th Pakistan Media Awards	Pakistan Media Award for Best Film	Mazhar Zaidi	Nominated
2013	4th Pakistan Media Awards	Pakistan Media Award for Best Film Director	Meenu Gaur and Farjad Nabi	Nominated
2013	4th Pakistan Media Awards	Pakistan Media Award for Best Film Actor	Khurram Patras	Nominated
2013	4th Pakistan Media Awards	Pakistan Media Award for Best Film Actress	Amna Ilyas	Nominated

== See also ==
- List of Pakistani films of 2013
- List of submissions to the 86th Academy Awards for Best Foreign Language Film
- List of Pakistani submissions for the Academy Award for Best International Feature Film
