= ARY Film Awards pre-show =

The ARY Film pre-show (currently known as ARY Film Red Carpet) is a recorded televised pre-show which precedes the start of the Pakistan ARY Film Awards telecast by 37 minutes. The pre-show takes place on the red carpet surrounding the theater which holds the telecast, and is almost always hosted by various media personalities.

The red carpet of ARY Film begins half an hour before the ceremony starts, it includes interviews and the welcome arrival of all the guests, nominees and others on the ceremony. 1st ARY Film Awards red carpet ceremony was hosted at Golf Club Karachi.

== History ==
As of 1st ARY Film Awards the pre-show or red carpet is held half an hour or 45-minutes before the actual ceremony starts as the red carpet and event went live without telecast for the audience. 1st ARY Film Awards and Red carpet were both recorded as per the decision by ARY Digital Network management team.

== Host ==
The pre-show usually employs the use of recent TV or media personalities as the hosts, who interview the nominees and attendees and sometimes introduce special segments in the moments preceding the ceremony. Below is a listing of the hosts of the pre-show since the 1st ARY Film Awards ceremony held in 2014:

=== 2013 ===
- Mawra Hocane

== Title ==
Most recently it is known as the "ARY Film Awards Red Carpet", but it is also known as the ARY Film Awards pre-show, but more knowledgeably it is known as Red Carpet.

== See also ==
- List of ARY Film Awards ceremonies
