= ARY Film Award for Best Film =

Pakistani film award

- Awarded for: Best Film of the Year
- Country: Pakistan
- Presented by: ARY Digital Network and Entertainment Channel
- First award: 2014 (for the films released in 2013)
- Currently held by: Waar (2013)
- Website: aryfilmawards.com

The ARY Film Award for Best Film is one of the ARY Film Awards of Merit presented annually by the ARY Digital Network and Entertainment Channel to producers working in the film industry and is the only category in which every member is eligible to submit a nomination. Best Film is considered the most important of the ARY Film Awards, as it represents all the directing, acting, music composing, writing, editing and other efforts put forth into a drama. This award is one of the two Best Film awards in a ceremony one is awarded to a relevant film only on the decision of the ceremony Jury, while the other is awarded on Viewers Voting's.

== History ==
=== Category Name ===
The best film category originates with the 1st ARY Film Awards ceremony in 2014. This category has been given to the best film of the previous year in the ceremony held by Viewers Voting, but simply called Best Film, rather than Best Film Jury which is decided by Jury and officially called Best Film Jury or Best Jury Film. Since ARY Film Awards has been just started, this category has not a brief history. The name of the category officially termed by the channel is:

- 2014 → present: ARY Film Award for Best Film

== Winners and nominees ==
In the list below, winners are listed first in the colored row, followed by the other nominees. The year shown is the one in which the film first released; normally this is also the year before the ceremony at which the award is given; for example, a film exhibited theatrically during 2005 was eligible for consideration for the 2005 Best Film ARY Awards, awarded in 2006. The number of the ceremony (1st, 2nd, etc.) appears in parentheses after the awards year, linked to the article on that ceremony/ Each entry shows the title followed by the production company, and the producer. Since 2013, the Best Drama Serial award has been given to the producer rather than to the Production company.

As of the first ceremony, total of five films were nominated, and all the five films were nominated in all categories except one. This category is among two Best Film Awards that is given to Best Film's. Best Film Jury winner is eligible to be nominated among Best Film and may won the Both awards.

For the first ceremony, the eligibility period spanned full calendar years. For example, the 1st ARY Film Awards presented on May 35, 2015, to recognized films that were released between January, 2013, and December, 2013, the period of eligibility is the full previous calendar year from 1 January to 31 December.

The date and the award ceremony show that 2010 is the period from 2010-2020 (10 years-decade), while the year above winners and nominees shows that the film year in which they were released, and the figure in bracket shows the ceremony number, for example; an award ceremony is held for the films of its previous year.

=== 2010s ===
2013 (1st)
Film	Production company(s)	Producer(s)
Waar	MindWorks Media	Hassan Waqas Rana
Chambaili	7th Sky Entertainment	Abdullah Kadwani and Shahzad Nawaz
Ishq Khuda	Sound View Production	Shafquat Chaudhry
Main Hoon Shahid Afridi	Six Sigma Entertainment	Humayun Saeed and Shahzad Nasib
Zinda Bhaag	Matteela Films	Mazhar Zaidi

2014
Ceremony wasn't held for 2014 films in 2015

2015 (2nd)
Film	Production company(s)	Producer(s)
Jawani Phir Nahi Ani	Six Sigma Plus	Salman Iqbal, Humayun Saeed, Shahzad Nasib and Jarjees Seja
Karachi Se Lahore	Wajahat Rauf	Showcase Communication Films
Manto	A&B Entertainment	Babar Javed
Moor	Azad Film Company and Mandviwalla Entertainment	Nazira Ali, Nadeem Mandviwalla and Jami
Wrong No.	YNH Films	Yasir Nawaz, Nida Yasir and Hassan Zia
