= ARY Film Award for Best Action =

Pakistani film award

- Country: Pakistan
- Presented by: ARY Digital Network and Entertainment Channel
- First award: 2014 (for the films released in 2013)
- Currently held by: Hassan Waqas Rana, Waar (2013)
- Website: aryfilmawards.com

The ARY Film Award for Best Action is an ARY Film Award that is awarded each year to an action director for work in one particular motion picture. It is one of eleven awards in the technical awards category.

== History ==
The Best Cinematography category originates with the 1st ARY Film Awards ceremony in 2014. The category has been given to the best action director for his/her work on films from the previous year to the ceremony held by jury selection.

== Winners and nominees ==
As of 2014, no nominations were made; the winner selection and nomination were wholly made by the AFAS jury of Technical award.

=== 2010s ===
Year	Film	Action Director
2013 (1st)
2013 (1st)	Waar	Hassan Waqas Rana
