= ARY Film Award for Best Actress Jury =

Pakistani film award

ARY Film Award for Best Actor Jury
- Awarded for: Best Performance by an Actor in a Leading Role Decided by Jury
- Country: Pakistan
- Presented by: ARY Digital Network and Entertainment Channel
- First award: 2014 (for the films released in 2013)
- Currently held by: Sania Saeed, Manto (2015)
- Website: aryfilmawards.com

The ARY Film Award for Best Actress Jury is one of the ARY Film Awards of Merit presented annually by the ARY Digital Network and Entertainment Channel to female actor working in the film industry. Best Actress Jury is one of four awards which are awarded by Jury and considered to be one of five most important awards of the ARY Film Awards, as it represents the main icon of cinematic industry on which all aspects of film such as directing, acting, music composing, writing, editing and other efforts put forth into a drama is depending. This award is one of the two Best Actress awards in ceremony, in which one is awarded to relevant film actor only by the decision of ceremony Jury, while the other is awarded on viewer votes.

== Winners and nominees ==
For the Best Actress winner decided by Jury has no nominations because such category is decided by Jury to honor the best actress, without considering others to nominate in this category. As of the first ceremony, only one winner was announced during the ceremony which was Jury decision based winner. This category is among four Jury Awards in ARY Film Awards that has only one win and one nomination.

Date and the award ceremony shows that the 2010 is the period from 2010-2020 (10 years-decade), while the year above winners and nominees shows that the film year in which they were releases, and the figure in bracket shows the ceremony number, for example; an award ceremony is held for the films of its previous year.

=== 2010s ===
Year	Actress	Film	Role	Ref
2013 (1st)	Amna Ilyas	Zinda Bhaag	Rubina	
2015 (2nd)	Sania Saeed	Manto	Safiya (Beghum Manto)	
