= Azfar Jafri =

Pakistani filmmaker

- اظفر جعفری
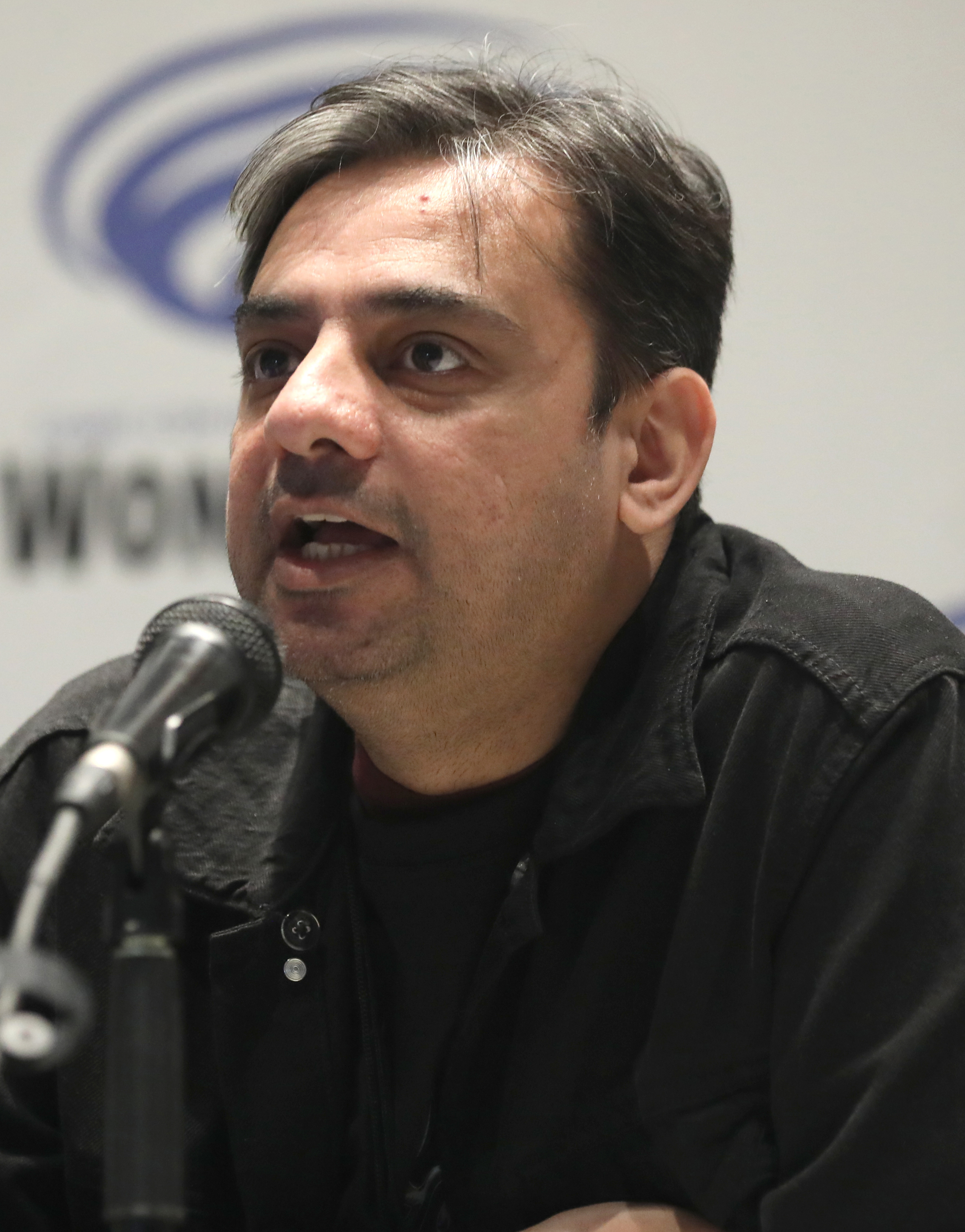
- Jafri at the 2024 WonderCon
- Born: Karachi, Pakistan
- Occupations: Film director, Visual effects specialist, Screenwriter, Actor
- Years active: 2005-present
- Notable work: Janaan
- Spouse: Ayesha Ali
- Website: www.azfarjfilms.com

Azfar Jafri (Urdu: اظفر جعفری) is a Pakistani film director, screenwriter, actor, and VFX artist. He is best known for his Independent film Siyaah which earned him critical recognition and accolades, including a nomination for the ARY Film Award for Best Director at the 1st ARY Film Awards.

== Career ==
Azfar started his career as a 3D character animator and eventually became a VFX lead at Trango, where he worked on several television commercials for both local and international clients, including Lexus, Scion, Nike, UPS & Mobilink-BlackBerry.

Azfar's independent short films led him to his first feature as a director, Siyaah, which was produced by Imran Raza Kazmi and written by Osman Khalid Butt.

He was the head of animation for the 2018 movie Allahyar and the Legend of Markhor, both a critical and commercial success, while also providing his voice for a key character, Hero.

Another 2019 release would be Heer Maan Ja, a Punjab-centered romantic flick with action, drama and comedy that would reunite the team that produced his previous hits: producer Imran Raza Kazmi, actors Ali Rehman Khan and Hareem Farooq as well as Osman Khalid Butt as choreographer.

== Filmography ==
Year	Film	Director	Screenwriter	Actor	Role	Notes
2005	Isthmus Road	No	Yes	Yes	Sameer	Debut; short film
2009	Charkhi	Yes	Yes	No		Directorial Debut; Short film
2010	Khel	Yes	Yes	No		Short film
2011	Aik Khat Tumharay Naam	Yes	No	No		Short film
2013	Siyaah	Yes	No	No		Feature film debut
2016	Janaan	Yes	No	No		
2018	Parchi	Yes	No	No		
2018	Allahyar and the Legend of Markhor	No	No	Yes	Hero (voice)	Head of Animation
2019	Sherdil	Yes	No	No		
2019	Heer Maan Ja	Yes	No	No		
2023	Allahyar and the 100 Flowers of God	No	No	Yes	Hero (voice)	Animated film
2024	Umro Ayyar – A New Beginning	Yes	No	No	Director	A fantasy VFX film

== Accolades ==
Ceremony	Category	Film	Result
13th Lux Style Awards	Best Film Director	Siyaah	Nominated
16th Lux Style Awards	Best Film Director	Jaanan	Nominated
