= Gardaab =

- گرداب
- Directed by: Harune Massey
- Written by: Harune Massey; Saleemullah Nasir
- Based on: Romeo and Juliet by William Shakespeare
- Produced by: Mazhar Zaidi
- Starring: Fawad Khan; Amna Ilyas; Gohar Rasheed; Adnan Shah Tipu; Nimra Bucha; Naseeruddin Shah
- Cinematography: Sajid Kashmiri
- Edited by: Fahad Bajwa
- Music by: Faiz Zaidi
- Production company: Matteela Films
- Distributed by: Matteela Films
- Release date: 1 December 2016
- Running time: 1:34:00
- Country: Pakistan
- Language: Urdu
- Budget: US$185,000

Gardaab (Urdu: گرداب; English: Whirlpool) is a 2016 Pakistani drama film directed by Harune Massey, written by Harune Massey, Saleemullah Nasir and produced by Mazhar Zaidi under the production banner of Matteela Films. The film features Fawad Khan and Amna Ilyas in the main cast. It also features Gohar Rasheed, Nimra Bucha, Adnan Shah Tipu, Mohammad Javed and Khalid Ahmed.

== Cast ==
- Fawad Khan as Shahbaz
- Amna Ilyas as Parveen
- Gohar Rasheed as Yousaf
- Adnan Shah Tipu as Maywa Jaan
- Nimra Bucha
- Mohammed Javed as Akmal
- Khalid Ahmed as Firdous Khan
- Shama Askari as Miss Christina
- Arif Hassan as Abdullah Jaan
- Gule Rana as Mother

== Production ==
Whilst speaking to Express Tribune, producer Mazhar Zaidi said the film was about a serious love story which was set against the bacdrop of Karachi, which has suffered a lot of turmoil. Director Harune Massey originally had planned to make a short film but due to the scale of the subject matter the project was turned into a feature-length romantic thriller. The film production began in 2015. Fawad Khan said of the plot that the film is a loose adaptation of Romeo and Juliet.

== See also ==
- List of Pakistani films of 2016

http://tns.thenews.com.pk/binge-watching-desi-films/#.WTxAUuvyvIV
