= Pappu Samrat =

Pakistani choreographer

- Born: 24 February 1970 (age 55); Lahore, Punjab, Pakistan
- Occupation: Choreographer
- Years active: 1990 – present
- Notable work: Mujhe Chaand Chahiye; International Guerillas; Main Hoon Shahid Afridi
- Relatives: Ashiq Hussain Samrat; Akbar Hussain Samrat; Khanu Hussain Samrat; Vicky Hussain Samrat

Shaukat Hussain Samrat (Urdu: شوکت حسین سمراٹ) (born 24 February 1970), best known by his screen name Pappu Samrat (Urdu: پپو سمراٹ), is a Pakistani choreographer.

He has choreographed music videos, stage shows and more than seventy films, including Mujhe Chand Chahiye (2000) for which he won Nigar Award of Best Choreographer at the 44th Nigar Awards. He won "Best Choreographer" at the 1st ARY Film Awards for Main Hoon Shahid Afridi (2013).

He is a part of the Pakistani choreography Samrat Family.

== Personal life ==
Pappu born on 24 February 1970 as a Shaukat Hussain to a Pakistani veteran choreographer family, The Samrat Family. Pappu's grandfather, Master Aashiq Hussain, where he was a choreographer and dancer, due to his service to dance he was awarded an alias of Samrat – meaning mighty and powerful. Pappu's father, Akbar Hussain Samrat, was also a Pakistani film choreographer and Pappu's brother Khanu was also a veteran choreographer, and Pappu's niece Vicky is an active choreographer along with his uncle.

== Career ==
Pappu started his career at the age of 19, where he learned dance from his father. He is a trained classical dancer and has done choreography in number of Pakistani films since the early 1990s and established himself as a film choreographer.

Due to the lack of films and no scope of dancing in Pakistan, Pappu said in an interview on World Dance Day, "Choreographers are given very limited time here. There isn't any time for rehearsing. Indians excel because Bollywood directors give a free hand to choreographers and over the years, Indian dancing has won a status for itself. Here, not many films are produced and directors don't let the choreographers work freely. Dancing is poetry of the body, but here it often becomes an exhibition of the body."

== Selected filmography ==
- Choorian (1998)
- Mujhe Chand Chahiye (2000)
- Majajan (2006)
- Love Mein Ghum (2011)
- Main Hoon Shahid Afridi (2013)

== Awards ==
- Nigar Awards: Best Choreographer – Mujhe Chaand Chahiye
- ARY Film Awards: Best Choreographer – Main Hoon Shahid Afridi
