= ARY Film Award for Best Story =

Pakistani film award

ARY Film Award for Best Original Story
- Awarded for: Best Original Screenplay of the year
- Country: Pakistan
- Presented by: ARY Digital Network and Entertainment Channel
- First award: 2014 (for the films released in 2013)
- Currently held by: Meenu Gaur & Farjad Nabi; Zinda Bhaag (2013)
- Website: aryfilmawards.com

The ARY Film Award for Best Story is the ARY Film Award for the best story of the year. It is one of three writing awards in Technical Awarding category.

== History ==
The Best Story category originates with the 1st ARY Film Awards ceremony since 2014. This category has been given to the best Stories for the films of previous year to the ceremony held by Jury selection.

== Winners and Nominees ==
As of 2014, No nominations were made, winner selection and nomination were wholly made by AFAS Jury of Technical award.

=== 2010s ===
Year	Film	Story-writer(s)
2013 (1st)
2013 (1st)	Zinda Bhaag	Meenu Gaur; Farjad Nabi
