= Mahnoor Baloch =

Pakistani actress and model

- ماہ نور بلوچ
- Born: Texas, U.S.
- Citizenship: Pakistani
- Occupations: Actress; model; director
- Years active: 1985 – present
- Spouse: Hameed Siddiqui (m. 1986)
- Children: 1

Mahnoor Baloch (Urdu: ماہ نور بلوچ) is an American-born Canadian Pakistani actress, film director and former model. Baloch made her television debut in 1993 with the drama serial Marvi, which aired on PTV. She is often praised by critics for her fitness and youthful looks on-screen.

== Career ==
Baloch appeared in the TV commercials of well-known brand names in Pakistan. In 1993, she made her acting debut in the PTV drama serial Marvi which was directed by Sultana Siddiqui. Her next series was Dusra Aasmaan. In this serial, she performed the role of Abid Ali's daughter.

In 2000, Mahnoor Baloch started directing and producing her drama serials. Her first serial as director was Lamhay. Later she directed another television series Patjhar Ki Chaioon, written by Syed Mohammad Ahmed.

In 2012, she won Lux Style Award for Best TV Actress for her role in the PTV drama series Talafi. She appeared in Geo TV's Eid special play Come On Hum Dum (2013) as the wife of co-star Mohib Mirza. She later appeared as the female lead in the Pakistani film Main Hoon Shahid Afridi (2013), for which she was nominated for Best Actress award at the 1st ARY Film Awards. For the role, she filmed an item song "Teri Hi Kami" alongside Mathira and Humayun Saeed, directed by Saqib Malik and produced and penned by Shani and Kami.

In 2013, Baloch made her Hollywood debut in Torn, playing the role of Maryam, a mother whose teenage son is killed in an explosion at a suburban mall.

== Filmography ==
=== Films ===
Year	Film	Role	Notes
2013	Main Hoon Shahid Afridi	Sara	
2013	Torn	Maryam	

=== Television ===
Year	TV Series	Role	Notes
1993	Marvi	Laila	
1999	Lamhay		
	Doosra Aasmaan		
	Shiddat		
	Unhoni		
	Sila		
	Kabhi Kabhi Pyar Mein		
2002	Chaandni Raatain	Maha	
2002	Patjhar ki Chaioon		
	Ye Zindagi		
	Jaane Kyun		
	Ab Ghar Jaane do		
2009	Noor Pur Ki Rani	Rania	
2010	Noor Bano	Noor Bano	
2011	Mohabbat Rooth Jaye Toh	Shumaila	
2011	Ladies Park	Soniya	
2012	Mehar Bano aur Shah Bano	Mehar Bano	
2012	Talafi	Falak	Lux Style Award for Best TV Actress
2012	Mera Saaein 2	Innaya	
2012	Ishq Ibadat		
2014	Pachtava	Ayeman	
2014	Pal Mein Ishq Pal Me Nahi	Michelle	
2016	Khoobsurat		
2019	Apni Apni Love Story	Sidra	

== Personal life ==
Baloch married Hameed Siddiqui at the age of 15. She has one daughter Laila Hameed, who got married in 2015. She became a grandmother in 2016.

== Awards and nominations ==
Year	Work	Award	Category	Result
2012	Talafi	Lux Style Awards	Best Television Actress	Won
2013	Main Hoon Shahid Afridi	Pakistan Media Awards	Best Film Actress	Nominated
2013	Main Hoon Shahid Afridi	ARY Film Awards	Best Actress	Nominated
