= ARY Film Award for Best Background Score =

Pakistani film award

- Country: Pakistan
- Presented by: ARY Digital Network and Entertainment Channel
- First award: 2014 (for the films released in 2013)
- Currently held by: Sahir Ali Bagga, Zinda Bhaag (2013)
- Website: aryfilmawards.com

The ARY Film Award for Best Background Score is an ARY Film Award presented annually to the best background music, a substantial body of music in the form of dramatic underscoring written specifically for the film by the submitting composer. It is one of eleven Technical Awarding categories.

== History ==
The Best Background Score category originated with the 1st ARY Film Awards ceremony in 2014. This category is awarded to the best Background Score Composer for their work in the films from the previous year, with the winner selected by a jury.

== Winners and nominees ==
As of 2014, no nominations were made; both winner selection and nomination were conducted solely by the AFAS Jury of Technical Awards.

=== 2010s ===
Year	Film	Background Composer(s)
2013 (1st)
2013 (1st)	Zinda Bhaag	Sahir Ali Bagga
