= ARY Film Award for Best Film Jury =

Pakistani film award

- Awarded for: Best Film of the Year decided by Jury
- Country: Pakistan
- Presented by: ARY Digital Network and Entertainment Channel
- First award: 2014 (for the films released in 2013)
- Currently held by: Jawani Phir Nahi Ani (2015)
- Website: aryfilmawards.com

The ARY Film Award for Best Film Jury is one of the ARY Film Awards of Merit presented annually by the ARY Digital Network and Entertainment Channel to producers working in the film industry and is the only category in which every member is eligible to submit a nomination. Best Film Jury is considered the most important of the ARY Film Awards, as it represents all the directing, acting, music composing, writing, editing and other efforts put forth into a drama. This award is one of the two Best Film awards in ceremony which is awarded to relevant film only on the decision of ceremony Jury, while other being awarded on Viewers Voting's.

== History ==
The best film jury category originates with the 1st ARY Film Awards ceremony since 2014. This category has been given to the best film of previous year to the ceremony held by Jury selection. Since ARY Film Awards has been just started, this category has not a brief history. The name of the category officially termed by the channel is:

- 2013 → present: ARY Film Award for Best Film Jury

== Winners and nominees ==
For Best Film Jury there were no Nomination made as of first ceremony, Since this Category awarded to Best Film of the Year by Jury, so it has to be only one win and one nominee. Following years may have nominations but as per of first ceremony only solo win and solo nomination was being made. The year shown is the one in which the film first released; normally this is also the year before the ceremony at which the award is given; for example, a film exhibited theatrically during 2005 was eligible for consideration for the 2005 Best Film ARY Awards, awarded in 2006. The number of the ceremony (1st, 2nd, etc.) appears in parentheses after the awards year, linked to the article on that ceremony/ Each individual entry shows the title followed by the production company, and the producer. Till from 2013, the Best Drama Serial award has given to producer rather than to Production company.

As of the first ceremony, only one winner was announced during the ceremony which was Jury decision based winner. This category is among four Jury Awards in ARY Film Awards that has only one win and one nomination.

For the first ceremony, the eligibility period spanned full calendar years. For example, the 1st ARY Film Awards presented on May 35, 2015, to recognized films that were released between January, 2013, and December, 2013, the period of eligibility is the full previous calendar year from 1 January to 31 December.

Date and the award ceremony shows that the 2010 is the period from 2010-2020 (10 years-decade), while the year above winners and nominees shows that the film year in which they were releases, and the figure in bracket shows the ceremony number, for example; an award ceremony is held for the films of its previous year.

=== 2010s ===
Year	Film	Director	Production company(s)	Producer(s)	Reference
2014 (1st)	Zinda Bhaag	Meenu Gaur, Farjad Nabi	Matteela Films	Mazhar Zaidi	
2016 (2nd)	Jawani Phir Nahi Ani	Nadeem Beyg	Six Sigma Plus	Salman Iqbal, Humayun Saeed, Shehzad Nasib, Jarjees Seja	
