= Hassan Rana =

Pakistani film director, producer and screenwriter

- Born: Hassan Waqas Rana
- Other name: Doc
- Occupation: Filmmaking
- Years active: 2013–present
- Notable work: Yalghaar

Hassan Rana, also known as Doc, is a Pakistani film director, producer and screenwriter. He is best known for his debut production Waar, for which he won 3 awards at 1st ARY Film Awards. He is the founder of MindWorks Media.

== Filmography ==
Year	Film	Actor	Director	Producer	Writer	Role	Notes
2013	Waar	Yes	No	Yes	Yes	Taha Ali, director CTG	debut production
2017	Yalghaar	Yes	Yes	Yes	No	Maj. Gen Hassan	debut direction
TBA	Waar 2 †	Yes	Yes	Yes	Yes	Taha Ali, director CTG	Development hell phase

== Awards and nominations ==
=== ARY Film Awards ===
- 2014: Winner, ARY Film Award for Best Film for Waar
- 2014: Winner, ARY Film Award for Best Action for Waar
- 2014: Winner, ARY Film Award for Best Special Effects for Waar

== Legal issues ==
In 2014, Bilal Lashari, the director of the film Waar, registered an FIR, alleging that Rana had failed to pay him a 25% share of the profits as per their agreement, and had deposited Rs 200 million in revenue from the film into his personal account. According to Lashari, the production budget for the film was Rs 60 million and its return was Rs 250 million. Rana stated that he had paid Lashari Rs 15 million for his work on the film.
