= Meenu Gaur =

London-based British-Indian director and screenwriter

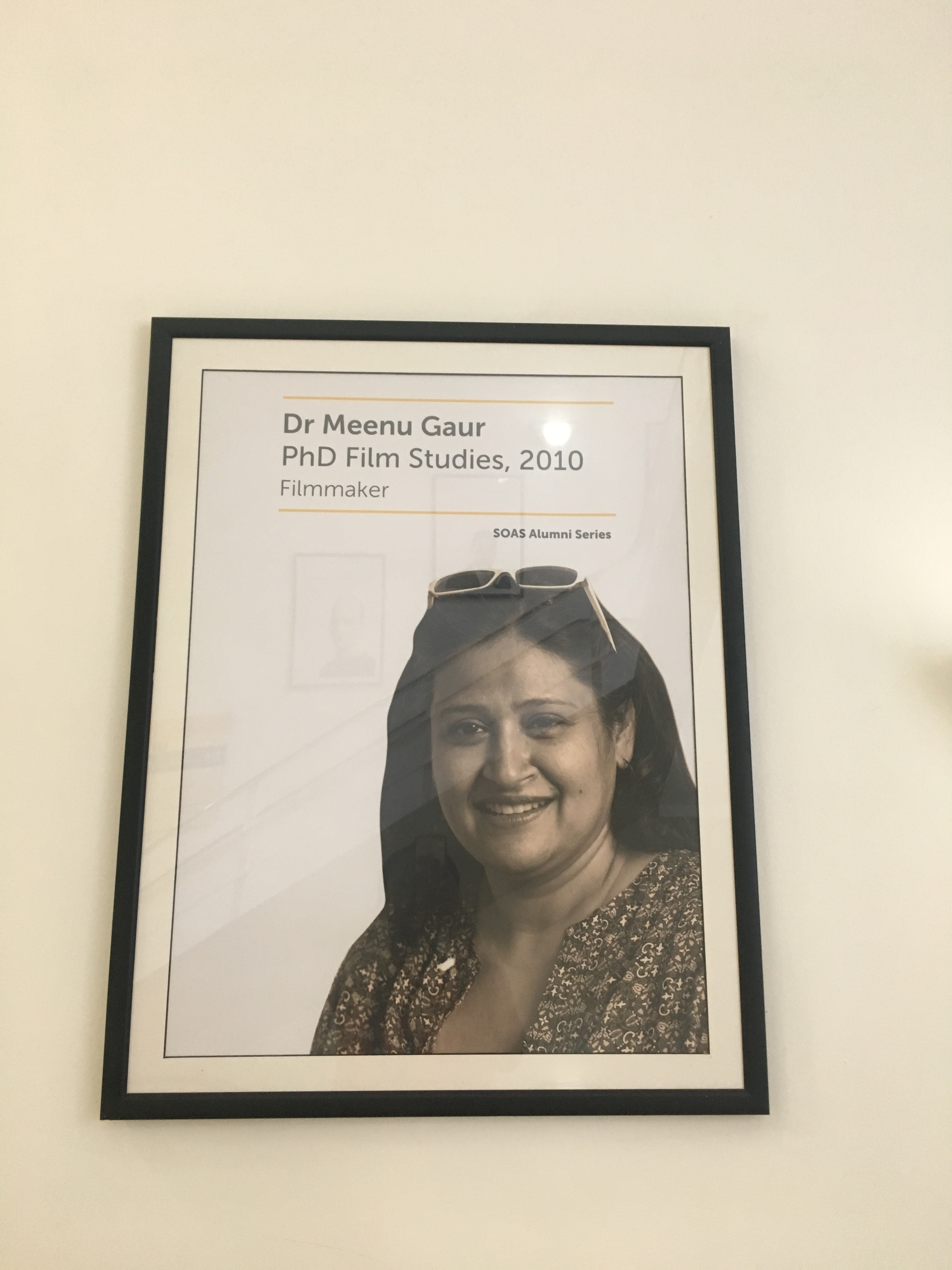
- Gaur, in Alumna Series celebrating notable alumni at SOAS, University of London
- Born: Meenu Gaur; Kolkata, West Bengal, India
- Education: Lady Shri Ram College for Women; Jamia Millia Islamia; PhD, SOAS, University of London
- Occupations: Film Director, screenwriter and film scholar
- Years active: 2007-present
- Notable work: Zinda Bhaag
- Spouse: Mazhar Zaidi

Meenu Gaur is a London-based British-Indian director and screenwriter. She is best known for her 2013 Pakistani film Zinda Bhaag which she co-wrote and co-directed with Farjad Nabi. The film was an entry to the foreign film category at the Oscars. She is presently working on a feature film titled 'Barzakh: Between Heaven and Hell' supported by the Locarno International Film Festival's Open Doors Hub Programme. She has also been part of Berlinale Talents and the NIPKOW film residency in Berlin, supported by Berlinale and Medienboard. Recently, SOAS, University of London installed her portrait on the school walls as part of the Alumni Series that celebrates notable alumni.

== Early life ==
Gaur was born in Kolkata. After finishing her schooling, she moved to Delhi for higher education where she studied at Lady Shri Ram College and the Mass Communication Research Centre, Jamia Millia Islamia.

== Career ==
=== Zinda Bhaag ===
In 2013 Meenu co-directed a Pakistani film Zinda Bhaag, under the film production company Matteela Films. Meenu got immense praise from Pakistani film directors and critics for putting forward Pakistani cinema into limelight again. Zinda Bhaag became one of the highest-grossing of Pakistan and has won many accolades and recognition including an official selection for Best Foreign Language Film at 86th Academy Awards however was out of the competition for the final race. Zinda Bhaag was only the third Pakistani film in 50 years to be submitted at the Oscars, after 1959's The Day Shall Dawn and 1963's The Veil. Zinda Bhaag earned her critical acclaim worldwide and was theatrically released in USA, UAE and Pakistan. It was subsequently released on Netflix in 2015.

=== Qatil Haseenaon Ke Naam ===
Qatil Haseenaon Ke Naam is an Indian and Pakistani crime fiction drama original web series streaming on ZEE5. It is created and directed by British-Indian director Meenu Gaur and written by Farjad Nabi and Meenu Gaur. The series is produced by Hasan Raza Abidi and Shailja Kejriwal. This six episode web series was released on 10 December 2021. It stars Rubya Chaudhry, Sanam Saeed, Sarwat Gilani, Eman Suleman and Faiza Gillani in the lead roles.

=== World on Fire ===
In 2022, Meenu Gaur directed episodes on the second season of BBC's hit drama, World on Fire. The second series aired on BBC One and BBC iPlayer in 2023.

=== Murder is Easy ===
On February 22, 2023 it was announced that she would direct Murder is Easy, based on the classic novel by Agatha Christie. The screenplay was written by Sian Ejiwunmi-Le Berre, produced by Mammoth Screen and Agatha Christie Limited for BBC One and iPlayer, with BritBox International.

=== The Forsytes ===
Gaur directed three out of the six episodes of the 2025 adaptation of The Forsyte Saga, under showrunner and writer Debbie Horsfield and produced by Mammoth Screen for Channel 5 and Masterpiece. She returned to direct three episodes of the second season.

== Filmography and awards ==
Year	Film	Awards
2013	Zinda Bhaag	Won:Jury Award at Festival du Film d’Asie du Sud Transgressif (FFAST) in Paris (shared with Farjad Nabi); Won: ARY Film Award for Best Story (shared with Farjad Nabi); Won: ARY Film Award for Best Film (shared with Farjad Nabi & Mazhar Zaidi); Won: Lux Style Award for Best Director (shared with Farjad Nabi); Won: MISAFF Canada Award for Best Film (shared with Farjad Nabi); Won: Jaipur International Film festival, Special Jury Award (shared with Farjad Nabi)
2022	Qatil Haseenaon Ke Naam	Won:Asian Academy Creative Awards in Singapore
