= Zohaib Asghar =

Pakistani actor

- Born: Lahore, Punjab, Pakistan
- Occupation(s): Film actor, Comedian
- Known for: Zinda Bhaag

Zohaib Asghar (Urdu: زوہیب اصغر) is a Pakistani actor. He rose to prominence after mark his debut in film by playing the role of Tambi in critical and internationally acclaim 2013 Pakistani film Zinda Bhaag, for which he was nominated as Best Actor in a Comic Role at 1st ARY Film Awards.

== Career ==
Zohaib Asghar has no background in acting, prior to showbiz, Asghar was a mobile accessories dealer. He auditioned for film in Lahore auditions, and got selected for one of three lead roles in film alongside Khurram Patras and Salman Ahmed Khan, who were also non-actors prior to auditions.

== Filmography ==
Year	Film	Role	Notes
2013	Zinda Bhaag	Tambi	Nominated: ARY Film Award for Best Actor in a Comic Role.
