= Farjad Nabi =

Pakistani film director (born 1969)

- Born: 1969 (age 56–57); Lahore, Punjab, Pakistan
- Occupations: Film director and documentary film maker
- Years active: 1995–present
- Notable work: Zinda Bhaag; No One Believes the Professor; Nusrat has Left the Building...But When?
- Spouse: Samiya Mumtaz
- Relatives: Emmad Irfani (cousin)

Farjad Nabi (Urdu: فرجاد نبی) is a Pakistani writer, film producer, director, cinematographer and documentary maker. His 2013 feature film Zinda Bhaag, co-written and co-directed with Meenu Gaur, became the first Pakistani film in over fifty years to be submitted for consideration in the 'Foreign Language Film Award’ category at the 86th Academy Awards. He rose to prominence in 1997, when his debut film Nusrat has left the building...But When? won the Second Best Film Award at Film South Asia, Kathmandu. In 1999 his second film No One Believes the Professor won the Best Film Award at the Film South Asia Festival.

== Personal life ==
Farjad was born to Muslim parents in 1969 in Lahore, Pakistan.

== Work and career ==
Nabi is a Lahore-based director who has directed award-winning documentaries including Nusrat has Left the Building… But When? and No One Believes the Professor. He has also documented the work of Lahore film industry's last poster artist in The Final Touch. Nabi has produced and presented a musical documentary on interior Sindh called Aaj ka Beejal for BBCUrdu. Since then he has been recording the dying breed of gallivants (story singers) in the Lahore region. His Punjabi stage plays Annhi Chunni di Tikki (Bread of Chaff & Husk) and Jeebho Jani di Kahani (The Story of Jeebho Jani) has been recently staged and published. He is presently working on a documentary film and monograph along with Meenu Gaur on the Lahore film industry also known as Lollywood.

== Zinda Bhaag ==
In 2013 Farjad co-directed Zinda Bhaag with Meenu Gaur, Under Meenu's husband Mazhar Zaidi's film production Matteela Films which earned him a critical acclaimed and recognition in film world. In an interview he describe the inspiration of film: "When we heard stories shared by friends and family members who had risked everything to do the 'dunky,' we were fascinated by these stories; [however], one question still rankled in us. It was, "Why do men risk their lives to do the 'dunky'?" Our research had dispelled the notion that it is a pure economic question. The truth is there is no one answer. Men do want to change their lives overnight, especially young men who find all legitimate doors closed for them. At the same time, it is almost a tradition which has been followed through generations. further adding he said, "Meenu and I have been collaborating on many projects. We have done documentaries, music videos and scripts together. Right now we have a couple of documentaries we want to finish. One is called The Ghost of Maula Jutt, which is about the rise and decay of Lollywood." Zinda Bhaag became one of the highest-grossing of Pakistan and has won many accolades and recognition including an official selection for Best Foreign Language Film at the 86th Academy Awards however was out of the competition for the final race. Zinda Bhaag was only the third Pakistani film in 50 years to get recognition at the Oscars, after 1959's The Day Shall Dawn and 1963's The Veil.

== Filmography ==
| Year | Film | Notes |
|---|---|---|
| 1997 | Nusrat Has Left the Building... But When? | Director and writer; documentary short Won: Best Documentary at First Kara Film Festival |
| 1999 | No One Believes the Professor | Director and cinematographer; documentary short |
| 1999 | Voices of Dissent: A Dance of Passion | Co-producer; short |
| 2000 | Yeh Hui Na Mardon Wali Baat | Director; documentary short |
| 2000 | Cricket Lives in Lahore | Director; documentary short |
| 2013 | Zinda Bhaag | Co-director and co-writer; first feature film Won: ARY Film Award for Best Story (shared with Meenu Gaur); Nom: ARY Film Award for Best Director (nom with Meenu Gaur) |
| 2016 | Jeewan Hathi | Co-director |
| 2018 | 7 Din Mohabbat In | Co-director |
