= Atrium Cinemas =

- ایٹریئم سینماخانه
- Building of Atrium Mall
- Address: Atrium Cinemas, 3rd Floor, Atrium Mall, 249 Staff Lines, Zaibunnisa Street, Saddar; Karachi; Pakistan
- Owner: Nadeem H. Mandviwalla
- Operator: Mandviwalla Entertainment

Construction
- Opened: 31 December 2010

Website
- atriumcinemas.com.pk

Atrium Cinemas is a cinema, and the first Digital 3D Multi-Screen Cinema Complex in Pakistan inside Atrium Mall Karachi. Cinema was opened on December 31, 2010.
