= Josh (2013 film) =

2012 film by Iram Parveen Bilal

- Theatrical release poster
- Directed by: Iram Parveen Bilal
- Written by: Iram Parveen Bilal
- Screenplay by: Iram Parveen Bilal; Farah Usman
- Produced by: Iram Parveen Bilal; Saad Bin Mujeeb; Kelly Thomas
- Starring: Aamina Sheikh; Khalid Malik; Mohib Mirza; Naveen Waqar; Ali Rizvi; Saleem Mairaj; Adnan Shah Tipu
- Cinematography: Nausheen Dadabhoy
- Edited by: Jochen Kunstler
- Music by: Shahi Hasan; Andrew T. Mackay
- Production companies: Parveen Shah Productions; Twenty Nine Dash One Productions
- Distributed by: ARY Films
- Release dates: October 2012 (Mumbai Film Festival); 10 August 2013 (Pakistan); 20 January 2014 (UK)
- Country: Pakistan
- Languages: Urdu; English
- Box office: Rs. 3.30 crore (US$120,000)

Josh: Independence Through Unity – Against The Grain is a 2013 Pakistani mystery thriller drama film written, directed and produced by Iram Parveen Bilal with co-producers Saad Bin Mujeeb and Kelly Thomas. Film was released at Eid-ul-Fitr in Pakistan and India on 10 August 2013. The film stars Aamina Sheikh, Mohib Mirza, Khalid Malik, Naveen Waqar, Adnan Shah, Kaiser Khan Nizamani, Parveen Akbar, Naila Jaffri, Salim Mairaj, Faizan Haqquee, Ali Rizvi in the ensemble cast.

== Plot ==
Josh is about Fatima (Aamina Sheikh), a dedicated school teacher, who is living a high cosmopolitan life in Karachi until one day her life shatters when her nanny Nusrat-bhi inexplicably disappears. Fatima then takes on the challenge to seek the dangerous truth in Nusrat's feudal village. The themes being tackled are class separation, feudalism, poverty, individual empowerment, and women's rights.

== Cast ==
- Aamina Sheikh as Fatima
- Khalid Malik as Adil
- Mohib Mirza as Uzair
- Naveen Waqar as Ayla
- Faizan Haqquee as Zeeshan
- Khalid Ahmed as Khawaja
- Adnan Shah as Gulsher
- Saleem Mairaj as Master Khalid
- Parveen Akbar as Parveen
- Naila Jaffri as Nusrat Bi
- Ali Rizvi as Ahmed
- Kaiser Khan Nizamani as Khan
- Abdullah Khan as Shera
- Saifullah Sohail as Shakeel
- Haider Salim as Shan

== Release ==
The film world premiered at the Mumbai International Film Festival in October 2012. The film released in Pakistan on 12 August 2013.

== Soundtrack ==
Josh

Soundtrack album by Zoe Viccaji, Devika, Shahi Hasan, Noor Lodhi, Manesh Judge and Ali Azmat
- Released: To Be Released.
- Genre: Film soundtrack
- Producer: Indus World Music

Josh is the soundtrack album of the film.

== Overview and reception ==
All songs are mixed and mastered by Shahi Hasan. The singers include Zoe Viccaji, Devika Chawla, Shahi Hasan, Noor Lodhi, Manesh Judge and Ali Azmat.

== Awards ==
Josh received the 2012 Women in Film Finishing Grant, the 2013 Silent River Film Festival Best First Feature and Best Actress, the 2013 Filmfest Hamburg, Best Political Film Nomination. It also won the Best Screenplay Jury Prize and the Best Feature Film Audience Prize at the Washington, D.C. South Asian Film Festival 2014.

=== Awards ===
Ceremony	Category	Recipient	Result
13th Lux Style Awards	Best Film Actress	Aamina Sheikh	Nominated
4th Pakistan Media Awards	Best Film	Josh	Nominated
4th Pakistan Media Awards	Best Film Director	Iram Parveen Bilal	Nominated
4th Pakistan Media Awards	Best Film Actor	Mohib Mirza	Nominated
4th Pakistan Media Awards	Best Film Actress	Aamina Sheikh	Won
