= Pakistan Media Awards =

Pakistani radio, TV, film and theatre awards

- Awarded for: Excellence in Radio, TV, film and theatre achievements
- Country: Pakistan
- Presented by: Triple E
- First award: 2010
- Website: https://triplee.com.pk/pakistan-media-awards

The Pakistan Media Awards, commonly known as The PMA, These are a set of awards given annually for radio, TV, film, and theatre achievements. The award is a statuette representing a knight with a star on the chest. Its official name is the Pakistan Media Award of Merit.

The awards were founded in 2010 and first given in 2010. PMA focuses on media achievements including all the occupations that come under media. In the television category, awards are awarded in talk shows, news channels, reality programs, dramas, sitcoms, daily soaps, and the fashion industry. Awards also acknowledge the efforts of artists in films, radio, and especially the theatre industry, which the PMA endeavor to revive through this platform.

The 3rd Pakistan Media Awards were held on 30 November 2012 at Expo Centre in Karachi, Sindh. Previously the 4th Pakistan Media Awards were scheduled on 28 December 2013, but due to overwhelming amounts of online votings and persistent requests of voters, the ceremony was rescheduled for 11 January 2014 at the Expo Center, Karachi.

== History ==
The first formal ceremony was held on 7th April 2010 at Karachi. Awards were presented in four categories: TV, Film, Radio and Theatre. According to the organiser and CEO Arshad Siddiqui, the purpose behind the event was to re-live the Pakistani film industry. He said though he and other private sector were trying to play their level best the cold behavior of government was quite illogical.

The 2nd Pakistan Media Awards, held on 7 May 2011 in Karachi. Awards hosts were Faisal Qureshi and Aijaz Aslam. The 3rd Pakistan Media Awards was held on 30 November 2012 in Karachi.

== Award ceremonies ==
Ceremony	Date	Host(s)	Awarded for the cinematic year	Venue
1st Pakistan Media Awards	7 April 2010	Javeria Saud; Sahir Lodhi	2009 in film 2009 in television	Karachi Carlton Hotel
2nd Pakistan Media Awards	7 May 2011	Faisal Qureshi; Aijaz Aslam	2010 in film 2010 in television	Karachi Carlton Hotel
3rd Pakistan Media Awards	30 November 2012	Urooj Nasir; Ahsan Khan	2011 in film 2011 in television	Karachi Expo Centre
4th Pakistan Media Awards	28 December 2013 (previous); 11 January 2014 (current)	Shamoon Abbasi	2012 & 2013 in film 2012 & 2013 television	Karachi Expo Centre

Notes:

1. Due to city fragile and unarmed circumstances, Triple-E on security grounds rescheduled and extend the 3rd award ceremony date.
2. Due to Overwhelming response from the public on online votings for the public poll of selected online nominations, Triple-E shift the date of Ceremony in year 2014, as per the high demand of public to extend the voting days for nominations, but, awards will be awarded for cinematic or media year of 2012.

== See also ==
- List of Asian television awards
- 17th PTV Awards
- 11th Lux Style Awards
- 2012 Nigar Awards
- 1st Hum Awards
