= Siyaah =

2013 film by Azfar Jafri

siyaah
- Theatrical Poster
- Directed by: Azfar Jafri
- Written by: Osman Khalid Butt
- Screenplay by: Azfar Jafri; Osman Khalid Butt
- Produced by: Imran Raza Kazmi
- Starring: Hareem Farooq; Qazi Jabbar; Mahnoor Usman; Ahmed Ali Akbar
- Edited by: Sameer Hamdani; Azfar Jafri
- Music by: Ahmed Ali
- Production company: IRK Films
- Distributed by: Footprint Entertainment
- Release date: 15 March 2013
- Country: Pakistan
- Language: Urdu
- Box office: Rs. 2.65 crore (US$95,000)

Siyaah (Urdu: سیاہ, Black) is a 2013 Pakistani horror thriller film directed by Azfar Jafri and written by Osman Khalid Butt with a screenplay also by Khalid and Jafri. The film stars Hareem Farooq, Qazi Jabbar, Mahnoor Usman and Ahmed Ali Akbar. The film revolves around dissociative identity disorder.

== Plot ==
Zara experiences the loss of her child due to a miscarriage. Following this, Zara and her husband, Bilal, decide to adopt a child. However, the child they adopt turns out to be a ghost. They are left uncertain whether the adopted child has a personality disorder or is, in fact, a ghost.

== Cast ==
- Hareem Farooq as Zara
- Qazi Jabbar Naeem as Bilal
- Mahnoor Usman as Natasha
- Ahmed Ali Akbar as Faadi (Cameo Role)
- Aslam Rana
- Sofia Wanchoo Mir
- Rizwana
- Sarwar Salimi
- Amy Saleh
- Aqeel Abbas (CG)

== Release ==
Film teaser released on 15 June 2012 on YouTube. The film released nationwide on 15 March 2013. Released by Cinepax and Footprint Entertainment, the film is rated U.

== Accolades ==
Ceremony	Category	Recipient	Result
13th Lux Style Awards	Best Film	Siyaah	Nominated
13th Lux Style Awards	Best Film Director	Azfar Jafri	Nominated
13th Lux Style Awards	Best Film Actress	Hareem Farooq	Nominated
13th Lux Style Awards	Best Film Actress	Mahnoor Usman	Nominated
4th Pakistan Media Awards	Best Film Actress	Hareem Farooq	Nominated

== Television series ==
Siyaah Series is a Pakistani horror anthology television series created by Imran Raza and Hareem Farooq for Green Entertainment. Originally premiering on July 15, 2023, series serves as a spin-off/companion series to 2013 film of the same name. The series consists of 25 stories and each have different cast members.

=== Episodes ===
No.	Title	Directed by	Written by	Original release date
1	"Roohdad"	Sabeeh Ahmad	Syed Ameer Hussain Shah	15 July 2023
Wasi Khan earns money by pretending himself as a parapsychologist connecting troubled people with their deceased relatives for a few minutes to solve their unsolved problems. He creates artificial voices of the respective dead persons and answers whatever his clients ask. However, he faces some accidents and the death of his helpers following a case where he accuses the nephew of his client, sitting beside the client at that time, as the murderer of his daughter. The spirit of the nephew returns to avenge his death from Wasi.
2	"Khoat"	Sabeeh Ahmad	Syed Ameer Hussain Shah	15 July 2023
Sarim works as an assistant finance manager in a company and remains mentally disturbed due to Bashir who tortures him every time because Sarim is a coward and weak by heart. He however shares his problems with his neighbour, DSP Yawar whom he visits frequently. One day, Bashir breaks his laptop while in his house and cannot deliver his presentation. His boss insults him to which his colleague Ainne consoles him. He likes Ainne who is a kind person and also liked by Bashir. One day, she is harassed by someone in the office and that evening Sarim finds that person dead in the parking area. He informs the police about the dead body and leaves for his house. On reaching the house, he tells Bashir that he will tell everyone that he has murdered him and replies in a laugh. After days, Sarim learns of Ainne's engagement with Daniyal and informs Bashir who in return informs him about his plan to kill his yet-to-be fiancée Daniyal. Sarim uses this opportunity and helps him in this murder so that they both can be removed from his path as after the murder Bashir will be arrested by the police. Eventually, Daniyal is killed and Sarim is shocked when he sees a video proving that he murdered Daniyal instead of Bashir. He rushes towards the graveyard near his house where he used to sit with DSP Yawar. Additionally, he learns DSP Yawar died years ago. He emerges from the graveyard, walking slowly on the road immersed deep in his thoughts as a helpless person with multiple personality disorder.
3	"Haail"	Zeeshan Ilyas	Syed Ameer Hussain Shah	22 July 2023
4	"Haail"	Zeeshan Ilyas	Syed Ameer Hussain Shah	22 July 2023
5	"Lutrum Putrum"	Zeeshan Ilyas; Sameer Hamdani	Zeeshan Ilyas	5 August 2023
The dominant and horrific behaviour of Nabeel's wife Sidra disturbs him so much. The change comes after her recovery from Corona. He goes to his friend Raja and tells him about his situation. Raja tells him that he also faced the same after her wife Tabinda's recovery from the corona but he then treated her with the help of a doctor and now it's all fine. On Nabeel's demand, he takes him to the same doctor who gives him a syringe of injection, a bangle and a flute for the treatment.
6	"Lutrum Putrum"	Zeeshan Ilyas; Sameer Hamdani	Zeeshan Ilyas	5 August 2023
Further, he says that in case of any mishap the phrase "Lutrum Putrum" can be spoken which will nullify the situation. Nabeel comes to home with these things and somehow manages to inject the injection and wear the bangle. Sidra's behaviour changes, and she starts behaving like a lovely and careful wife. When Raja learns about this transformation, he demands a treat to Nabeel as his life has now become full of happiness. He in return invites him with his wife at dinner in his house. At dinner, when Sidra and Tabinda become close, their bangles spark and Tabinda comes out of the influence of the treatment and becomes normal. Everything begins to remember her and he takes Raja with her to the house. The same happens with Sidra but instead of being normal she starts behaving strangely.
7	"Lutrum Putrum"	Zeeshan Ilyas; Sameer Hamdani	Zeeshan Ilyas	12 August 2023
8	"Raat Andheri"	Sabeeh Ahmad	Tayyab Hussain	13 August 2023
9	"Jhol (Part 1)"	Sabeeh Ahmed	Syed Ameer Hussain Shah	19 August 2023
Iqbal aims to compete in the elections from the constituency and serves the people of the village for the purpose. However, at the council meeting, the party chairman and his father, Jalal announces himself to be the selected candidate for MPA in elections. This infuriates Iqbal and he confronts his father for the decision. On confrontation, Jalal revealed Iqbal's involvement in opium dealing with his reason for not awarding him a ticket to contest the elections. Mazhar, Iqbal's friend and accomplice gives sleeping pills to Iqbal suggesting him to give it to Jalal to keep him unconscious for the next few days meanwhile Iqbal can submit the documents for contesting at the election office. On Mazhar's advice, Rubina (Iqbal's wife) mixes the pills in Jalal's milk given to him at night by Sughra. Rana initiates the investigation at the mansion and receives videos of Iqbal's fight with his father and Mazhar giving sleeping powder to Iqbal as evidence from an unknown number. Rana arrests Iqbal and orders the residents of the mansion to not leave the city until investigation is completed.
10	"Jhol (Part 2)"	Sabeeh Ahmed	Syed Ameer Hussain Shah	20 August 2023
In a flashback, Reshma was revealed to be the fiance of Mazhar but she was abducted by Jalal as he liked her and Mazhar broke up her marriage with Reshma due to Jalal's feudal influence. Reshma then married Jalal. In present day, Rana emphasizes finding the anonymous person who sent the videos and found multiple cameras within the mansion. In one of the bedroom recordings, Reshma upon investigation revealed she had a fight with Jalal the night he died regarding her past and he died right in front of her. The police found Mazhar dead and Iqbal confessed giving pills to Rubina to adulterate milk. However, Jalal's post-mortem reports revealed he died due to over dosage of medications, not due to pills or poison, proving Iqbal and Rubina innocent, leaving behind Suraj as the only suspect living in the mansion with a motive to murder Jalal. In another flashback, Suraj had a fight with Jalal over the throne, business and Iqbal's selection as a candidate. Rana influences Sughra and abet her to give overdosed medications to Jalal. He also influenced Mazhar against Jalal and later abducted and murdered him. Rana realizes that Suraj is the main culprit behind Jalal's murder and takes a vow to put him behind the bars.
11	"Paanch (Part 1)"	Zeeshan Ilyas	Zeeshan Ilyas	26 August 2023
Years ago, Dildar and Kami intrudes into an abandoned girls hostel as Dildar wanted to meet her girlfriend. He enters but becomes possessed by some spirit while Kami waits for him in the hostel's garden. Unconscious Dildar comes back to Kami but soon his body vanishes, scared Kami leaves the premises. In the present day, Pasha, Shaunki and Tehseen were shifted to vacant rooms at the same girl's hostel by DG Khan due to their reckless behavior, unaware that it was an abandoned site. While entering the hostel they were warned by an old man, Jeevan baba about the roaming spirit of Jahan Ara within the hostel premises. He suggested that they stay in their rooms and abstain from going into a specific restricted area. Boys take the precaution as a mythical story and explore the hostel despite the warnings and enter the restricted area.
12	"Paanch (Part 2)"	Zeeshan Ilyas	Zeeshan Ilyas	26 August 2023
Upon entering the restricted area, boys open a girl's room where a register indicates that a girl named Jahan Ara lived there circa 1982. On this assumption they left the place and went back to their rooms. At night, Tehseen experiences paranormal activities and comes across a spirit in the washroom, at first his friends didn't believe him but then agrees to see if Tehseen is scared. On their way to the washroom, they bump into two evil spirits at the stairs and try to escape the hostel however Tehseen is left behind and becomes possessed. Pasha and Shaunki waited for Tehseen outside but he didn't show up. Next day, they comes back looking for Tehseen when they find out that he's been possessed. Possessed Tehseen tries to strangle his friends but they lock him inside a room. Pasha decides to bring back Tehseen with the help of Jee Baba.
13	"Paanch (Part 3)"	Zeeshan Ilyas	Zeeshan Ilyas	2 September 2023
Baba assures them that Tehseen will be fine. Pasha finds the room unlocked in which Tehseen was imprisoned and while looking for him, he met two girls in a room who revealed that they live on the other side of the hostel and were putting up a prank on the boys by scaring them at the stairs. Meanwhile, they were attacked by Tehseen but they managed to tie him to the chair and brought Baba to check on Tehseen. After examining, Baba is angered upon learning that Jahan Ara has been set free by the boys when they unlocked a room in a restricted area. Baba tells them that Jahan Ara was a student living in a hostel who died incidentally as she was heartbroken due to her boyfriend leaving her behind and pursuing his dreams, contemplating suicidal thoughts. Since she died, absurd events have occurred within the hostel but eventually she was imprisoned by an exorcist, Qurban in her own hostel room. Qurban goes to the hostel as soon as he senses that Jahan Ara has been set free and plans to get rid of her spirit with the help of the students.
14	"Paanch (Part 4)"	Zeeshan Ilyas	Zeeshan Ilyas	3 September 2023
Qurban tries multiple ways to trap Jahan Ara but fails. He is attacked by her and leaves the hostel as he feels spirit has become powerful and stronger. Mona and Shaunki become the victim of the spirit and become trapped in a room along with Tehseen. Baba revealed to Pasha and Alisha that DG Khan is actually the love interest of Jahan Ara who left her. They kidnap DG and expose him to the spirit to take her revenge. Betrayed Jahan Ara denies to reconcile her differences and warns to kill everyone. DG tries to escape the hostel but was prompted by the Jahan Ara. While Jahan Ara was having a conversation with DG, Pasha pushed her out of the hostel gate, vanishing her spirit. Tehseen, Shaunki, Mona becomes unpossessed. Pasha and Alisha confesses their feelings for each other. While leaving for his home, DG was frightened by Jahan Ara as he find her at the back seat of his car.
15	"Mask Man"	Sabeeh Ahmed	Hammad Hassan	9 September 2023
After coming from work, Sara notices a maskman with a knife in his hand threatening to kill her standing outside her house. She panicked meanwhile her best friend Aima arrives at her place. Both of them tries to stay safe however maskman attacks Sara but she manages to stab him. As soon as she killed him, another maskman tries to attack her with a chopper who was revealed to be Aima. She hired a maskman to kill Sara but he failed. She was seeking revenge on Sara for breaking up with his brother who committed suicide since he loved Sara. Aima attacks Sara but got her throat slit by Sara. In a closing scene, Sara looks at her brother's portrait saying she avenged his death.
16	"Chandra Maee"	Sabeeh Ahmed	Hammad Hasan	10 September 2023
17	"Do Anjane"	Sabeeh Ahmed	Syed Ameer Hussain Shah	16 September 2023
18	"Do Anjane"	Sabeeh Ahmed	Syed Ameer Hussain Shah	17 September 2023
19	"Unko Chutti Na Milli"	Zeeshan Ilyas	Zeeshan Ilyas	23 September 2023
20	"Unko Chutti Na Milli"	Zeeshan Ilyas	Zeeshan Ilyas	24 September 2023
21	"Karsaz (Part 1)"	Zeeshan Ilyas	Saadia Zahid	30 September 2023
22	"Karsaz (Part 2)"	Zeeshan Ilyas	Saadia Zahid	1 October 2023
23	"Karsaz (Part 3)"	Zeeshan Ilyas	Saadia Zahid	7 October 2023
24	"Karsaz (Part 4)"	Zeeshan Ilyas	Saadia Zahid	8 October 2023
25	"Iqbal-e-Jurm (Part 1)"	Zeeshan Ilyas	Zeeshan Ilyas	15 October 2023
26	"Iqbal-e-Jurm (Part 2)"	Zeeshan Ilyas	Zeeshan Ilyas	21 October 2023
27	"Bhayanak"	Sabeeh Ahmed	Syed Ameer Hussain Shah	22 October 2023
28	"Bahar Bano (Part 1)"	Sabeeh Ahmed	Syed Ameer Hussain Shah	28 October 2023
On the way to their honeymoon spot, Salman and Hania are warned by a man Zulfiqar not to go ahead however they ignore his warning. After covering certain distance, their vehicle engine stops. They took a shelter in a nearby resort over night owned by Jamal where Hania witnesses spirits of three young girls, haunting her. She asks Salman to leave the resort but he doesn't believe considering it her delusions. Due to repeatedly weird incidents, Hania insists Salman to leave the place. Jamal eavesdrop their conversation and ask them to stay at his brother's place in a nearby vicinity to the resort. The couple leaves the resort but are separated in a dark jungle. Salman wanders around the jungle looking for Hania. He eventually found her but she was tied to chains in possession of a spirit, Bahar Bano.
29	"Bahar Bano (Part 2)"	Sabeen Ahmed	Syed Ameer Hussain Shah	29 October 2023
30	"Nangay Pair (Part 1)"	Sabeeh Ahmed	Zeeshan Ilyas	4 November 2023
Haris, a houseboy works at a married couple, Maya and Rohail's house. Ammar (Maya and Rohail's son) and Haris are fond of each other. Haris being an asthma patient often becomes sick and have asthma attacks. Maya's cruel and reckless behavior towards Haris kills him one day as he struggles with asthma attack. Maya asks Rohail to help her with the body and he agrees. They buried him in their lawn area and filed a case accusing Haris of committing a theft and told his parents he have run away with their belongings. Rohail leaves Maya for office meetings while she struggles with her mental state. Ammar, unaware Haris has died, talk to him over walkie talkie and Haris responds by squishing a toy, indicating his presence within the house.
31	"Nangay Pair (Part 2)"	Sabeeh Ahmed	Zeeshan Ilyas	5 November 2023
Ammar becomes possessed by Haris's spirit and he starts behaving like Haris. Guilty Maya watches over him and her mental health deteriorates. She insists Rohail to comes back and locks Ammar in Haris's quarter. Rohail comes home to find Maya in mentally unstable condition and rescues Ammar. However, he witness the Haris's spirit in Ammar's body as Maya did. Rohail seeks help from a sorcerer on a friend's suggestion. Sorcerer examines Ammar's behavior and asks Rohail to reveal the truth regarding Haris's death and his burial in the house in order to free Ammar from the possession. Rohail under police supervision admits the crime while Haris's parents mourn his death. Few weeks later, Ammar cheerfully settles with Haris's parents.
32	"Ghaat (Part 1)"	Sabeeh Ahmed	Zeeshan Ilyas	11 November 2023
33	"Ghaat (Part 2)"	Sabeeh Ahmed	Zeeshan Ilyas	12 November 2023
34	"Laawaris (Part 1)"	Sabeeh Ahmed	Zeeshan Ilyas	18 November 2023
35	"Laawaris (Part 2)"	Sabeeh Ahmed	Zeeshan Ilyas	19 November 2023
36	"Bar Aks (Part 1)"	Zeeshan Ilyas	Zeeshan Ilyas	25 November 2023
37	"Bar Aks (Part 2)"	Zeeshan Ilyas	Zeeshan Ilyas	26 November 2023
38	"Bar Aks (Part 3)"	Zeeshan Ilyas	Zeeshan Ilyas	2 December 2023
39	"Bar Aks (Part 4)"	Zeeshan Ilyas	Zeeshan Ilyas	3 December 2023
