= Manto (2015 film) =

2015 Pakistani biographical drama film

- Theatrical release poster
- Directed by: Sarmad Khoosat
- Screenplay by: Shahid Nadeem
- Based on: Manto's Autobiography by Saadat Hassan Manto
- Produced by: Babar Javed
- Starring: Sarmad Khoosat; Sania Saeed; Saba Qamar; Hina Khawaja Bayat; Nimra Bucha; Talha Mufti
- Cinematography: Khizer Idrees
- Edited by: Kashif Nawazish Kashif; Sarmad Khoosat
- Music by: Jamal Rahman
- Production companies: A & B Entertainment
- Distributed by: Geo Films
- Release date: 11 September 2015
- Running time: 127 minutes
- Country: Pakistan
- Language: Urdu
- Box office: Rs. 50.5 million (US$180,000)

Manto (Urdu: منٹو) is a 2015 Pakistani biographical drama film based on the life of Pakistani short-story writer Saadat Hassan Manto, starring Sarmad Khoosat in the title role. It was directed by Khoosat himself, produced by Babar Javed, and written by Shahid Nadeem, whose screenplay was adapted from Manto's short stories, particularly "Thanda Gosht", "Madari", "License", "Hatak" and "Peshawar Se Lahore". It also depicts his relationship with singer-actress Noor Jehan. The film was released on 11 September 2015, sixty years after Manto's death.

The full-length official trailer was released on 29 August 2015. The motion trailer, along with film music, was released on 6 August 2015. The TV series on the life of the writer, titled Main Manto with the same cast and production, initially made in 2012, was aired in December 2015.

== Plot ==
The story is about a 20th-century writer, Manto (played by Sarmad Khoosat), who grew up in the showbiz industry of Bombay (now Mumbai) and Lahore. It focuses on the last seven years of the writer's life, during which he wrote some of his most controversial stories, such as "Thanda Gosht", "Toba Tek Singh", "License", "Upar, Neechay aur Darmiyan" and "Peshawar Se Lahore". For these, Manto had to face charges of obscenity thrice.

== Cast ==
- Sarmad Khoosat as Saadat Hasan Manto
- Sania Saeed as Safiya Manto
- Saba Qamar as Noor Jehan
- Danyal Adam Khan as Hamid Jalal
- Adnan Jaffar as Qudrat Ullah Shahab
- Shamoon Abbasi as Eishar Singh
- Aliee Shaikh as Khuda Bakash
- Tipu Sharif as Shaukat Hussain Rizvi
- Talha Mufti as Nawaz
- Arjumand Rahim as Nazneen (a Tawaif)
- Hina Khawaja Bayat as Begum Sahiba
- Rehan Sheikh as Mian Saheb
- Faisal Qureshi as Radio Actor
- Mizna Waqas as Minal
- Nadia Afghan as Saugandhi
- Savera Nadeem
- Nimra Bucha
- Irfan Khoosat
- Afraz Rasool
- Shakeel Hussain Khan as Manto's Doctor
- Yasra Rizvi as Balwant Kaur
- Qaiser Naqvi as Sardar Begum
- Mahira Khan as Madaran (appeared in screen credits and in the song "Kya Hoga")
- Azfar Rehman as a Passenger (appeared in screen credits and in the song "Kya Hoga")
- Humayun Saeed (cameo appearance in screen credits)
- Mohammed Hanif (guest appearance)
- Suhaee Abro (appearance in the song "Kaun Hai Ye Gustakh" in an opening scene)
- Vajdan Shah (appearance in the song "Kaun Hai Ye Gustakh" in an opening scene)

== Soundtrack ==
The music album was released on 6 August 2015, at a Blue Carpet event held at Nueplex Cinema, Karachi by distributors Geo Entertainment and Geo Films. The soundtrack, including background score, sound mixing, editing and original songs, was composed by Jamal Rahman of True Brew Records. Khoosat, who hired Rahman after hearing his work for Mira Nair's The Reluctant Fundamentalist, said, "I want to make it yours and run with it." Three of the four songs are taken from famous poets, including Majeed Amjad, Mirza Ghalib and Indian Punjabi poet Shiv Kumar Batalvi. One song was written by Muhammad Hanif. One song of the film, sung by Ustad Salamt Ali Nazar, was neither revealed nor announced at the launch. The soundtrack was praised for its classical genre, strong lyrics and soulful music composition.

=== Track listing ===
| No. | Title | Lyrics | Singer(s) | Length |
|---|---|---|---|---|
| 1. | "Kaun Hai Yeh Gustakh" | Majeed Amjad | Javed Bashir | 2:46 |
| 2. | "Aah Ko Chahiye" | Mirza Ghalib | Ali Sethi | 4:12 |
| 3. | "Kya Hoga" | Muhammad Hanif | Zeb Bangash, Ali Sethi | 3:44 |
| 4. | "Mehram Dilaan De Mahi" | Shiv Kumar Batalvi | Meesha Shafi | 3:54 |

== Release ==
Initially the film was scheduled to release in late 2014 but was postponed due to delays in post-production. The first teaser trailer was released on 6 August 2015, for a limited special screening. The official trailer was released online on 29 August 2015. Manto was released on 11 September 2015 in Pakistan under the banners of Geo Films. Before theatrical release in the US, the film was screened at three of eight Ivy League institutions, including Harvard University, Columbia University, Yale University and the University of California, Berkeley between 16 and 25 October.

== Reception ==
=== Box office ===
Below is the film's Weekly breakdown..

Week One.. 1.58cr

Week Two.. 1.77cr

Week Three.. 67lacs

Week Four + Week Five.. 57lacs

Week Six.. 20lacs

Week Seven*.. 11lacs

Week Eight Onward.. 15lacs

Total.. 5.03cr

=== Critical reception ===
The film has been positively received by critics, with Dawn's Mehreen Hasan calling it "A darkly perfect biopic". Blasting News' Adnan Murad stated, "With an interestingly intricate premise, 'Manto' depicts the life of an accomplished writer of the subcontinent. The movie clearly rests on the shoulders of supremely talented Sarmad, who eloquently plays Manto." Galaxy Lollywood gave it 4.4 out of 5 stars, calling it "As big of a must watch for every Pakistani as perhaps Jamil Dehlavi's Jinnah was."

== Accolades ==
| Ceremony | Won | Nominated |
|---|---|---|
| 15th Lux Style Awards | | Babar Javed – Best Film; Sarmad Sultan Khoosat – Best Director; Sarmad Sultan Khoosat – Best Actor; Sania Saeed – Best Actress; Nimra Bucha – Best Supporting Actress; Ali Sethi – Best Male Singer for "Ah Ko Chaheye"; Zebunnisa Bangash – Best Female Singer for "Kya Hoga" |
| 2nd Galaxy Lollywood Awards | Sarmad Sultan Khoosat – Best Actor in a Leading Role Male; Saba Qamar – Best Actor in a Supporting Role Female | Babar Javed – Best Film; Sarmad Sultan Khoosat – Best Director; Sania Saeed – Best Actor in a Supporting Role Female; Shaz Khan – Best Male Debut; Ali Sethi – Best Playback Singer Male for "Ah Ko Chaheye"; Meesha Shafi – Best Playback Singer Female for "Mehram"; Jamal Rehman – Best Music; Mehram Dile Da Mahi – Song of the Year; Faisal Qureishi Scene – Cinematic Moment of the Year |
| 2nd ARY Film Awards | Sarmad Sultan Khoosat – Best Actor Jury; Sania Saeed – Best Actress Jury | Babar Javed – Best Film; Sarmad Sultan Khoosat – Best Director; Sarmad Sultan Khoosat – Best Actor; Sania Saeed – Best Actress; Saba Qamar – Best Supporting Actress; Akbar Subhani – Best Actor in a Negative Role; Ali Sethi – Best Male Playback Singer for "Ah Ko Chaheye"; Meesha Shafi – Best Female Playback Singer for "Mehram Dile Da Mahi" |

| Ceremony | Won |
|---|---|
| Jaipur International Film Festival | Sarmad Sultan Khoosat – Best Actor; – Best Sound; – Best Editing |

== TV series ==
In 2012, before developing the film, a TV series based on the life and literary work of Saadat Hassan Manto, titled Main Manto, was made. It had a total of 20 episodes and was made with the same cast and production as the film. Both the film and the television series were directed by Sarmad Khoosat, who also played the title character. Playwright Shahid Nadeem served as a screenwriter and Babar Javed produced the serial and film under A & B Entertainment at Geo Films. The series was scheduled to be released in 2012, but was put on hold due to the film production. Later it aired in November 2017 on Geo Entertainment with 18 episodes.

== See also ==
- Manto, Indian biographical film of the writer
- List of Pakistani films of 2015
- List of highest-grossing Pakistani films
