= Main Hoon Shahid Afridi =

2013 film by Syed Ali Raza Usama

- Theatrical release poster
- Directed by: Syed Ali Raza Usama
- Written by: Vasay Chaudhry
- Produced by: Humayun Saeed; Shahzad Nasib
- Starring: Humayun Saeed; Noman Habib; Ismail Tara; Nadeem Baig; Javed Sheikh; Shehzad Sheikh; Hamza Ali Abbasi; Mahnoor Baloch; Gohar Rasheed; Summer Nicks; Ayesha Omer; Mathira; Saife Hassan
- Cinematography: Asif Khan
- Edited by: Asad Ali Zaidi
- Music by: Shani & Kami
- Production company: Six Sigma Plus
- Distributed by: ARY Films; Mandviwalla Entertainment
- Release date: 23 August 2013 (Pakistan)
- Running time: 130 minutes
- Country: Pakistan
- Languages: Urdu; Punjabi
- Budget: Rs. 35 million (US$130,000)
- Box office: Rs. 52 million (US$190,000)

Main Hoon Shahid Afridi (Urdu: میں ہوں شاہد آفریدی, romanized: I Am Shahid Afridi) is a 2013 Pakistani sports film directed by Syed Ali Raza Usama and produced by Humayun Saeed and Shahzad Nasib. The film features Humayun Saeed, Javed Shaikh and Noman Habib in the lead roles. Nadeem Baig, Shafqat Cheema, Ismail Tara, Ainy Jaffri, Hamza Ali Abbasi and Shehzad Sheikh also play important roles in the film, whilst the cricketer Shahid Afridi is also in the movie.

== Plot ==
Akbar Deen is a cricketer, who is the pride and joy of his family that includes a sweet mother, a disciplined father, a loving wife Zara and son, Mikaal. It is apparent from the beginning that Zara's father Mian Asif Qureshi hates Akbar. Akbar is implicated in an illegal drugs case after he gets drunk after consuming what he believed was plain orange juice during a dance item by Mathira in Dubai. Akbar is imprisoned for a crime which he did not commit and his cricket career is jeopardized.

Years later, Shahid, a youngster from Sialkot (where Akbar Deen lived), who works the cash register at a local restaurant, pushes the owner of his local cricket club, Malik Khalid to try a team for a Pepsi-sponsored tournament. Shahid is passionate about cricket and just has one dream – to meet his inspiration and cricket idol Shahid Afridi in person one day.

Akbar is back in Sialkot after solving his past puzzles and is persuaded to become the coach of this team which he later renames Sialkot Shaheens. However, he doesn't mention anything to them about his past endeavour. Akbar also learns that his son Mikal is the captain of a rival team, Islamabad Hunters. Sialkot Shaheens play and lose their first match against Islamabad Hunters. After the match, Malik becomes angry, Akbar tells them that they should not always rely on Shahid to win the match because a match is won by the whole team and not just one man. Meanwhile, Mikal reveals everything to the social media about Akbar being his father and also his dark past. Akbar confronts Asif Qureshi over this and is told by Asif that his team will not be able to compete in this tournament. Sialkot wins all their next matches to qualify for the final against Islamabad Hunters. During a press conference, Mikal and Shahid start fighting each other. Asif Qureshi tells his men to injure any one member of Sialkot team. They choose to target the wicketkeeper Michael. Zara overhears his conversation and also learns Akbar being implicated with drugs was a plan of her father. She tells everything to Akbar.

Asif Qureshi's men attack Michael but Akbar saves him and takes him to hospital despite not being 100 percent fit he insists coach to let him play final match. Akbar's father also learns the truth and forgives him. Before the start of the match, the coach of Islamabad Hunters gives drugs to a fast bowler. Sialkot needed to chase 203 runs in 20 overs to win the tournament. In the end, 6 runs were required on the last ball Mikal delivered a short ball which Shahid hooked for six taking his team home. Right after the match, Akbar reunites with Mikal and Zara. In the end, Shahid Afridi appears and tells Shahid that it doesn't matter how many matches he plays for Pakistan but he should play as Shahid and not think of himself as Shahid Afridi.

== Cast ==
- Humayun Saeed as Akbar is the coach of a team of misfits, Sialkot Shaheens. He is determined and keen that his team wins the Under 19 national Pepsi cup but his dark past keeps coming his way to haunt him and stop him.
- Noman Habib as Shahid Bhatti, a boy who dreams to become Shahid Afridi, does not know the price he has to pay to achieve the ultimate goal he has ever lived for.
- Nadeem Baig as Imam Deen is a man living an abandoned life to evade everyone around him who reminds him of his ugly past he once faced because of his son Akbar Deen (Hanaan-ul-Haque).
- Javed Shaikh as Mian Asif Qureshi – Courage is the only word in his dictionary.
- Shehzad Sheikh as Mikaal Qureshi is a young handsome man and the Captain of Islamabad Hunters with an unconquered winning streak.
- Hamza Ali Abbasi as Maulvi Majeed is a fast bowler of Sialkot Shaheens and is slightly racist and short-tempered by nature.
- Mahnoor Baloch as Sara is now a woman of few words now left with a broken heart, looking for answers from people around her.
- Shafqat Cheema as Bashir Bhatti, a person who lived his life in gambling and denying every bond he has towards his family including his wife, his daughter and his dreamer son (Shahid Bhatti).
- Ismail Tara as Malick Khalid would risk everything including his wife's bangles and motorbike to save the last remaining asset he inherited from his forefathers, Malick Cricket Club.
- Gohar Rasheed as Kashif also known as Kaali Aandhi is a blazingly fast bowler with an unbeatable speed.
- Ainan Arif as Micheal Magnet – The backbone of the team and irreplaceable keeper who draws any ball in his gloves like a magnet, a Christian in the team
- Asim Mehmood as Shiekh also known as Deeware Teen is the opening batsman of the team who would stand like an iron wall between the opponent's ball and his wickets.
- Summer Nicks as Thomas J. Nicks, a ruthless Australian coach hired specially to train Islamabad Hunters to turn them into a coldblooded invincible team.
- Saife Hassan as Doctor
- Shahid Afridi, special appearance in the end
- Muhammad Asif Iqbal, special appearance as Sallu Bhai
- Uzain Saeed, As A ChildHood Of Mikaal Who Was The Captain Of Islamabad Hunters
- Aijaz Aslam, As Akbar's friend (special appearance)

== Soundtrack ==
The soundtrack consists of five songs, penned and composed by the duo Shani-Kami.

Tracklist
No.	Title	Singer(s)	Length
1.	"Jera Vi Hai Aanday"	Shafqat Amanat Ali Khan	3:48
2.	"Malal"	Rahat Fateh Ali Khan	4:16
3.	"Angreja Teri"	Momin Durrani, Jabar Abbas	1:35
4.	"Masti Mein Doobi"	Neeti Wagh, Shani	5:47
5.	"Teri Hi Kami"	Shani & Kami	4:50
Total length:			20:16

== Development ==
They offered me the role but my elders didn't let me act, but I happily gave them permission to use my name as this film will bring a positive message."

— Shahid Afridi cricketer

The film's writer and host of the night Vasay Chaudhry elaborated on the kind of cinema actor-producer Humayun Saeed and his team support. "Song, dance and drama is the style of cinema that we believe in," said Chaudhry. "From 1947 to 2001, more than 4,300 films were released in Pakistan with dances, songs and drama. This is as much our style of cinema as it is our neighbour’s."

After Chaudhry's brief on the film, film distributor Nadeem Mandviwalla shared his views. "On all such jubilant occasions, we should never forget to pay tribute to and thank people like Nadeem Baig and Javed Sheikh who have seen the industry go through thick-and-thin and have been resilient," said Mandviwalla. According to Mandviwalla, Main Hoon Shahid Afridi is expected to do a great job at the local box office. Like every cricket-loving citizen of Pakistan, Saeed also expressed his love for Shahid Afridi and how this film is a tribute to him. "I would have easily made a shaadi biyaah type of a film, but I always wanted to pay tribute to one of our own Pakistani stars in their lifetime," said Saeed."Whether he performs or not, Shahid Afridi will continue to be Shahid Afridi for us," said Saeed. He then thanked all the cast and crew for their continuous support and hard work but failed to mention Mathira, who performed an item number in the film. She walked out of the conference in protest. Main Hoon Shahid Afridi also features Javed Sheikh, Nadeem Baig, Shafqat Cheema, Humayun Saeed, Mahnoor Baloch and Noman Habib, who plays the lead role.

Shahzad Nasib, who invested $1 million into the film said, Humayun initially had asked the legendary cricketer himself to act in the lead role. "They offered me the role but my elders didn't let me act, but I happily gave them permission to use my name as this film will bring a positive message," Shahid Afridi later told AFP.Veteran actor Javed Sheikh talked about his experience in contributing to the new age of Pakistani cinema. "I must assure you that Humayun Saeed and his team will bring you a pleasant surprise on the first day of Eid," said Sheikh, who also believes that if Pakistani dramas can beat Indian dramas, then Pakistani films can also beat Indian films. "The new wave of Pakistani cinema will come from Karachi and the new film-makers will make better films than India in much more limited circumstances," he added.

Senior actor Shafqat Cheema, in his signature aggressive style, explained his character, which is significantly different from the one in Bol. Being one of the most senior cast members, Nadeem Baig said he is hopeful of the new Pakistani cinema, while he grieved over artists going to Bollywood. "There is nothing bad about going to Bollywood, but not at the cost of your own cinema," said Baig. "Respect your soil and culture because it’s a part of you and you are a part of it."Director Syed Ali Raza had a more proactive approach towards the new wave of Pakistani cinema. "We are not here to compete but to walk hand-in-hand with our neighbours, for the cause of entertainment," he said. "Whether you win or lose doesn't matter, but play with such a spirit that you can look into each other’s eyes after the game," said Raza, using one of the lines from the film. The evening ended with the unveiling of some very catchy songs from the film after which we can easily say that the audience is definitely in for some good surprises.

== Release ==
The film premiered on 22 August 2013 at Atrium Cinemas in Karachi. It released on 23 August 2013.

== Reception ==
=== Box office ===
Main Hoon Shahid Afridi earned Rs. 22 million (US$79,000) in its first week of release. Film saw falls from Week Two onward and collected Rs. 5.2 crore (US$190,000) in its Lifetime run and got a verdict of Average.

=== Critical reception ===
Mohammad Kamran Jawaid of DAWN praised the performances of Saeed and Habib and wrote, "The film is family friendly – given that one shields the young-one’s eyes when Mathira belly-dances like an Arab slave-girl". Mahwash Badar of The Express Tribune rated it 5 stars out of 5 and said "Bravo to the director for knowing the people who will be watching the movie and playing to their emotions, needs and level of understanding; goes to show you that a movie doesn’t have to be a social revolution, sometimes it just has to be a movie", "The dialogue was strong, overall acting deserves a round of applause."

== Accolades ==
Ceremony	Category	Recipient	Result
13th Lux Style Awards	Best Film	Main Hoon Shahid Afridi	Nominated
13th Lux Style Awards	Best Film Director	Syed Ali Raza Usama	Nominated
13th Lux Style Awards	Best Film Actor	Humayun Saeed	Nominated
13th Lux Style Awards	Best Original Soundtrack	Humayun Saeed & Shahzad Naseeb	Won
13th Lux Style Awards	Best Song of the Year	'Malal' by Rahat Fateh Ali Khan	Won
4th Pakistan Media Awards	Best Film	Main Hoon Shahid Afridi	Won
4th Pakistan Media Awards	Best Film Director	Syed Ali Raza Usama	Won
4th Pakistan Media Awards	Best Film Actor	Humayun Saeed	Nominated
4th Pakistan Media Awards	Best Film Actress	Mahnoor Baloch	Nominated
1st ARY Film Awards	Best Actor (Jury's Choice)	Humayun Saeed	Won
1st ARY Film Awards	Best Star Debut Male (Viewer's Choice)	Hamza Ali Abbasi	Won
1st ARY Film Awards	Best Music	Shani & Kami	Won
1st ARY Film Awards	Best Actor in a Comic Role	Ismail Tara	Won
1st ARY Film Awards	Best Choreography	Pappu Samrat	Won
1st ARY Film Awards	Best Dialogue	Vasay Chaudhry	Won
1st ARY Film Awards	Best Makeup and Hairstyling	Nabila	Won
1st ARY Film Awards	Best Supporting Actor	Noman Habib	Nominated
1st ARY Film Awards	Best Star Debut Male	Noman Habib	Nominated
2nd Hum Awards	Hum Honorary Special recognition	Humayun Saeed	Won

== See also ==
- List of Pakistani films of 2013
- Cricket in film and television
