= List of Pakistani films of 2013 =

This is a list of Pakistani films released in 2013. Waar was the all time grossing pakistani film released on EidulAzha this year, replaced by Jawani Phir Nahi Ani released on EidulAzha 2015.

== Top Grossing Films ==
The top 10 films released in 2013 by worldwide gross are as follows:

Highest-grossing films of 2013
Rank	Title	Studio	Gross	Ref.
1.	Waar	MindWorks Media	Rs. 34.65 crore (US$1.2 million)	
2.	Zama Arman	Liaqat films	Rs. 6.00 crore (US$210,000) (not confirmed)	
3.	Main Hoon Shahid Afridi	Six Sigma Entertainment	Rs. 5.20 crore (US$190,000)	
4.	Josh	Parveen Shah Productions/Twenty Nine Dash One Productions	Rs. 3.30 crore (US$120,000)	
5.	Seedlings	Bodhicitta Works Production	Rs. 3.10 crore (US$110,000)	
6.	Siyaah	IRK Films	Rs. 2.65 crore (US$95,000)	
7.	Ishq Khuda	Sound View Production	Rs. 2.40 crore (US$86,000)	
8.	Chambaili	7th Sky Entertainment	Rs. 2.00 crore (US$72,000)	
9.	Zinda Bhaag	Matteela Films	Rs. 2.00 crore (US$72,000)	
10.	Anjuman	Mastermind	Rs. 1.90 crore (US$68,000)	

== Scheduled Releases ==
=== January - March ===
Opening		Title	Genre	Director	Cast	Ref.
F E B	1	Bodyguard	Action/Drama	Arshad Khan	Dua Qureshi, Jahangir Khan, Dilbar Munir, Mohammad Hussain Swati	
F E B	15	Inteha	Action/Drama	Arbaz Khan	Arbaz Khan, Sobia Khan, Babrik Shah, Sunbal, Jahangir Jani	

Opening		Title	Genre	Director	Cast	Ref.
M A R	1	Pakhawri Badmash	Action/Drama	Arshad Khan	Arbaaz Khan, Jahangir Khan, Mohammad Hussain Swati, Mahnoor	
M A R	1	Dil Praey Des Mein	Drama/Romance	Hassan Askari	Huma Ali, Sami Khan, Iftikhar Thakur, Shafqat Cheema, Rashid Mehmood	
M A R	15	Siyaah	Horror, Mystery	Azfar Jafri	Hareem Farooq, Qazi Jabbar, Mahnor Usman, Aslam Rana	
M A R	22	Bhola Ishtehari	Action/Drama	Safdar Hussain	Saima Noor, Shaan, Saima Khan, Shafqat Cheema	
M A R	29	Sher Khan	Action/Drama	Liaqat Ali Khan	Shahid Khan, Asima Lata, Jahangir Khan	

=== April - June ===
Opening		Title	Genre	Director	Cast	Ref.
A P R	19	No Tension	Comedy	Roshan Malik	Khushboo, Nasir Chinyoti, Sardar Kemal	
A P R	19	Mast Malang	Action	Haji Nadir Khan	Shahid Khan, Sobia Khan, Jahangir Khan, Babrik Shah, Imran Khan, Mohammad Swati	
A P R	25	Chamballi	Thriller, Drama	Ismail Jilani	Mehreen Syed, Saiqa, Ghulam Mohiuddin, Shafqat Cheema, Salman Pirzada	

Opening		Title	Genre	Director	Cast	Ref.
M A Y	3	Meri Shadi Kawao	Drama, Comedy	Naseem Haidar Shah	Inayat Anjam, Sakhawat Naz, Ashraf Rahi	
M A Y	17	Mena Kawa Kho 302 Ma Kawa	Comedy, Drama	Arif	Shahid Khan, Dua Qureshi, Jahangir Khan, Babrik Shah, Mohammad Hussain Swati	
M A Y	17	Love Story	Drama, Romance	Arshad Khan	Shahid Khan, Sobia Khan, Dua Qureshi, Jahangir Khan, Shahsawar Khan	

Opening		Title	Genre	Director	Cast	Ref.
J U N	7	Munafiq	Action	Saleem Murad	Arbaz Khan, Sobia Khan, Jahangir Khan	
J U N	22	Sarkar	Action, Drama	Arshad Khan	Shahid Khan, Sobia Khan, Jahangir Khan, Sunbal, Babrik Shah, Priya, Mohammad Hussain Swati, Imran Khan	

=== July - September ===
Opening		Title	Genre	Director	Cast	Ref.
A U G	9	Ishq Khuda	Musical, Romance	Shahzad Rafique	Shaan, Saima Noor, Meera, Ahsan Khan, Wiam Dahmani, Humaima Malick, Shafqat Cheema	
A U G	9	Josh	Mystery, Thriller	Iram Parveen Bilal	Aamina Sheikh, Mohib Mirza, Khalid Malik, Naveen Waqar, Ali Rizvi	
A U G	9	Zama Arman	Romantic	Liaqat Ali Khan	Arbaaz Khan, Sobia Khan, Jahangir Khan Jani, Mohammad Hussain Sawati	
A U G	9	Loafer	Action, Romance	Arshad Khan	Shahid Khan, Virda Khan, Jiya Butt, Jahangir Khan, Babrik Shah,	
A U G	9	Shart	Drama, Action	Liaqat Ali Khan	Arbaz Khan, Sobia Khan, Jahangir Khan and Shah Sawar Khan	
A U G	9	Dirty Girl	Romance	Arshad Khan	Shahid Khan, Haya Ali, Babrik Shah, Nisha Chodhary, Shafqat Cheema	
A U G	9	Qurbani	Drama, Action	Arbaz Khan	Arbaz Khan, Nadia Chodhary, Ajab Gul, Asif Khan, Jahangir Khan	

Opening		Title	Genre	Director	Cast	Ref.
A U G	23	Main Hoon Shahid Afridi	Sports, Drama	Syed Ali Raza	Humayun Saeed, Mahnoor Baloch, Javed Sheikh, Nadeem, Ismail Tara, Hamza Ali Abbasi, Shafqat Cheema, Summer Nicks, Gohar Rasheed Shehzad Sheikh,	

Opening		Title	Genre	Director	Cast	Ref.
S E P	20	Zinda Bhaag	Drama	Meenu Gaur	Amna Ilyas, Naseeruddin Shah, Khurram Patras, Salman Ahmad Khan	
S E P	20	Seedlings	Drama	Mansoor Mujahid	Mohib Mirza, Aamina Sheikh, Gohar Rasheed, Hira Tareen, Tara Mehmood, Mehreen Rafi	

=== October - December ===
Opening		Title	Genre	Director	Cast	Ref.
O C T	16	Waar	Action thriller, Drama	Bilal Lashari	Shaan Shahid, Meesha Shafi, Ali Azmat, Shamoon Abbasi, Ayesha Khan, Hamza Ali Abbasi, Uzma Khan, Batin Farooqi, Kamran Lashari, Bilal Lashari	
O C T	16	LIbaas	Erotic Drama	Shahzad Haider	Ahmed Butt, Madhu, Zafri Ahamd, Zarri Khan, Anjuman Shehzadi	

Opening		Title	Genre	Director	Cast	Ref.
N O V	13	Armaan	Romance, Drama	Anjum Shahzad	Fawad Khan, Aamina Sheikh, Lubna Aslam, Manzoor Qureshi, Mahnoor Khan, Jahanzaib Khan, Vasay Chaudhry	

== See also ==
- 2013 in film
- 2013 in Pakistan
