= 2nd ARY Film Awards =

2016 Pakistani film awards ceremony

- Official poster
- Date: 16 April 2016; 7 May 2016 (televised)
- Site: Madinat Arena; Madinat Jumeirah, Al Sufouh, Dubai, UAE
- Hosted by: Fahad Mustafa; Ahmad Ali Butt; Sana Bucha
- Produced by: Salman Iqbal; Jarjees Seja

Highlights
- Best Film: Jury's choice: Jawani Phir Nahi Ani
- Best Film: Viewers' choice: Jawani Phir Nahi Ani
- Most awards: Jawani Phir Nahi Ani (18)
- Most nominations: Jawani Phir Nahi Ani (29)

Television coverage
- Channel: ARY Digital
- Network: ARY Digital Network

The 2nd ARY Film Awards or AFA'16 ceremony, presented by the ARY Digital Network and Entertainment Channel, sponsored by Tang and L'Oréal, honored the best Pakistani films of 2015 and took place on 16 April 2016, at the Madinat Jumeirah, in Dubai, UAE, beginning at 7:30 UAE Standard Time. The ceremony was held recorded and televised on 7 May 2016. During the ceremony, the ARY Digital Network and Entertainment Channel presented ARY Film Awards (commonly referred to as AFAs) in 28 categories. The ceremony was televised in the Pakistan by ARY Digital, and produced by Salma Iqbal and Jarjees Seja.

Actor Fahad Mustafa was announced to host the show, along with co-hosts Ahmad Ali Butt, Yasir Hussain and Sana Bucha. Mustafa previously co-hosted the first ceremony in 2014. Having been originally scheduled for 18 February, it was rescheduled for 10 March, before changing once again to 16 April 2016, due to severe-weather conditions in UAE.

Jawani Phir Nahi Ani won eighteen awards, the most for the evening, winning all big-five awards including Best Actor for Humayun Saeed, Best Actress for Sohai Ali Abro, Best Screenplay for Vasay Chaudhry, Best Director for Nadeem Baig and Best Film. Other winners includes Moor with four awards, Manto with two awards, and Halla Gulla and Wrong No. with one each.

== Winners and nominees ==
The following twelve categories in Viewers choice nominations were announced and set open for voting on 7 February 2016, originally till 15 February but with the extension of ceremony date voting lines were also extend till 4 March, at ceremony official website and Facebook page that also includes the nominees from all production banners and companies across the Pakistan.

=== Awards ===
Winners are listed first and indicated with a double-dagger. ‡

Jury Choice Categories
Best Film Jury	Best Director Jury
Jawani Phir Nahi Ani – ‡	Nadeem Baig – Jawani Phir Nahi Ani ‡
Best Actor Jury	Best Actress Jury
Sarmad Sultan Khoosat – Manto ‡	Sania Saeed – Manto ‡
Viewers Choice Categories
Best Film: Jawani Phir Nahi Ani ‡; Karachi Se Lahore; Manto; Moor; Wrong No.	Best Director: Nadeem Baig – Jawani Phir Nahi Ani ‡; Yasir Nawaz – Wrong No.; Wajahat Rauf – Karachi Se Lahore; Sarmad Sultan Khoosat – Manto; Jami – Moor; Adnan Sarwar – Shah
Best Actor: Humayun Saeed – Jawani Phir Nahi Ani ‡; Danish Taimoor – Wrong No.; Sarmad Sultan Khoosat – Manto; Hameed Sheikh – Moor; Adnan Sarwar – Shah	Best Actress: Sohai Ali Abro – Jawani Phir Nahi Ani ‡; Mehwish Hayat – Jawani Phir Nahi Ani; Sohai Ali Abro – Wrong No.; Ayesha Omer – Karachi Se Lahore; Sania Saeed – Manto; Soniya Hussain – Moor
Best Supporting Actor: Hamza Ali Abbasi – Jawani Phir Nahi Ani ‡; Ahmed Ali Butt – Jawani Phir Nahi Ani; Vasay Chaudhry – Jawani Phir Nahi Ani; Yasir Hussain – Karachi Se Lahore; Javed Sheikh – Wrong No.	Best Supporting Actress: Ayesha Khan – Jawani Phir Nahi Ani ‡; Sarwat Gilani – Jawani Phir Nahi Ani; Saba Qamar – Manto; Sabeeka Imam – Jalaibee; Janita Asma – Wrong No.
Best Star Debut Male: Danish Taimoor – Jalaibee ‡; Ahmed Ali Butt – Jawani Phir Nahi Ani; Vasay Chaudhry – Jawani Phir Nahi Ani; Yasir Hussain – Karachi Se Lahore; Adnan Sarwar – Shah	Best Star Debut Female: Ayesha Omer – Karachi Se Lahore ‡; Sarwat Gilani – Jawani Phir Nahi Ani; Soniya Hussain – Moor; Sohai Ali Abro – Wrong No.; Janita Asma – Wrong No.
Best Actor in a Comic Role: Ahmed Ali Butt – Jawani Phir Nahi Ani ‡; Bushra Ansari – Jawani Phir Nahi Ani; Ismail Tara – Halla Gulla; Yasir Hussain – Karachi Se Lahore; Danish Nawaz – Wrong No.	Best Actor in a Negative Role: Ayaz Samoo – Moor ‡; Rasheed Naz – Karachi Se Lahore; Shafqat Cheema – Wrong No.; Ismail Tara – Jawani Phir Nahi Ani; Akbar Subhani – Manto
Best Male Playback Singer: Rahat Fateh Ali Khan – "Saroor De" from Halla Gulla ‡; Nabeel Shaukat Ali – "Nachay Mann" from Wrong No.; Asrar – "Bhaag Ja" from Wrong No.; Ali Sethi – "Aah Ko Chahiye" from Manto; Mika Singh – "Khul Jaye Botal" from Jawani Phir Nahi Ani; Umair Jaswal – "Jalaibee" from Jalaibee	Best Female Playback Singer: Sara Raza Khan – "Dheeray Dheeray" from Wrong No. ‡; Meesha Shafi – "Mehram Dilaan De Mahi" from Manto; Sara Haider – "Tauba Tauba" from Dekh Magar Pyar Se; Sana Zulfiqar – "Jalwa" from Jawani Phir Nahi Ani; Ghazal Ali – "Jawani" from Jalaibee
Technical Awards
Best Background Score	Best Original Music
Moor – Strings ‡	Jawani Phir Nahi Ani – Shani Arshad ‡
Best Story	Best Screenplay
Jawani Phir Nahi Ani – Vasay Chaudhry ‡	Jawani Phir Nahi Ani – Vasay Chaudhry ‡
Best Dialogue	Best Action
Jawani Phir Nahi Ani – Vasay Chaudhry ‡	Jawani Phir Nahi Ani – Viktor Krav ‡
Best Cinematography	Best Choreography
Moor – Farhan Hafeez ‡	Jawani Phir Nahi Ani – Shabina Khan ‡
Best Makeup and Hairstyling	Best Costume Design
Jawani Phir Nahi Ani – Nabila ‡	Jawani Phir Nahi Ani – Jahanzeb Qamar and Nabila ‡
Best Film Editing	Best Special Effects Visual
Jawani Phir Nahi Ani – Rizwan AQ ‡	Moor – Tahir Moosa (Sharp Image) ‡

=== Honorary ARY Film Awards ===
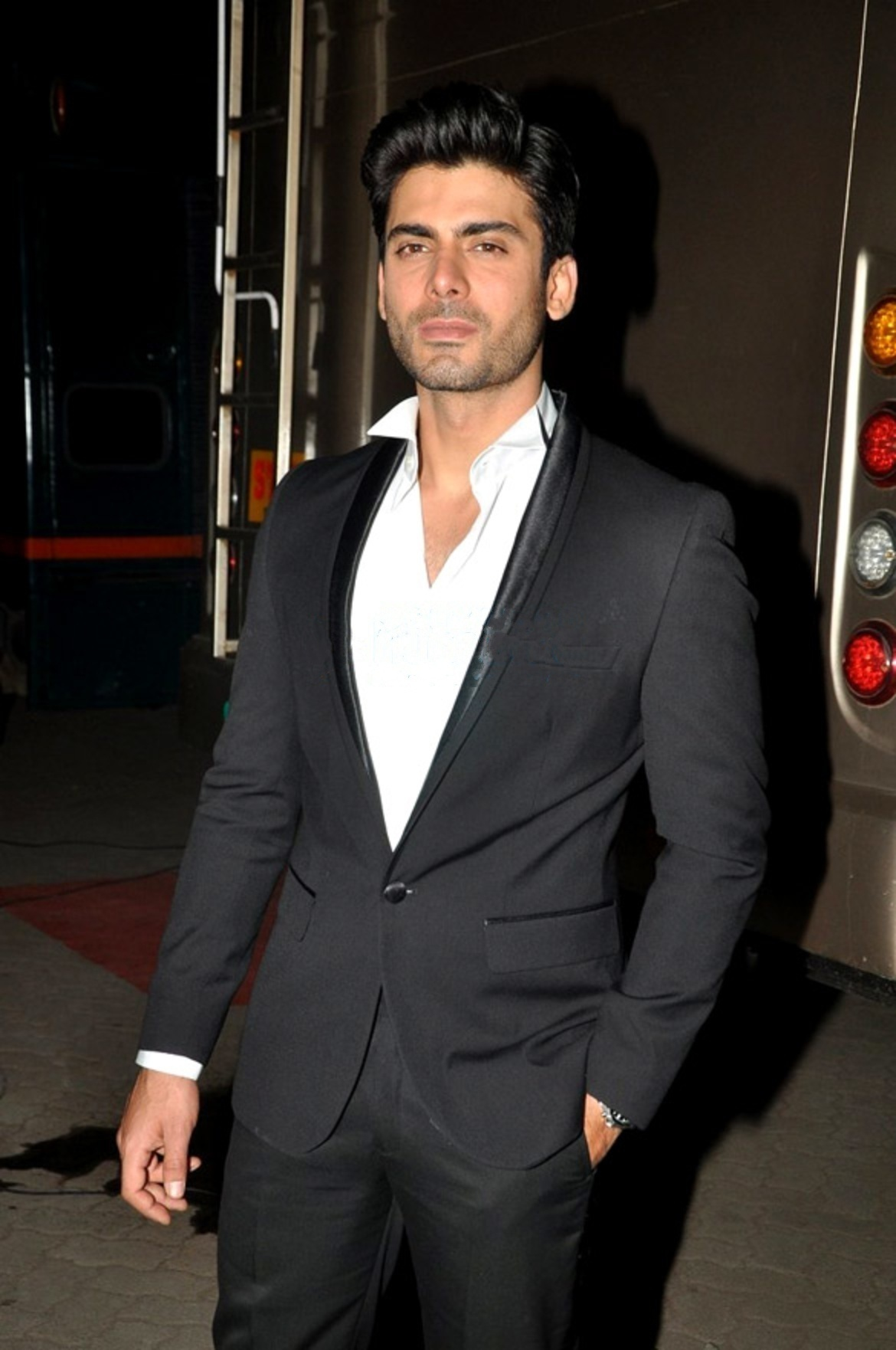
Fawad Khan, International Icon of the Year award winner

The ARY presented following annual Special Awards during the ceremony:

Lifetime Achievement Award

- Javed Sheikh

International Icon Award

- Fawad Khan

Special award for contributing Pakistani Cinema

- Waheed Murad

=== Films with multiple nominations and awards ===
Films that received multiple nominations
Nominations	Film
29	Jawani Phir Nahi Ani
13	Wrong No.
10	Manto
9	Moor
8	Karachi Se Lahore
4	Jalaibee
3	Shah
2	Halla Gulla

Films that received multiple awards
Awards	Film
20	Jawani Phir Nahi Ani
4	Moor
2	Manto

== See also ==
- 15th Lux Style Awards
- 4th Hum Awards
