= ARY Film Award for Best Supporting Actress =

Pakistani film award

- Awarded for: Best Performance by an Actress in a Supporting Role
- Country: Pakistan
- Presented by: ARY Digital Network and Entertainment Channel
- First award: 2014 (for the films released in 2013)
- Currently held by: Hamza Ali Abbasi, Waar (2013)
- Website: aryfilmawards.com

ARY Film Award for Best Supporting Actress is one of the ARY Film Awards of Merit presented annually by the ARY Digital Network and Entertainment Channel to recognize the female actor who has delivered an outstanding performance while working in the film industry. Since its inception, however, the award has commonly been referred to as the AFA for Best Supporting Actor. While actors are nominated for this award by Academy members who are actors and actresses themselves, winners are selected by the AFA membership as a whole.

== History ==
The Best Supporting Actress category has originated with the 1st ARY Film Awards ceremony circa 2014. The Best Supporting Actress is awarded by viewers voting and known as Best Supporting Actress Viewers Choice but officially it is termed as Best Supporting Actress.

== Winners and nominees ==
For the Best Supporting Actress winner, it is decided by viewers. It is simply regarded as Best Supporting Actress as compared to the other four Jury Awards which have the "super-fix" of Jury. As of the first ceremony, a total of five actresses were nominated. This category is among fourteen Viewers Awards in ARY Film Awards.

Not unlike other award shows, the award ceremony is held for the films of its previous year.

=== 2010s ===
Indicates the winner

Year	Actor	Film	Role	Ref
2013 (1st)	Misha Shafi	Waar	Laxmi	
2013 (1st)	Ainy Jaffri	Main Hoon Shahid Afridi	Alisha	
2013 (1st)	Nyla Jafri	Josh	Nusrat Bee	
2013 (1st)	Naghma Beghum	Zinda Bhaag	Ammi Jee	
2013 (1st)	Mahnoor Usman	Siyaah		
Ceremony wasn't held for 2014 films in 2015
2015 (2nd)	Ayesha Khan	Jawani Phir Nahi Ani	Kubra	
2015 (2nd)	Sarwat Gilani	Jawani Phir Nahi Ani	Gul	
2015 (2nd)	Saba Qamar	Manto	Noor Jehan	
2015 (2nd)	Sabeeka Imam	Jalaibee	Eman	
2015 (2nd)	Janita Asma	Wrong No.	Haya	
