= ARY Film Award for Best Star Debut Male =

Pakistani film award

- Awarded for: Best Debut Performance by an Actor
- Country: Pakistan
- Presented by: ARY Digital Network and Entertainment Channel
- First award: 2014 (for the films released in 2013)
- Currently held by: Danish Taimoor, Jalaibee (2015)
- Website: aryfilmawards.com

ARY Film Award for Best Star Debut Male is one of the ARY Film Awards of Merit presented annually by the ARY Digital Network and Entertainment Channel to recognize the male actor who has delivered an outstanding debut performance while working in the film industry. Since its inception, however, the award has commonly been referred to as the AFA for Best Star Debut Male. While actors are nominated for this award by AFA members who are actors and actresses themselves, winners are selected by the AFA membership as a whole.

== History ==
The Best Star Debut Male category originates with the 1st ARY Film Awards ceremony since 2014. The Best Star Debut Male is awarded by viewers voting and known as Best Star Debut Male Viewers Choice but officially it is termed as Best Star Debut Male. Since ARY Film Awards has been just started, this category has not a brief history.

Hamza Ali Abbasi who is the current winner of this category have also won Best Supporting Actor for his performance in Waar.

== Winners and nominees ==
As of the first ceremony, total of five actors were nominated. This category is among fourteen Viewers Awards in ARY Film Awards. Date and the award ceremony shows that the 2010 is the period from 2010 to 2020 (10 years-decade), while the year above winners and nominees shows that the film year in which they were releases, and the figure in bracket shows the ceremony number, for example; an award ceremony is held for the films of its previous year.

=== 2010s ===
Indicates the winner

Year	Debut Actor - Male	Film	Role	Ref
2013 1st	Hamza Ali Abbasi	Main Hoon Shahid Afridi	Maulvi Majeed	
2013 1st	Mohammed Ehteshamuddin	Chambaili	Musa	
2013 1st	Noman Habib	Main Hoon Shahid Afridi	Shahid Bhatt	
2013 1st	Ali Azmat	Waar	Ejaz Khan	
2013 1st	Khurram Patras	Zinda Bhaag	Khaldi	
Ceremony wasn't held for 2014 films in 2015
2015 (2nd)	Danish Taimoor	Jalaibee	Billu	
2015 (2nd)	Ahmed Ali Butt	Jawani Phir Nahi Ani	Parvez / Pepe	
2015 (2nd)	Vasay Chaudhry	Jawani Phir Nahi Ani	Sheikh	
2015 (2nd)	Yasir Hussain	Karachi Se Lahore	Moti	
2015 (2nd)	Adnan Sarwar	Shah	Hussain Shah	
