= ARY Film Award for Best Actor =

Pakistani film award

- Awarded for: Best Performance by an Actor in a Leading Role
- Country: Pakistan
- Presented by: ARY Digital Network and Entertainment Channel
- First award: 2014 (for the films released in 2013)
- Currently held by: Humayun Saeed, Jawani Phir Nahi Aani (2015)
- Website: aryfilmawards.com

The ARY Film Award for Best Actor is one of the ARY Film Awards of Merit presented annually by the ARY Digital Network and Entertainment Channel to male actor working in the film industry. Best Actor is considered to be one of five most important awards of the ARY Film Awards, as it represents the main icon of cinematic industry on which all aspects of film such as directing, acting, music composing, writing, editing and other efforts that put forth into a drama is depending. This award is one of the two Best Actor awards in ceremony, in which one is awarded to relevant film actor only by the decision of ceremony Jury, while other is being awarded on Viewers votings.

== History ==
The Best Actor category originates with the 1st ARY Film Awards ceremony since 2014. The Best Actor is awarded by viewers voting and known as Best Actor Viewers Choice but officially it is termed as Best Actor. Since ARY Film Awards has been just started, this category has not a brief history.

== Winners and nominees ==
For the Best Actor winner, which is decided by Viewers, but simply regarded as Best Actor as compared to other Best Actor Award which has superfix of Best Actor Jury. As of the first ceremony, total of Six actors were nominated, while Humayun Saeed who won Best Actor Jury Award was also nominated in Best Actor category, and hence any actor who won Jury award can eligible for nomination in Viewers choice awards. This category is among fourteen Viewers Awards in ARY Film Awards..

Date and the award ceremony shows that the 2010 is the period from 2010 to 2020 (decade), while the year above winners and nominees shows that the film year in which they were releases, and the figure in bracket shows the ceremony number, for example; an award ceremony is held for the films of its previous year.

| Indicates the winner |

| Year | Actor | Film | Role | Ref |
|---|---|---|---|---|
| 2013 (1st) | Shaan Shahid | Waar | Mujtaba | |
| 2013 (1st) | Humayun Saeed | Main Hoon Shahid Afridi | Akbar | |
| 2013 (1st) | Mohib Mirza | Lamha | Raza | |
| 2013 (1st) | Ahsan Khan | Ishq Khuda | Ahsan | |
| 2013 (1st) | Khurram Patras | Zinda Bhaag | Khaldi | |
| 2013 (1st) | Adnan Shah | Josh | Gulsher | |
| 2015 (2nd) | Humayun Saeed | Jawani Phir Nahi Ani | Sherry | |
| 2015 (2nd) | Danish Taimoor | Wrong No. | Sallu/Shehryar | |
| 2015 (2nd) | Sarmad Sultan Khoosat | Manto | Manto | |
| 2015 (2nd) | Hameed Sheikh | Moor | Wahid Khan | |
| 2015 (2nd) | Adnan Sarwar | Shah | Hussain Shah | |
