= ARY Film Award for Best Actor in a Comic Role =

Pakistani film award

- Awarded for: Best Performance by an Actor in a Comic Role
- Country: Pakistan
- Presented by: ARY Digital Network and Entertainment Channel
- First award: 2014 (for the films released in 2013)
- Currently held by: Ismail Tara, Main Hoon Shahid Afridi (2013)
- Website: aryfilmawards.com

ARY Film Award for Best Actor in a Comic Role is one of the ARY Film Awards of Merit presented annually by the ARY Digital Network and Entertainment Channel to recognize the Male and female comic actor who has delivered an outstanding comedy performance while working in the film industry.

== History ==
The Best Actor in a Comic Role category originates with the 1st ARY Film Awards ceremony since 2014. The Best Actor in a Comic Role is awarded by viewers voting and known as Best Actor in a Comic Role Viewers Choice but officially it is termed as Best Actor in a Comic Role. Since ARY Film Awards has been just started, this category has not a brief history.

== Category ==
In ARY Film Awards, both performances by an actor in a Negative and Comic role, has been placed in different categories but both Male and Female actors are placed in single category, either for comic performance or for villain performance.

== Winners and nominees ==
As of the first ceremony, total of two were nominated. This category is among fourteen Viewers Awards in ARY Film Awards. Date and the award ceremony shows that the 2010 is the period from 2010 to 2020 (10 years-decade), while the year above winners and nominees shows that the film year in which they were releases, and the figure in bracket shows the ceremony number, for example; an award ceremony is held for the films of its previous year.

=== 2010s ===
Indicates the winner

Year	Actor	Film	Role	Ref
2013 (1st)	Ismail Tara	Main Hoon Shahid Afridi	Malick Khalid	
2013 (1st)	Zohaib Asghar	Zinda Bhaag	Taambi	
Ceremony wasn't held for 2014 films in 2015
2015 (2nd)	Bushra Ansari	Jawani Phir Nahi Ani		
2015 (2nd)	Ismail Tara	Halla Gulla		
2015 (2nd)	Yasir Hussain	Karachi Se Lahore		
2015 (2nd)	Ahmed Ali Butt	Jawani Phir Nahi Ani		
2015 (2nd)	Danish Nawaz	Wrong No.		
