= Sarah Gandapur =

- Born: Sarah Jawaid; Bannu, KP, Pakistan
- Education: Pakistan School of Fashion Design
- Occupations: Designer, Journalist, Media personality & Social & Animal Rights Activist.
- Known for: Chambaili
- Label: Sarah Gandapur (1980-present)
- Awards: ARY Film Awards; Lux Style Awards
- Website: sarahgandapur.com

Sarah Gandapur is a Pakistani fashion designer and fashion journalist. She rose to prominence by exhibiting number of fashion shows and fashion weeks. She also debuted as a costume designer for films and was awarded ARY Film Award for Best Costume Design for Chambaili.

== Career ==
Sarah started her career in 2005 after graduating fashion design. She started an in-house studio and took orders on special demands. Later in 2007, she established herself as one of the leading fashion designers for women. At one point she started designing for men as well, but renewed her focus on clothing for women; as by her own account, men's clothing was not her forte.

== Awards and honors ==
Sarah won numerous awards for participating in international fashion weeks and exhibitions, and was awarded "Best youngest fashion Journalist" on International Women's Day at the 3rd Sukh Chan and Wellness club awards. She also served as the youngest Jury member three times for Lux Style Awards in selecting fashion awards winners. She won an award for Best Costume Designer for Chambaili at the ARY Film Awards 2014.
