= ARY Film Award for Best Star Debut Female =

Pakistani film award

ARY Film Award for Star Debut Female
- Awarded for: Best Debut Performance by an Actress
- Country: Pakistan
- Presented by: ARY Digital Network and Entertainment Channel
- First award: 2014 (for the films released in 2013)
- Currently held by: Ayesha Khan, Main Hoon Shahid Afridi (2013)
- Website: aryfilmawards.com

ARY Film Award for Best Star Debut Female is one of the ARY Film Awards of Merit presented annually by the ARY Digital Network and Entertainment Channel to recognize the female actor who has delivered an outstanding debut performance while working in the film industry. Since its inception, the award is commonly called the AFA for Best Star Debut Female. Actors are nominated for this award by actor and actress AFA members; winners are selected by the AFA membership as a whole.

== History ==
The Best Star Debut Female category originates with the 1st ARY Film Awards ceremony since 2014. The Best Star Debut Female is awarded by viewers voting and known as Best Star Debut Female Viewers Choice but officially it is termed as Best Star Debut Female. Since ARY Film Awards has been just started, this category has not a brief history.

== Winners and nominees ==
As of the first ceremony, total of five actors were nominated. This category is among fourteen Viewers Awards in ARY Film Awards. Date and the award ceremony shows that the 2010 is the period from 2010 to 2020 (10 years-decade), while the year above winners and nominees shows that the film year in which they were releases, and the figure in bracket shows the ceremony number, for example; an award ceremony is held for the films of its previous year.

=== 2010s ===
Indicates the winner

Year	Debut Actor - Female	Film	Role	Ref
2013 1st	Ayesha Khan	Waar	Javeria	
2013 1st	Ainy Jaffri	Main Hoon Shahid Afridi	Alina	
2013 1st	Aamina Sheikh	Lamha	Fatima	
2013 1st	Amna Ilyas	Zinda Bhaag	Rubina	
2013 1st	Hareem Farooq	Siyaah	Natasha	
2013 1st	Maira Khan	Chambaili	Kiran	
Ceremony wasn't held for 2014 films in 2015
2015 (2nd)	Ayesha Omer	Karachi Se Lahore	Maryam	
2015 (2nd)	Sarwat Gilani	Jawani Phir Nahi Ani	Gul	
2015 (2nd)	Soniya Hussain	Moor	Amber	
2015 (2nd)	Sohai Ali Abro	Wrong No.	Laila	
2015 (2nd)	Janita Asma	Wrong No.	Haya	
