= Noman Habib =

Pakistani actor

- Born: Lahore, Punjab, Pakistan
- Other name: Nomi
- Occupations: Actor, Model
- Known for: Acting & Modeling

Noman Habib is a Pakistani actor.

== Career ==
Noman Habib Khan made his debut with the television serial Yeh Zindagi Hai in which he played the role of "Bhola". He also appeared in the television show Nachley which was aired on ARY Digital. In 2013, he made his Lollywood debut in the film Main Hoon Shahid Afridi for which he was nominated for ARY Film Award for Best Supporting Actor and ARY Film Award for Best Star Debut Male. Noman Habib Khan has also appeared in the television serial Bunty I Love You opposite Saba Qamar. In 2014, he appeared in Indian television serial Parwaz which was aired on Zee TV.

== Filmography ==
Year	Film	Role
2013	Main Hoon Shahid Afridi	Shahid

=== Television ===
Television Serial	Channel	Role	Year
Dil To Pagal Hai	Indus TV	Tooti	2006
Yeh Zindagi Hai	Geo Entertainment	Bhola	2008-13
Choti Si Kahani	PTV Home	Sarim	2011
Bunty I Love You	Hum TV	Bunty	2013
Dramay Baziyan	Hum TV		2014
Parwaaz	Zee TV		2014
Noor-e-Zindagi	Geo Entertainment	Waseem	2016
Riffat Appa Ki Bahuein	ARY Digital	Arham	2016
Wafa Ka Mausam	TV One	Bazil	2017
Jalti Baarish	TV One	Almaan	2017-18
Mohabbat Zindagi Hai	Express Entertainment		2017-19
Bechari Nadia	ARY Digital		2018
Dikhawa	Geo Entertainment		2020
Makafaat 2	Geo Entertainment		2020
Ibn-e-Hawwa	Hum TV	Ahsan aka 'Guddu'	2022
Tamasha 3	Ary Digital	Himself	2024

== Nominations ==
Year	Nominee / work	Award	Result
2014	Main Hoon Shahid Afridi	ARY Film Award for Best Supporting Actor	Nominated
2014	Main Hoon Shahid Afridi	ARY Film Award for Best Star Debut Male	Nominated
