= Waar =

2013 action thriller film by Bilal Lashari

- Theatrical release poster
- وار
- Directed by: Bilal Lashari
- Written by: Hassan Rana
- Produced by: Hassan Rana; Syed Mujtaba Tirmizi
- Starring: Shaan Shahid; Shamoon Abbasi; Ali Azmat; Aisha Khan; Meesha Shafi
- Cinematography: Bilal Lashari
- Edited by: Bilal Lashari
- Music by: Amir Munawar
- Production company: MindWorks Media
- Distributed by: ARY Films; Mandviwalla Entertainment
- Release date: 16 October 2013
- Running time: 140 minutes
- Country: Pakistan
- Languages: English; Urdu
- Budget: Rs. 170 million (US$610,000)
- Box office: Rs. 346.5 million (US$1.2 million)

Waar (Urdu: وار Wār; IPA: [ʋɑːr], transl. The Strike) is a 2013 Pakistani action thriller film directed by Bilal Lashari (in his feature directorial debut), written by Hassan Rana, and co-produced by Rana and Syed Mujtaba Tirmizi. The film stars Shaan Shahid as Major Mujtaba Rizvi, a retired Pakistan Army Officer while Meesha Shafi, Ali Azmat, Shamoon Abbasi, Aisha Khan, and Kamran Lashari star in supporting roles. The film follows Major Mujtaba Rizvi (Shahid), an officer, who returns from his retirement to save Pakistan from a major terrorist attack.

It is a stylized depiction of events surrounding Pakistan's efforts in the war on terror, including the War in North-West Pakistan and the 2009 Lahore police academy attack.

It was one of the Pakistan's highest anticipated films at the time of its release and opened to positive reviews from audiences and critics alike. It is also the fourteenth all time highest-grossing Pakistani film unadjusted for inflation.

On 7 December 2013 ARY Films and MindWorks Media announced a sequel titled, Waar 2, but ultimately stalled in development.

== Plot ==
Major Mujtaba Rizvi is a former Pakistan Army officer who took early retirement. The plot centres on a counter-terrorism operation in the northwestern tribal region of Pakistan, led by Ehtesham Khattak and coordinated by his sister, Javeria Khattak, an intelligence officer. The siblings learn of a major terrorist attack that can only be thwarted with Major Mujtaba's help.

Major Mujtaba's family was assassinated by Ramal, an agent of India's spy agency Research and Analysis Wing (R&AW), leaving him determined to avenge their deaths. By recognising Ramal's methods and tactics, Mujtaba is able to anticipate and counter his attacks.

Mulla Siraj, a Taliban leader working with Ramal, operates from a fort in the tribal region. He gives Ramal two bombs to plant in Pakistan. The operation, planned by Lax, a spy, begins with terrorists attacking a police training center to divert the attention of the security agencies, which have been monitoring suspicious activity after learning that a major terrorist attack is imminent.

One bomb is placed in a vehicle, which Ehtesham drives away in an attempt to dispose of it. The bomb explodes, killing him. The second bomb is planted at the Jinnah Convention Centre, Islamabad, but Major Mujtaba intervenes and prevents another deadly terrorist attack. He ultimately kills Ramal, thereby avenging his family's deaths.

== Cast ==
- Shaan Shahid as Major Mujtaba Rizvi, ISI agent and a retired Pakistan Army officer
- Shamoon Abbasi as Ramal, an operative of the Indian spy agency Research and Analysis Wing (R&AW)
- Meesha Shafi as Laxmi, R&AW operative
- Ali Azmat as Ejaz Khan, politician
- Hamza Ali Abbasi as SP Ehtesham Khattak, O/C Field Operations CTG
- Aisha Khan as Javeria Khattak, an intelligence officer, chief INTEL and COM analyst CTG and Ehtesham's sister
- Hassan Rana as Taha Ali, director CTG
- Bilal Lashari as Ali, sniper
- Kamran Lashari as Asher Azeem, DG Internal Security or Head of Security Wing
- Nadeem Abbas as Rana
- Batin Farooqi as Militant
- Uzma Khan as Mujtaba's wife
- Waseem Badami as a news anchor
- Naseer Afridi (cameo)

== Production ==
The title "waar" is a Hindi-Urdu language word meaning "to strike" or "attack" or "assault". Waar is primarily an English language film with some dialogue in Urdu. According to producer and writer, Hassan Rana, dubbing the film in Urdu was considered but the idea was dropped as he said it would have compromised the lead role played by Shaan Shahid. Produced by Rana (owner and CEO of Mindworks Media) and retired Pakistan Army brigadier Syed Mujtaba Tirmizi, the film is based on the topic of terrorism in Pakistan. The budget was variously said to be PKR: 170 million to PKR: 200 million.

=== Casting and crew ===
Initially, it was reported that Tom Delmar who has worked as a stunt director in Hollywood films would direct; later Bilal Lashari was chosen as the director while he was working with Rana on another project. It is Lashari's debut as a director, who had previously directed music videos and assisted Shoaib Mansoor in the film Khuda Kay Liye. Singers Ali Azmat and Meesha Shafi made their acting debuts with the film. Originally Azmat and Aisha Khan's roles were limited to a guest appearance but were later expanded into an extended cameo. Hamza Ali Abbasi, who intended to work as an assistant director, was later cast as an actor.

=== Filming ===
Produced by MindWorks Media, the film includes 400 visual effects. It took three years to complete Waar. Locations included Karachi (Pakistan), Rome (Italy), Istanbul (Turkey), Lahore (Pakistan), Islamabad, Swat Valley. It was reported in the media that the film was shot in collaboration with the Inter-Services Public Relations (ISPR), the media wing of Pakistan Armed Forces; director Lashari denied any such collaboration saying that the confusion might have arisen as MindWorks Media worked on the documentary The Glorious Resolve with ISPR when Waar was being filmed.

== Release and promotion ==
The release date was changed repeatedly and finally it was released on 16 October 2013 coinciding with Eid al-Adha in Pakistan. It was initially scheduled to release on 6 September 2013.

The first theatrical trailer of the film was launched in January 2012 while the second in January 2013. One of the trailers was viewed more than 500,000 times the same month. Waar was marketed as the most anticipated film in the history of Pakistani cinema. When the film did not make it to the screens for a considerable time after the release of these trailers, critics said it was another project that would get shelved. Shamoon Abbasi, the main antagonist, cited the lack of resources for filming as one of the reasons for its delay.

The film premiered on 10 October in Karachi and on 14 October 2013 in Rawalpindi/Islamabad. Waar was given an adults-only rating by the Sindh's provincial censor board for use of obscene language and violence. Waar was released in about forty five theaters across the country. The film premiered on television on 14 August 2014 on ARY Digital.

Though initially reported to be distributed by Warner Bros., it was distributed by ARY Films and Mandviwalla Entertainment.

The film was released in 25 countries. Waar was released in the United Arab Emirates (U.A.E.) cinemas on 12 December, where the movie actors graced the red carpet at Grand Cinema, Wafi City. It was released in cinemas across the UK on 17 January 2014. The film released in cinemas throughout Australia on 15 May 2014.

=== Home media ===
Waar has been released for streaming on Netflix.

== Reception ==
Professional ratings
Review scores
Source	Rating
The Express Tribune	3/5 stars
Dawn News	3/5 stars

Waar received positive reviews from critics and became the highest-grossing film in Pakistan at the time. Rafay Mahmood for The Express Tribune gave the movie three out of five stars and commended the cinematography, editing and sound design but viewed the story and some performances critically. According to the review, Waar is a "piece of pointless propaganda (and) is going to further confuse an already puzzled nation about Pakistan's outlook on counter-terrorism. In the long run, it will prove to be a great feature for Pakistani cinema but a damaging one for intellect."

Mohammad Kamran Jawaid of Dawn gave Waar a negative review, calling the screenplay a "codswallop of instances taped together to form narrative coherency". He also criticized the use of English, stating that "catering to the international market is one thing, but relying solely on it is either ignorance or arrogance". His review labels Waar as a "'showy' enterprise" where the "story, the plot, the resolve — in fact everything — hangs on a failing thread". Salman Khalid for Daily Times talks about the message given by the movie that highlights the "Pakistani perspective on the menace of terrorism", while acclaiming the story, direction, action sequences and individual performances. Rubban Shakeel of Skotato gave Waar 3.5/5 stars, calling it one of the best action films on Pakistan. On Skotato, too, Umer Ali called Waar "A Ray of Hope."

Because of the story, Waar has been critically reviewed in India, and received wider coverage than other Pakistani films. However, Indian film director Ram Gopal Varma praised the film, saying he was "stunned beyond belief" and congratulated Lashari.

== Box office ==
Waar opened on the first day of Eid al-Adha on 42 screens, the widest release ever, across Pakistan with 100% occupancy: It broke records with capacity audiences. It earned Rs. 1.14 crore (US$41,000) in its first day, breaking the previous record of Rs. 0.9 crore (US$32,000) held by Chennai Express. It earned Rs. 4.26 crore (US$150,000) till Friday night, breaking all previous records of Eid collections. Waar collected Rs. 9.7 crore (US$350,000) in its extended first week of nine days and added another Rs. 3.7 crore (US$130,000), thus making a total of Rs. 13 crore (US$470,000) in thirteen days. The film managed to collect Rs. 1.9 crore (US$68,000) in its 4th week but was still behind Syed Noor's 1998 Choorian, which earned Rs. 20 crore (US$720,000) and then on its 36th day of screening, it broke the record held by Choorian.

It had collected Rs. 20.9 crore (US$750,000) in seven weeks. In its eighth week it got an advantage from a ban on Indian films in Pakistan and collected Rs. 0.6 crore (US$21,000) to take its total to Rs. 21.5 crore (US$770,000). In its ninth week, it saw competition in the form of Dhoom 3 but still added another Rs. 0.52 crore (US$19,000). Waar continued its steady run in the following weeks and ended its run around Rs. 23 crore (US$820,000) becoming the highest grosser in Pakistan at that time, with worldwide collections of Rs. 40 crore (US$1.4 million). Its domestic box office collection was later broken by Dhoom 3 which grossed Rs. 24.5 crore (US$880,000) in Pakistan.

In 2014, a First Information Report (FIR) against Rana was registered with the Pakistani police bydirector Lashari. Lashari alleged that Rana had transferred all of the film's profits to his personal account. The court dismissed Rana's pre-arrest bail in the case.

== Soundtrack ==
The film's score and soundtrack were composed by Amir Munawar. The musical score, which took approximately two years to complete, was designed to function as an integral narrative element in the film.

Additional songs were contributed by Qayaas and Umair Jaswal. Indian musician Clinton Cerejo composed the songs "Saathi Salaam" and "Mauje Naina", which were previously featured on Coke Studio India, Season 2.

=== Track listing ===
No.	Title	Singer(s)	Length
1.	"Inquilaab"	Umair Jaswal
2.	"Saathi Salaam"	Sawan Khan Manganiyar, Clinton Cerejo
3.	"Mauje Naina"	Bianca Gomes, Shadab Faridi, Altamash Faridi
4.	"Halaak"
5.	"Khayal"

== Awards and nominations ==
Waar received 16 nominations at the first ARY Film Awards ultimately winning 13 awards, the highest for the ceremony.

Ceremony	Date	Category	Recipient	Result	Reference
ARY Film Awards	24 May 2014	Best Director - Jury	Bilal Lashari	Won	
ARY Film Awards	24 May 2014	Best Film	Hassan Waqas Rana	Won	
ARY Film Awards	24 May 2014	Best Director	Bilal Lashari	Won	
ARY Film Awards	24 May 2014	Best Actor	Shaan Shahid	Won	
ARY Film Awards	24 May 2014	Best Actress	Aisha Khan	Won	
ARY Film Awards	24 May 2014	Best Supporting Actor	Hamza Ali Abbasi	Won	
ARY Film Awards	24 May 2014	Best Supporting Actress	Meesha Shafi	Won	
ARY Film Awards	24 May 2014	Best Star Debut Male	Ali Azmat	Nominated	
ARY Film Awards	24 May 2014	Best Star Debut Female	Aisha Khan	Won	
ARY Film Awards	24 May 2014	Best Actor in a Negative Role	Shamoon Abbasi	Won	
ARY Film Awards	24 May 2014	Best Original Music	Amir Munawar	Nominated	
ARY Film Awards	24 May 2014	Best Playback Singer - Male	Umair Jaswal	Nominated	
ARY Film Awards	24 May 2014	Best Action	Hassan Waqas Rana	Won	
ARY Film Awards	24 May 2014	Best Cinematography	Bilal Lashari	Won	
ARY Film Awards	24 May 2014	Best Editing	Bilal Lashari	Won	
ARY Film Awards	24 May 2014	Best Special Effects	Hassan Waqas Rana	Won	
Lux Style Awards	4 December 2014	Best Film	Hassan Waqas Rana	Nominated	
Lux Style Awards	4 December 2014	Best Director	Bilal Lashari	Nominated	
Lux Style Awards	4 December 2014	Best Actor	Shaan Shahid	Nominated	
Lux Style Awards	4 December 2014	Best Original Soundtrack	Amir Munawar	Nominated	

== See also ==
- Cinema of Pakistan
- Lollywood
- List of highest-grossing Pakistani films
- List of Pakistani films of 2013

== Additional references ==
- Khan, Sher (28 August 2012). "Genius or moron – you decide, says Waar producer". Lahore: The Express Tribune.
- "'Waar,' Pakistani Movie Blockbuster, Sets Records By Bashing India (VIDEO)". Huffington Post. 15 October 2013.
- "Stars of Pak blockbuster 'Waar' coming to Dubai to meet fans". Emirates 24/7. 10 December 2013.
- "Pak film 'Waar', which slams India, makes waves across the world". FirstPost.World. 9 November 2013.
- "Unrest of Indian leaders & media on success of Pak movie Waar". The Frontier Post.
- "Pakistani movie review: 'Waar' presents a new perspective to the war on terror". Emirates 24/7. 12 December 2013.
- "Action movie Waar has 'a dangerous narrative'". The National. 11 November 2013.
- "Pakistani film Waar looks at recent history from a different perspective". The National. 15 December 2013.
- "The UAE on Waar: Technically good, message, not so much". Tribune. 18 December 2013.
- "Waar hits the bullseye". Gulf News. 18 December 2013.
- "Expats react to Pakistani action thriller 'Waar' after UAE release". Sarwat Nasir. Archived from the original on 21 December 2013.
- Farouq, Umar (21 November 2013). "Pakistan's latest 'Waar' movie destroys box-office rivals". Asharq Al-awsat. Archived from the original on 9 August 2016.
- "Director's cut: 'Waar' is more pro-Pakistan, than anti-India". Emirates 24/7.
