= ARY Film Award for Best Editing =

Pakistani film award

- Country: Pakistan
- Presented by: ARY Digital Network and Entertainment Channel
- First award: 2014 (for the films released in 2013)
- Currently held by: Bilal Lashari, Waar (2013)
- Website: aryfilmawards.com

The ARY Film Award for Best Editing or Film Editing is an ARY Film Award that is awarded each year to the best editors. It is one of eleven Technical Awarding category.

== History ==
The Best Background Score category originates with the 1st ARY Film Awards ceremony since 2014. This category has been given to the best film editor for his/her work for the films of previous year to the ceremony held by Jury selection.

== Winners and nominees ==
As of 2014, No nominations were made, winner selection and nomination were wholly made by AFAS Jury of Technical award.

=== 2010s ===
Year	Film	Editor(s)
2013 (1st)
2013 (1st)	Waar	Bilal Lashari

=== 2016 ===
Year	Film	Editor(s)
2016 (2nd)
2016 (2nd)	Jawani Phir Nahi Ani	Rizwan AQ
