= ARY Film Award for Best Actor in a Negative Role =

Pakistani film award

- Awarded for: Best Performance by an Actor in a Negative Role
- Country: Pakistan
- Presented by: ARY Digital Network and Entertainment Channel
- First award: 2014 (for the films released in 2013)
- Currently held by: Shamoon Abbasi, Waar (2013)
- Website: aryfilmawards.com

ARY Film Award for Best Actor in a Negative Role is one of the ARY Film Awards of Merit presented annually by the ARY Digital Network and Entertainment Channel to recognize the Male and Female negative actor who has delivered an outstanding villain performance while working in the film industry.

== History ==
The Best Actor in a Negative Role category originates with the 1st ARY Film Awards ceremony since 2014. The Best Actor in a Negative Role is awarded by viewers voting and known as Best Actor in a Negative Role Viewers Choice but officially it is termed as Best Actor in a Negative Role. Since ARY Film Awards has been just started, this category has not a brief history.

== Category ==
In ARY Film Awards, both performances by an actor in a Negative and Comic role, has been placed in different categories but both Male and Female actors are placed in single category, either for comic performance or for villain performance.

== Winners and nominees ==
As of the first ceremony, total of five actors were nominated. This category is among fourteen Viewers Awards in ARY Film Awards. Date and the award ceremony shows that the 2010 is the period from 2010-2020 (10 years-decade), while the year above winners and nominees shows that the film year in which they were releases, and the figure in bracket shows the ceremony number, for example; an award ceremony is held for the films of its previous year.

=== 2010s ===
Indicates the winner

Year	Actor	Film	Role	Ref
2013 (1st)	Shamoon Abbasi	Waar	Ramal	
2013 (1st)	Javed Sheikh	Main Hoon Shahid Afridi	Mian Asif Qureshi	
2013 (1st)	Shafqat Cheema	Chambaili	Musheer	
2013 (1st)	Naseeruddin Shah	Zinda Bhaag	Puhlwan	
2013 (1st)	Mahnoor Usman	Siyaah	Natasha	
Ceremony wasn't held for 2014 films in 2015
2015 (2nd)	Ayaz Samoo	Moor	Imtisal	
2015 (2nd)	Rasheed Naz	Karachi Se Lahore	Khan Sahib	
2015 (2nd)	Shafqat Cheema	Wrong No.	Shera	
2015 (2nd)	Ismail Tara	Jawani Phir Nahi Ani	Bichchhi Don / Sheikh	
2015 (2nd)	Akbar Subhani	Manto	Lawyer	
