= Nasim Akhtar Chaudhry =

Pakistani politician

Member of the National Assembly of Pakistan
- In office 17 March 2008 – 16 March 2013
- Constituency: Reserved seat for women
- In office 16 November 2002 – 15 November 2007
- Constituency: Reserved seat for women

Personal details
- Children: Hamza Ali Abbasi

Nasim Akhtar Chaudhry (Urdu: نسیم اختر چوہدری) is a Pakistani politician who was a member of the National Assembly of Pakistan from 2002 to 2013.

== Political career ==
She was elected to the National Assembly of Pakistan as a candidate of Pakistan Peoples Party on a seat reserved for women from Punjab in the 2002 Pakistani general election.

She was re-elected to the National Assembly of Pakistan as a candidate of Pakistan Peoples Party on a seat reserved for women from Punjab in the 2008 Pakistani general election. She served as chairperson of National Assembly's standing committee on law and justice during her second tenure as Member of the National Assembly.

== Personal life ==
Chaudhry's son is Hamza Ali Abbasi, who is a television anchor, director and actor.
