= ARY Film Award for International Icon of the Year =

Pakistani film award

- Awarded for: Best Performance by an Actor Outside Pakistan
- Country: Pakistan
- Presented by: ARY Digital Network and Entertainment Channel
- First award: 2014
- Currently held by: Fawad Khan, Work in India (2015)
- Website: aryfilmawards.com

The ARY Film Award for International Icon of the Year is one of the ARY Film Awards presented annually by the ARY Digital Network and Entertainment Channel to actors (Male or Female) working outside Pakistan.

== Selection System ==
International Icons have been awarded since 2014 when ARY Film Awards started. Being a prestigious award, International Icon Award has no nominee system. It is jury choice award.

== Winners ==
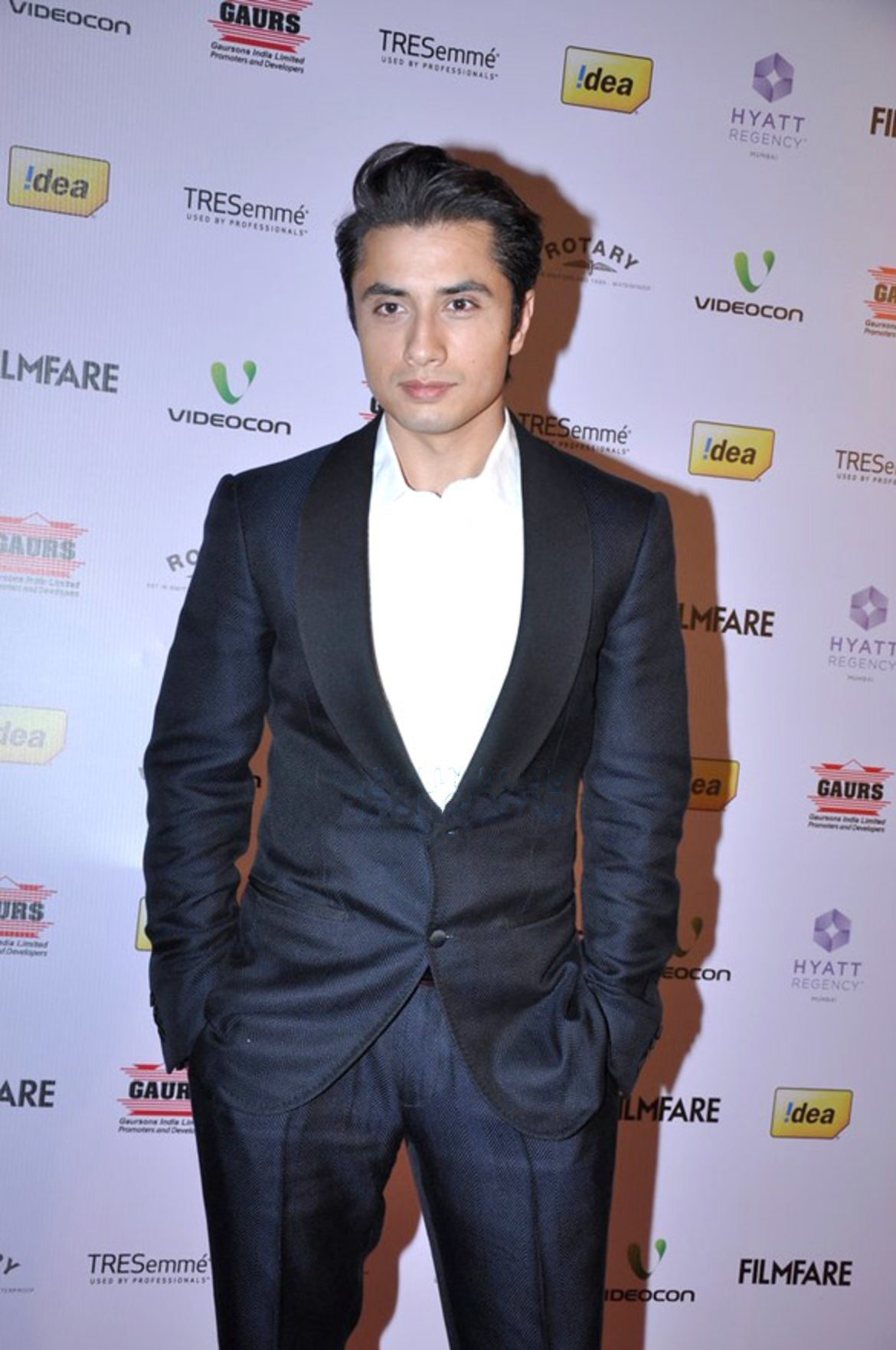
Ali Zafar, International Icon Award winner of 2013

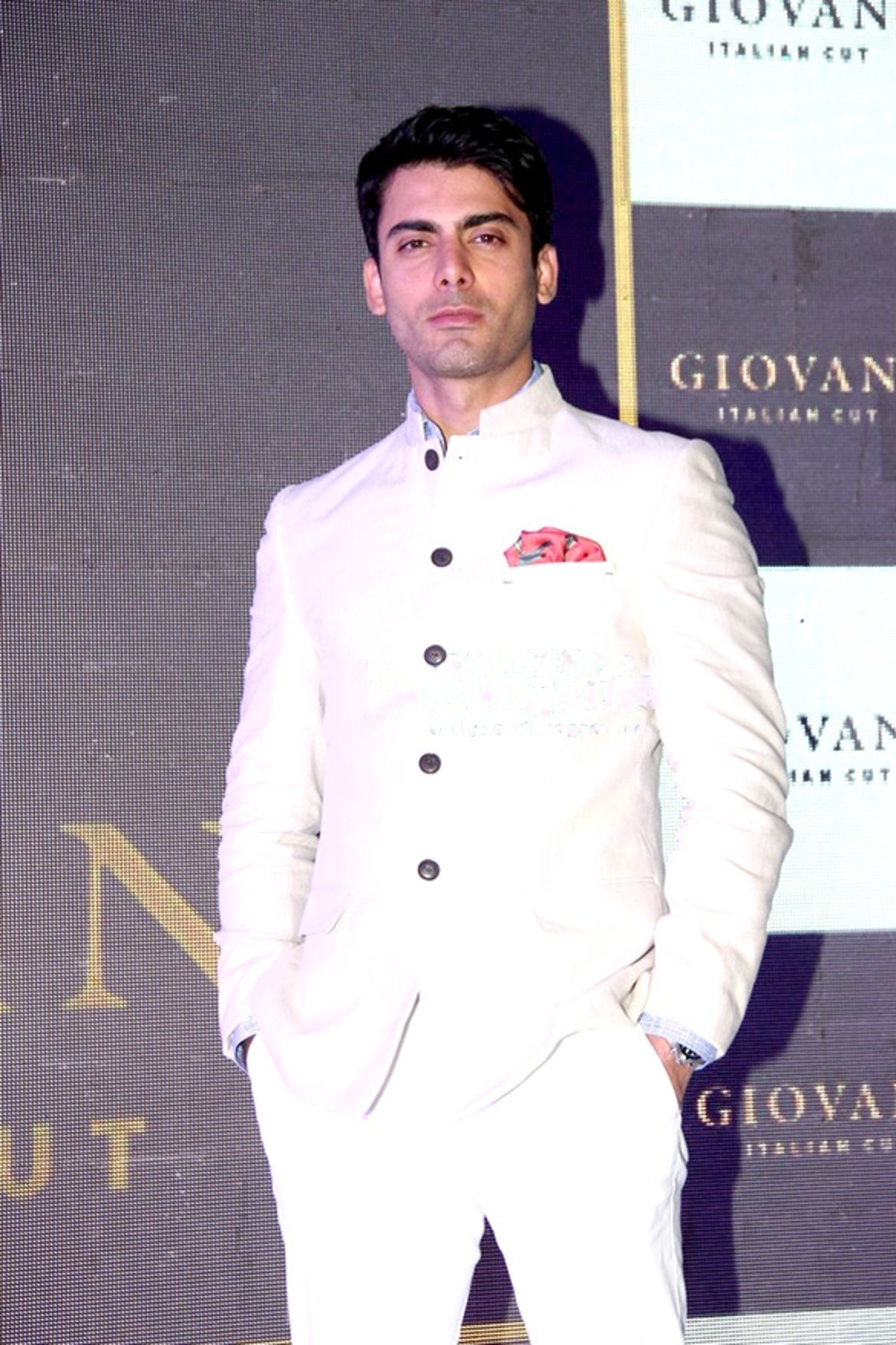
Fawad Khan, International Icon Award winner of 2015

International Icon Award was first awarded to Ali Zafar for his excellent achievement in Bollywood. At 2nd ARY Film Awards, Fawad Khan won this award for his excellence and achievement in India.

Year	Winner	Source
2013	Ali Zafar	
2015	Fawad Khan	
