= ARY Film Award for Best Cinematography =

Annual Pakistani film award

- Country: Pakistan
- Presented by: ARY Digital Network and Entertainment Channel
- First award: 2014 (for the films released in 2013)
- Currently held by: Bilal Lashari, Waar (2013)
- Website: aryfilmawards.com

The ARY Film Award for Best Cinematography is an ARY Film Award that is awarded each year to a cinematographer for work in one particular motion picture. It is one of eleven Technical Awarding category.

== History ==
The Best Cinematography category originates with the 1st ARY Film Awards ceremony since 2014. This category has been given to the best Cinematographer for his/her work for the films of previous year to the ceremony held by Jury selection.

== Winners and Nominees ==
As of 2014, No nominations were made, winner selection and nomination were wholly made by AFAS Jury of Technical award.

=== 2010s ===
Year	Film	Cinematographer(s)
2013 (1st)
2013 (1st)	Waar	Bilal Lashari
