= ARY Film Award for Best Supporting Actor =

Pakistani film award

- Awarded for: Best Performance by an Actor in a Supporting Role
- Country: Pakistan
- Presented by: ARY Digital Network and Entertainment Channel
- First award: 2014 (for the films released in 2013)
- Currently held by: Hamza Ali Abbasi, Waar (2013)
- Website: aryfilmawards.com

ARY Film Award for Best Supporting Actor is one of the ARY Film Awards of Merit presented annually by the ARY Digital Network and Entertainment Channel to recognize the male actor who has delivered an outstanding performance while working in the film industry. Since its inception, however, the award has commonly been referred to as the AFA for Best Supporting Actor. While actors are nominated for this award by AFA members who are actors and actresses themselves, winners are selected by the AFA membership as a whole.

== History ==
The Best Supporting Actor category originates with the 1st ARY Film Awards ceremony since 2014. The Best Supporting Actor is awarded by viewers voting and known as Best Supporting Actor Viewers Choice but officially it is termed as Best Supporting Actor. Since ARY Film Awards has been just started, this category has not a brief history.

== Winners and nominees ==
For the Best Supporting Actor winner which is decided by Viewers, but simply regarded as Best Supporting Actor as compared to other four Jury Awards which has superfix of Jury. As of the first ceremony, total of five actors were nominated. This category is among fourteen Viewers Awards in ARY Film Awards.

Date and the award ceremony shows that the 2010 is the period from 2010 to 2020 (10 years-decade), while the year above winners and nominees shows that the film year in which they were releases, and the figure in bracket shows the ceremony number, for example; an award ceremony is held for the films of its previous year.

=== 2010s ===
Indicates the winner

Year	Actor	Film	Role	Ref
2013 (1st)	Hamza Ali Abbasi	Waar	Ehtesham Khattak	
2013 (1st)	Ehtesham	Chambaili	Musa	
2013 (1st)	Noman Habib	Main Hoon Shahid Afridi	Shahid Bhatt	
2013 (1st)	Gohar Rasheed	Lamha	Abil	
2013 (1st)	Salman Ahmad	Zinda Bhaag	Tambi	
Ceremony wasn't held for 2014 films in 2015
2015 (2nd)	Hamza Ali Abbasi	Jawani Phir Nahi Ani	Saif	
2015 (2nd)	Ahmed Ali Butt	Jawani Phir Nahi Ani	Parvez / Pepe	
2015 (2nd)	Vasay Chaudhry	Jawani Phir Nahi Ani	Sheikh	
2015 (2nd)	Yasir Hussain	Karachi Se Lahore	Moti	
2015 (2nd)	Javed Sheikh	Wrong No.	Haji Abba	
