= Hamza Ali Abbasi =

Pakistani actor and politician (born 1986)

- حمزہ علی عباسی
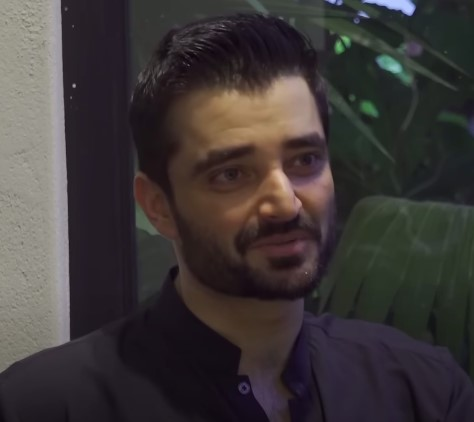
- Abbasi in 2022
- Born: 23 June 1986 (age 40); Multan, Punjab, Pakistan
- Education: Quaid-i-Azam University
- Occupations: Actor; director; Muslim religious student
- Years active: 2006–present
- Known for: Pyaray Afzal (2013); Waar (2013); Jawani Phir Nahi Ani (2015); Parwaaz Hay Junoon (2018); The Legend of Maula Jatt (2022)
- Spouse: Naimal Khawar (m. 2019)
- Mother: Nasim Akhtar Chaudhry
- Relatives: Areej Chaudhary (cousin)

Hamza Ali Abbasi (Note: Urdu: حمزہ علی عباسی) (born 23 June 1986) is a Pakistani actor and director. He is best known for his roles as Afzal in the drama serial Pyarey Afzal (2013) and as Salahuddin in the drama serial Mann Mayal (2016).

In 2013, he appeared in Main Hoon Shahid Afridi and Waar, for which he received the Best Star Debut Male and Best Supporting Actor awards at the 1st ARY Film Awards. In 2022, he played the main antagonist Noori Natt in The Legend of Maula Jatt, which stands as the highest-grossing Pakistani film as well the highest-grossing Punjabi-language film.

== Early life and education ==
Abbasi was born on 23 June 1986 in Multan into a Punjabi family of civil servants to Major (Retd) Mazhar Ali Abbasi, an army officer, and Begum Nasim Akhtar Chaudhry, a former judge and politician affiliated with the Pakistan Peoples Party. His sister Dr. Fazeela Abbasi is a dermatologist. His maternal cousin Areej Chaudhary is also an actress.

He gained his Bachelor's in International Relations from the United States and his Master's in the same subject from the Quaid-e-Azam University. While in the United States he also studied film-making.

He also passed the CSS exams and was working as a civil service officer in the police group before abandoning the job to concentrate on his passions, film-making and acting.

== Career ==
Abbasi started his career in 2006 as a theatre actor with a play titled Dally in the Dark. Later, he appeared in several plays such as Bombay Dreams, Phantom of the Opera, and Home is Where Your Clothes Are.

He began his television career in 2012 with a supporting role in Meray Dard Ko Jo Zuban Miley before getting fame for his lead roles in the serials Pyarey Afzal (2013) and Mann Mayal (2016). His breakthrough was the movie Waar (2013). He was initially an assistant director to Bilal Lashari, before the later offered him a role in the movie, that he considers important for his future career.

He voiced Baba Bandook, the main antagonist, and Vadero Pajero in the Unicorn Black produced animated series, Burka Avenger (2013).

Abbasi made his directorial debut with the feature film Mud House and the Golden Doll, released in 2011, which described as a simple story about simple people.

In December 2020, Abbasi announced that he was writing a book on religion. In August 2024, he released that book, My Discovery of Islam, God & Judgement Day.

== Personal life ==
Abbasi married painter and actress Naimal Khawar in 2019.

Abbasi was born a Muslim, then for a while became an atheist but now identifies as Muslim again. He is affiliated with the Farahi school of thought and studied in Dallas under Javed Ahmad Ghamidi.

Abbasi was a supporter of Pakistan Tehreek-e-Insaf, and he was elected as the cultural secretary of the party in January 2018. However, he resigned from this role in April of the same year because he felt that his movies did not represent Pakistan's culture well.

In 2018, he exposed journalist and former wife of Imran Khan, Reham Khan, by revealing the manuscript of her book beforehand. Reham Khan claimed to have been threatened directly by Abbasi via emails, but he denied these allegations. He believed that Reham Khan's claims were an attempt to tarnish his reputation due to his close relationship with Imran Khan.

== Filmography ==
=== Film ===
Key
†	Film are currently on Cinema
†	Denotes films that have not yet been released

Year	Title	Role	Director	Note(s)	Ref(s)
2011	The Glorious Resolve	Tariq		Documentary film	
2011	Mudhouse And The Golden Doll	Malang	Yes	Directorial debut	
2013	Main Hoon Shahid Afridi	Maulvi Majeed		ARY Film Award for Best Star Debut Male	
2013	Waar	SP Ehtesham Khattak		ARY Film Award for Best Supporting Actor	
2015	Jawani Phir Nahi Ani	Saif Ahmed		ARY Film Award for Best Supporting Actor	
2016	Ho Mann Jahaan	Malang Baba		Cameo appearance	
2017	Shaan-e-Ishq	Mehwish's brother		Cameo appearance	
2018	Parwaaz Hai Junoon	Sq/Ldr Hamza Ali Haider		Lead role	
2018	Jawani Phir Nahi Ani 2	Saif Ahmed		Special appearance as Imran Khan	
2022	The Legend of Maula Jatt	Noori Natt		Main antagonist	
2024	Umro Ayyar – A New Beginning	Umro Ayyar		Special appearance	

=== Television ===
Year	Title	Role	Network	Note(s)	Ref(s)
2012	Meray Dard Ko Jo Zuban Miley	Salaar/Azam	Hum TV	TV debut	
2013–2015	Burka Avenger	Baba Bandook	Geo Tez/Nickelodeon	Voice over	
2013	Pyaray Afzal	Afzal Subhanullah	ARY Digital	Drama series	
2013	Ek Tha Raja aur Ek Thi Rani	Farhan	ARY Digital	Telefilm	
2013	Gullo Weds Gulli	Gullo	ARY Digital	Telefilm	
2016	Mann Mayal	Salahuddin	Hum TV	Drama series	
2019	Alif	Qalb-e-Momin	Geo Entertainment	Drama series	
2023	Jaan-e-Jahan	Shahram	ARY Digital	Drama series	
2024	Faraar	Batish	Green Entertainment	Drama series	

=== Hosting and judging ===
Year	Show	Role	Channel	Note(s)	Ref(s)
2014	1st ARY Film Awards	Co-host	ARY Digital		
2015	3rd Hum Awards	Co-host	Hum TV		
2018	Debate Headquarters	Host	BOL Network		
2019	Pakistan Star	Judge	BOL Network		

== Book ==
- My Discovery of God, Islam & Judgement Day, Ghamidi Center of Islamic Learning, 2024.

== Awards and nominations ==
Year	Nominee / work	Award	Result
ARY Film Awards
2014	Waar	ARY Film Award for Best Supporting Actor	Won
2014	Main Hoon Shahid Afridi	ARY Film Award for Best Star Debut Male	Won
2016	Jawani Phir Nahi Ani	Best Supporting Actor	Won
Lux Style Awards
2015	Pyarey Afzal	Best TV Actor	Won
2021	Alif	Best TV Actor (Viewers' Choice)	Nominated
2021	Alif	Best TV Actor (Critics' Choice)	Nominated
Hum TV Awards
2017	Mann Mayal	Best Actor Popular	Won
2017	Mann Mayal	Best Onscreen Couple	Won
International Pakistan Prestige Awards
2017	Style Icon of the Year Male		Won
