= Mahnoor Usman =

Pakistani film actress

- Born: Mahnoor Usman; 17 May 2000 (age 25); Rawalpindi, Punjab, Pakistan
- Education: Bachelors in Business Administration
- Alma mater: SLS
- Occupation(s): Film actress, Business analyst and Social worker
- Years active: 2013-present
- Notable work: Siyaah

Mahnoor Usman (Urdu: ماہ نور عثمان, born 17 May 2000) is a Pakistani actress. She marked her debut as a child actor in the independent film Siyaah and was nominated as "Best Actor in a Negative Role" at the 1st ARY Film Awards. Usman has had roles in local dramas and TV commercials.

== Career ==
Usman started her career at the age of 8 as a theatre performer. She marked her film debut in Siyaah, where she played an emotionally reclusive orphan adopted by a couple who cannot have a child. Usman has not been seen in the entertainment industry since her first film.

Usman has worked in various aspects of business, including HR, marketing, and customer care, leading several campaigns throughout Pakistan for multinational companies and startups. Currently, she is the official consultant of Being Woman UK, a charity organization in Ashington, Northumberland. She continues her studies side by side.

=== Films ===
Year	Film	Role	Notes
2013	Siyaah	Natasha	Nominated: Lux Style Awards for Best Actress; Nominated: ARY Film Award for Best Actor in a Negative Role Nominated: ARY Film Award for Best Actress in Supporting Role
