= Madinat Jumeirah =

Resort in Dubai

Coordinates: 25°7′58″N 55°11′5″E

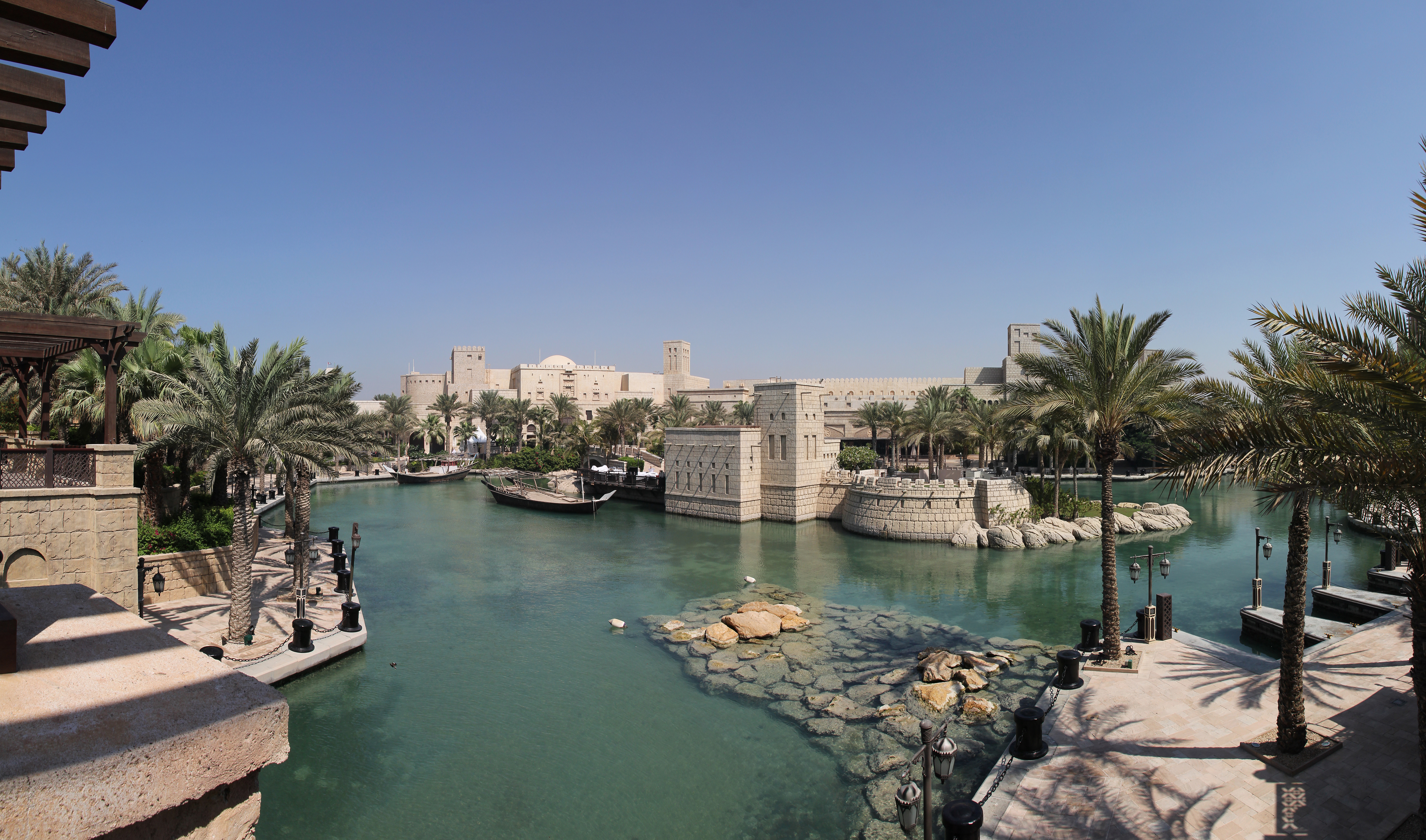
Madinat Jumeirah

Madinat Jumeirah the Arabian Resort - Dubai is a resort in Dubai. It is the largest resort in the Emirate of Dubai, spreading across over 40 hectares of landscapes and gardens designed to resemble a traditional Arabian town. The resort comprises three boutique hotels (Jumeirah Al Qasr, Jumeirah Mina A'Salam, and Jumeirah Al Naseem) and a courtyard of 29 summer houses called Jumeirah Dar Al Masyaf.

== Design ==
Madinat Jumeirah encompasses three boutique hotels and one cluster of summerhouses; Al Qasr, Mina A'Salam, Al Naseem, and Dar Al Masyaf; Arabic summerhouses located around the resort grounds.

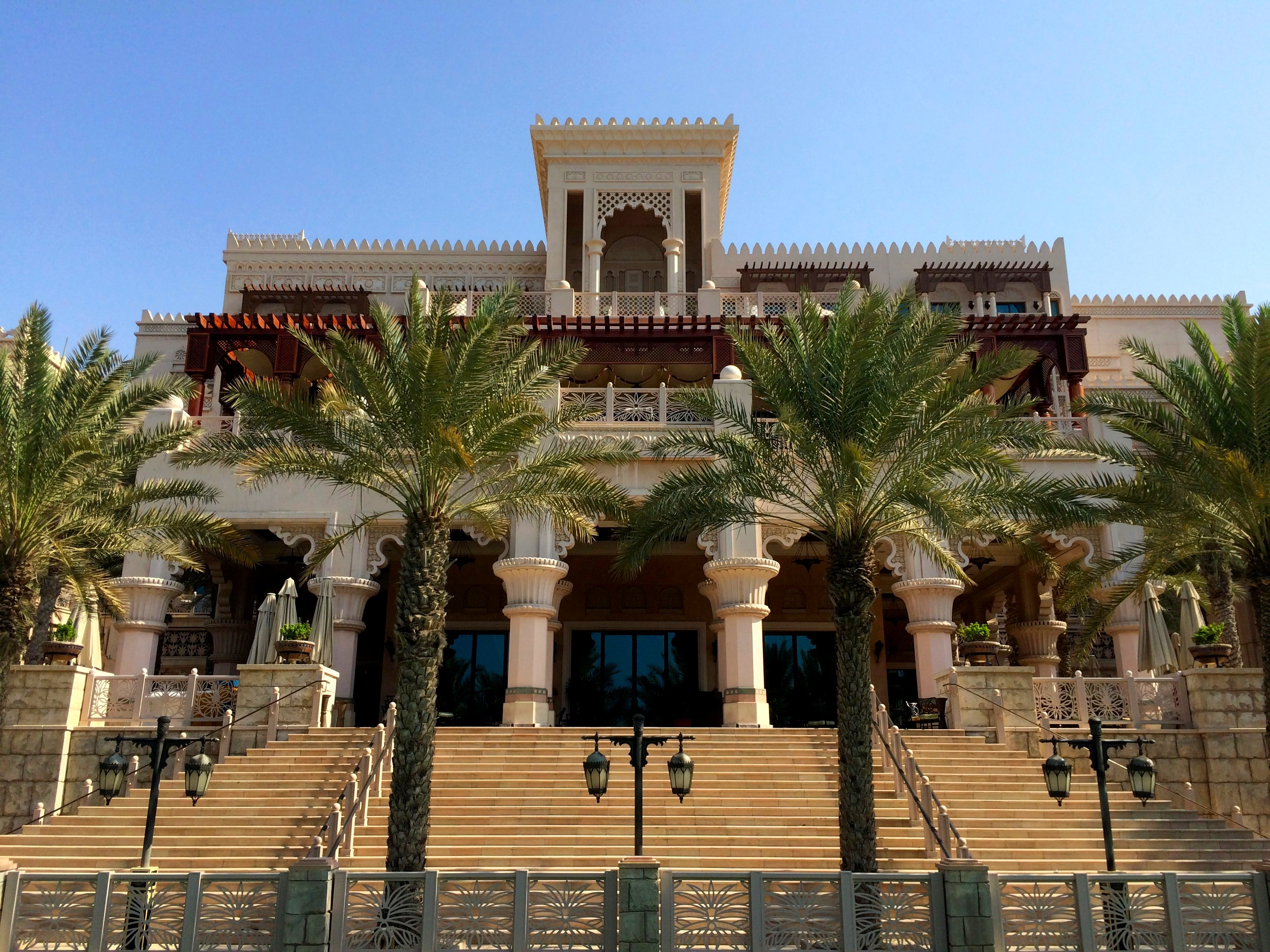
Al Qasr hotel

Mina A’ Salam or 'The Harbour of Peace' was the first of the boutique hotels to be completed, and features 292 rooms and suites.

Al Qasr, which literally translates to 'The Palace', is made up of 294 rooms and suites, designed to reflect a summer residence.

Dar Al Masyaf consists of 29 stand-alone, two-story residential retreats inspired by traditional Arabian summer houses. Each of the 29 'houses' features 9–11 rooms and suites which are extended across the resort grounds.

Al Naseem, which translates to 'The Breeze', the latest of the boutique hotels to be completed, comprises 430 rooms and suites. It is, however, the only hotel in Madinat Jumeirah without a connection to the other hotels via waterway.

5.4 km of waterways link the different areas of the resort, and water taxis (abra) allow guests to travel along them to all parts of the resort.

== Gallery ==
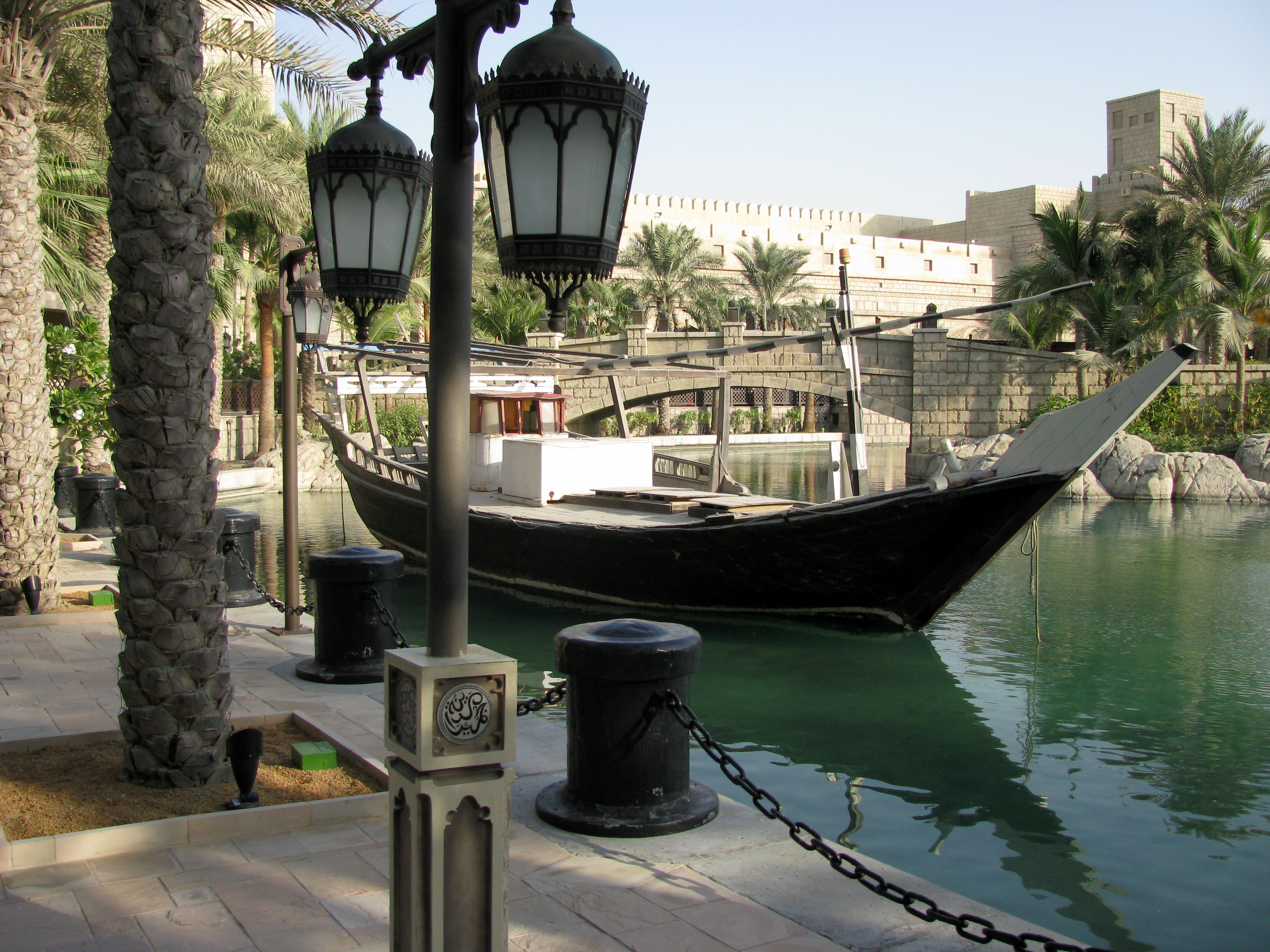

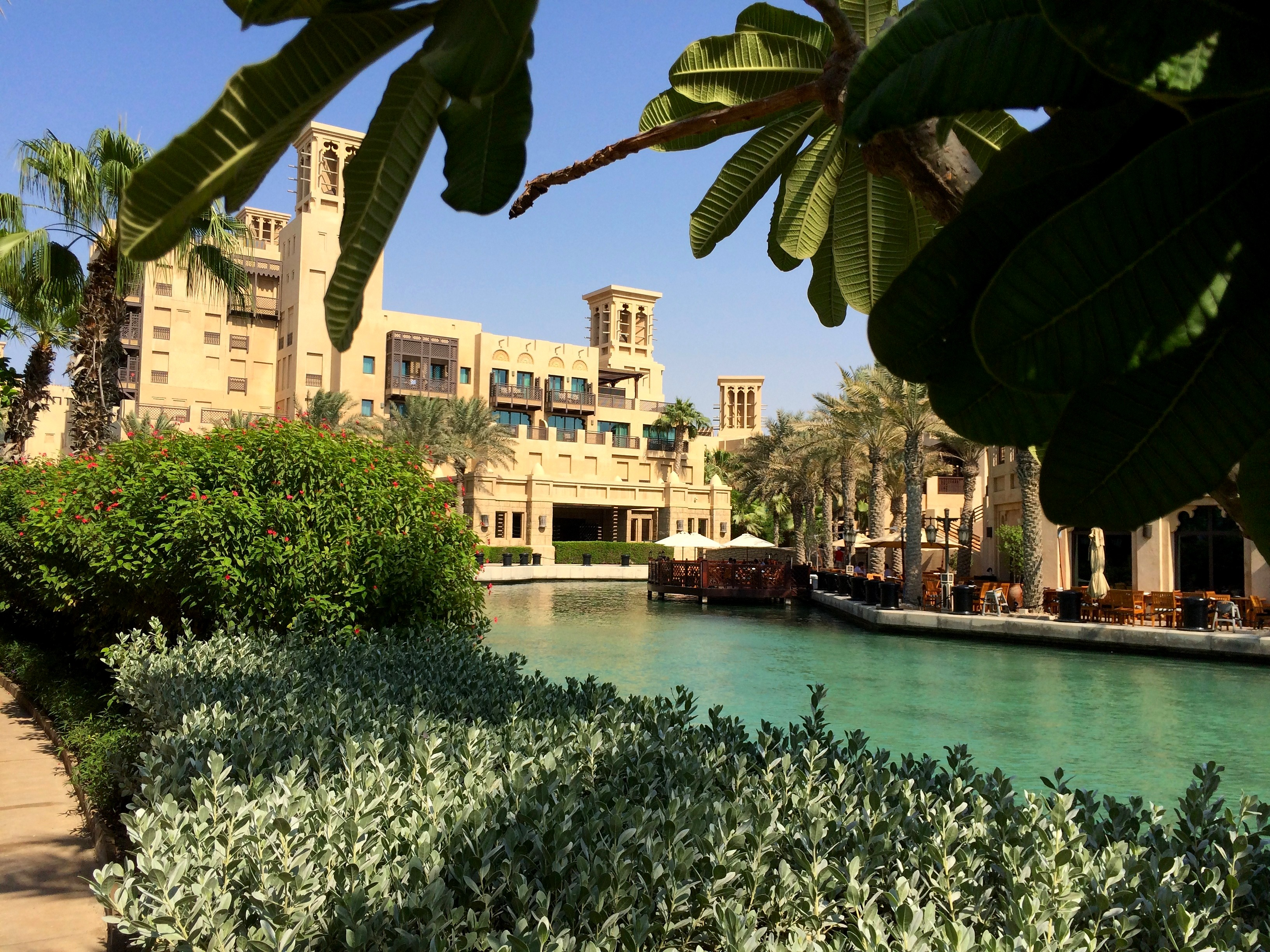

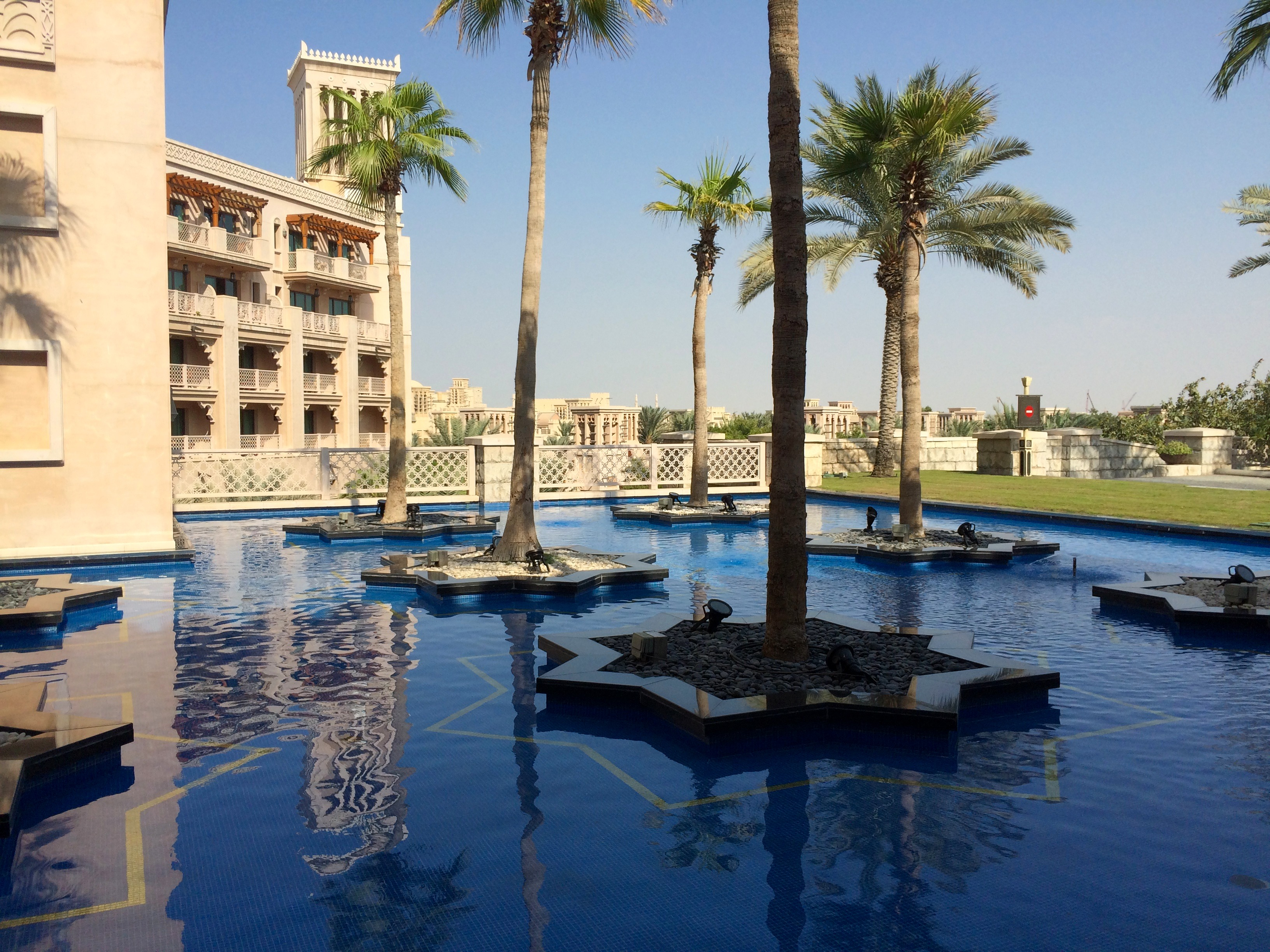

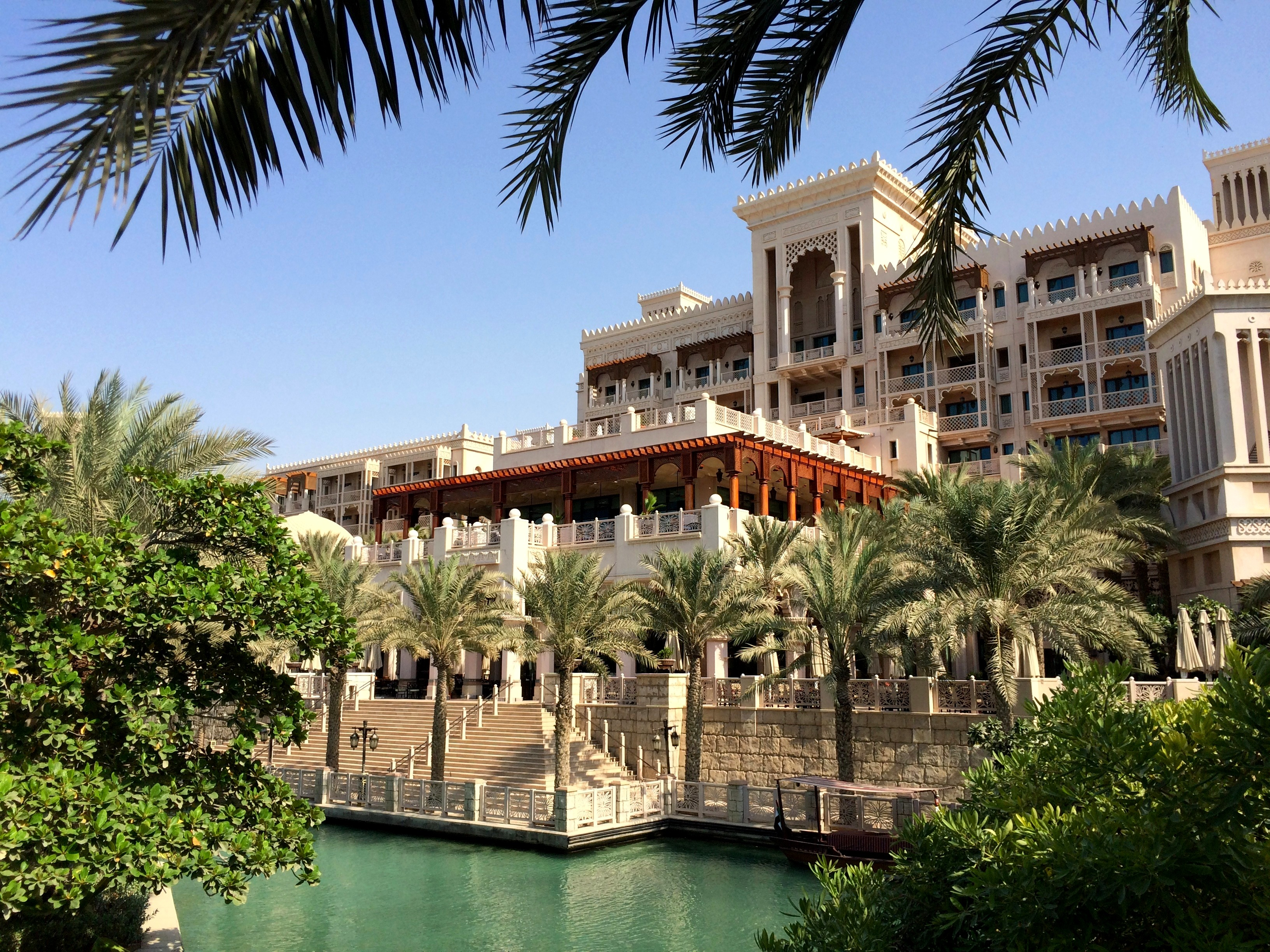

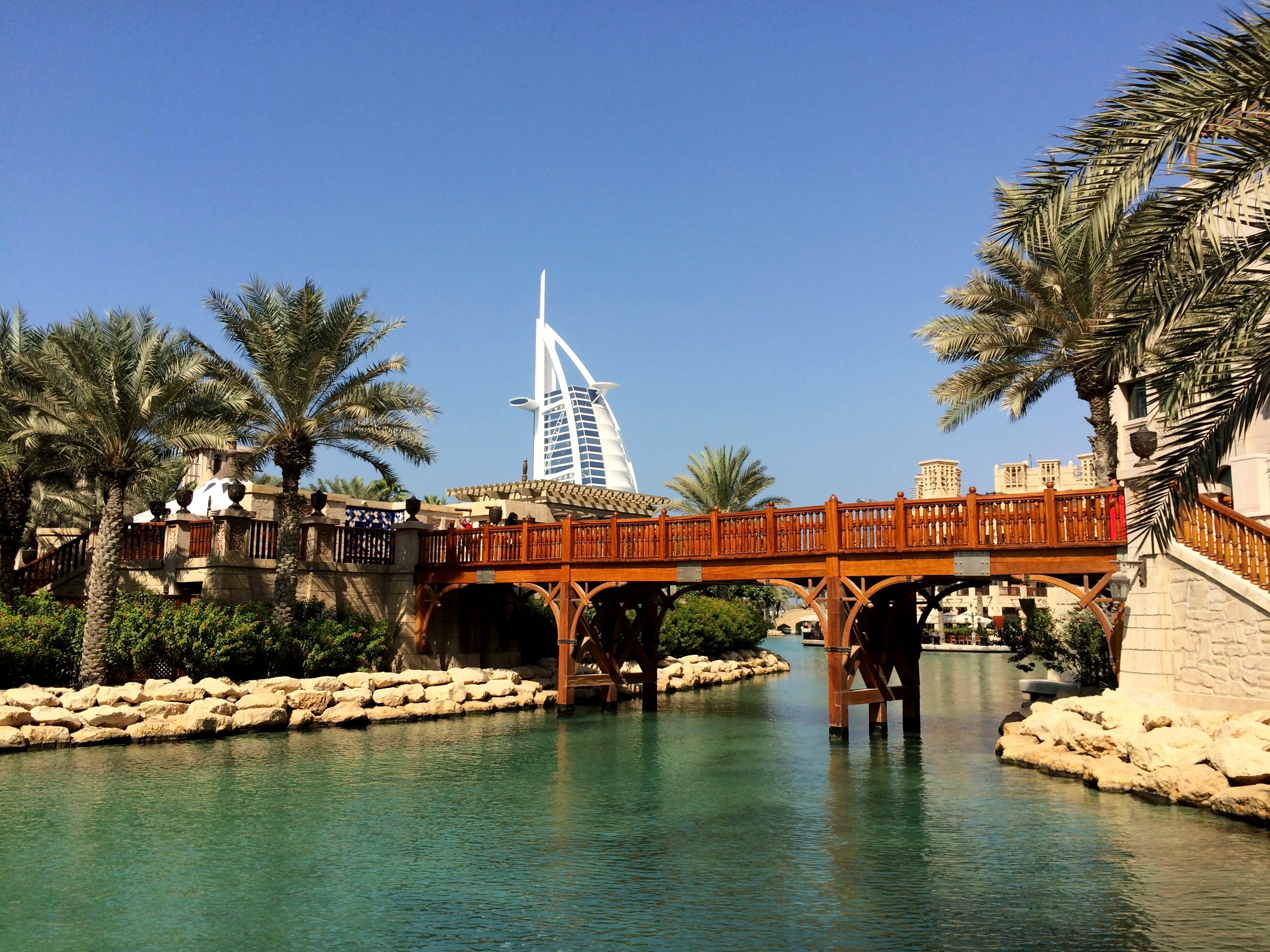

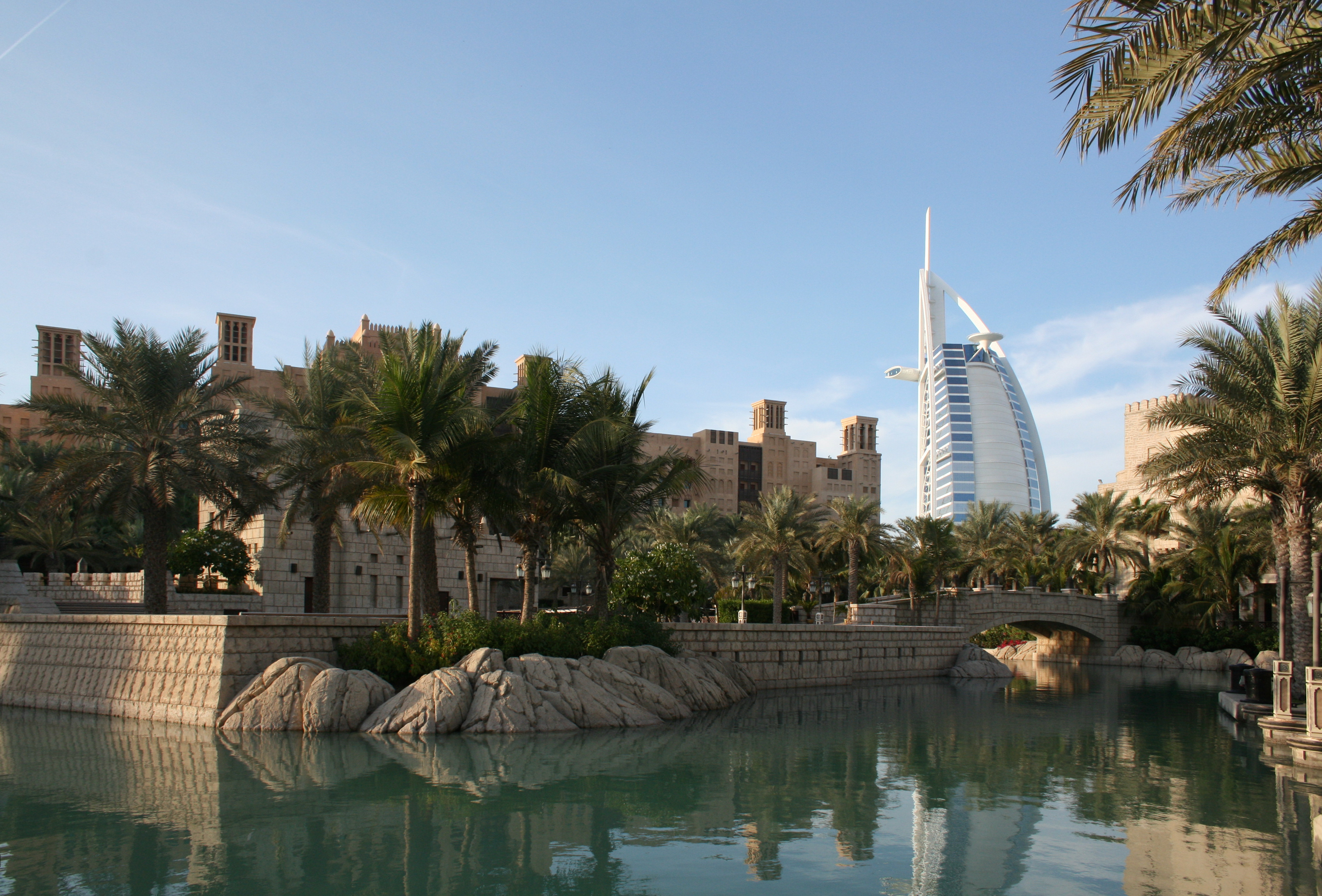

== See also ==
- List of buildings in Dubai
