= The Glorious Resolve =

2011 Pakistani documentary film

- Promotional poster
- Directed by: Brigadier Syed Mujtaba Tirmizi; Sarosh Kayani
- Written by: Lieutenant Colonel Irfan Aziz
- Produced by: Lieutenant Colonel Irfan Aziz; Brigadier Syed Azmat Ali
- Starring: Hamza Ali Abbasi; Hassan Waqas Rana; Bilal Lashari
- Production company: Inter-Services Public Relations
- Release date: 9 January 2011 (Pakistan)
- Country: Pakistan
- Language: Urdu

The Glorious Resolve: Death Before Disgrace is a 2011 Pakistani documentary film made by the Inter-Services Public Relations department of the Pakistan Armed Forces. The film stars Hamza Ali Abbasi, Hassan Waqas Rana and Bilal Lashari in leading roles. The executive director was Brig Syed Mujtaba Tirmizi, whereas it was written by Irfan Aziz. It was created specifically to counter Taliban and al-Qaeda propaganda videos by depicting the army and the fight against terror in a positive light.

Glorious Resolve won Jury special award in the recently held International film festival "Eserciti-e-Popoli" held at Bracciano, Italy. The festival saw the participation of NATO and 24 other countries with 60 films produced by renowned film makers which were evaluated by qualified and reputed jury. Glorious Resolve received the medal from the Chairman of the Italian Senate with the citation "A technically outstanding and emotionally powerful dramatization of the story of courageous soldier under fire in combat situation".

== Synopsis ==
The film tells the story of the heavily outnumbered infantry soldiers who fought off an assault by 1500 attackers who raided a section level outpost of an Infantry Battalion in South Waziristan Agency on the night of 29 May 2009. 43 Punjab jawans were killed in the battle, and their deaths are reenacted in the film, as well as the actions of two "Ghazis"—Sepoy Mashooq and Sepoy Muslim—who held their positions until reinforcements came. The film aims to depict the sacrifices and achievements of the Pakistan Army in the global war on terrorism as well as the Pakistan Army's "glorious resolve" to uproot the menace of terrorism from the "land of the pure".

== Cast ==
- Hamza Ali Abbasi
- Hassan Waqas Rana
- Bilal Lashari

== See also ==
- Inter-Services Public Relations media productions
- The Glorious Resolve (video game)
