= ARY Film Award for Best Makeup and Hairstyling =

Pakistani film award

- Country: Pakistan
- Presented by: ARY Digital Network and Entertainment Channel
- First award: 2014 (for the films released in 2013)
- Currently held by: Nabila Maqsood, Main Hoon Shahid Afridi (2013)
- Website: aryfilmawards.com

The ARY Film Award for Best Makeup and Hairstyling is an ARY Film Award that is awarded each year to the best Makeup artist. It is one of eleven Technical Awarding category.

== History ==
The Best Background Score category originates with the 1st ARY Film Awards ceremony in 2014. This category has been given to the best Makeup artist for his/her work for the films of the previous year to the ceremony held by Jury selection.

== Winners and Nominees ==
As of 2014, No nominations were made, winner selection and nomination were wholly made by AFAS Jury of Technical award.

=== 2010s ===
Year	Film	Makeup Artist(s)
2013 (1st)
2013 (1st)	Main Hoon Shahid Afridi	Nabila Maqsood
