= ARY Film Award for Best Screenplay =

Pakistani film award

ARY Film Award for Best Original Screenplay
- Awarded for: Best Original Screenplay of the year
- Country: Pakistan
- Presented by: ARY Digital Network and Entertainment Channel
- First award: 2014 (for the films released in 2013)
- Currently held by: Osman Khalid Butt; Siyaah (2013)
- Website: aryfilmawards.com

The ARY Film Award for Best Screenplay is the ARY Film Award for the best script not based upon previously published material. It is one of three writing awards in Technical Awarding category.

== History ==
The Best Screenplay category originates with the 1st ARY Film Awards ceremony since 2014. This category has been given to the best Screenplays for the films of previous year to the ceremony held by Jury selection.

== Winners and nominees ==
As of 2014, No nominations were made, winner selection and nomination were wholly made by AFAS Jury of Technical award.

=== 2010s ===
Year	Film	Screenwriter(s)
2013 (1st)
2013 (1st)	Siyaah	Osman Khalid Butt
