= ARY Film Awards =

Pakistani film awards ceremony

- Current: 2nd ARY Film Awards
- ARY Film Awards Statue
- Awarded for: Excellence in cinematic achievements.
- Sponsored by: Nokia, ZONG and L'Oréal
- Country: Pakistan
- Presented by: ARY Digital Network and Entertainment Channel
- First award: 27 April 2014; 28 May 2014 (televised)
- Website: aryfilmawards.com

Television/radio coverage
- Network: ARY Digital

The ARY Film Awards (Urdu: ARY فلم انعام), commonly known as The AFA's, is an annual Pakistani awards ceremony honoring the cinematic achievements of film industry. Winners are awarded the golden statue, officially the ARY Film Award of Merit, that is much often known as an AFA trophy. The awards, first presented in 2014 at Golf Club, Karachi, are overseen and organized by ARY Digital Network and Entertainment Channel. ARY Film Awards became an electoral race to the trophy to best film in any category, as per being the first awarding ceremony of reboot era of Pakistani Film Industry. ARY Film Awards are the first film awarding ceremony after the demolishing of Pakistani oldest awarding ceremony Nigar Awards.

ARY Film Awards are the effort of ARY Groups CEO Salman Iqbal who laid the foundation of ARY Films, which proves enormous beneficial for the Pakistani Film Industry and henceforth generate the new face of Pakistani Cinema in 2013. In result ARY Awards marked the milestone of supporting the efforts of artists across the country. The awards are reputed as annual event of ARY Digital Network to honor the actors, technical achievements and films of Pakistan. Award has been given in more than a dozen categories rendered into three major segments Viewers Choice, Jury Choice and Technical Awards.

The 2nd ARY Film Awards took place in Dubai, UAE on 16 April 2016.

In 2026, the ARY Film Awards were forced to be postponed due to security threats.

== History ==
ARY Group is a well-known holding company founded by known businessman Abdul Razzak Yaqoob, thus representing the acronym of his name ARY which later became the first name of each subsidiary that comes in Group. ARY is a diversified group with interests in several sectors, though it is most famous for its contribution to Pakistani television. Its TV company ARY Digital Network and Entertainment Channel which further holds five television channels is one of highly rated TV Network in Pakistan. With the success in television, ARY Digital inaugurates ARY Films a film distribution company, which proves magnificently beneficial in terms of the arise of Pakistani cinema and money making. Year 2013, mark the milestone of the rebirth of Pakistan after a decade, hence generating another brick in great dome, ARY Film Awards were presented in order to honor the achievements of cinematic industry which had lost the charm years ago.

First ceremony was presented at Golf club of Defense Housing Authority in Karachi attended by the audience of more than 700 people including celebrities. Thirty three awards were presented, honoring artists, directors and other personalities of the film-making industry of the time for their works during the 2013 period; the ceremony ran for 3 hours and 45 minutes.

The ceremony was held in late April and broadcast a recorded telecast in late May. Special presenters are usually lined-up in a pair or single individual to present the awards to winners, presenters themselves was nominated and were media personalities. ARY used the sealed envelope to reveal the name of the winners.

The first Best Actor decided by Jury was given to Humayun Saeed and Best Actor decided by Viewers was presented to Shaan Shahid, for their work in Main Hoon Shahid Afridi and Waar respectively, this made them the first ARY Award winner in history. The honored professionals were awarded for all the work done in a certain category for the qualifying period; for example, Humayun and Shaan received their award for movies in which they starred during that period.

First ceremony was hosted by multiple hosts, with Shaan and Ayesha Omer were main host of the ceremony while Fahad Mustafa, Sarwat Gilani and Hamza Ali Abbasi hosted different segments.

== ARY Films and Motto ==
Cinema and Film making in Pakistan makes an enormous hit comeback in the year 2013, with the name like Revisiting the death and Revival of Pakistani Cinema and phrases like New-wave, rebirth and revival become the tagline of every event that held in Pakistani Film Industry. Release of around seven Pakistani films throughout the country gave a much-needed push to aspiring local film-makers, it also produced a hyper-sentimental wave about the rise of Pakistan cinema, which masked the realities on the ground. The current year holds more promise for Pakistani cinema as more than two dozen productions are reportedly on the floor.

ARY Digital Network and Entertainment Channel joins hand with many film ventures and give birth to the new subsidiary to entire Group ARY Films, which mark the new milestone in Pakistani cinema foundation. ARY Films release thirty five films including 11 Urdu, 6 Punjabi and 17 Pashto films. Among them Waar, Main Hoon Shahid Afridi, Josh, Chambaili, Zinda Bhaag, Siyaah and Lamha tops the charts in industry and collects splendid box office performances on domestically and internationally. To celebrate the success of Pakistani cinema, ARY Films inaugurated First Film Awarding Ceremony after the demolishing of Nigar Awards, with the motto of "Celebrating the New Face of Cinema" to honor the films from all over the Pakistan, actors and technical achievements.

== AFA's Statuette ==
=== Design ===
ARY Film trophy is known as ARY Film Award of Merit and recently it is also referred as AFA's trophy. It is Made of gold-plated britannium on a black metal base, it is 11 in (27.94 cm) tall, weighs 6.5 lb (2.94 kg) and depicts a gold-lady rendered in Art Deco style turned into curve style making ovule shape above her head by joining hands standing on a reel of film with presenter's name. The presenter name represent organization logo and respective winner field and name. As of first ceremony a total of 33 AFA's trophies have been presented to artists.

=== Naming ===
AFA's statute is named after the ARY Group's co-founder Abdul Razzak Yaqoob, which is known as acronym "ARY". This acronym serve as a company logo and its all subsidiaries. Hence ARY Films which generates the idea of "ARY Film Awards" which further shortened to "AFA", first letter of each word (Abdul Razzak Yaqoob), thus naming the AFA's Trophy or simply AFA.

== Nominations ==
Since 2014, with ceremony inception Nomination results have been announced to public in early April, prior to the ceremony that held late in the same month and televises late in next month.

=== Voters ===
ARY presents Awards in three sections decided by their respective Jury:

- Jury Choice Awards
- Viewers Choice Awards
- Technical Awards

ARY Digital Network and Entertainment Channel, a collective name for ARY Group maintains the massive voting membership. Each section has its own jury, for the selection of nominations.

For the Jury Choice category, winners are conclude only in four major categories, Best Film, Best Director, Best Actor and Best Actress, without considering any nominations and voting criteria is totally dependent upon the selected Jury of ARY Group. However this category is made to avoid the biased results which can may occur in Public voting.

Similarly the Technical Awards, all the categories are proposed and voted by relevant Jury of this section, and winners are concluded by Jury selection without considering any nominations.

Viewers Choice categories are the most eye-catching awards that are presented on the basis of public voting. Nominations are made by AFA's special Jury, total of fourteen viewers choice awards are given by public voting. All of four Jury awards are also awarded in Viewers category, so they can vote according to their favorite work and artist. As of first ceremony Public voting's are done through text messages or by going on ceremony official website.

=== Rules ===
As per the rules of AFA, a film must open in the previous calendar year, from midnight at the start of 1 January to midnight at the end of 31 December, in karachi or Lahore, Pakistan to qualify, e.g.; if a movie released in 2010 and did not play its AFA's-qualifying run in Pakistan will not be qualify for 2010 awards until its completes its screening to qualify for next ceremony.

As per rule, Film must be feature-length, defined as a minimum of 40 minutes and it must exist either on a 35 mm film or 70 mm film print or in 24 frame/s or 48 frame/s progressive scan digital cinema format with native resolution not less than 1280x720.

Producers of the films must summit their Official Screen Credits for film before the deadline, in order to get nomination if respective film gets nomination in Best Film category. This rule states the original and credited producers selection of a film by an AFA.

== Ceremony ==
=== Telecast ===
All the awards are presented in a ceremony between February and May and usually telecast after a month, following the relevant calendar year, and two weeks after the announcements of Viewers choice nominees. It is the culmination of the film awards season, which usually begins during November or December of the previous year. This is an elaborate extravaganza, with the invited guests walking up the red carpet in the creations of the most prominent fashion designers of the day. Black tie dress is the most common outfit for men, although fashion may dictate not wearing a bow-tie, and musical performers sometimes do not adhere to this, while for women casual to formal dress is the most common outfit.

The ARY Film Awards, like others (Lux, Hum and PMA's) are not a live televised ceremony, due to management and telecast restrictions. The Award show is broadcast on the ceremony presenter's own channel ARY Digital and will be televised on the same network in the future.

First ceremony was held on Sunday 8:00 p.m. PST/UTC+5, and Televised on Saturday after 27 days of the actual ceremony event at 8:00 p.m. PST/UTC+5. In terms of broadcast length, the ceremony generally averages three and a half hours. The first ARY Film Awards, lasted 3 hours and 45 minutes. At the other end of the spectrum. Including the thanking clips of winners before the break.

=== Venue ===
As of 2014, first ceremony were held at Golf Club, DHA Phase VIII, Karachi in an open ground. In spite of other awarding ceremonies that are usually held at expo centers of Karachi and Lahore. Ceremony usually hold a Red carpet at ceremony sie before the entrance to venue place. For 2016 ceremony that will honor the films of 2015, is scheduled to take place on 18 February 2016, in Dubai, UAE.

== Award ceremonies ==
ARY film Award ceremony become most awaited ceremony of the year after Lux Style Awards. ARY is currently the only Pakistani awarding ceremony that honors film achievements only after Nigar Awards. Other awarding ceremonies host many other sections of showbiz. The "Afascast" has pulled in a bigger haul when box-office hits are favored to win the Best Film trophy. More than 15 million viewers turned to the telecast for the first ceremony in 2014, the year of Waar, which generated Rs. 9 million at Pakistani Box Office before the ceremony. Waar became the highest-grossing movie of Pakistan, and won 13 awards among its 19 nominations including Best Film decided by Public.

With the revival of cinema ARY Film Ceremony regarded as most important ceremony that honor the cinematic achievements and artist of showbiz. In a country like Pakistan where cinema and movie making are on the least edge of showbiz, holding such ceremony generates the new wave of the Pakistani cinema. ARY film awards became the most expensive ceremony that ever held in Pakistan with the cost of Rs. 80 million. No ceremony was held for 2014 film year.

== Merit categories ==
Following is the listing of ARY Film Awards Merit categories since 2014.

=== Current categories ===
==== Jury's Choice Awards ====
- Best Actor in a Leading Role Jury
- Best Actress in a Leading Role Jury
- Best Director Jury
- Best Film Jury

==== Viewer's Choice Awards ====
- Best Actor in a Leading Role
- Best Actor in a Supporting Role
- Best Actress in a Leading Role
- Best Actress in a Supporting Role
- Best Actor in Comic Role
- Best Actor in Negative Role
- Best Director
- Best Film
- Best Female Playback Singer
- Best Independent Film
- Best Male Playback Singer
- Best Original Music
- Best Star Debut Male
- Best Star Debut Female

==== Technical awards ====
- Best Action
- Best Background Score
- Best Choreography
- Best Cinematography
- Best Costume Design
- Best Dialogue
- Best Editing
- Best Makeup and Hairstyling
- Best Story
- Best Screenplay
- Best Special Effects

As of first ceremony, awarding sections were rendered into three major categories among them Four most highlighted award are presented by only ARY Jury, in order to avoid the biased selection, all of four jury awards are simultaneously also awarded in Viewers category, where winners are concluded on the basis of public selection. Only Jury Awards categories has a superfix of Jury as they specially awarded, while Viewers awards are simply named and mention. Best Original Music and Best Makeup and Hairstyling categories are also simply known as Best Music and Best Makeup respectively.

== Special categories ==
The Special ARY Film Awards are voted on by special committees, rather than by the ARY Film membership as a whole. They are not always presented on a consistent annual basis.

=== Current special categories ===
- ARY Film Honorary Lifetime Achievement Award.
- ARY Film Honorary Award for Contributing Pakistani Cinema.
- ARY Film Honorary International Icon Award.
- ARY Film Honorary Award for Special Contributing to film industry via theaters.

As of first ceremony total of four special awards were presented, in the following year it will be clear that which of the above currently presented award will continue to be given. ARY Film Honorary Award for Special Contributing via theaters is one of the most special awards which is presented only at first ceremony and was given a special ARY token of screening ARY Films to the film theaters of Pakistan instead of AFA's trophy.

== Critical response and review ==
ARY Film Awards met with huge success and response, because of the no such films awards ever held on such grounds in country. ARY Awards were also praised because of their collaboration with many other film companies to help in rebuilding the Pakistani cinema once again. Many critics and bloggers praises ARY Digital Network such step of introducing Pakistan's "first ever film awards" after the demolishing of country's oldest awarding ceremony Nigar awards which was demolished after 2001 due to the box office failure of film industry and lack of good films. Afterwards Lux Style Awards replaced Nigar but Lux brought different categories of show business under one name and it continue to do so for 12 years and currently entering in its 13th year, but never recognized as film awards. But with the success of ARY Films, ARY Film Awards was also a huge success and recognized as an only film awards of Pakistan. With such response founder of ARY Network Slaman Iqbal said:

As far as films is concerned, I would like to say that it is our mission to take things forward one step at a time. Last year we presented some great movies and this year we are creating a platform where great movies will be appreciated. I think that Pakistan has lost many years as far as the development of the film industry is concerned so we must all join hands and take out talent of our industry to where the international films and global cinema stand today.

While CEO and President of ARY Network Jerjees Seja said:

Another milestone is going to be achieved by the Pakistan's film industry with ARY Film Awards. It is a matter of pride for us that we are creating another platform to appreciate the talent of Pakistan and motivate the young and creative to make more films next year and keep the ball rolling.

At the first ceremony Shaan and Ali Zafar were in off-and-on stage fight of words, where Shaan indirectly criticized Ali and other artists for not believing in Pakistani cinema and work across the borders, when Ali was given honorary International Icon award. Audience and critics favored Shaan as they describe that Shaan stood first with industry in time of hour in sprite he was offered many films across the border and internationally, but he refused to regenerates the Pakistan film industry. Salman Iqbal's ARY Films and Shaan's Riaz Ahmad Productions join hand to bear the torch in Pakistan Film Industry's quest for its revived future. Riaz Shahid Films will produce four films every year from the next year making sure that there is always enough local content for cinemas to exhibit, whereas ARY Films will make sure that the films receive the grandest reception in the country possible.

== Associated events ==
Following events are closely associated with the annual ARY Awards:

- Red Carpet Ceremony
- Making of Ceremony

== Winner gifts ==
It has been a tradition to give out gifts bags to the winners of their respective category. The assortment of gifts does not varies significantly, usually with the AFA's trophy winners were given out Nokia phones as Nokia serve as a main sponsor for the ceremony.

== See also ==
- ARY Film Awards pre-show
- Hum Awards
- Lux Style Awards
- Nigar Awards
- Pakistan Media Awards
- International Pakistan Prestige Awards
