= Halla Gulla =

2015 Pakistani romantic comedy film

- Theatrical release poster
- ہلہ گلہ
- Directed by: Kamran Akbar Khan
- Screenplay by: Kamran Akbar Khan
- Story by: Raheela Mushtaq Shah
- Produced by: Hanif Mohammad
- Starring: Asim Mehmood; Sidra Batool; Hina Rizvi
- Edited by: Nasir Inayat
- Music by: Sahir Ali Bagga
- Production company: S.E Films
- Distributed by: IMGC Global Entertainment; Geo Films
- Release date: 25 September 2015
- Country: Pakistan
- Language: Urdu

Halla Gulla is a 2015 Pakistani romantic comedy film directed by Kamran Akbar Khan and produced by Hanif Mohammad under the production banner S.E. Films. The film stars Javed Sheikh, Ismail Tara, Asim Mehmood, and Sidra Batool in lead along with Muneeb Butt, Ghazala Javed, Ashraf Khan, Adil Wadia, Zara Gull, Jasmeen, Maryam Ansari, Hina Rizvi, Hunain Maniar and Bilal Yousufzai.

The film was distributed by IMGC Global Entertainment and Geo Films and launched on 25 September 2015 (Eid al-adha) in cinemas nationwide.

== Cast ==
- Asim Mehmood as Saahil
- Sidra Batool as Muskarahat
- Muneeb Butt as Udaas
- Javed Sheikh as Golden Bhai (DON)
- Ismail Tara
- Ghazala Javed
- Ashraf Khan
- Zara Gul
- Jasmeen
- Adil Wadia
- Maryam Ansari
- Hina Rizvi as Chatpati
- Hunain Maniar

== Release ==
The film was scheduled to release on 28 August 2015, but later it was postponed for 25 September 2015 (Eid al-adha) release along with Jawani Phir Nahi Ani.

=== Marketing ===
The first look posters of film were revealed on 11 November 2014. Video of item song titled Ishq Kamla was released on 23 November on YouTube. Theatrical trailer and poster was revealed on 3 June 2015 but after rescheduling of film release date, new poster was revealed on 4 September. Title song of the film was released by 8XM on 7 September at 6:21 pm. The film cast visited several private universities to promote the film.

== Soundtrack ==
- "Halla Gulla" – Sahir Ali Bagga, Kunal Ganjawala, Beena Khan
- "Saroor De" – Afshan Fawad, Rahat Fateh Ali Khan
- "Thumka" – Sana Zulfiqar, Kunal Ganjawala, Sahir Ali Bagga
- "Kamla" – Sana Zulfiqar
- "Zero Meter" - Sana Zulfiqar, Malko

== See also ==
- List of Pakistani films of 2015
