= Shah (film) =

- Theatrical release poster
- Directed by: Adnan Sarwar
- Written by: Adnan Sarwar
- Starring: Sardar Baloch; Gulab Chandio; Kiran Chaudhry; Faiz Chohan; Adnan Sarwar; Miraal Sara; Adeel Wali Raees
- Cinematography: Omar Daraz; Syed M.Hassan Zaidi
- Edited by: Tahir Ali
- Music by: Adnan Sarwar; Farhan Albert
- Production companies: Logos Films & Media
- Distributed by: ARY Films; Footprint Entertainment
- Release date: 13 August 2015 (Pakistan)
- Country: Pakistan
- Language: Urdu
- Budget: Rs. 1.25 crore (US$45,000)
- Box office: Rs. 1.02 crore (US$36,000)

Shah is a 2015 Pakistani biographical sports film directed and written by Adnan Sarwar. The film, produced under the Logos Films & Media banner, is based on the life of boxer Hussain Shah, who won the bronze medal at the 1988 Summer Olympics and became the first Pakistani boxer to secure an Olympic medal. Sarwar underwent one year of boxing training to portray Hussain Shah. Other roles are portrayed by Kiran Chaudhary, Sardar Baloch, Adeel Wali Raees, and Gulab Chandio.

The film was released nationwide by Footprint Entertainment and ARY Films on 13 August 2015.

== Plot ==
The film is based on the journey of Pakistani Olympian boxer Hussain Shah, who started his life on the streets of Lyari, Karachi as a homeless child and went on to dominate Asian boxing for nearly a decade. He became the only boxer of Pakistan history to win an Olympic medal at the 1988 Seoul Olympics but was afterwards forgotten by public and media alike.

== Cast ==
- Adnan Sarwar as Hussain Shah
- Sardar Baloch
- Gulab Chandio
- Kiran Chaudhry
- Faiz Chohan
- Miraal Sara Intesar
- Adeel Wali Raees

== Production ==
Pre-production of film began in August 2013 and filming started that autumn. The lead actor had to go through a yearlong boxing programme to prepare for the role. He commented about it: "I lived and breathed boxing. I had to go through functional resistance training and running in the morning and boxing drills in the evening with very little intake of food. It was tough." The film production took place in Pakistan. The production team claimed that they raised Rs. 2 million, saying "We’ve raised that 2 million and are going to give it to him because that’s a debt we owe him as a nation." Adnan Sarwar has also set up a boxing scholarship for Lyari's street kids, who are part of the film’s cast.

=== Marketing ===
The film's cast and crew were revealed on 5 June 2015 in a teaser poster which also revealed film sponsors Bank Alfalah, Pepsi, and Samsung. The theatrical trailer was released on 1 July. Ali Zafar and Amir Khan invited people to watch this film in cinemas.

The Director of the film Adnan Sarwar said in an Interview "We had nothing but a five member team, a low budget camera and a Laptop on the sets of the film".He also urged the Pakistani people to go and watch the film and promote their efforts.

== Release ==
Initially, the film was set to release on 14 August but later it was rescheduled to be released a day earlier to have a four-day opening weekend. It premiered in Karachi on 13 August.

== Reception ==
=== Box office ===
The film collected Rs. 3 million (US$11,000) on its first day taking three days opening weekend collection to Rs. 6 million (US$21,000). The film collected Rs. 7.3 million (US$26,000) at the end of first week. The film had a decent 2nd weekend at box office collecting Rs. 1.2 million (US$4,300) and taking total to Rs. 8.5 million (US$30,000). It faced competition from Dekh Magar Pyar Se and Moor, earning more than the former but less than the latter. By the end of its run, Shah was unable to earn more than its budget.

=== Critical response ===
The film had mostly positive reviews. Immediately upon its release, Twitter was abuzz with praise for Shah by industry professionals and general public. Cultural critic Nadeem Farooq Paracha wrote, "Watched Shah. Highly impressed. The film throws some truly powerful punches in all departments. Inspirational stuff...must Watch". Madeeha Syed of Dawn praised Sarwar's performance noting "What’s refreshing about Adnan Sarwar as a method actor is that he as celebrity is not present in the film, the character he plays is.. Soon you forget that it’s Adnan playing a role, because in the film, he is Shah". Shafiq ul Hassan of The Express Tribune Blogs rated the film 2.5 out of 5 stars and wrote "Overall, even though the message of the movie was very strong, it lacked the finishing touches required to make a film go all the way." Shahjahan Khurram of ARY News wrote "All in all, Shah is a must watch which will guarantee you your money’s worth and is indeed a quality-oriented film." Galaxy Lollywood's Zeeshan Mahmood gave it a 3.5 out of 5, praising its music, acting and directing. But also stated that its editing lacked some finishing touches and could not reach its potential due to its limited budget and inexperienced team. Hip in Pakistan's Wajiha Jawaid was full of praise in her final verdict and wrote,"Shah is a must watch and will make you fall in love with Pakistan once again with its flawlessly executed script, the many patriotic moments, and fabulous performances by the entire cast."

== Awards and nominations ==
Awards
Award	Category	Name	Outcome
2016 ARY Film Awards	Best Actor	Adnan Sarwar	Nominated
2016 ARY Film Awards	Best Director	Adnan Sarwar	Nominated
2016 ARY Film Awards	Best Debut Male	Adnan Sarwar	Nominated
2016 ARY Film Awards	Best Screenplay	Adnan Sarwar	Nominated
2016 ARY Film Awards	Best Background Score	Adnan Sarwar and Farhan Albert	Nominated
2016 ARY Film Awards	Best Editing & VFX	Tahir Ali	Nominated
2016 Lux Style Awards	Best Film	Shah	Nominated
2016 Lux Style Awards	Best Film Actor	Adnan Sarwar	Nominated
2016 Lux Style Awards	Best Film Director	Adnan Sarwar	Nominated

== Release on Youtube ==
The film has been uploaded on YouTube by the Filmmaker on 21 May 2016. The reasons were stated to avoid piracy and increase the longevity of the film.

== See also ==
- List of Pakistani films of 2015
- List of boxing films
