= Jalaibee =

- Theatrical release poster
- Directed by: Yasir Jaswal
- Written by: Yasir Jaswal
- Produced by: Eman Syed
- Starring: Danish Taimoor; Sajid Hasan; Adnan Jaffar; Sabeeka Imam; Zhalay Sarhadi; Ali Safina; Waqar Ali Khan; Uzair Jaswal; Salmaan Shaukat
- Edited by: Rizwan AQ
- Music by: Abbas Ali Khan
- Production companies: REDRUM Films; ARY Films
- Distributed by: ARY Films
- Release date: 20 March 2015
- Running time: 117 min
- Country: Pakistan
- Language: Urdu
- Box office: PKR 28.30 Crore

Jalaibee (Urdu: جلیبی, romanized: jalēbī, lit. 'twist') is a 2015 Pakistani caper action thriller film directed and written by Yasir Jaswal, and produced by Eman Syed. Jalaibee is a joint production of ARY Films & Redrum Films in association with Sermad Films and Jaswal Films. The film stars prominent TV actors Danish Taimoor and Ali Safina in lead roles along with Adnan Jaffar, Sajid Hasan, Uzair Jaswal, Wiqar Ali Khan, Sabeeka Imam and Zhalay Sarhadi.

It is the first Pakistani film to be shot with an Arri Alexa camera. The film is shot in the federal capital Islamabad, and provincial capitals Lahore and Karachi. Jalaibee features Ford Mustang 73 in the film as well as its mascot. It is about the intertwined stories of numerous relatable characters who are all struggling with their problems, and who somehow connect on a unifying level.

The film focuses on several parallel sub-plots. In one of them, two orphans plan a casino heist in order to pay their debts to a local mafia organization. In another sub-plot, a mafia don is targeted by a revenge plot, and his front man has to decide how to handle the situation without losing his own influence. In a third sub-plot, an aspiring politician is preoccupied with the upcoming elections, and he consequently ignores his daughter's efforts to inform him about her love life.

== Plot ==
Jalaibee's story revolves around two orphaned friends Billu and Bugga who get tangled up in a debt with the local mafia called The Unit. As they look for ways to pay the debt before The Unit comes to collect, they find out they are in deeper waters than they thought. Thinking of different ways to pay the debt, they stumble upon an idea to rob a local casino. To execute this heist, they enlist the help of a bar dancer named Banno to seduce to the owner of the casino.

At the same time, another man Ali, along with his brother and partner, Jimmy, wants revenge against The King, a mafia don who killed his father and forced his mother to commit suicide when he was young. The King's front man Dara is caught between collecting the debt and handling the kidnapping while retaining fear and control over the city.

Simultaneously, Eman, the daughter of wealthy industrialist and contender for the Prime Minister's seat, Akbar Chaudhary, is trying to talk to her father about Ali, her beau. This proves to be difficult with the election coming closer by the day.

== Cast ==
- Danish Taimoor as Billu
- Ali Safina as Bugga
- Waqar Ali Khan as Ali
- Zhalay Sarhadi as Bunno
- Sajid Hasan as Akbar
- Sabeeka Imam as Eman
- Adnan Jaffar as Dara
- Uzair Jaswal as Jimmy
- Salman Shaukat as Imran
- Humaira Asghar as Model

== Production ==
=== Casting ===
In interview with The National, director said: "The casting was done with my casting director Ehtesham Ansari, who has also styled everyone in the film. There were a couple of people I had in mind when I was writing every character. Some of them didn’t work out, some did. One who did work out was Ali Safeena, who plays Bugga. He is the narrator of the story and I could always see him as Bugga. I knew from the start that I didn’t want any big names in my film. It’s not to take anything away from them, but I wanted to broaden the horizon a bit. We have a lot of talented actors and actresses who never get a chance to appear on the big screen because not that many films are being made."

=== Filming ===
Jalaibee is produced by Eman Bente Syed of Sermad Films and the executive producer of the film is Murtaza Shah of Redrum Films. Shooting started in the summer 2013 in Islamabad and it took to Karachi after finishing the Lahore shoot. Film production designers Nida Akbar Khan and Khurram Syed designed set worth Rs. 7 million for Jalaibee in Eastern Studios Karachi and Ever New Studios, Lahore where the film's last few scenes and a song were filmed. Sets were constructed by Aqeel ur Rehman of Set & Act. The film shooting session ended in September 2014. The film was shot using an Arri Alexa which was used to shoot blockbuster films like Gravity, Skyfall and Iron Man 3 were shot. Jalaibee is part animated film, edited by Rizwan AQ, artwork of which is illustrated by Babrus Khan in Lahore. VFX of the film is done by a London based Sharp Image.

=== Marketing ===
On 2 December 2013 first look poster was unveiled featuring Ford Mustang 73 and announcing teaser's release date. The teaser trailer of the film was released on 25 December 2013 on ARY Digital Network, film's official Facebook page and on vimeo by Jaswal Films simultaneously. The teaser was also played on big screen at 1st ARY Film Awards where Jalaibee team including Waqar Ali Khan, Ali Safina, Uzair Jaswal, Sabeeka Imam, Zhalay Sarhadi, and Asal Din Khan given the introduction of film. On 16 October 2014 second title poster was released on Danish Taimoor's Facebook page and later on film's page. On 23 January 2015 final poster was revealed along with film's release date followed by character posters in the same week. On Januar 31, 2015 theatrical trailer was unveiled on official Facebook and on channels run by ARY Digital Network. In February, Malik Riaz of Bahria Town joined ARY Films to revive Pakistani cinema by announcing a reward for those, coming to watch Jalaibee. Founder and CEO of ARY Digital Salman Iqbal revealed that Malik Riaz has purchased 10,000 tickets of Jalaibee for residents of Bahria Town giving film a kick start of Rs 5 million before it release.

== Music ==
Jalaibee

Soundtrack album by Abbas Ali Khan
- Released: 26 March 2015
- Genre: Film score
- Length: 27:59
- Label: EMI Pakistan

The soundtrack features 9 tracks by various artists including Qayaas, Uzair Jaswal and Humaira Arshad, only one of them is performed in film while others are used as a background score which was composed by Abbas Ali Khan. Song Jee Raha written & composed by Umair Jaswal and Sarmad Ghafoor was released on 18 March 2015 whereas film's soundtrack album was released on 26 March by EMI Pakistan.

No.	Title	Lyrics	Music	Singer(s)	Length
1.	"Upside Down" (Intro music)		Kostal		1:10
2.	"Come Get Some"			Shizzio	3:32
3.	"Jee Raha"	Umair Jaswal		Umair Jaswal	4:13
4.	"Jalaibee" (Title song)			Umair Jaswal	2:52
5.	"Jhoom Baraber"				4:55
6.	"Daaru Di Bottal"		East Side Story		3:36
7.	"Qatil Akh"		East Side Story		3:22
8.	"Jawani" (Item song)	Shuja Haider	Shuja Haider		3:27
9.	"Jhooti"				0:54
Total length:					27:59

== Release ==
On 26 December 2013 an agreement was signed between Redrum Films and ARY Films for film distribution. As per distributor ARY Films, film was announced to release in summer season 2014, but for a reason it was postponed for 2015 release. Explaining the reason for the delay, director said "The production team had run out of funds and the reason behind releasing the teaser was strategic. Wanting to get financers on board, we worked on the pre-production of the film quite extensively, which resulted in delay of the film’s release." On 23 January 2015 ARY Films announced to release the film on 20 March 2015 across Pakistan, U.K and U.S.A simultaneously.

== Reception ==
=== Box office ===
The film collected Rs. 5 million (US$18,000) before its release and became first of Pakistani films to do so because property person Malik Riaz bought 10,000 tickets for the Bahria Town residents to watch Jalaibee in cinemas. Movie had good number of public previews on Thursday and came out well on them collecting Rs. 1 million (US$3,600) which is biggest preview collections ever in Pakistan. Movie opened very well on Friday with day one being 7th biggest ever and 2nd biggest for Pakistani movies as movie collected Rs. 1.02 crore (US$36,000). Movie grew around 10% on Day two collecting Rs. 1.11 crore (US$40,000) with best growth in Karachi and Islamabad. Movie collected Rs. 1.15 crore (US$41,000) on Sunday taking 3 Day Weekend to Rs. 3.38 crore (US$120,000). Film had national Holiday on Monday but movie couldn't sustain as figures went down to Rs. 0.72 crore (US$26,000) taking 4 Day Extended Weekend to Rs. 4.1 crore (US$150,000).Film fell further on Tuesday as it was first non-Holiday Weekday of film. Film had low yet steady Weekdays taking Week One total to Rs. 5.01 crore (US$180,000).Film held best in Karachi over Weekdays. After low Weekdays film needed massive growth over 2nd Weekend to ensure good run at boxoffice but movie fell around 65% and grossed Rs. 1.1 crore (US$39,000) in its 2nd Weekend.Film had fallen in Karachi also which was holding best over first Week's Weekdays. 10 Days total stood at Rs. 6.11 crore (US$220,000). The film collected around Rs. 7.50 crore (US$270,000) at domestic box office and around Rs. 3 crore (US$110,000) at overseas market taking lifetime gross to Rs. 10.5 crore (US$380,000) at the end of April.

=== Critical response ===
Saba Khalid of DAWN.com reviewed the film and wrote, "Hopefully, we’ve also graduated to a time that reviews of Pakistani movies will no longer be meant to just stroke director’s egos but really analyze and critique the originality and creativity of scripts, themes, characters, and judge the overall level of acting and direction displayed in the film." Rafay Mahmood of The Express Tribune rated movie 2/5 stars and given the verdict, "All in all Jalaibee has its moments but it is definitely not entertaining. It does pick up a little in the second-half but what kills it towards the end is a dragged moral debate for a film that purely stands on immoral choices and of ourse{sic} a very Na Maloom Afraad climax."

=== Accolades ===
Ceremony	Category	Recipient	Result
Lux Style Awards	Best Supporting Actor in a Film	Ali Safina	Nominated

== See also ==
- List of highest-grossing Pakistani films
- List of Pakistani films of 2015
