= Bilal Lashari =

Pakistani director (born 1981)

- بلال لاشاری
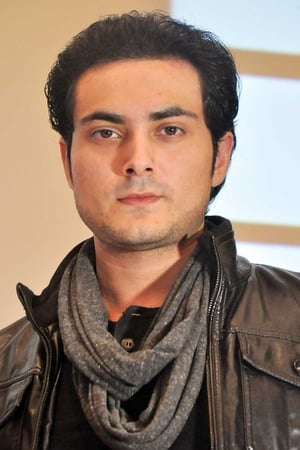
- Bilal Lashari in 2014
- Born: 4 August 1981 (age 45); Lahore, Punjab, Pakistan
- Education: Lahore University of Management Sciences, Lahore Grammar School Senior Boys Campus JT
- Alma mater: Academy of Art University
- Occupations: Actor, Screenwriter, Cinematographer
- Years active: 2004–present
- Known for: Waar, The Legend of Maula Jatt
- Relatives: Kamran Lashari (father)
- Awards: see below

Bilal Lashari (born 4 August 1981) is a Pakistani filmmaker, cinematographer, screenwriter and occasional actor. He made his directorial debut with Waar (2013), which at the time of its release became Pakistan's highest-grossing film (13th highest as of February 2026). His next feature The Legend of Maula Jatt (2022) was a remake of the 1979 film Maula Jatt. The film broke box office records and became Pakistan's highest grossing film. Lashari won awards in four categories at the ARY Film Awards 2014 for his directorial debut. In 2024, he was awarded with the President's Sitara-i-Imtiaz for his contribution towards the Pakistani cinema.

== Early life and education ==
Bilal Lashari was born into a Baloch family. His father, Kamran Lashari, is a retired senior Pakistani bureaucrat who served as a Federal Secretary and did a lot in cultural preservation in Lahore, while his paternal grandfather was a landlord, lawyer and poet. His younger brother, Rohail Lashari, an MBA graduate from HEC Paris, was the lead vocalist and rhythm guitarist for the Lahore-based band Jhol (2010-2015) and was "in charge" of the seventh season of Coke Studio Pakistan, while his other younger brother, Omar Lashari, is a Cornell-educated financial analyst.

Lashari grew up in Pakistan, attending local schools. He went to the United States of America for college, studying at the Academy of Art University in San Francisco, California, where he earned a Bachelor of Fine Arts (BFA) in Motion Pictures and Television in 2008.

== Career ==
After his return to Pakistan, Lashari first directed music videos and won 'Best Music Video Director' twice at the Lux Style Awards and ‘Best Pop Video’ at the MTV Pakistan Music Video Awards for "Sajni". He has also directed "Chal Bulleya" for Meekal Hassan Band. He has worked with artists and bands such as Abrarul Haq, Atif Aslam, Mekaal Hassan Band, Jal, and Entity Paradigm. He also directed the video "Chal Bulleya" for Meekal Hassan Band. In 2004, Lashari briefly worked as assistant director for Shoaib Mansoor during pre-production of Khuda Kay Liye in 2004.

Finally, in 2013, Lashari got his start on Waar. The film opened to positive reviews and was Pakistan's highest-anticipated film at that time. It was his feature directorial debut. His next project in 2022, The Legend of Maula Jatt opened to positive reviews and is considered to be Pakistan's biggest blockbuster and most expensive film. It is also the second Pakistani film to use the Red Epic W camera as it was previously used for Waar, which is mostly used for certain Hollywood films.

In 2020, Lashari co-directed and executive produced the music television series Velo Sound Station, featuring live studio performances by various Pakistani artists.

== Filmography ==
Year	Film	Director	Screenwriter	Actor	Role	Notes
2007	Khuda Kay Liye	No	No	No		Assistant director
2011	The Glorious Resolve	No	No	Yes		Documentary film
2013	Waar	Yes	No	Yes	CTG Officer Ali—Sniper	Debut as director
2015	Jawani Phir Nahi Ani	No	No	Yes	Police officer	Cameo appearance
2022	The Legend of Maula Jatt	Yes	Yes	No		Also cinematographer and editor

== Music videos ==
Year	Song	Artist	Album	Notes
2007	"Dhamaal"	Overload	Overload	Music Video Director
2007	"Sajni"	Jal	Boondh	Music Video Director
2008	"Kinara"	Atif Aslam	Meri Kahani	Music Video Director
2008	"Hungami Halaat"	Atif Aslam	Meri Kahani	Music Video Director
2009	"Chal Bulleya"	Mekaal Hasan Band	Saptak	Music Video Director
2010	"Shor Macha"	Entity Paradigm	Single album	Music Video Director

== Awards and nominations ==
=== ARY Film Awards ===
Year	Nominated work and artist	Award	Result
2013	Waar	Best Director	Won
2013	Waar	Best Director Jury	Won
2013	Waar	Best Cinematography	Won
2013	Waar	Best Editing	Won

=== Hum Awards ===
Year	Nominated work and artist	Award	Result
2014	Hum Honorary Special Recognition	Award for contribution to Pakistani Cinema	Won

=== Lux Style Award ===
Year	Nominated work and artist	Award	Result
2008	"Sajni"	Best Music Video Director	Nominated
2008	"Dhamaal"	Best Music Video Director	Won
2010	—N/a	Best Music Video Director	Nominated
2011	"Shor Macha"	Best Music Video Director	Won
2014	Waar	Best Film Director	Nominated

== Works cited ==
- "The one who singlehandedly revived a dying industry". The Express Tribune. 29 December 2013.
- "Bilal Lashari Charm – 'The Best Cinematographer of Pakistan'". MMN. Sumair Raza. Archived from the original on 29 May 2014.
- "The Legend of Maula Jatt –'The Legend of Maula Jatt is all set to release on Eid'". TheAzb. muhammad Saleem. 23 February 2020.
