= Adnan Sarwar =

Pakistani actor, director, musician, screenwriter, producer, doctor and racing driver

- Born: November 11, 1979 (age 46); Lahore, Punjab, Pakistan
- Occupations: Actor; Director; Screenwriter; Musician; Lyricist; Racing driver; Doctor
- Years active: 2002–present
- Known for: Shah, Motorcycle Girl

Adnan Sarwar is a Pakistani actor, director, musician, screenwriter, producer, lyricist, doctor and racing driver. He made his film debut in the biopic Shah, in which he also played the leading role.

== Career ==
=== Music ===
From 2002 onwards Adnan started his music career as a session guitar player for various Pakistani musicians such as The Trip, Mekaal Hasan Band and Ali Zafar, before forming the duo Club Caramel with singer Kiran Chaudhry in 2006. He has also composed the soundtrack of his debut film Shah.

=== Film and TV ===
Adnan made his film debut in the 2015 Pakistani sports biopic Shah, based on the life of the Olympiac medalist boxer Hussain Shah. Adnan also wrote the screenplay, directed the film and composed the original musical score. Adnan trained for the role of the homeless boxer by undergoing a six-month long boxing training regime and lost 10 kilos of weight. Despite being produced on a shoestring budget by a team of five people, Shah was hailed as "not only an achievement for Adnan Sarwar but for the whole Pakistani film industry" and Sarwar was praised by critics for his portrayal of the Lyari-born Pakistani boxing legend.

In April 2017, it was announced that Adnan was working on his second feature film Motorcycle Girl based on the real-life story of Zenith Irfan, who is thought to be the first Pakistani woman to make a solo motorcycle journey across the country at the age of 20. The film released in 2018 to good critical appreciation with Adnan writing, co-producing and directing it. He also wrote the lyrics for one of the movie's two songs, Pahiya.

Adnan marked his TV debut as an actor with Sarmad Khoosat's 2018 drama Aakhri Station.

In January 2019 he announced to make three films by 2020.

=== Other ===
Sarwar has trained as a Doctor of Medicine and is a graduate of Baqai Medical University, Karachi, and has previously worked as a doctor in Australia.

He is also trained as a high-performance race car driver and has represented Pakistan in lower categories of formula car racing series in various international auto racing competitions, he became the first ever local Pakistani to get selected to race for the A1 GP Team Pakistan in the A1 Grand Prix motorsports Worldcup series. He also founded a company Racing Pakistan, through which his aim was too create awareness of motorsports in Pakistan and to promote and educate young Pakistani talented drivers in international motor racing categories.

== Filmography ==
=== Films ===
Year	Film	Director	Producer	Screenwriter	Music composer	Role	Notes
2015	Shah	Yes	No	Yes	Yes	Syed Hussain Shah	Biopic about Hussain Shah
2018	Motorcycle Girl	Yes	Yes	Yes	No	Iffy	Biopic about Zenith Irfan

=== Television ===
Year	Title	Role	Director	Notes	Channel
2018	Aakhri Station	Waqar	No	Drama serial	ARY Digital
2021	Aik Hai Nigaar	No	Yes	Telefilm	ARY Digital
2023	Gunah	SHO Saleem	Yes	Drama serial	Express Entertainment
2024	Inspector Sabiha	No	Yes	Drama serial	Express Entertainment
2025	Agar Tum Sath Ho	No	Yes	Drama serial	Hum TV
2025	Dil Ne Kaha Dil Se	No	Yes	Telefilm	Geo TV

=== Web series ===
Year	Title	Role	Platform
2022	Baarwan Khiladi	Director	Tapmad TV

== Accolades ==
Ceremony	Category	Project	Result
15th Lux Style Awards	Best Film	Shah	Nominated
15th Lux Style Awards	Best Film Director	Shah	Nominated
15th Lux Style Awards	Best Lead Actor in a Film	Shah	Nominated
18th Lux Style Awards	Best Film	Motorcycle Girl	Nominated
