= List of Pakistani films of 2015 =

List of Pakistani films by year 2015

This is a list of Pakistani films released in 2015. Jawani Phir Nahi Ani was the all time grossing Pakistani film released on EidulAzha this year, replaced by Punjab Nahi Jaungi released on Eid ul Azha 2017.

== Highest-grossing films ==
The top 10 films released in 2015 by worldwide gross are as follows:

Highest-grossing films of 2015
Rank	Title	Studio	Gross	Ref.
1.	Jawani Phir Nahi Ani	Six Sigma Plus	Rs. 49.44 crore (US$1.8 million)	
2.	Wrong No	YNH Films	Rs. 42.30 crore (US$1.5 million)	
3.	Bin Roye	MD Films	Rs. 40.05 crore (US$1.4 million)	
4.	Jalaibee	Redrum Films	Rs. 28.30 crore (US$1.0 million)	
5.	Karachi Se Lahore	Showcase Films	Rs. 10.30 crore (US$370,000)	
6.	3 Bahadur	Waadi Animations	Rs. 6.65 crore (US$240,000)	
7.	Manto	A & B Entertainment	Rs. 5.05 crore (US$180,000)	
8.	Dekh Magar Pyaar Say	Shiny Toy Guns	Rs. 2.42 crore (US$87,000)	
9.	Moor	Azad Film Company	Rs. 1.85 crore (US$66,000)	
10.	Shah	Logos Films & Media	Rs. 1.02 crore (US$36,000)	

== Events ==
=== Award ceremonies ===
Date	Event	Host	Location	Ref.
April 9	3rd Hum Awards	Hum Network Limited	Dubai World Trade Centre, Dubai, UAE	
September 30	14th Lux Style Awards	Lux Style Awards	Karachi, Sindh, Pakistan	

=== Film Festivals ===
Date	Event	Host	Location	Ref.
September 14–17	1st Karawood International Film Festival	Kara Film Festival	Karachi, Sindh, Pakistan	

== Releases ==
=== January – March ===
Opening		Title	Genre	Director	Cast	Ref.
J A N	1	Good Morning Karachi	Drama	Sabiha Sumar	Amna Ilyas, Beo Raana Zafar, Yasir Aqueel, Saba Hameed, Atta Yaqub, Savera Nadeem, Farhan Ali Agha, Akif Illyas, Khalid Malik, Shaheen Khan, Aamina Sheikh, Nofil Naqvi, Merium Azmi	
M A R	5	Beyond the Heights	Documentary	Jawad Sharif	Samina Baig, Mirza Ali Baig, Jawad Sharif, Sohail Parwaaz	
M A R	6	Devdas	Romantic	Iqbal Kashmiri	Nadeem Shah, Zara Sheikh, Meera, Babar Ali, Raheela Agha, Asif Khan, Masood Akhter	
M A R	20	Jalaibee	Caper crime	Yasir Jaswal	Danish Taimoor, Ali Safina, Wiqar Ali Khan, Zhalay Sarhadi, Sajid Hasan, Sabeeka Imam, Adnan Jaffar, Uzair Jaswal	

=== April – June ===
Opening		Title	Genre	Director	Cast	Ref.
A p R	10	Teacher	Social, Drama	Mohammad Parvez	Farooq Zamir, Habib, Dilbar Munir, Isha Chaudhary, Maria Kamal, Mehar Akhtar	
M A Y	22	3 Bahadur	Animation, Fantasy	Sharmeen Obaid Chinoy	Muneeba Yaseen, Hanzala Shahid, Zuhab Khan, Behroze Sabzwari, Alyy Khan, Mustafa Changazi	
J U N	12	Maya	Horror	Jawad Bashir	Ahmed Abdul Rehman, Hina Jawad, Zain Afzal, Sheikh Mohammad Ahmed, Anam Malik	

=== July – September ===
Opening		Title	Genre	Director	Cast	Ref.
J U L	18	Bin Roye	Romance, Drama	Momina Duraid, Shahzad Kashmiri	Mahira Khan, Humayun Saeed, Armeena Rana Khan, Zeba Bakhtiar, Javed Sheikh	
J U L	18	Wrong No.	Romantic comedy	Yasir Nawaz	Danish Taimoor, Sohai Ali Abro, Jawed Sheikh, Shafqat Cheema, Danish Nawaz, Nadeem Jafri	
J U L	18	Bazaar	Erotic Drama	Liaqat Ali Khan	Arbaaz Khan, Pariya Khan, Sara Khan, Asma Lata	
J U L	18	Gunahgar	Action	Hanif Joya	Moammar Rana, Saima Khan, Babrak Shah, Sheeza Khan, Shafqat Cheema	
J U L	31	Karachi Se Lahore	Comedy, Road	Wajahat Rauf	Javed Sheikh, Shehzad Sheikh, Ayesha Omer, Yasir Hussain, Aashir Wajahat, Eshita Syed, Ahmed Ali, Rasheed Naz, Mantaha	
A U G	13	Shah	Biography, Sports	Adnan Sarwar	Adnan Sarwar, Kiran Choudhry, Sardar Baloch, Adeel Raees, Gulab Chandio	
A U G	14	Dekh Magar Pyaar Say	Romantic comedy	Asad ul Haq	Humaima Malick, Sikander Rizvi, Amna Ilyas, Irfan Khoosat	
A U G	14	Moor	Drama	Jami	Hameed Sheikh, Samiya Mumtaz, Shaz Khan, Abdul Qadir, Soniya Hussain, Ayaz Samoo, Nayyar Ejaz, Eshita Mehboob, Joshinder Chaggar, Omar, Zainullah, Shabbir Rana	
S E P	11	Manto	Biography, Drama	Sarmad Khoosat	Sarmad Khoosat, Saba Qamar, Mahira Khan, Imran Abbas, Sania Saeed, Faisal Qureshi, Hina Khawaja Bayat, Nimra Bucha, Savera Nadeem, Adnan Jaffar, Tipu Sharif, Nadia Afghan, Afraz Rasool, Yasra Rizvi, Irfan Khoosat	
S E P	11	Kasak	Action	Zaheer Yasmeen	Saba Mirza, Haider Sultan, Raheela Agha	
S E P	11	Swaarangi	Drama, Crime	Fida Hussain	Resham, Ayub Khoso Naveed Akhter, Waseem Manzoor, Zulfiqar Gulshahi, Aftab Nisar	
S E P	25	Halla Gulla	Romantic comedy	Kamran Akbar Khan	Javed Sheikh, Ismail Tara, Sidra Batool, Ghazala javed, Asim Mehmood, Ashraf khan	
S E P	25	Jawani Phir Nahi Ani	Adventure, Comedy	Nadeem Baig	Humayun Saeed, Hamza Ali Abbasi, Ahmed Ali Butt, Vasay Chaudhry, Aisha Khan, Sarwat Gillani, Mehwish Hayat, Sohai Ali Abro, Javed Sheikh, Bushra Ansari, Saba Hameed	
S E P	25	Sanam	Romantic	Syed Noor	Saima Noor, Babar Ali, Reema Khan, Naghma	

== See also ==
- 2015 in film
- 2015 in Pakistan
