= Dramay Baziyan =

- Genre: Sitcom, Comedy
- Written by: Farhad Qaim Khani; Syed Zain Raza
- Directed by: Danish Nawaz
- Starring: Danish Nawaz; Uroosa Siddiqui; Noman Habib; Hareem Farooq Zainab Shahjahan
- Theme music composer: Rahim Shah (musician)
- Opening theme: "Yeh Tera Fun, masti aur Dramay Baziyan" by Abrar ul Haq
- Country of origin: Pakistan
- Original languages: Urdu and English
- No. of seasons: 3
- No. of episodes: 126

Production
- Production locations: Karachi, Lahore, Islamabad, Dubai, and London
- Camera setup: Multi-camera setup
- Running time: 1 hour 7 mins(Eid Spiceal); 30 mins Ramadan; 71 mins

Original release
- Network: Hum TV
- Release: 4 February 2014 – 15 August 2017

Dramay Baziyan is a 2014 sitcom that premiered on Hum TV. It is directed by Danish Nawaz, written by Farhad Qaim Khani, and produced by Minhail Productions. It was nominated as Best Sitcom at 3rd Hum Awards but lost to Uff Meri Family.

== Cast ==
=== Main Cast ===
- Danish Nawaz
- Uroosa Siddiqui
- Noman Habib
- Hareem Farooq
- Zainab Shahjahan
- Hamza Noor

=== Supporting cast ===
- Hira Mani
- Mirza Shahi
- Hina Dilpazeer
- Sana Javed
- Hamza Ali Abbasi
- Ayesha Omer
- Nabeel Zafar as Shahrukh, worker of IKEA
- Mehmood Aslam as King ARUN
- Devon Bostick as Imran, captain of Airblue
- Sidra Ejaz as Zaina
- Hania Aamir as Anna
- Iqra Aziz
- Raheel Butt as Zeeshan
- Maria Khwaja as Aarzoo
- Irfan Motiwala
- Anam Tanveer
- Ghazala Javed
- Nida Yasir
- Yasir Nawaz
- Faisal Qureshi (television personality)
- Adeel Hashmi as Elmo
- Fiza Ali
- Fasial Khattak

=== Guest apprance ===
- Saba Qamar as MISS MEHDI (EPISODE 23)
- Sadia Khan (Episode 21)
- Salman Saqib Sheikh (EPISODE 23)
- Mahira Khan EID DAY 1ST
- Bilal Arshaf EID DAY 1ST
- Aamina Shekih EID DAY 2ND
- Aamir Khan EID DAY 3RD
- Tom Kenny (SEASON 3 EPISODE 15)
- Faysal Quraishi EPISODE 155
- Elmo as Mehdi Episode 100
- Ali KHAN
- ASMA KHATTAK
- Cookie Monster as Khan Episode 13

== Seasons and episodes ==
Season 1: 4 February 2014 - 6 July 2015 episodes: 126 Season 2: 17 July 2015 - 3 March 2016 episodes: 189 Season 3: 14 March 2016 - 15 August 2017 episodes: 90817
