= Tanveer Jamal =

Pakistani actor, director and producer (1960–2022)

- Born: 30 June 1960; Karachi, Pakistan
- Died: 13 July 2022 (aged 62); Tokyo, Japan

Comedy career
- Years active: 1989–2022

Tanveer Jamal (30 June 1960 – 13 July 2022) was a Pakistani actor, director and producer.

== Early life ==
After doing his matriculation in Karachi, he went to France for higher studies, and later worked in Japan as a fashion model.

== Career ==
He started his career in 1989 with director Kazim Pasha's play Jangloos and got fame from the first play. His other notable PTV dramas included Jinnah to Quaid, Samjhauta, Babar, Antha, Janam Jalli and Jalte Suraj. He became well known for directing and producing the first action-packed mega drama serial Godfather in a private production, the drama being recorded in both Pakistan and Japan.

He remained active as an actor in Pakistan for nearly four decades, and was awarded the Best Actor Award by PTV and had also launched a private satellite television channel, Shaheen Pay TV (SPTV), one of the first in the country.

== Personal life ==
=== Family ===
He was married to a Japanese woman with whom he had three children. The family resided in Japan.

=== Other interests ===
Apart from acting, he was also a squash player and a cinematographer.

He was a painter as well, gifting paintings to fellow actor Aijaz Aslam.

== Illness and death ==
Jamal was first diagnosed with lung cancer in 2016 but recovered after treatment. He was diagnosed with the disease for the second time while shooting for a drama serial in Pakistan. In May 2022 he decided to move to Japan for complete treatment of cancer. He died on 13 July 2022, in Tokyo.

== Selected television dramas ==
Year	Title	Role	Notes
1989	Jangloos	Niaz Muhammad	Television debut
1992	Samjhota	–	Social drama
1994	Babar	–	Biographical series on the Mughal emperor
1995	Dharas	Doctor Nasir	PTV serial
1997	Janam Jali	–	Family/romantic drama
1998	Jinnah Se Quaid	Shamsu	PTV historical serial
1999	Jalta Suraj	–	PTV serial
2003	Godfather	Shamayel	PTV serial
2004	Tanha Tanha	Tariq	PTV serial
2010	Hum Tum	Bilal	Supporting role on Geo Entertainment
2018	Khalish	Ikhlaq	Family thriller on Geo
2020	Raaz-e-Ulfat	Iftikhar	Romantic drama on Geo
2021	Mohlat	Tahir	Recurring family-series role on Geo
