= Adhi Gawahi =

- Genre: Romance; Serial drama
- Created by: MD Productions
- Developed by: MD Productions
- Written by: Saima Akram Chaudhry
- Directed by: Fahim Burney
- Starring: Sohai Ali Abro; Azfar Rehman; Uzma Khan; Ayesha Sana; Saleem Sheikh
- Country of origin: Pakistan
- Original language: Urdu
- No. of seasons: 1
- No. of episodes: 30

Production
- Producer: Momina Duraid
- Camera setup: Multi-camera setup
- Production company: MD Productions

Original release
- Network: Hum TV
- Release: 5 July – 12 October 2017

Adhi Gawahi (Urdu: آدھی گواہی, lit. 'Half Witness') is a Pakistani romantic television series that was first aired on 5 July 2017, replacing Nazr-e-Bad. It was directed by Fahim Burney and written by Saima Akram Chudhery.

Sohai Ali Abro plays the main protagonist, and Azfar Rehman plays the antagonist in their sixth on-screen collaboration after Tanhai, Dhol Bajnay Laga, De Ijazat Jo Tu, Tumhari Natasha, and Kaisi Ye Paheli.

== Overview ==
Salwa and her cousin Saad are going to get married, but their schoolmate Hamdan approaches with pictures and video of his marriage contract with Salwa, which was recorded as a joke.

The title refers to the Islamic tradition that in a court of law, the claims of one witness who is a man can be overturned by two who are women. Since Salwa is fighting Hamdan by herself, this makes her a "half witness" (aadhi gawahi) against him.

== Plot ==
The story revolves around Salwa and Saad, childhood best friends and cousins, Hamdan, and the issue of an unintentional nikkah.

Salwa is a modern, sweet, kind, and fun-loving girl living with her mother, uncles, and their respective families following the death of her father. Most family members are quite happy with this arrangement, especially Saad's mother and the older Bhabhi, Rana, who sees Salwa as her own and wants her son and Salwa to get married.

This does not sit well with the younger Bhabhi Khawla, who sees Salwa as competition for her own daughter, Soha, who is deeply in love with Saad and deeply despises her for the attention Saad reserves just for Salwa while basically ignoring Soha.

Enters Chaudhry Hamdan Mustafa, a rich, egoistic, spoiled brat who fancies Salwa and is deeply possessive about her. Not only is he possessive about her, but he would do just about anything to ensure that Salwa is his. He is used to getting what he wants, courtesy of his mother who turns a blind eye to all of his faults out of love, and to him Salwa is no different.

Salwa dislikes Hamdan and his backward mentality, but puts up with him for the sake of Saad and the rest of their friends.

The five are students of media studies at a prestigious university. Their semester is coming to an end, but there is one last production assignment standing in the way of these friends—a short film that is due very soon. At first everything is seemingly fine, until Saad breaks his leg, which prompts Salwa to be paired up with Hamdan for the project that is due soon. Saad takes time to recover, which makes things worse for the friends, and Saad and Salwa's relationship turns bitter. The accident turns their lives around.

Even though the theme of the project revolves around women empowerment, it becomes the downfall for Salwa. By agreeing to shoot a Nikkah scene with Hamdan, Salwa unknowingly marries Hamdan for real, which sets the premise of the entire show since she is to be married to Saad soon after. Before the marriage, Salwa is kidnapped, unbeknownst to everyone else who believed she ran away. Due to Salwa's disappearance, Saad is married to his cousin Soha. After his marriage, Salwa comes home to find a married Saad, her mother has an angina attack and is in the hospital. She turns her back against her family for not trusting her.

== Cast ==
=== Main cast ===
- Sohai Ali Abro as Salwa Mansoor
- Azfar Rehman as Chaudhry Hamdan Mustafa
- Ali Josh as Saad
- Uzma Khan as Soha
- Maria Malik as Nageen
- Usama Khan as Usama
- Arman Ali Pasha as Faseeh

=== Recurring cast ===
- Ayesha Sana as Bee Ji
- Saleem Sheikh as Faizan 'Faizee'
- Munazzah Arif as Ayesha
- Humayun Gul as Azhar
- Khalid Butt as Naeem
- Marium Shafi as Rana (eldest sister in law)
- Ruhi Khan as Khawla (youngest sister in law)
- Mian Suhail as Bilal (Guest appearance)
- Mohsin Abbas Haider as Arsalan (Guest appearance)
- Hammad Shoaib as Hammad (Guest appearance)
