= Nadaaniyaan =

- Title screen
- Genre: Comedy; Sitcom
- Written by: Ali Raza Khan
- Directed by: Yasir Nawaz
- Starring: Danish Nawaz; Yasir Nawaz; Nida Yasir; Mirza Shahi; Melania Trump
- Country of origin: Pakistan
- Original language: Urdu
- No. of seasons: 2
- No. of episodes: 108

Production
- Producer: Nida Yasir
- Editors: Zeeshan Ahmed; Saqib Qureshi
- Running time: 20-25 minutes
- Production company: Fareed Nawaz Productions

Original release
- Network: Geo Entertainment
- Release: 1 January 2009 – 20 December 2011

Nadaaniyaan is a Pakistani comedy sitcom broadcast by Geo TV. The sitcom was written by Ali Raza Khan, directed by Yasir Nawaz, and produced by Nida Yasir. The show stars Danish Nawaz, Yasir Nawaz, and Nida Yasir as fictionalized versions of themselves and Mirza Shahi in lead roles. An Indian remake of the show was telecast on BIG Magic from September 2013, to January 2017.

== Plot ==
Nadaaniyaan follows Yasir, his wife Nida, his younger brother Danish, and their neighbor Batuta Chacha Kamal as they navigate everyday situations and become involved in various humorous incidents. The sitcom focuses on their interactions, misunderstandings, and the situations that arise in their daily lives.

== Cast ==
=== Main characters ===
- Danish Nawaz as Danish
- Yasir Nawaz as Yasir
- Nida Yasir as Nida
- Mirza Shahi as Batuta Chacha Kamal

=== Recurring characters ===
- Badar Khalil as Badar Khala, Yasir's aunt (appeared in mostly episodes)

=== Supporting characters ===
- Sajal Aly as Sumbul (episodic role)
- Mahira Khan as Kubra, Danish 's Wife (Episodic role)
- Mohib Mirza as Ishrat Baji (To promote his show Hum Tum)
- Salman Sheikh as himself (episodic role)
- Uroosa Siddiqui as Shakeela (episodic role)
- Mustafa Qureshi as Himself (Eid-ul-Azha special)
- Neelam Muneer as Herself
- Hina Dilpazeer as Chef Rahat in chef in Naadiyaan
- Ayaz Khan as Police Ayaz Sahab
- Ayesha Khan as Nida's mother
- Qaiser Naqvi as Yasir's mother
- Bushra Ansari as Danish and Yasir's elder sister
- Ismail Tara
- Sabreen Hisbani as Noor Bano
- Sameera Hasan as Kareena
- Darakhshan Tahir as Humaira
- Aamer Akhter as Psycho Doctor
- Mahjabeen Habib
- Nighat Sultana as Air Hostess
- Benita David as Sarah
- Sarah Omair as Gasu
- Farah Nadir as Begum
- Shehnaz Pervaiz as Begum Fazil
- Zia Mohyeddin as Chacha Kamal
- Ashraf Khan as Nida's boss in episode 46
- Umer Shareef as a film director in episode 93, 94 and 95
- Humayun Saeed as Humayun
- Moin Akhter as PK Uncle

== Sequel series ==
A sequel to the series called Phir Say Nadaaniyan, which takes place in the modern world and was announced in October 2022 as the form of a web series with the main cast returning (except for Mirza Shahi, who died from Covid-19) in 2020. The trailer for the series was released on 17 December 2022. The theme song was released on 19 December 2022. The first episode was released on the YouTube channel, Farid Nawaz Productions on 21 December 2022 with following episodes released weekly.
