= Wrong No. 2 =

- Theatrical release poster
- Directed by: Yasir Nawaz
- Screenplay by: Yasir Nawaz
- Story by: Danish Nawaz
- Produced by: Sh Amjad Rasheed; Hassan Zia
- Starring: Sami Khan; Neelam Muneer; Sana Fakhar; Jawed Sheikh; Shafqat Cheema; Mahmood Aslam; Yasir Nawaz; Shehnaz Pervaiz
- Cinematography: Naeem Mustafa
- Edited by: Salman Tehzeeb
- Music by: Simaab Sen
- Production company: Mastermind Films
- Distributed by: Distribution Club; Eros International
- Release date: 5 June 2019 (Eid al-Fitr)
- Running time: 132 minutes
- Country: Pakistan
- Language: Urdu

Wrong No. 2 (also written as Wrong Number 2) is a 2019 Pakistani romantic comedy film. It is a sequel to the 2015 film Wrong No., directed by Yasir Nawaz, produced by Sh Amjad Rasheed and Hassan Zia. It is the second installment in the Wrong No. film series. The film features Sami Khan and Neelam Muneer in leading roles. Supporting cast includes Jawed Sheikh, Mehmood Aslam, Ahmad Hassan and Danish Nawaz.

The film was released on Eid ul Fitr, 5 June 2019, and was distributed by Distribution Club and Eros International. The film emerged as a box-office success and became the third highest-grossing Pakistani film of 2019.

== Plot ==
Neelum Munir stars as Zoya, a rich heiress who falls in love with a man who is not as financially stable as herself. Her father mistakes her lover for someone else and a comedy of errors stands in the way of their union.

== Cast ==
- Sami Khan as Omar
- Neelam Muneer as Zoya
- Mehmood Aslam as Wazir
- Jawed Sheikh as Gul Nawaz
- Ahmed Hassan as Happy
- Shafqat Cheema as Chaudhary
- Danish Nawaz as Sexy Shaukat
- Yasir Nawaz as Mehboob
- Sana Fakhar as Masooma
- Ahmed Hassan as Happy
- Irfan Khoosat as Gogi
- Mustafa Baloch as Turka
- Adnan Hussain as Turka's friend
- Saqib Sumeer as Pimp
- Ashraf Khan as Abu Jan (cameo appearance)
- Fareeha Jabeen as Abu Jan's wife
- Shehnaz Pervaiz as Aunty (cameo appearance)
- Yashma Gill as Party girl (special appearance in "Gali Gali" song)
- Nida Yasir as Host (cameo appearance)

== Release ==
The first teaser of the film was released on 13 April 2019. The film was released on 5 June 2019.

== Reception ==
=== Box office ===
On its first day, the film collected 1.6 crores. The film earned a total of 10.60 crores in its first weekend. After eight weeks, it earned Rs. 20 crores (domestic) and Rs. 1.65 crores (overseas).

=== Critical reception ===
Hassan Hassan of Galaxy Lollywood rated the film 3.5 out of 5 stars saying that If you have loved JPNA series or any other feel-good masala entertainers that don't defy logic, Wrong Number 2 is the film you should go for. There are very high chances that you will leave the cinema halls amused, for all the right reasons. Zeeshan Ahmad of The Express Tribune remarked, ''Wrong No 2 lays groundwork for a plot only to completely ignore it later. The central romance is shallow and half-baked, with the only upside to the film a few moments of genuine humour.''

== Soundtrack ==
The music of the film is composed by Simaab Sen while lyrics are written by Fatima Najeeb, Ahsan Ali Taj and others.

Track listing
No.	Title	Singer(s)	Length
1.	"Yaariyan"	Harshdeep Kaur	4.03
2.	"Tu hi har rang main"	Ali Tariq	3.40
3.	"Gali Gali"	Shahid Mallya and Isheeka Chakravarty	3.12
4.	"Jind Sa"	Javed Ali	4.04
5.	"Handsome Mian"	Eliza Dey	2.00
6.	"Garbar"	Siddharth Barsur	3.30
7.	"Yaariyan (reprise)"	Harshdeep Kaur	3.50

== See also ==
- List of Pakistani films of 2019
