= Farah Nadeem =

Pakistani actress

- Born: 3 June 1970 (age 56); Karachi, Pakistan
- Education: University of Karachi
- Occupation: Actress
- Years active: 1995–present
- Children: 3
- Relatives: Fatima Effendi (niece); Fouzia Mushtaq (sister); Kanwar Arsalan (nephew)

Farah Nadeem is a Pakistani actress. She is known for her roles in dramas Jaal, Adhoora Bandhan, Tarap, Besharam, Aakhir Kab Tak, Mere Humsafar and Kam Zarf.

== Early life ==
Farah was born on 3 June 1970, in Karachi, Pakistan. She completed her graduation from University of Karachi.

== Career ==
She made her debut as an actress in 1995. She first appeared in PTV dramas. Farah appeared in the dramas Kashish, Tipu Sultan and Sham Se Pehle in 1998 and Who Kaun Hai in 2000. She also appeared in dramas Pyarey Afzal, Mera Naam Yousuf Hai, Dharkan and Besharam.

== Personal life ==
Farah is married and has three children. Farah's sister Fouzia Mushtaq is an actress and newscaster and actress Fatima Effendi is her niece.

== Filmography ==
=== Television ===
Year	Title	Role	Network
1995	Aik Thi Mehru	Humaira's friend	PTV
1996	Woh Kaun Hai	Aasia	PTV
1998	Shaam Sey Phelay	Sumaira	PTV
2006	Dil, Diya, Dehleez	Sanam	Hum TV
2006	Manzil	Mehnaz	ARY Digital
2007	Kaisa Yeh Junoon	Atiya	ARY Digital
2010	Dohri	Khala	ARY Digital
2010	Adhoore Dastaan	Sehar's aunt	Hum TV
2011	Aurat Ka Ghar Konsa	Amber	PTV
2011	Dil Manay Na	Sana's mother	TV One
2011	Ahmed Habib Ki Betiyan	Humera	Hum TV
2011	Ek Hatheli Pe Hina Ek Hatheli Pe Lahoo	Aziza	Geo Entertainment
2011	Meri Behan Maya	Salma	Geo Entertainment
2012	Ek Tamanna Lahasil Si	Anum	Hum TV
2012	Sham Se Pehle	Adeel's mother	PTV
2012	Mi Raqsam	Farah Qureshi	Geo TV
2012	Baandi	Ishrat	ARY Digital
2013	Mein Hari Piya	Sajida	Hum TV
2013	Khoya Khoya Chand	Azra	Hum TV
2013	Tanhai	Jia's mother	Hum TV
2013	Rukhsaar	Sabia	Geo TV
2013	Pyarey Afzal	Yasmeen's mother	ARY Digital
2013	Ishq Hamari Galiyon Mein	Haroon's mother	Hum TV
2014	Malika-e-Aliya	Surraya	Geo Entertainment
2014	Tum Bin	Aliya Begum	PTV
2014	Choti	Aapa	Geo Entertainment
2015	Riffat Aapa Ki Bahuein	Naeema	ARY Digital
2015	Kanch Ke Rishtay	Rushna	PTV
2015	Shukrana	Bilquis	Express Entertainment
2015	Mera Naam Yousuf Hai	Bushra	A Plus
2015	Zinda Dargor	Sonia's mother-in-law	ARY Digital
2015	Guzaarish	Sara's mother-in-law	ARY Digital
2016	Main Kamli	Khala	Aaj Entertainment
2016	Dharkan	Samina	Hum TV
2016	Lagaao	Najma	Hum TV
2016	Besharam	Shakira	ARY Digital
2016	Kathputli	Zeenat	Hum TV
2016	Khwab Saraye	Zarina	Hum TV
2017	Moray Saiyaan	Zarmina	ARY Digital
2017	Kesi Ye Paheli	Zainab	Urdu 1
2017	Bilqees Urf Bitto	Sharmeen	Urdu 1
2017	Adhoora Bandhan	Tabbassum	Geo TV
2018	Muhabbat Dard Bunti Hai	Zara	PTV
2018	Aik Mohabbat Kaafi Hai	Saeeda	BOL Entertainment
2018	Hum Usi Kay Hain	Rakshi	BOL Entertainment
2018	Mein Muhabbat Aur Tum	Aliya	Play TV
2018	Balaa	Saleha's mother-in-law	ARY Digital
2018	Qaid	Tasneem	Geo Entertainment
2019	Phir Wajah Kya Hui	Rusba's mother-in-law	A Plus
2019	Wafa Lazim To Nahi	Anisa	TV One
2019	Kam Zarf	Surya	Geo Entertainment
2019	Jaal	Tehmina	Hum TV
2019	Kahin Deep Jaley	Zeeshan's aunt	Geo TV
2020	Tarap	Salma	Hum TV
2020	Mann-e-Iltija	Hania's mother	ARY Digital
2020	Dil Tanha Tanha	Ammi	Hum TV
2020	Mera Wajood	Hamid's mother	Express Entertainment
2021	Makafaat Season 3	Amma Ji	Geo Entertainment
2021	Oye Motti	Shagufta	Express Entertainment
2021	Sirat-e-Mustaqeem	Farzana	ARY Digital
2021	Sitam	Salman's mother	Hum TV
2021	Aakhir Kab Tak	Nasir's mother	Hum TV
2021	Ishq Hai	Farhat	ARY Digital
2021	Bebaak	Samina	Hum TV
2021	Mere Humsafar	Khurram's mother	ARY Digital
2022	Inteqam	Sonia	Geo TV
2022	Beqadar	Rukhsana	Hum TV
2022	Makafaat Season 4	Atia	Geo Entertainment
2022	Nisa	Misha's mother	Geo Entertainment
2022	Usne Chaha Tha Chand	Muniba	PTV
2022	Hasrat	Safiya	Hum TV
2022	Woh Pagal Si	Zohra	ARY Digital
2022	Fraud	Talal's mother	ARY Digital
2022	Siyani	Raheela	Geo Entertainment
2022	Oye Motti Season 2	Mehwish's mother	Express Entertainment
2022	Noor	Naila Arif	Express Entertainment
2022	Muqaddar Ka Sitara	Ramsha's mother	ARY Digital
2023	Sar-e-Rah	Mehnaz	ARY Digital
2023	Dikhawa Season 4	Abeer's mother	Geo Entertainment
2023	Sirat-e-Mustaqeem Season 3	Mehroz's mother	ARY Digital
2023	Makafaat Season 5	Safia	Geo Entertainment
2023	Ehraam-e-Junoon	Shakeela	Geo TV
2023	Dagh-e-Dil	Almas's mother	Hum TV
2023	Daurr	Shezray's mother	Green Entertainment
2023	Ehsaan Faramosh	Faria	ARY Digital
2023	Mein Kahani Hun	Farah	Express Entertainment
2023	Yehi to Pyar Hai	Nauman's mother	A-Plus
2023	Dil Hi Tou Hai	Haroon's mother	ARY Digital
2023	Kahain Kis Se	Mumtaz	Hum TV
2024	Sirat-e-Mustaqeem Season 4	Batool	ARY Digital
2024	Nasihat	Jameela	Green Entertainment
2024	Qissa-e-Dil	Sabeen	Hum TV
2024	Wifi Boyz	Neha's mother	Set Entertainment
2024	Kaisi Hai Ye Ruswai	Ayesha	Express Entertainment
2024	Bewafai	Sadia	A-Plus
2024	Nadaan	Zoya	Hum TV
2025	Ae Dil	Riffat	ARY Digital
2025	Kathputli	Shireen	Geo Entertainment
2025	Sher	Hajra	ARY Digital

=== Telefilm ===
Year	Title	Role
2013	Aaya Saawan	Mahrosh
2013	Ooper Gori Ka Makaan	Farha
2022	Tara Ka Sajjan	Tara's mother
2023	Mareez-e-Muhabbat	Rukhsana
2026	Bhaag Sunny Bhaag	Noor Jehan

=== Film ===
Year	Title	Role
2024	Jee Ve Sohneya Jee	Aasiya's mother

== Awards and nominations ==
Year	Award	Category	Result	Title	Ref.
2003	12th PTV Awards	Best Actress	Won	Herself	
