= Bikhray Moti =

Pakistani television series

- بکھرے موتی
- Written by: Edison Idrees Masih
- Directed by: Shahid Shafaat
- Starring: Yasir Nawaz; Neelam Muneer; Wahaj Ali
- Country of origin: Pakistan
- Original language: Urdu
- No. of episodes: 25

Production
- Producers: Humayun Saeed; Shahzad Nasib; Samina Humayun Saeed; Sana Shahnawaz
- Production locations: Karachi, Sindh, Pakistan
- Running time: 40 Minutes
- Production companies: Six Sigma Plus; Next Level Entertainment

Original release
- Network: ARY Digital
- Release: 26 May – 10 November 2020

Bikhray Moti (Urdu: بکھرے موتی, lit. 'Scattered Pearls') is a 2020 Pakistani television series that premiered on 26 May 2020, on ARY Digital. It is co-produced by Humayun Saeed and Samina Humayun Saeed under their banners Six Sigma Plus and Next Level Entertainment. The main cast includes Neelam Muneer, Yasir Nawaz, and Wahaj Ali. The story revolves around Ayeza, played by Muneer, a strong-willed, independent girl who after her sister's death has no choice but marry her cruel brother-in-law to obtain custody of her niece and nephews. The last episode was aired in November 2020.

== Cast ==
- Yasir Nawaz as Zulfiqar aka Zulfi
- Neelam Muneer as Ayeza
- Wahaj Ali as Ahad
- Samina Ahmad as Shamsa, Zulfi's mother
- Waseem Abbas as Gulzar, Ayeza's father
- Rashid Farooqui as Tufail
- Shaista Jabeen as Shehnaz, Ayeza's mother
- Fareeda Shabbir as Qudsia
- Saleem Mairaj as Ghulam, Qudsia's husband
- Anas Yasin as Janu
- Faiza Gillani as Shaggo
- Tabbasum Arif as Jehangir's mother
- Nausheen Shah as Faiza
- Hassam Khan

== Production ==
After the success of the 2018 romantic drama Dil Mom Ka Diya, the director Shahid Shafaat, and producer Humayun Saeed, Samina Humayun Saeed decided to re-unite for another project with a family drama theme. They decided to cast the same lead i.e. Muneer and Nawaz, and announced their project in August 2019.

The first and second teaser was released by ARY Digital on 18 May 2020.

== Awards and nominations ==
Year	Awards	Category	Recipient	Result	Ref.
March 2021	ARY People's Choice Awards	Favorite Actress in a role of Wife	Neelam Muneer	Nominated	
March 2021	ARY People's Choice Awards	Favorite Actress in a role of Behen	Neelam Muneer	Nominated	
March 2021	ARY People's Choice Awards	Favorite Actress in a role of Maa	Neelam Muneer	Nominated	
March 2021	ARY People's Choice Awards	Favorite Actress in a role of Saas	Samina Ahmed	Nominated	
5 November 2021	Pakistan International Screen Awards	Best Television Actor (Jury)	Yasir Nawaz	Nominated	
5 November 2021	Pakistan International Screen Awards	Best Television Actress (Jury)	Neelam Muneer	Nominated	
