= Chakkar (film) =

2021 film directed by Yasir Nawaz

- Film Poster
- Directed by: Yasir Nawaz
- Screenplay by: Syed Jibran Yasir Nawaz
- Story by: Zafar Imran
- Produced by: Nida Yasir
- Starring: Ahsan Khan; Neelam Muneer
- Cinematography: Saleem Daad
- Production company: Farid Nawaz Productions
- Distributed by: Everady Pictures
- Release date: 3 May 2022
- Running time: 128 minutes
- Country: Pakistan
- Language: Urdu

Chakkar is a 2022 Pakistani murder mystery film directed by Yasir Nawaz, and produced by Nida Yasir, under the banner of Farid Nawaz Productions. It stars Ahsan Khan and Neelam Muneer, with Yasir Nawaz and Jawed Sheikh in supporting roles. The film was released on the Eid al-Fitr (3 May 2022) with negative reviews from critics towards its storyline, performance and direction. The film was declared a box Average.

== Cast ==
- Ahsan Khan as Kabir Ahmed: Mehreen's husband, Zara's partner in crime. (Main antagonist)
- Neelam Muneer in dual roles
  - Mehreen Khan: Kabir's wife, Zara's sister, (Dead)
  - Zara Khan: Mehreen's sister, Kabir's partner in crime. (Antagonist)
- Yasir Nawaz as Inspector Shahzad.
- Ahmed Hassan
- Jawed Sheikh
- Naveed Raza as Naved
- Mehmood Aslam
- Suhail Khan as Insurance Officer
- Danish Nawaz as Director (cameo)
- Shoaib Malik in a (cameo appearance)

== Production ==
The film was officially announced in 2019 with Feroze Khan and Mawra Hocane in the leading cast. In early 2020, it was revealed that Khan has been replaced by Ahsan Khan while Neelam Muneer has replaced Hocane. The film's principal photography began in March 2020 in Karachi. The film was wrapped up on 27 December 2020.

== Soundtrack ==
The music of the film is composed by Naveed Naushad.

== Release ==
In January 2021, it was announced that it is set to be released on the occasion of Eid-ul-Fitr 2022. It had a world television premiere on Eid al-Adha, 10 July 2022, on ARY Digital.

== Accolades ==
Year	Awards	Category	Nominee	Result	Ref.
October 6, 2023	Lux Style Awards	Best Film Director	Yasir Nawaz	Nominated	
