= Mehrunisa V Lub U =

2017 Pakistani film by Yasir Nawaz

- Film poster
- Directed by: Yasir Nawaz
- Written by: Yasir Nawaz Saqib Sameer
- Produced by: Hassan Zia; Nida Yasir; Yasir Nawaz
- Starring: Sana Javed Danish Taimoor Javed Sheikh
- Cinematography: Saleem Daad
- Edited by: Rizwan AQ
- Music by: Simaab Sen
- Production company: YNH Films
- Distributed by: Eveready Pictures; Urdu 1 Pictures; Fox Star Studios
- Release date: 26 June 2017 (Pakistan); (Eid al-Fitr)
- Running time: 133 mins
- Country: Pakistan
- Language: Urdu
- Box office: Rs. 28.20 crore (US$1.0 million)

Mehrunisa V Lub U is a 2017 Pakistani romantic socio-comedy film written and directed by Yasir Nawaz. The film was released on 26 June 2017. It was produced by Nida Yasir and Hassan Zia under the YNH Films production company and is distributed by Eveready Pictures and Urdu 1 Pictures. The film stars Danish Taimoor and Sana Javed.

Reviews of the film were mixed. While some felt it was a colourful guilt-free family film released for Eid al-Fitr, others thought there were too many dirty jokes and that better writing and direction could have helped convey its simple message of community stewardship.

== Plot ==
Ali, a young Pakistani, returns from China to Karachi with gifts for his family and friends. He is in love with his childhood crush Mehru, the daughter of his father's friend, and a marriage alliance is made between their families. Meanwhile, Marzi, a local transgender don, seeks to buy out the neighbourhood in a scheme with a politician to profit from anticipated Chinese development in the area.

Newlyweds Ali and Mehru are unable to conceive a child. A doctor suggests that stress could be the reason, as Mehru has been unable to adjust to the city squalor and fears crime. Ali decides to let her stay at her father's home in the country, while deciding to improve his neighbourhood by changing the attitudes of its residents.

With his trusted friend Jani, Ali sets out to convince the community to improve their neighbourhood. Some are resistant but early progress convinces them to keep the roads and buildings clean, if only as a facade. Mehru realizes that Ali's neighbours are good people, and the revitalization leads to a news telecast of economic growth and financial stability.

Desperate to gain control of the block, Marzi rents an apartment and tries to create trouble with his goons. The politician kidnaps Mehru and demands ₨3 crore (30 million rupees) ransom from Ali. To raise the money, his neighbours sell their apartments to Marzi for a mere ₨10 lakhs (1 million rupees). Realizing the scheme, Ali and his friends rescue Mehru while the politician is holding a press conference, and expose his misdeeds to the media. Some time later, Ali and Mehru welcome their baby to a safe and clean neighbourhood.

== Cast ==
- Danish Taimoor as Ali
- Sana Javed as Mehrunisa
- Saqib Sameer as Jani & Jani's father (dual role)
- Qavi Khan as Bunty (Ali's grandfather)
- Javed Sheikh as Mian Bhai
- Nida Mumtaz as Hajra
- Adnan Saeed as Zia
- Sarah Omair Siddique as Yasra
- Dr. Faraz Nawaz as Malik Shahab Shah
- Nayyer Ejaz as Marzi
- Arshad Mehmood as Dr. Najeeb (Mehrunisa's father)
- Laila Zuberi as Mariam (Mehrunisa's mother)
- Syed Mohammad Ahmed as Manzoor; a counsellor
- Hina Khawaja Bayat as a lady doctor
- Shamsudin as Malik
- Asma Khan as Mehek (stage drama dancer)
- Saira Ghaffar as Laali
- Khalid Nizami as Shafqoo Chacha
- Mirza Sethi as Chacha Kamal
- Waqar Hussain as Kareena
- Zain Nazar as Karishma
- Muhammad Ali Isani as Azhar (mechanic)
- Khawaja Saleem Ahmed as Khadim Ali (S.H.O.)
- Chand Bawani as Bubbly
- Amna Ilyas (cameo in the song "Marhaba")
- Yasir Nawaz (cameo in the ending)

== Production ==
On 24 January 2016, director Yasir Nawaz confirmed that he had started shooting for his new movie, Mehrunisa V Lub U. He selected Danish Taimoor to play the lead male role and Sana Javed to debut in the movie as the lead female.

The filming began in Karachi in late 2016, then moved to northern Pakistan. The film was shot in a span of 45 days.

== Release ==
The film premiered on 23 June 2017 in Karachi and was released on 26 June, Eid al-Fitr, marking the end of Ramadan.

=== Critical reception ===
Reviews were mixed. Rafay Mahmood of The Express Tribune rated the film 3.5 out of 5 and said, "You take home a very important lesson and don't feel guilty for sitting through it." Somia Ashraf of DAWN Images felt of the film's message, "its not the place that is bad but people, but perhaps with a better script and direction, the concept could have been highlighted better." Shah Jahan Khurram of Samaa TV commented, "the plot of the film could have been better".

Ifrah Salman, the editor of Hip in Pakistan, rated it 3 out of 5 as "a colorful and vibrant film that's crisp" but that "the no-brain plot that fails to highlight the honest social taboo it tries to shed light upon." Omair Alavi of Very Filmi felt there were conceptual mistakes: "some vulgarity scattered here and there to make a 'family entertainer' that is a big No-No for your family." Syed Hashir Ali of Youlin Magazine commented, "an entertaining film, although there are moments when the timing of songs and jokes completely miss the mark".

== Soundtrack ==
Mehrunisa V Lub U

Soundtrack album by Simaab Sen
- Released: 9 June 2017
- Recorded: 2016–2017
- Genre: Feature film soundtrack
- Length: 20:43
- Language: Urdu
- Label: T-Series
- Producer: YNH Films

The music for the film was released by T-Series on 9 June 2017.

All music is composed by Simaab Sen.

No.	Title	Lyrics	Singer(s)	Length
1.	"Tu Hi Tu"	Gulzar	Sukhwinder Singh	4:40
2.	"Badla"	Gulzar	Sukhwinder Singh	3:59
3.	"Beliya"	Gulzar	Armaan Malik, Aditi Paul	4:30
4.	"Marhaba"	Prashant Ingole	Nakash Aziz, Mohini Shri	5:01
5.	"Mehrunisa V Lub U"		Simaab Sen	2:33
Total length:				20:43

== See also ==
- List of Pakistani films of 2017
