= Neelam Muneer =

Pakistani actress

Neelam Muneer Khan
- Born: 20 March 1992 (age 34); Mardan, KPK, Pakistan
- Occupations: Actress, model
- Years active: 2008–present
- Known for: Qaid-e-Tanhai; Dil Mom Ka Diya; Jal Pari; Meri Behan Maya; Kahin Deep Jaley
- Spouse: Mohammad Rashid (m. 2025)

Neelam Muneer (Pashto/Urdu: نیلم منیر خان; born 20 March 1992) is a Pakistani actress and model who appears in television dramas and films. She is best known for portraying the role of Ulfat in television series Dil Mom Ka Diya (2018), which earned her a nomination at the 18th Lux Style Awards for Best TV Actress. She made her film debut with comedy-thriller film Chupan Chupai (2017), followed by a starring role in romantic-comedy Wrong No. 2 (2019), both of which were commercially successful.

== Early life ==
Neelam Muneer Khan was born in Mardan, Khyber Pakhtunkhwa, Pakistan but was brought up in Karachi. Her father died when she was three years old. Her mother raised Neelam and her three sisters as a single parent. While in school, she started modelling and later completed her graduation privately. She was initially approached by Shamoon Abbasi for a television series. Eventually, she entered the television industry with director Kazim Pasha's drama serial Thora Sa Aasmaan, which aired on PTV Home.

== Career ==
=== Television ===
Muneer made her acting debut with the drama series Thoda Sa Aasmaan. Later, she appeared in Meri Subha Ka Sitara on Geo TV, Qaid-e-Tanhai, Aankh Macholi, Shehr-e-Dil Ke Darwazey, on Hum TV, Jal Pari, Ashk on Geo TV and Urdu 1's serial Meri Saheli Meri Humjoli. She also appeared in the Geo TV serials Meri Behen Maya and Daray Daray Naina. In 2018, she played the leading role in social drama Umm-e-Haniya. The same year, she portrayed the role of Ulfat in the highly acclaimed drama series Dil Mom Ka Diya, which became one of the most watched shows in the history of Pakistani television. The series earned her a nomination at the 18th Lux Style Awards for Best TV Actress. From 2019 to 2020, she appeared in Kahin Deep Jaley opposite Imran Ashraf where she portrays an innocent girl, Rida, whose cousin's jealousy and hatred caused many misfortunes and hardships for her.

In 2020, she appeared in Bikhray Moti, a serial co-produced by Humayun Saeed and Samina Humayun Saeed alongside Yasir Nawaz and Wahaj Ali. In this serial, Muneer played Ayeza, a strong and independent girl.

=== Film ===
In 2017, Muneer made her film debut with the comedy thriller Chupan Chupai opposite Ahsan Khan. Rahul Aijaz of The Express Tribune thought Muneer "serves her limited function of sprinkling masala in the film." The film earned her a nomination for Best Film Actress at the 17th Lux Style Awards. She next starred in the romantic-comedy film Wrong No. 2 opposite Sami Khan, a sequel to the 2015 film Wrong No. The film was released on Eid al-Fitr, 2019. Her performance in the film was better received. Both Chuppan Chuppai and Wrong No. 2 proved to be commercial successes. Muneer performed an item number in the film Kaaf Kangana.

In 2022, she played dual roles of twins in Yasir Nawaz's murder mystery film Chakkar.

== Personal life ==
In January 2025, Neelam tied the knot with the UAE resident, Mohammad Rashid, who works as an officer of Dubai Police’s Crime Investigation Department. They had a love marriage, and their wedding ceremony was held in Dubai, United Arab Emirates. Rashid owns businesses, including a travel and tourism agency and a few restaurants, in Dubai, where he has been residing since 2006. As per his brother Samar Ranjha, the family is originally from Mianwal Ranjha, a village in Mandi Bahauddin, Punjab, Pakistan.

== Filmography ==
=== Films ===
Year	Film	Role	Notes	Refs
2017	Chupan Chupai	Pari	Debut film	
2019	Wrong No. 2	Zoya		
2019	Kaaf Kangana	Herself	Dance performance	
2022	Chakkar	Mehreen / Zara	Dual role	

=== Television series ===
Year	Title	Role	Channel	Notes
2008	Abhi Abhi	Rida	ARY Digital	
2010	Diya Jalay	Haniya	ARY Digital	
2010	Saraab	Maham	ARY Digital	
2010	Haal-e-Dil	Muskaan	ARY Digital	
2010	Qaid-e-Tanhai	Noor	Hum TV	
2011	Shehre-Dil Kay Darwazay	Ambreen	ARY Digital	
2011	Kuch Kami Si Hai	Zareen	Geo TV	
2011	Jal Pari	Shaista	Geo TV	
2011	Meri Subh Ka Sitara	Meerab	Geo TV	
2011	Umm-e-Kulsoom	Ruqaiyya	ARY Digital	Negative Role
2011	Kuch Khawab Thay Mere	Zoha	ARY Digital	
2011	Meri Behan Maya	Zarmeen Shahzeb/Meena	Geo TV	
2011	Qurbat	Shehla	ARY Digital	
2011	Dil Ko Manana Aya Nahi	Haseena Ali	PTV Home	
2011	Band Khirkiyon K Peechay	Mahnoor	Tv One	
2011	Aisa Kyun	Fariya	A-Plus TV	
2012	Ashk	Zebunnisa/Zebu	Geo TV	
2012	Meri Saheli Meri Humjoli	Ehsas	Urdu 1	
2012	Daray Daray Naina	Aizeh	A-Plus TV	
2013	Kahani Aik Raat Ki -- Bhaagi Hui Larki	Andaleeb	ARY Digital	
2013	Arzoo Jeenay Ki Tu Nahi	Sarwat	A-Plus TV	
2013	Tere Pyar Kay Bharosay/ Kirchian	Samra	Express	
2013	Aadhay Adhooray	Muskaan	PTV Home	
2014	Mere Meherbaan	Muskaan	Hum TV	Negative Role
2014	Maang	Hira	ARY Digital	
2014	Kyun Hai Tu	Saba	Geo Kahani	
2014	Gumaan	Samiya	Express	
2014	Arrange Marriage	Roshaney	Ary Digital	
2014	Dil Ka Darwaza	Laila	Hum TV	
2014	Bhanwar	Sharmeen	Hum Sitaray	
2015	Dil Ishq	Bakhtawar	Geo Entertainment	
2015	Rang Laaga	Rizwana	ARY Digital	
2015	Kaise Huaye Benaam	Rania	Geo Entertainment	
2015	Bojh	Aizah	Geo Entertainment	
2016	Judai	Zeena	ARY Digital	
2016	Kaisi Khushi Lekar Aaya Chand	Khushi	A plus	
2016	Rab Razi	Ramla	Express	
2016	Anabiya	Anabiya	ARY Digital	
2017	Wafa Ka Mausam	Komal	Tv One	
2017	Tere Bina	Pakeezah	Geo Entertainment	
2017	Dil Nawaz	Dil Nawaz	A-Plus Entertainment	Negative Role
2018	Umm-e-Haniya	Romaisa (Roomi)	Geo Entertainment	
2018	Dil Mom Ka Diya	Ulfat	ARY Digital	Negative Role
2019	Kahin Deep Jaley	Rida	Geo Entertainment	
2020	Bikhray Moti	Aizah	ARY Digital	
2021	Qayamat	Ifrah	Geo Entertainment	
2021	Mohabbat Daagh Ki Surat	Shijrat	Geo Entertainment	
2022	Pyar Deewangi Hai	Rabi	ARY Digital	
2023	Ehraam-e-Junoon	Shanzay	Geo Entertainment	
2023	Khumar	Hareem	Geo Entertainment	
2024	Mehshar	Aima	Geo Entertainment	

=== Telefilms ===
Year	Title	Type	Role	Channel
2010	Achay Ki Larki	Telefilm		Hum TV
	Dikhawa	Eid play	Shumaila	PTV Home
2011	Main Tum Aur Imran Hashmi	Telefilm	Chanda	Hum TV
	Wafa Baloch Ki Bewafai	Telefilm	Umme Kulsoom	Hum TV
2012	Hoshiyar	Telefilm	Shaheen	Digital Entertainment World
2013	Jhonpri – A Youm-e-Pakistan Special	Telefilm		ARY Digital
2013	Ooper Gori Ka Makaan	Telefilm	Nazish	Express Entertainment
2015	Rok Do Shaadi	Telefilm	Jal-Tarang	Geo TV
2015	Maqbool Qabool Hai	Telefilm	Alina	ARY Digital
2015	Tu Hai Meri Neelam	Telefilm	Neelam	ARY Digital
2016	Van Waley Mehboob Bhai	Eid play	Nageena	ARY Digital
2016	Bekaar Bakra	Eid play	Hina	Urdu 1
2017	Ye Ishq Hai-Laaj	Telefilm	Haya	A-Plus Entertainment
2018	Shabbar Ka Tabbar	Telefilm	Amna	ARY Digital
2020	Dikhawa (BETI)	Anthology	Nimmi	Geo Entertainment

== Accolades ==
Ceremony	Category	Project	Result
17th Lux Style Awards	Best Lead Actress in a Film	Chupan Chupai	Nominated
18th Lux Style Awards	Best TV Actress	Dil Mom Ka Diya	Nominated
