= Motorcycle Girl =

- Official poster
- Directed by: Adnan Sarwar
- Written by: Adnan Sarwar
- Produced by: Adnan Sarwar; Jami
- Starring: Sohai Ali Abro; Samina Peerzada; Ali Kazmi
- Cinematography: Nabeel Jawaid Qureshi
- Edited by: Tahir Ali
- Music by: Xulfi
- Production companies: Logos Film & Media; Azad Film Company
- Distributed by: Excellency Films
- Release date: 20 April 2018 (Worldwide)
- Running time: 121 min
- Country: Pakistan
- Language: Urdu
- Budget: Rs. 20 million
- Box office: est Rs. 25 million

Motorcycle Girl is a 2018 Pakistani biographical adventure drama film based on the life of motorcyclist Zenith Irfan. Directed, written and co-produced by Adnan Sarwar, it is second installment in Sarwar's thematic Hero trilogy, following Shah (2015). The film stars Sohai Ali Abro as Zenith Irfan who travels to northern areas of Pakistan on a motorbike to fulfil her father's wish, facing many challenges along the way, with Samina Peerzada, Ali Kazmi, and Shamim Hilaly also playing supporting roles.

The film was released on 20 April 2018 nationwide. The film mostly received positive reviews from critics who praised the direction, story and performances (especially Abro's performance). At 16th Lux Style Awards, Abro received Best Actress Critics awards.

== Plot ==
An 18-years old girl (Zenith Irfan), lives in Lahore, Pakistan, with her family who becomes an overnight sensation and grabs the attention on media after she traveled on Motorcycle toward difficult and dangerous mountain areas on the Pakistan northern sides to fulfills her father's wish and became the first woman of Pakistan to travel alone to north of the country on a motorbike.

== Cast ==
- Sohai Ali Abro as Zenith Irfan
- Samina Peerzada as Zenith's mother
- Ali Kazmi as Zenith's fiancée
- Sarmad Khoosat as Zenith's boss
- Shamim Hilaly as Zenith's grandmother
- Hadi bin Arshad as Sultan; Zenith's brother
- Mehar Bano
- Khalid Butt
- Daniyal Raheel
- Mandana Zaidi
- Hani Taha as Safia
- Wajahat Malik

== Production ==
=== Development ===
After the success of Shah, director Adnan Sarwar announced in 2017, that the second film in his planned Hero trilogy would be based on the life of a motorcyclist, Zenith Irfan. Sarwar explained, "this film will be the second installment of the "Heroes Trilogy" that I have planned. Zenith's story is important because, at such a young age, she is doing things that challenge gender stereotypes which are deeply engrained in the fabric of our society. This film will be my little effort towards inspiring a future where, hopefully, the women of our country will be more empowered, truly independent and unshackled from archaic taboos that hold back their progress". Citing the inspiration of film, Adnan said, "the remarkable story of what Zenith did at such a young age caught my attention after Shah and I knew it was the right subject to turn into a film", said Adnan Sarwar. "I have scripted a fictional world around the core true story of her journey and I hope that Motorcycle Girl will help further the cause of women empowerment in Pakistan".

In an interview, Sarwar said "I think what attracted me most to this topic was the fact that at such a young age, Zenith was able to pull off such a remarkable feat. I'm a firm believer in women empowerment and gender equality and Zenith has proved that times are changing," he quipped further saying, "when I found out that the reason she made the journey was in memory of her father, I fell in love with the story completely. I have tried to treat the film with immense sensitivity and at its core; it is about a daughter's love for her father."

=== Casting ===
Actress Sohai Ali Abro was approached for the role, who was then working on a project that was shelved because of production issues. Describing her role Abro said, "I felt like I was being typecast a lot as this typically pretty, doll character on screen and I wanted to break out of my comfort zone and do something different. I went through a LOT of scripts before finally settling on this one", sharing on playing Zenith she said, "I could relate to Zenith's desire to fulfill her late father's ambitions. She grew up without a father and I too, have been through that so I could relate to her a lot."

Motorcycle Girl is believed to be the second film centered around women character after Hareem Farooq's, Parchi, commenting on that Abro said, "It is absolute honor to play Zenith in his film. The role of this incredible, empowered female is one that I can relate to and is close to my heart. I have always believed in the liberating the power of our women, especially considering the taboos we face in our society, and I am really happy that a lot of young girls would be able to look up to me for doing something positive and inspiring."

The film also stars Samina Peerzada as Abro's mother while Ali Kazmi, who plays Abro's husband a role similar he played in series, Baaghi, describing his role he said, "I wanted something light and not negative but Adnan convinced me. My character is a small part of the great ensemble cast but a pivotal one. It is an amalgamation of the interesting potential suitors of Zenith." Shamim Hilaly was cast as an Abro's grandmother, Sarmad Khoosat joined as an Abro's boss while aspiring actor Hadi bin Arshad played Abro's brother Sultan.

=== Filming ===
Principal photography began in early September 2017. The film was shot entirely in Hunza and Khunjerab, with initial scenes were filmed in Lahore. Before the shoot, Sohai went through hectic trainings as she didn't know how to drive a motorbike, and was reportedly made the same journey from Lahore to the Khanjarab Pass that Irfan's took in 2015.

== Music ==
The film score is composed and co-produced by Xulfi with Sherry Khattak. Lyrics are mostly penned down by Smai Khan and Adnan Sarwar. The first song of the film "Urr Chalay" was released on April 12, 2018. The song received critical acclaim. The second song "Pahiya" was also met with critical praise.

=== Track listing ===
No.	Title	Lyrics	Performer(s)	Length
1.	"Urr Chalay"	Sami Khan and Xulfi	Ali Noor	4:16
2.	"Pahiya"	Adnan Sarwar	Faiza Mujahid	4:06
Total length:				8:22

== Release ==
The trailer of the film was released on 25 March 2018. The film was premiered on 18 April to a selected audience at Cinepax, Lahore. The film released on 20 April nationwide. For the promotion of the film, many celebrities, post their pictures online riding bikes in support of the film including, Saba Qamar, Hamza Ali Abbasi, and Maya Ali.

=== Box office ===
Motorcycle Girl grossed Rs. 20 lac from Pakistan on its first day of release. At the end of first week, its domestic collections were around Rs. 98 lac. The film ended its run, collecting only Rs. 2.5 crores.

== Reception ==
=== Critical response ===
The trailer of the film received positive response, many citing it is groundbreaking for women empowerment. Sohai was praised for playing Zenith and many said this film is unconventional against the women-ecentirc culture of Pakistan. Sohai herself said, “the idea behind the film is to make it okay for women to ride motorcycles on the streets of Pakistan and get rid of the notion that it is something abnormal.”

On the release of the film, the film garnered a majority of positive reviews.

OyeYeah called it a film "Pakistan needs". Sahar Watoo for Daily Times said it is "an emotional, inspirational cinematic ride". Bushra Nayeem for Daily Pakistan wrote, "The issues discussed were apt and the storyline was amazing. The videography was really nice and we all can expect more good work from our industry. Sohai has done justice to her character." Shahjehan Saleem for Something Haute said, "Motorcycle Girl has done what many others have failed to do. It has proven that a female-centric film can and does work brilliantly if it's done right." Rahul Aijaz of The Express Tribune gave it a rating of 3 out of 5 and wrote, "As the late American journalist and author Hunter S Thompson once said, “Buy the ticket, take the ride.” You'll enjoy it." Maleeha Mengal of Dunya News praised the film. Turyal Azam Khan for The Diplomat wrote, "Cake and Motorcycle Girl signal a new, refreshing direction for Pakistani cinema". Sarah Babar of MangoBaaz called it "Heartfelt and extremely empowering". Omair Alavi of Samaa TV gave it a rating of 3.5/5. Anum Rehman Chagani for Dawn Images gave it 4 out of 5 stars and wrote "Motorcycle Girl is smart, funny, poignant and it delivers a touching story without any gimmicks".

=== Accolades ===
Award	Category	Recipients and nominees	Results
18th Lux Style Awards	Best Film	Adnan Sarwar	Nominated
18th Lux Style Awards	Best Actress (Critics' choice)	Sohai Ali Abro	Won
5th Galaxy Lollywood Awards	Best Film	Adnan Sarwar	Nominated
5th Galaxy Lollywood Awards	Best Director	Adnan Sarwar	Nominated
5th Galaxy Lollywood Awards	Best Story	Adnan Sarwar	Nominated
5th Galaxy Lollywood Awards	Best Actor in a Leading Role Female	Sohai Ali Abro	Nominated

== See also ==
- List of Pakistani films of 2018
