= Bojh =

Pakistani television series

- Title screen
- Genre: Social drama Family drama
- Written by: Ghazala Aziz
- Directed by: Barkat Sidiki
- Starring: Maria Wasti; Samina Ahmed; Syed Jibran; Qavi Khan; Neelam Muneer; Alyy Khan
- Opening theme: "Bojh Kandhon pe"
- Country of origin: Pakistan
- Original language: Urdu
- No. of seasons: 01
- No. of episodes: 26

Production
- Producer: A&B Entertainment
- Production locations: Karachi, Sindh
- Running time: 45-50 minutes

Original release
- Network: Geo TV
- Release: 11 May – 12 August 2015

Bojh (Urdu: بوجھ, lit. 'Burden') is a 2015 Pakistani television drama serial written by Ghazala Aziz, directed by Barkat Sidiki and produced by A&B Entertainment. The series premiered on Geo TV on 11 May 2015 and ran for 26 episodes, airing on Monday and Tuesday nights at 10:00 pm. It stars Maria Wasti, Syed Jibran, Qavi Khan, Samina Ahmed, Neelam Muneer and Alyy Khan in the principal roles.

== Plot ==
An ageing father (Qavi Khan) of modest means supports his family, three daughters and a son, on a small pension, the son has no independent source of income. The narrative follows the parents' efforts to arrange suitable marriages for their daughters and the social and financial pressures that this responsibility places upon the household.

== Cast ==
- Maria Wasti
- Samina Ahmed
- Syed Jibran
- Qavi Khan
- Neelam Muneer
- Alyy Khan
- Nausheen Shah
- Shahood Alvi
- Kanwar Arsalan
- Ayesha Khan as Ahsan's mother
- Adnan Shah Tipu
