= Extras: The Mango People =

Pakistani television series

- Intertitle
- Genre: Sitcom
- Written by: Aamra Shahid; Kashif Akram
- Directed by: Danish Nawaz
- Creative director: Sajjad Rizvi
- Starring: Danish Nawaz; Fatima Effendi; Ali Rizvi; Faheem Abbas; Gulnaar
- Opening theme: "The Mango People" or "The Common People"
- Country of origin: Pakistan
- Original language: Urdu
- No. of seasons: 2
- No. of episodes: 66

Production
- Producer: Anila Danish
- Production location: Karachi
- Editor: Mazhar Naqvi
- Running time: 17–25 minutes

Original release
- Network: Hum TV
- Release: 11 June 2011 – 29 September 2013

Extras (The Mango People) is a 2011 Pakistani sitcom produced by Anila Danish and directed by and starring Danish Nawaz . It aired on Hum TV with the first episode shown on 11 June 2011.

== Cast ==
- Danish Nawaz
- Fatima Effendi
- Anoushay Abbasi as Fouzia
- Ayeza Khan as Episodic appearance
- Humayoun Ashraf as Kami
- Faiza Hasan as Shakeela
- Ali Rizvi
- Parveen Akbar as Amma Ji
- Faheem Abbas
- Ismail Tara as Hira's father
- Anum Fayyaz as Hira
- Rubina Arif as Samina
- Kamran Jilani
- Ashraf Khan
- Benita David
- Saleem Mairaj
- Nayyar Ejaz
- Gul-e-Rana
- Syed Jibran
- Mehwish Hayat
