= Hassam Khan =

Pakistani actor

- Born: Hassam Ali Khan; 16 January 1990 (age 36); Karachi, Pakistan.
- Education: Indus Valley School of Art and Architecture

Hassam Ali Khan (born 16 January 1990), also known as Hassam Khan, is a Pakistani actor. Khan is known for his lead role of Salman in Geo TV's drama serial Noor Jahan (2016), Azher in ARY Digital's Khasara (2018) and Akmal from ARY Digital's Dil Mom Ka Dia (2018). He is from the family of Pakistani Punjabi actors Akmal Khan and M. Ajmal.

== Career ==
Khan is the eldest son of Pakistani Urdu poet Suhail Ahmed. Whilst completing his bachelors from Indus Valley School of Art and Architecture, he started his career as a theater actor in 2011 and appeared in several plays such as Come Again (2011) played the iconic role of the founder of Pakistan Mohammad Ali Jinnah in Anwar Maqsood`s Pawnay 14 August at AlHamra Arts Council, Lahore. His directorial and writing debut is a feature film Azaad (Filming) which revolves around the case of a serial killer, Talha Zulfiqar, who has killed nine people. He is also known for the lead role of Saleem in Geo TV`s Eid telefilm Nazar Ke Samnay (2015). His recent appearance was in the role of Salman in the drama serial Noor Jahan (2016) for which he lost up to fifteen kg by following a strict workout and diet routine.

== Theater ==
Year	Play	Director
2011	Come Again	Dawar Mehmood
2012	Pawnay 14 August - Karachi	Dawar Mehmood
2013	Pawnay 14 August - Lahore	Dawar Mehmood

== Filmography ==
=== Series ===
Year	Title	Role	Director	TV Channel	Note(s)
2014	Naram Garam	Jay - Jahanzaib	Najaf Bilgrami	HUM Sitaray	Sitcom
2016	Noor Jahan	Salman	Furqan Adam	Geo TV	Drama serial
2016	Mera Kya Qasoor Tha	Qasim	Navid Umer Thanvi	Geo TV	Drama serial
2017	Kaisi Yeh Paheli	Sheeraz	Faheem Burney	Urdu 1	Drama serial
2018	Khasara	Azher	Shahid Shafaat	ARY Digital	Drama serial
2018	Dil Mom Ka Diya	Akmal	Shahid Shafaat	ARY Digital	Drama serial
2020	Mohabbat Tujhe Alvida	Manzoor	Barkat Sidiki	HUM TV	Drama serial
2020	Bikhray Moti	Special Appearance	Shahid Shafaat	ARY Digital	Drama serial
2021	Paposh Nagar Ki Neelum	Aslam	Abid Raheem	Express Entertainment	Drama serial

=== Film ===
Year	Title	Writer	Director	Role	Note(s)
TBA	Azaad	Yes	Yes	Talha Zulfiqar	Filming

=== Web series ===
Year	Title	Role	Director	OTT App
2021	Karachi Division	Bilal	Shamoon Abbasi	Starzplay
2021	Naina	Rameez	Shamoon Abbasi	Deikho
2022	Mumkin	Babar	Shahid Shafaat	Starzplay

=== Telefilm ===
Year	Title	Role	Director	TV Channel	Note(s)
2014	Nain Takiya	Usman	Najaf Bilgrami	HUM Sitaray	Telefilm
2015	Nazar Ke Samnay	Saleem	Gulzaib Shakeel and Abis Zaidi	Geo TV	Telefilm
2015	Qisa Ek Gaaye Ka	Mehboob	Gulzaib Shakeel	Geo TV	Telefilm

== Awards and nominations ==
Year	Award	Category	Work	Result	Ref.
2019	Ary Digital Social Media Awards	Best New Comer	Dil Mom Ka Diya	Nominated	https://arydigital.tv/sma-2018/
2022	MLC Awards 2022	Memorable M-obster Individual Performance	Baba Jee	Won	https://www.imdb.com/title/tt19499280/awards/?ref =tt awd
