= Saat Pardon Mein =

Pakistani television drama series

- Title screen
- Genre: Family drama
- Written by: Zanjabeel Asim Shah
- Directed by: Yasir Nawaz
- Starring: Mikaal Zulfiqar; Sohai Ali Abro; Kaiser Khan Nizamani
- Country of origin: Pakistan
- Original language: Urdu
- No. of episodes: 00

Production
- Producer: Mastermind Productions
- Production location: Pakistan
- Running time: Approx 40 Minutes

Original release
- Network: Geo Entertainment
- Release: September 2012 – March 2013

Saat Pardon Mein (Urdu: سات پردوں میں, lit. 'Behind Seven Veils') was a 2012 Pakistani romantic fantasy drama serial aired on Geo TV every Friday from September 2012 to March 2013. Serial is written by Zanjabeel Asim Shah and directed by Yasir Nawaz, starring Mikaal Zulfiqar, Sohai Ali Abro and Kaiser Khan Nizamani. The serial consist of 24 episodes. According to Abro, the role that she played in Saat Pardon Mein is close to her heart as it was the one that gave her recognition in the industry.

== Plot ==
Darakhshanday Badar (Sohai Ali Abro) is a young girl who lives in Bahawalpur and belongs to a family of religious descent. Her father is a prominent religious leader and she was raised with Islamic values and norms. Darakhshanday is a big fan of a television actor Ehsan Muraad (Mikaal Zulfiqar) and tries to contact him, she gets hold of his number and calls him to tell him about his fan following Ehsan being a busy man casually thanks her. Ehsan's best friend is a television producer Badar Suleman (Alyy Khan), who is going through psychological issues, wants to change his gender.

Ehsan irritated from Darakhshanday's continuous telephone calls asks Badar to talk to her Darakhshanday who doesn't know that its Badar Suleman not Ehsan Muraad who talks to her, falls in love with him and decides to escape as her father fixes her marriage. She reaches Karachi and calls Badar to tell him that she has left her home for him, Badar tells Ehsan the whole story and takes Darakhsanday to his house.

While living at Ehsan's house Darakhshanday realizes that Ehsan only wants to use her for pleasure and would never marry her. Later, amidst their unchaste relationship, she bears his child. Once she is conscious of Ehsan and is over her infatuation, Ehsan convinces her into spending a night with her. The next morning Darakhshanday regrets on her sin and asks Ehsan to marry her which Ehsan does not approve off, he suggests a live in relationship instead. Devastated Darakhshanday leaves Ehsan's house and is found by Badar, who marries her.

== Cast ==
- Mikaal Zulfiqar as Ehsan Muraad
- Sohai Ali Abro as Darakshanday Badar
- Alyy Khan as Badar Suleman
- Tariq Jamil as Baba Jani
- Sabreen Hisbani as Gulabi
- Ismat Zaidi as Badar's Mom
- Farah Nadir as Javeria
- Kaiser Khan Nizamani as Haroon Kaka
- M. Zubair Khan as Farhan.
