= Zenith Irfan =

Long-distance motorcycle rider

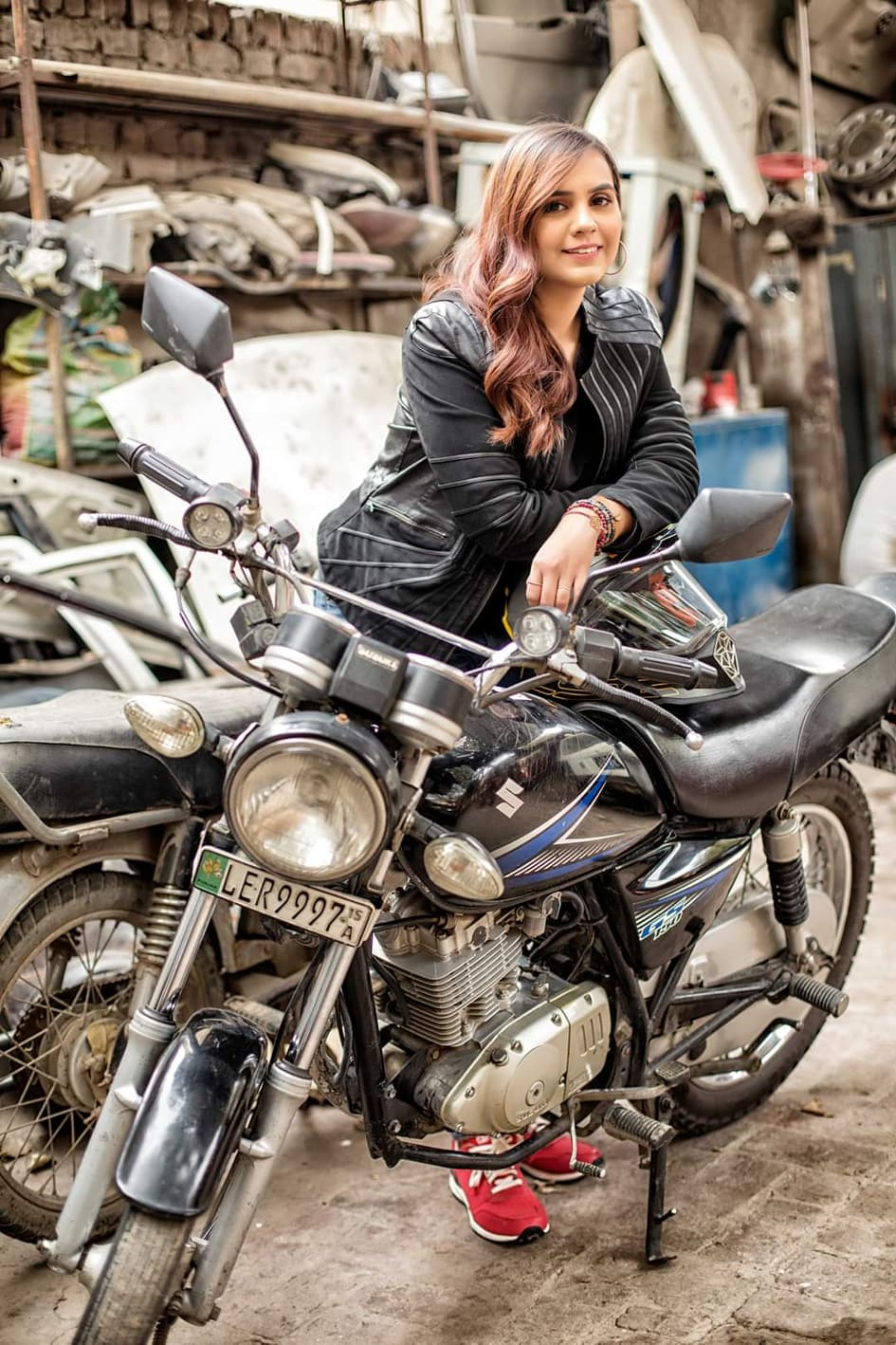
Zenith Irfan resting on her motorbike

Zenith Irfan (زینت عرفان) is the first Pakistani female motorcyclist to ride across Pakistan. Her father dreamt of traveling around the world on his motorbike, but when he died young at age 34, Zenith decided to fulfill his dream. "I did this for my father and I still do it for him. For me, going and riding across Pakistan is a spiritual endeavour," Irfan says.

== Career ==
In 2013, Sultan, Zenith's younger brother, bought a motorcycle, and Zenith started taking motorcycle lessons from him, practicing in their hometown. "I would just ride in the city and only knew the basics of riding," she says.

In August 2015, Zenith Irfan rode for 3,200 kilometers from Lahore through North Pakistan up to the Khunjerab Pass which borders China.

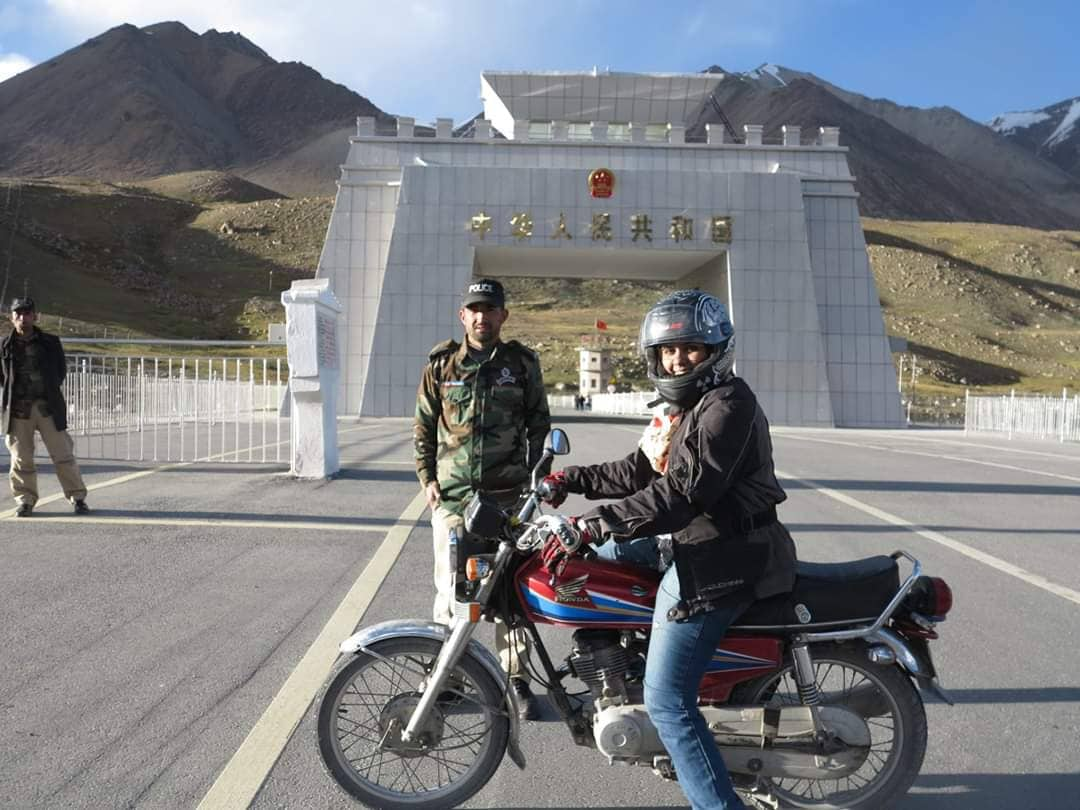
Zenith Irfan on her bike - in front of Khunjerab Pass

She is thought to be the first female motorcyclist to travel across Pakistan.

== Popular culture ==
Adnan Sarwar has made a biopic about her journey called Motorcycle Girl, which was released on 20 April 2018. Sohai Ali Abro portrays Irfan and the cast also includes Samina Peerzada and Ali Kazmi. Irfan commented that it should not be considered as just a film but rather a "dream my father saw and how he hoped to ride across the world on a motorcycle".
