= Mariyam Sultana Noohani =

Pakistani educationist and academic leader (1932–2014)

Mariyam Sultana Noohani مريم سلطانا نوحاڻي
- Born: 19 June 1932; Hyderabad, Sindh, Pakistan
- Died: 25 November 2014 (aged 82); Hyderabad
- Citizenship: Pakistani
- Education: Master of Arts in Islamic Culture
- Occupations: Educationist, Academic Leader, Teacher, Islamic Scholar and Speaker
- Spouse: Abdul Rehman Noohani
- Children: Huma Shah, Mariah Afifah, Essa Arafat
- Relatives: Ghulam Qadir Noohani (Father); Abdul Sattar Noohani (Brother); Fareed Nawaz Baloch (Brother); Nazir Baloch (Sister)
- Writing career
- Period: 1953 - 2014
- Notable awards: Khadijat-ul-Kubra Award (1962)

Mariyam Sultana Noohani (Sindhi: مريم سلطانا نوحاڻي) (19 June 1932 – 25 November 2014) was an educationist and academic leader of Hyderabad, Sindh, Pakistan. She headed All Pakistan Women's Association and the Federation of Pakistan Women Organisation. She imparted education and training especially to the girls and apprised them with the importance of schooling. She also remained associated with the Sindh Public Service Commission and the Sindh University as a subject expert. She served as director of college education of Hyderabad Region. Popularly known as "Apa Mariyam Noohani", she was awarded the title of Ummul Kalam Apa Mariyam due to her services towards education of the people of Sindh.

== Childhood and education ==
Mariyam Noohani was born on 19 June 1932 in Hyderabad Sindh, Pakistan. Her father's name was Rais Ghulam Qadir Khan Noohani who was a landlord and journalist. She had one brother and one sister. She received her primary education from New Model Girls School Gari Khato Hyderabad and passed matriculation from Maderatul Banat Girls High School Hyderabad. She also earned B.A. (Hons) in Muslim History and M.A. in Islamic Culture from University of Sindh. This was the period where women in Hyderabad were not privileged to attain education and serve the community due to the lack of resources. Whereas, Apa Mariyam, during the early phases of her career, educated and motivated many women in this region to gain education and widen their horizons. She supported them in their educational journey. She joined Shams Abbasi in campaigning for women’s education. When Shams Abbasi was appointed as the principal of Zubaida Girls College, Apa Mariyam joined as a lecturer and took responsibility to initiate Islamic lectures, extra-curricular activities, character building and training of the students. Among her students, there are famous personalities such as Mahtab Akbar Rashdi, Rubeena Qureshi, Seher Imdad, etc.

== Career ==
She started her career as a lecturer of Islamic history at Government Girls College Hyderabad in 1953. She was promoted as an assistant professor in 1958. From 24 April 1970 to 21 May 1971 she served as principal of Government Girls College Sukkur. From May 1971 to October 1972 she was a subject specialist at the Bureau of Curriculum Jamshoro. From October 1972 to October 1973 she was appointed as a professor and principal of Government Girls College Sukkur. From 8 May 1974 to 3 May 1983 she served as deputy director college education of Hyderabad region and on 26 September 1996 she joined as director of college education of Hyderabad region. She also served as principal of Zubeda Girls College Hyderabad from 1983 to 1990.

On 26 June 2014, she inaugurated a library named after her at the Govt Zubeda Girls College, which she headed as principal.

She attended All Pakistan Sirat Conferences annually for five consecutive years (during the era of Zia-ul-Haq). This is where Mariyam made an impact all over the world as a Muslim woman scholar and speaker.

She was a delegate representative of Pakistan and visited America in 1971 and Japan in 1975.

== Social ==
She was a member of Zakaat and Usher Committee which benefitted thousands of poor and needy people in province of Sindh, Pakistan.

Apa Mariyam was famous as a speaker for Milaad-Ul-Nabi. She religiously did these during the month of Rabbi-ul-Awal. During her lifetime, she actively spread Islam through her speeches neutrally to all the sects of Islam in Hyderabad.

== Death ==
She died of cardiac arrest on 25 November 2014. She has buried at the premises of Noor Shaah Shrine (Dargha) in Hyderabad.
