= Khoya Khoya Chand (TV series) =

Pakistani TV series

- Khoya Khoya Chand official logo, featuring Ahmreen (left side) and Angabeen (right side)
- Genre: Romance, Drama
- Written by: Faiza Iftikhar
- Directed by: Fahim Burney
- Starring: Maya Ali; Sohai Ali Abro; Ahsan Khan
- Theme music composer: Sohail Keys
- Opening theme: Khoya Koya Chand
- Composer: Mushroom Productions
- Country of origin: Pakistan
- Original language: Urdu
- No. of seasons: 1
- No. of episodes: 18

Production
- Producer: Ali Afzal
- Production location: Karachi islamabad
- Running time: 40-45 mins
- Production company: Mushroom Productions

Original release
- Network: Hum TV
- Release: 15 August – 26 December 2013

Related
- Dil-e-Muztar; Ru Baru

Khoya Khoya Chand (Urdu: کھویا کھویا چاند, lit. 'A Distracted Moon') is a Pakistani drama aired on Hum TV. It premiered on 15 August 2013, with Ahsan Khan, Sohai Ali Abro, Maya Ali, and Yasir Shah in the lead roles. The drama is based on Faiza Iftikhar's novel "Ye Lamhay Tere Naam Karein". It has been directed by Faheem Burney and written by Faiza Iftikhar. It aired every Thursday from 8.00 pm on Hum TV.

== Plot ==
Arib (Ahsan Khan) is an obedient and responsible son who loves his parents. He lives away from his hometown to pursue his job. Ahmareen (Maya Ali) is a college student who lives in a hostel near Arib's lodgings. Arib falls in love with her at first sight, but she leaves the hostel and returns home before he can approach her and confess his feelings. He searches for her but without success. Considering his mother's ill health, Arib feels pressurised and agrees to marry Angabeen (Sohai Ali Abro), whom he has never met before. At the wedding ceremony, he discovers that Ahmareen is his wife's younger sister, but it is too late.

Angabeen is equally unhappy with the marriage. Angabeen and her cousin Farooq (Yasir Shah) were in love with each other for years but could not marry because of conflicts between their families. Initially, both Arib and Angabeen struggle with their feelings. However, as time passes, they accept each other and grow closer. Arib discovers that Angabeen and Farooq had been in love but shows complete trust in his wife and feels touched by her commitment to their marriage. The couple is expecting their first child, and their families are excited about it. However, their lives take an unexpected turn as Angabeen dies after giving birth to a daughter. After some time, both families marry Ahmareen to Arib so the baby can grow under a mother's care. On the wedding night, Arib confesses his feelings for Ahmareen.

Ahmareen gets furious and concludes that Arib schemed to marry her after causing Angabeen's death through ill-treatment and neglect. She leaves the house before Arib can explain anything and disappears, taking the baby with her. Farooq helps Arib to track down Ahmareen and clears the misunderstandings between them. Ahmareen realises that she had overreacted and apologises. Arib and Ahmareen reconcile and begin a new life together.

== Cast ==
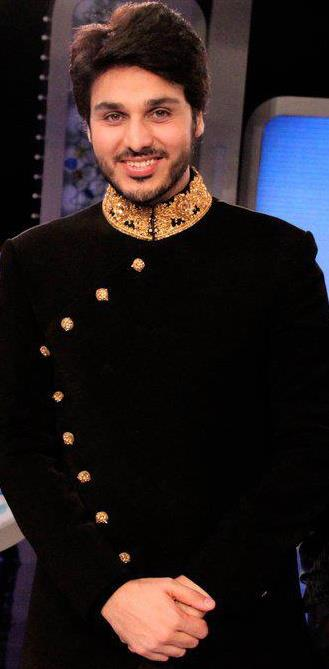
From left to right, Ahsan Khan. and Maya Ali played the leading roles respectively.
- Ahsan Khan as Arib
- Sohai Ali Abro as Angabeen
- Maya Ali as Ahmareen
- Yasir Shah as Farooq
- Ahsan Farooq
- Manzoor Qureshi as Manzoor (Angabeen and Ahmreen's father)
- Farah Nadeem as Azra (Ahmareen and Angabeen's mother)
- Humaira Zaheer as Shama (Arib's mother)
- Birjees Farooqui as Nazo
- Esha Noor as Natasha

== Soundtrack ==
Khoya Khoya Chand Original Soundtrack(OST)

Soundtrack album by Dua Malik and Ahsan Khan
- Genre: Theme song
- Length: 3:08
- Language: Urdu
- Label: Mushroom Productions
- Producer: Syed Afzal Ali

The OST of the series has been composed by Sohail Haider. Dua Malik and Ahsan Khan sang the song. Abid Wilson is on guitar. The lines play frequently during the show. Sohai Ali Abro, Maya Ali, Ahsan Khan, and Yasir Shah perform in the title song video. The OST music has two parts, "Open theme" and "End theme". Dua Malik performed the open theme, while Ahsan Khan performed the end theme. Both themes are further combined to make up the whole original OST.

Track listing
| No. | Title | Singer(s) | Length |
|---|---|---|---|
| 1. | "Mehki Mehki" | Dua Malik, Ahsan Khan | 3:08 |
| 2. | "Mehki Mehki Ye Fizayeen" | Dua Malik |
| Total length: | | | 3:08 |

== Production ==
The series was based on Faiza Iftikhar's novel "Ye Lamhay Tere Naam Karein", and Faheem Burney produced the show. The series cast Ahsan Khan, Sohai Ali Abro, Maya Ali and Yasir Shah as its main characters.

=== Making ===
The making of Khoya Khoya Chand started in June 2013, while the promos were shown during mid-July 2013. On 15 August 2013, the show aired its first episode, and ran for 18 episodes. On 26 December 2013, it aired its last episode, and was replaced by another TV series, Ru Baru.

== Release ==
=== International broadcast ===
- It was also selected for the Indian Channel Zindagi and was aired on 12 November 2015.
- The show was selected to on air on Hum Europe from 28 November 2016, Monday to Thursday at 9pm.

=== Digital release ===
Khoya Khoya Chand has been available for online streaming on the Indian OTT platform Zee5 since July 2020.
