= Sohai Ali Abro =

Pakistani actress, dancer and model

- Born: Sohai Ali Abro; 13 May 1994 (age 32); Larkana, Sindh, Pakistan
- Occupation: Actress
- Years active: 2012–present
- Works: Full list
- Spouse: Shehzar Mohammad (m. 2021)
- Children: 1

Sohai Ali Abro (Urdu: سہائی علی ابڑو Sindhi: سھائي علي ابڙو) is a Pakistani actress, dancer and model, who appears in Pakistani television serials and films. She is known for her roles in serials such as Geo TV's Saat Pardon Mein (2012), Hum TV's Tanhai (2013), Khoya Khoya Chand (2013), Rishtay Kuch Adhooray Se (2013) and ARY Digital's Pyarey Afzal (2014).

== Early life ==
Abro was born in Larkana, Sindh, to a Sindhi family. She is the youngest among three siblings and has a brother and a sister. Both her parents, who were professionally medical officers, died of natural causes, when Abro was still a nine-year old.

Abro spent her younger days in Hyderabad, Sukkur and Islamabad. Eventually, she moved to Karachi, where she pursued her studies, and later her interest in the theater made her popular with prominent names in the showbiz industry.

== Personal life ==
Abro married cricketer Shehzar Mohammad in March 2021. The couple welcomed a daughter in November 2022.

== Career ==
Abro made her acting debut in 2011 in the romance-drama Man Jali, portraying the supporting character of Gurya. She had her debut lead in the 2012 fantasy-drama Saat Pardon Mein as Darakshande Badar, the diehard fan of actor Ahsan Murad, portrayed by Mikaal Zulfiqar. She did a dance-performance for a reality show on ARY Digital's Naach which received a "lukewarm" response, mainly for the direction and the song choice that Abro and other artists danced to. She has also appeared in the telefilm Rangraiz Meray. In 2013, she appeared in Tanhai as Jiya, a lower middle-class married to a widower, played by Gohar Mumtaz.

Abro appeared in Yasir Nawaz's Anjuman, for which she was nominated for a Tarang Housefull Awards in the Best Supporting Actress category. In 2015, she made her film debut with romantic-comedy Wrong No. portraying Laila, a girl next-door. Rafay Mahmood of The Express Tribune criticizes her poorly developed character and her portrayal that "often turns out to be an out and out case of over acting." In the same year, she went on to appear in the adventure-comedy Jawani Phir Nahi Ani, marking her second cinematic outing. Abro played the role of Zoya, the spoiled and wealthy fiancée of the protagonist, portrayed by Humayun Saeed. Salima Feerasta of the DAWN Images found her "hilarious" in the film and hailed her as the "one memorable character" in the film.

In the following year, 2017, Abro starred alongside Azfar Rehman in two television projects, which went unnoticed. Her first role was in the romantic-drama Kaisi Yeh Paheli, followed by Adhi Gawahi, playing the character of Salwa Mansoor, a determined university student fighting against a forced marriage by deception by her obsessive classmate. The series marked a departure from her previous collaborations with Rehman, showcasing her in a more intense character and a complex dynamic with Rehman's character.

In 2018, she returned to cinema screens with the biographical drama Motorcycle Girl, based on the life of female motorcyclist Zenith Irfan. Sahar Wattoo of the Daily Times noted that she "worked really hard", while Rahul Aijaz of The Express Tribune stated that she "carries the entire film on her shoulders without bulging." Her performance in the film earned her a Lux Style Award for Best Film Actress - Critic's Choice.

In 2019, Abro appeared in the social drama Surkh Chandni as Aida, an acid attack survivor. In 2020, Abro appeared in the romantic-comedy Prem Gali as Joya, a college student residing in a quaint neighbourhood where she falls for her neighbour Hamza.

In 2024, she returned to television after a hiatus and appeared in the action-romance Gentleman as Mifra, the entitled daughter of a commissioner. Her next portrayal was of a victim of domestic abuse survivor desperately trying to escape in the action-thriller Faraar.

== Filmography ==
Key
†	Denotes film / series that have not yet been released

=== Films ===
Year	Title	Role	Notes	Ref(s)
2015	Wrong No.	Laila		
2015	Jawani Phir Nahi Ani	Zoya	Lux Style Award for Best Film Actress (Critic's Choice)	
2018	Motorcycle Girl	Zenith Irfan		

=== Television ===
Year	Title	Role	Network	Notes	Ref(s)
2012	Man Jali	Sania/ Gurya			
2012	Saat Pardon Mein	Darakshande Badar			
2013	Tanhai	Jehan Ara "Jiya"			
2013	Anjuman	Roodra		Remake of Anjuman	
2013	Kyun Hai Tu	Saira			
2013	Kahani Aik Raat Ki	Huma		Episodes "Daagh" and "Main Qatil Nahin"	
2013	Khoya Khoya Chand	Angabeen			
2013	Rishtay Kuch Adhooray Se	Gaiti Ara			
2013	Pyarey Afzal	Yasmeen			
2014	Bhabhi	Saba			
2014	Dhol Bajnay Laga	Sohai			
2014	De Ijazat Jo Tu	Ayla			
2015	Tumhari Natasha	Natasha			
2017	Kaise Yeh Paheli	Meeru/ Milli			
2017	Adhi Gawahi	Salwa Mansoor			
2019	Surkh Chandni	Aida			
2020	Prem Gali	Joya Hamza	ARY Digital		
2024	Gentleman	Mifra	Green Entertainment		
2024	Faraar	Nazish Akmal née Iqbal alias Baggi	Green Entertainment		
2025	Dastak	Kiran	ARY Digital		
2026	Sirf Shabana	Shabana Shameem	Hum TV		

=== Telefilms ===
Year	Title	Role	Network	Notes	Ref(s)
2012	Rangraiz Meray	Aiza			
2014	Shadi Ke Baad	Alishba			
2018	Ek Chance Pyaar Ka	Naina			
2024	Achari Mohabbat	Sana	ARY Digital		

== Awards and nominations ==
Year	Nominee / work	Award	Result	Ref.
Tarang Houseful Awards
2014	Anjuman	Best Supporting Actress	Nominated	
ARY Film Awards
2016	Jawani Phir Nahi Ani	ARY Film Award for Best Actress	Won	
2016	Wrong No.	ARY Film Award for Best Actress	Nominated	
Lux Style Awards
2016	Jawani Phir Nahi Ani	Best Supporting Actress in a Film	Nominated	
2016	Wrong No.	Best Lead Actress in a Film	Nominated	
2019	Motorcycle Girl	Best Film Actress (Critics' choice)	Won	
ARY People's Choice Awards
2021	Prem Gali	Favorite Actress in a role of Bahu	Nominated	
2021	Prem Gali	Favorite Jori (along with Farhan Saeed)	Won	
