= Pyarey Afzal =

- Title screen
- Genre: Romance; Melodrama
- Written by: Khalil-Ur-Rehman Qamar
- Directed by: Nadeem Baig
- Starring: Hamza Ali Abbasi; Ayeza Khan; Sana Javed; Sohai Ali Abro; (For entire cast see below)
- Opening theme: "Pyar Ko Pyar Mila"; Sung by Waqar Ali
- Country of origin: Pakistan
- Original language: Urdu
- No. of episodes: 37

Production
- Producer: Six Sigma Entertainment
- Production locations: Karachi, Hyderabad
- Camera setup: Multi-camera setup
- Running time: 40 minutes

Original release
- Network: ARY Digital Network
- Release: 26 November 2013 – 12 August 2014

Pyarey Afzal or Pyaare Afzal (Urdu: پیارے افضل) (English: Dear Afzal), is a 2013 Pakistani romantic melodrama television serial that aired on ARY Digital. Directed by Nadeem Baig and written by Khalil-ur-Rehman Qamar, the drama was produced by Humayun Saeed and Shazad Nasib's Six Sigma Entertainment. The drama starred Hamza Ali Abbasi and Ayeza Khan in the lead roles.

Often cited as one of the greatest Pakistani dramas of all time, Pyarey Afzal won many people's choice awards from Dawn readers in 2014. At the annual Lux Style Awards, Pyarey Afzal won five awards from seven nominations, including Best TV Play, Best Director for Baig, Best Actor for Abbasi and Best Actress for Khan. Pyaray Afzal also aired in India on the Zindagi Channel under the same name. The Express Tribune stated Indian viewers liked "The script, dialogue delivery, background score and overall finesse".

== Plot ==
The story starts in the city of Hyderabad, where the protagonist, Afzal Sub'han Allah (Hamza Ali Abbasi), son of Maulvi Sub'han Allah (Firdous Jamal), is playing cricket. Afzal spends his time playing sports, cards, and betting, which his father despises. He has a crush on his neighbour, Farah Ibrahim (Ayeza Khan), the cotton mill owner Sheikh Ibrahim's daughter, and claims to receive letters from Farah, which he reads in front of his friends, although he refuses to disclose the name of the girl.

Afzal worked at Farah's father's office as a clerk for a brief period. Farah, on the other hand, is to marry Mehtab Chawla (Umer Naru), a family friend whom she does not want to marry. Farah, along with her sister Lubna (Sana Javed), hires Afzal to be Farah's love interest so that she can convince her parents that she loves another person, which they succeed in doing. Meanwhile, Afzal falls in love with Farah, and his sister (Anoushay Abbasi) convinces his parents to take a marriage proposal to Farah's parents. In the family meeting, Farah humiliates and insults Afzal. Heartbroken Afzal leaves Hyderabad for Karachi, vowing to never return.

Afzal arrives in Karachi and lives with Babu Hameed (Alie Sheikh) in a rented room. The house is owned by a landlady and her daughter Yasmeen (Sohai Ali Abro). Afzal witnesses an incident in which Wali, Yasmeen's gangster cousin, harasses her to marry him. Afzal fights Wali, who vows to take revenge, and returns after a few days with his men and shoots Afzal. Yasmeen is moved by what Afzal has done for her and falls in love with him.

Farah along with her family reach Karachi to take him back. She meets Yasmeen and finds out that she loves Afzal. Wali, taking advantage of Afzal's absence, comes to Yasmeen's house again. Babu Hameed attempts to shoot Wali but gets shot instead. Afzal receives the news of Babu Hameed's death and decides to take revenge. Ibrahim brings Afzal with him and informs Afzal's parents that he found him and tells them to come, but he runs away before they meet him. Undercover police get interested in Afzal and decide to hire him as a vigilante and pay him to create a gang that targets killing the criminals. Their first target was Wali who was assassinated.

Afzal becomes an infamous gangster, and nobody knows that he actually works for the undercover police. Meanwhile, Farah's, psychologist, Dr. Sibtain, proposes to Farah, who agrees reluctantly. When Afzal is informed, he also decides to get engaged with Yasmeen on the same day as Farah's engagement. Farah's engagement is cancelled when Maulvi Subhanullah has a heart attack. When Afzal hears about his father's heart attack, he returns to Hyderabad with Yasmeen. Afzal's parents are initially reluctant to accept him, but Yasmeen successfully resolves his issues with his parents.

Afzal receives a call from the undercover police to resume his target killing, but he informs them that he no longer wants to be their target killer. Yasmeen is curious about the Farah who writes letters to Afzal. Afzal, unable to express his feelings to Farah, had written letters from Farah to himself. Yasmeen goes to Farah and confronts her. She realizes that Farah is also in love with Afzal. She breaks her engagement with Afzal and decides to go back. Farah calls Afzal and admits that she loves him. The police shoot Afzal while they are having this conversation because he had left the undercover police and they had warned him a long time ago that he could not leave his post. As Farah confesses to loving him, Afzal succumbs to his bullet wounds and the drama ends.

== Cast ==
=== Main ===
- Hamza Ali Abbasi as Afzal Sub'han Allah : Sub'han Allah and Ruqaiyya's son; Arfa's brother; Yasmeen's ex fiancé; Farah's love interest.
- Ayeza Khan as Farah Ibrahim : Ibrahim and Irsa's daughter; Lubna's sister; Mehtab and Sibtain's ex fiancée; Afzal's love interest
- Sana Javed as Lubna Ibrahim : Ibrahim and Irsa's daughter; Farah's sister
- Sohai Ali Abro as Yasmeen : Afzal's ex fiancée

=== Recurring ===
- Saba Hameed as Ruqaiyya Sub'han Allah : Sub'han Allah's wife; Afzal and Arfa's mother
- Firdous Jamal as Maulvi Sub'han Allah : Ruqaiyya's husband; Afzal and Arfa's father
- Aliee Shaikh as Babu Hameed : Afzal's friend
- Anoushey Abbasi as Arfa Sub'han Allah : Sub'han Allah and Ruqaiyya's daughter; Afzal's sister
- Saba Faisal as Irsa Ibrahim : Ibrahim's wife; Farah and Lubna's mother
- Shehryar Zaidi as Sheikh Ibrahim : Irsa's husband; Farah and Lubna's father
- Farah Nadeem as Yasmeen's mother
- Vasay Chaudhry as Dr. Sibtain : Farah's ex fiance
- Umer Naru as Mehtab Chawla : Farah's ex fiancé; Shagufta's son
- Birjees Farooqui as Shagufta Chawla : Mehtab's mother
- Malik Raza as Wali : Yasmeen's cousin
- Saqib Sameer as Babloo : Afzal's friend

== Soundtrack ==
"Pyar Ko Pyar Mila"

Song by Waqar Ali
- Language: Urdu
- Genre: Theme song
- Length: 3:16
- Producer: Six Sigma Entertainment

The title song of the series "Pyar Ko Pyar Mila" is a remix of a song of the same name from the 1967 Bollywood film Pyaasa.

Track list
No.	Title	Singer(s)	Length
1.	"Pyar Ko Pyar Mila"	Waqar Ali	3:16

== Reception ==
=== Critical reception ===
While reviewing the series, Dawn praised the female portrayal and dialogues but mentioned some writing faux.

In July 2017, it was listed among the 10 iconic Pakistani TV dramas by DAWN Images.

== Accolades ==
Award	Category	Recipient(s) and nominee(s)	Result	Ref(s)
Lux Style Awards	Best Television Play		Won	
Lux Style Awards	Best Television Director	Nadeem Baig	Won	
Lux Style Awards	Best Television Actor	Hamza Ali Abbasi	Won	
Lux Style Awards	Best Television Actor	Firdous Jamal	Nominated	
Lux Style Awards	Best Television Actress	Ayeza Khan	Won	
Lux Style Awards	Best Television Actress	Saba Hameed	Nominated	
Lux Style Awards	Best Television Writer	Khalil-ur-Rehman Qamar	Won	
