= Khasara =

2018 Pakistani television series

- Left to right: Sonia Mishal, Junaid Khan, Mikaal Zulfiqar, Sarwat Gillani
- Genre: Serial drama; Romantic drama; Teen drama
- Written by: Maha Malik
- Directed by: Shahid Shafaat
- Starring: Mikaal Zulfiqar; Sarwat Gilani; Junaid Khan; Sonia Mishal
- Opening theme: Khasara Kar Baithey Hain Singer(s) Rahat Fateh Ali Khan
- Country of origin: Pakistan
- Original language: Urdu
- No. of seasons: 1
- No. of episodes: 27

Production
- Producer: Six Sigma Plus

Original release
- Network: ARY Digital
- Release: 10 April – 21 August 2018

Khasara (Urdu: خسارا; transl. Loss) is a Pakistani romantic drama that first aired on ARY Digital in 2018. It focuses on four characters who are initially friends, but then get intertwined into a relation which is closer than friends – an affair of money in the name of love. The show has gained critical acclaim for its storyline. The show aired Tuesday evenings (switched to Thursday evenings in Ramzan) in a double-episode (two episodes at once) format.

== Plot ==
Sila and Moonis are a simple couple who live in a simple part of Karachi. Sila wants a lavish lifestyle and chases her upscale desires. Moonis is a railway employee who is content with the way his life is. Moonis' childhood best friend Mohtasim and wife Linta come to visit. Mohtasim is a rich businessman who is a playboy and flirts with every woman. His wife Linta is spoiled and loves to brag about how rich she is. Mohtasim and Linta visit Sila and Moonis and spoil the couple – getting gifts for them, their kids and giving money. Mohtasim begins to flirt with Sila knowing he can get her. Sila is falling for him, and gets conflicted as to what she should do. She now wants to be with Mohtasim since he has a lot of money to support her lavish dreams. Slowly, Sila and Mohtasim begin dating. Moonis learns about their affair and is heartbroken but decides to let her leave. Sila settles down with Mohtasim, and enjoys the new luxury lifestyle. They face issues as they demand child's custody from Moonis as well as Linta's behaviour with Sila. One evening, a drunk Mohtasim meets a car accident and dies. Linta informs this to Sila and she cries and regrets. Sila goes back to Moonis who still loves her somehow but is reluctant to start life all over again with her. Sila goes to pray at a dargah where she spends hours crying and telling herself that Moonis may be not so well-off, but his love was unconditional. Realising that she can't make up for this loss, khasara, she slowly dies.

== Cast ==
- Mikaal Zulfiqar as Mutasim
- Sarwat Gilani as Linta
- Junaid Khan as Moonis
- Sonia Mishal as Sila
- Hassam Khan as Azhar
- Kiran Ashfaq as Areeba
- Hajra Khan as Arzoo
- Kashef Shahan

== Title song ==
The title song was sung by Rahat Fateh Ali Khan. The music was composed by Soch Band and the lyrics were written by Adnan Dhool.

== International release ==
The show was dubbed in Arabic and is available as VOD on shahid.net by the title خسارة.

== Awards and nominations ==
Year	Award	Category	Recipient(s)	Result	Ref.
2019	ARY Digital- Social Media Drama Awards 2018	Best Drama Serial -2018	Khasara	Nominated	
2019	ARY Digital- Social Media Drama Awards 2018	Best Actor Male (Serial)	Mikaal Zulfiqar	Nominated	
2019	ARY Digital- Social Media Drama Awards 2018	Best Supporting Actor (Male)	Junaid Khan	Nominated	
2019	ARY Digital- Social Media Drama Awards 2018	Best Negative Actor (Male)	Mikaal Zulfiqar	Nominated	
2019	ARY Digital- Social Media Drama Awards 2018	Best OST	Khasara	Nominated	
2019	ARY Digital- Social Media Drama Awards 2018	Best Director	Shahid Shafaat	Nominated	
