= Meri Behan Maya =

2011–2012 Pakistani drama serial

- Also known as: Maya
- Genre: Romantic; Drama; Mystery
- Written by: Haseena Moin
- Directed by: Azfar Ali
- Starring: Neelam Muneer; Ainy Jaffri; Danish Taimoor; Javed Sheikh; Bindiya
- Narrated by: Neelam Muneerh
- Theme music composer: Mehwish Hayat
- Opening theme: "Tell Me Why" by Mehwish Hayat
- Composer: Waqar Ali
- Country of origin: Pakistan
- Original language: Urdu
- No. of episodes: 20

Production
- Producer: Khurram Raza
- Running time: 35 minutes

Original release
- Network: Geo Entertainment
- Release: 17 September 2011 – 11 January 2012

Meri Behan Maya (Urdu: میری بہن مایا, lit. 'My Sister Maya') is a 2011 Pakistani TV romantic drama serial broadcast by Geo TV. It was first aired on 17 September 2011. The serial was directed by Azfar Ali, and the project head was Iqbal Ansari. It was written by Haseena Moin, and the cast included Neelam Muneer, Annie Jaffrey, Danish Taimoor and Javed Sheikh.

The show was broadcast in India on Zindagi, and aired on 12 January 2015, under the title Maya.

== Plot ==
Maya (Jaffrey) and Zarmeena (Muneer) are sisters who love each other dearly. Their father, Shazeb Khan (Shaikh), loves them dearly, but their stepmother Attiya (Bindiya) dislikes them, especially Maya. She tries to create problems for Maya as she is not the real daughter of Shazeb Khan. Meanwhile, Zarmeena is in love with Faizar (Taimoor) and plans to marry him. Things take a turn for the worse when Attiya conspires with her son Rashid (Zarrar Khan) and kidnaps her. Maya finds out about Rashid's conspiracy as he "deals" with girls and sells them to a brothel, and when she finds this, she attacks Rashid and runs away. She takes refuge in her friend's house Zeb (Amna Karim). Zeb was also a victim of Rashid's web. She tries to help Maya to face her fears. Faizar's parents break off the engagement with Zarmeena as Faizar's father knows that Attiya is a courtesan. Angered, Faizar leaves the house after the argument with his father. Rashid gets arrested and interrogated by police on orders of Shazeb. Attiya, who bails out Rashid, divorces Shazeb and threatens to destroy him. Maya soon gets a job as a Hotel Manager. After finding out that she is Shazeb's illegitimate child, she starts hating him and runs away. Shazeb has a stroke and is hospitalized. Soon after recovering, he finds Maya. She has been kidnapped again by Rashid, who threats Maya to ruin her face with acid. Attiya wants all of Rashid's cases to be withdrawn. Rashid leaves Maya after Shazeb withdraws the case. Rashid gets killed by police after he tries to kill Maya. Maya returns home safely and reconciles with her sister, and Faizar's father stops him from leaving. Faizar marries Zarmeena, and Maya playfully teases Faizar.

== Cast ==
- Neelam Muneer as Zarmeena
- Ainy Jaffri as Maya
- Danish Taimoor as Faizar
- Javed Sheikh as Shahzeb Khan
- Bindiya as Attiya Shahzeb
- Shamim Hilaly as Khala
- Farah Nadeem as Salma
- Zarrar Khan as Rashid
- Sanam Khan as Naima
- Amna Karim as Zeb
- Humaira Zahid as Alam Aara
- Saima Kanwal as Safiya
- Anees Alam as Shafiq

== Soundtrack ==
Tell Me Why

Soundtrack album by Mehwish Hayat
- Genre: Theme song
- Length: 4:32
- Language: Urdu
- Producer: SP 1

Meri Behan Maya's title song Tell Me Why is sung by Mehwish Hayat, composed by Waqar Ali and lyrics by Muhammad Nasir. The song of this drama serial became immensely popular due to its different lyrics and catchy music. The lines of the song are frequently used during the course of the show.

Track list
No.	Title	Singer(s)	Length
1.	"Tell Me Why"	Mehwish Hayat	4:32
