= Nida Yasir =

Pakistani actor-model

- Born: Karachi, Pakistan
- Occupations: Actress, Television presenter
- Spouse: Yasir Nawaz (m. 2002)
- Parent: Kazim Pasha (father) Fehmida Nasreen (mother)
- Relatives: Fareed Nawaz Baloch (father-in-law); Danish Nawaz (brother-in-law); Sawera Pasha (sister)

Nida Pasha, better known as Nida Yasir, born in 1979 is a Pakistani television host, former actress, and model known for her role as Saima in the television drama Hum Tum. She also hosts the morning television show Good Morning Pakistan at ARY Digital.

== Family ==
She is the daughter of television directors and producers Kazim Pasha and Fehmida Nasreen.

She married Yasir Nawaz, an actor, director and producer, in 2002. They have three children together.

== Career ==
Yasir started her career as a producer and model. Later, she joined ARY Digital when Shaista Wahidi accepted an offer from Geo TV for a morning show and left ARY Digital. She has been hosting the morning show Good Morning Pakistan on ARY Digital since 2011. She also works on drama serials on different TV channels.

In 2015, Yasir produced her first feature film, Wrong No., directed and produced by her husband Yasir Nawaz.

== Controversies ==
In 2015, Yasir invited fellow actor Shabbir Jan on her show, and during a game show, he caused him to storm out, prompting the other guest Saud to go after him. Yasir later claimed that this was an act propagated to boost show ratings.

In 2020, in an interview with the parents of a rape victim, Yasir asked the couple insensitive questions regarding the rape and eventual murder. This was met with widespread criticism, with the hashtag #BanNidaYasir trending on Pakistani Twitter-space.

Nida Yasir generated further controversy in 2021 when a 2016 clip from her morning show went viral on the internet. In the interview, she displayed a lack of background research by repeatedly asking questions that undermined the achievements of her guests, who were graduate students going to Formula Student USA.

In December 2025, Nida Yasir sparked controversy by accusing food delivery drivers of avoiding to carry change to get more tips. The comments were widely criticized, with many defending the riders and highlighting their difficult working conditions. The incident has sparked a broader discussion about the treatment of delivery workers in Pakistan.

== Television ==
=== Host ===
- Good Morning Pakistan
- Shan-e-Suhoor

=== Producer ===
- Baal Baal Bach Gaye

=== Acting ===
Year	Title	Network
1999	Mera Ghar Aik Whirlpool	PTV
2001	Sub Set Hai	Indus Vision
2002	Jannat	PTV
2009	Nadaaniyaan	Geo TV
2010	Hum Tum	Geo TV
2013	Yeh Zindagi Hai	Geo TV

== Films ==
=== As producer ===
- Wrong No. (2015)
- Mehrunisa V lub u (2017)
- Wrong No. 2 (2019)

== Awards ==
- Pakistan Media Award 2012 - Best morning show host Good Morning Pakistan
- Pakistan Achievement Awards 2019 - Best Morning Show Host Good Morning Pakistan
