= Daray Daray Naina =

- Cover
- Genre: Drama
- Written by: K Rehman
- Directed by: Dilawar Malik
- Starring: Babar Ali; Sami Khan; Mehmood Aslam; Neelam Munir; Zhalay Sarhadi; Shahood Alvi
- Theme music composer: Owais Masood
- Opening theme: written by Sabir Zafar performed by Shreya Ghoshal
- Country of origin: Pakistan
- Original language: Urdu
- No. of episodes: 10

Production
- Producers: Chaudhry Muhammad Arshad; Chauhdhry Muhammad Ashraf
- Production location: Thailand

Original release
- Network: A-Plus Entertainment
- Release: 6 November 2012

Daray Daray Naina (or spelled as Dare Dare Naina) (Urdu: ڈرے ڈرے نیناں, lit. 'Apprehensive eyes') is a 2012 Pakistani drama serial broadcasting on A-Plus Entertainment every Tuesday. The serial is written by K Rehman and directed by Dilawar Malik, starring Babar Ali, Sami Khan, Neelam Munir, Mehmood Aslam, Zhalay Sarhadi and Shahood Alvi. It was first aired on 6 November 2012.

== Cast ==
- Sami Khan as Razim
- Babar Ali
- Neelam Munir
- Mehmood Aslam
- Zhalay Sarhadi
- Shahood Alvi
- Taifoor Khan
- Anita Kampher
- Sataish Khan
- Imran Ashraf
