= Fareed Nawaz Baloch =

Pakistani television and radio artist

- فريد نواز بلوچ
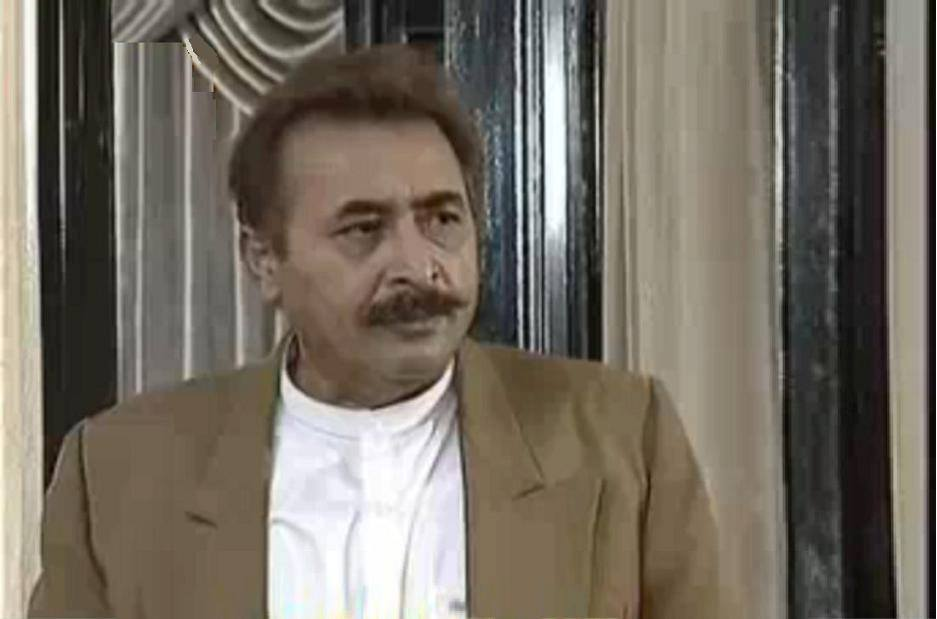
- Born: 9 September 1946; Hyderabad, Sindh, Pakistan
- Died: 15 December 2001 (aged 55); Karachi, Pakistan
- Occupation: Actor
- Years active: 1970–2001
- Children: Yasir Nawaz (son); Danish Nawaz (son)
- Father: Rais Khan Muhammad Noohani Baloch

Fareed Nawaz Baloch (Urdu: فريد نواز بلوچ; 9 September 1946 – 15 December 2001) was a Pakistani television and radio actor.

== Early life ==
Fareed Nawaz Baloch was born on 9 September 1946 in Hyderabad, Sindh. His father, Rais Khan Muhammad Noohani, died before his birth. Fareed Nawaz was raised by his uncle, Rais Ghulam Qadir Noohani. The educationist Mariyam Sultana Noohani was his cousin. After completing his degree, he worked at the Hyderabad Chamber of Commerce.

== Acting career ==
Fareed Nawaz began his acting career at Radio Pakistan's Hyderabad station. He was subsequently introduced to Pakistan Television by Abdul Karim Baloch. He appeared in more than 100 television plays over the course of his career, including the drama serials Dewarain and Jungle.

=== Urdu plays and serials ===
- Aaj Kay Afsanay (Urdu: آج کے افسانے)
- Deewaren (Urdu: دیواریں)
- Do Suraj (Urdu: دو سورج)
- Hawain (Urdu: ہوائیں)
- Jangloos (Urdu: جانگلوس)
- Jungle (Urdu: جنگل)
- Chand Grahan (Urdu: چاند گرہن)

=== Sindhi plays and serials ===
He appeared in a number of Sindhi-language plays and serials produced by PTV, including:

- Baakh (Sindhi: باک)
- Dunya Deewani (Sindhi: دنيا ديواني)
- Karo Kari (Sindhi: ڪاروڪاري)
- Milkyat (Sindhi: ملڪيت)
- Nibero (Sindhi: نبيرو)
- Rania Ji Kahani (Sindhi: راڻيءَ جي ڪھاڻي)
- Zeenat (Sindhi: زينت)

== Death ==
Fareed Nawaz Baloch died of heart failure in Karachi on 15 December 2001. He was survived by his wife, three sons, and a daughter.
