= Danish Nawaz =

Pakistani television and film actor, director, and comedian

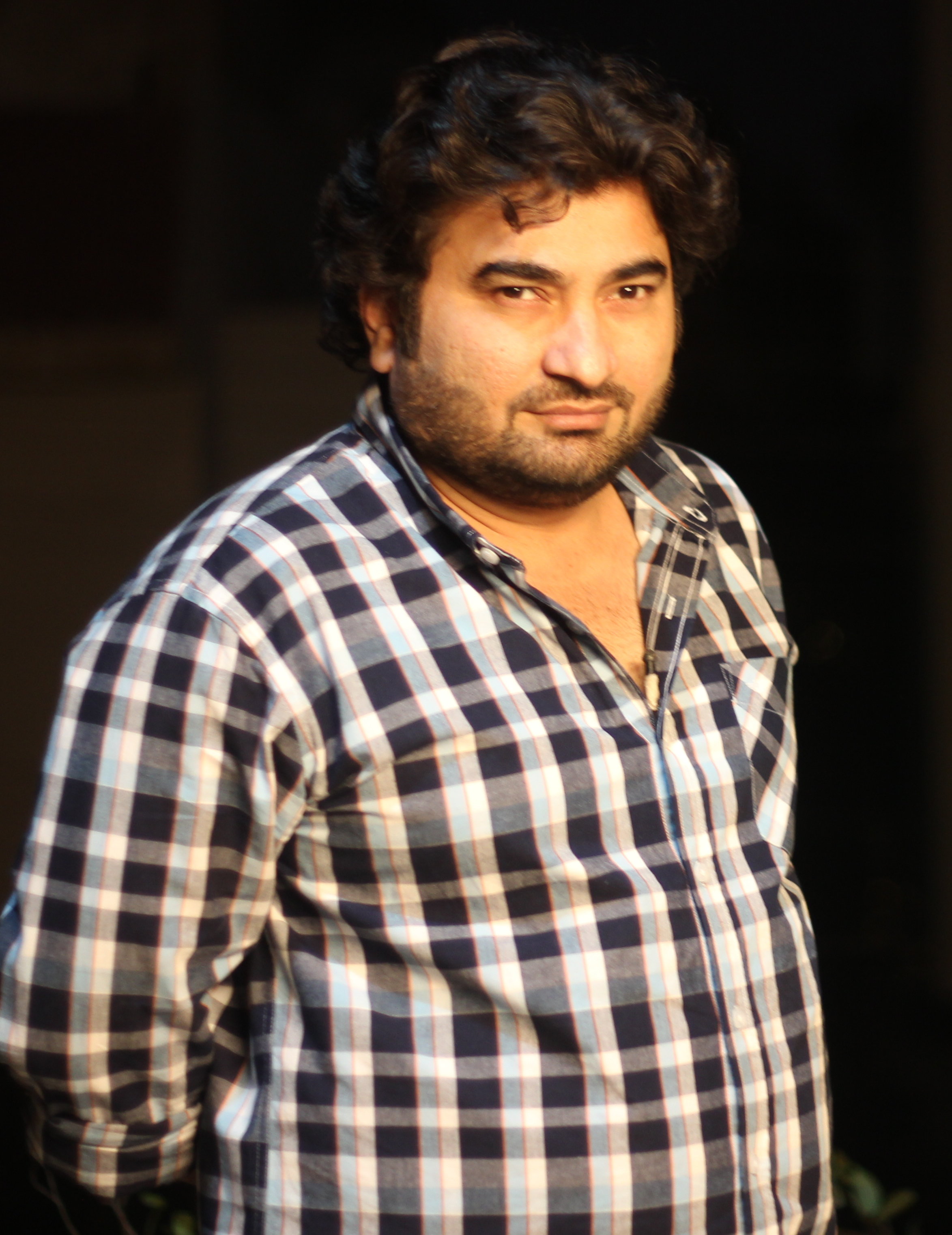
- Born: Danish Nawaz Baloch; 4 August 1978 (age 48); Hyderabad, Sindh, Pakistan
- Occupations: Actor; Director; Comedian
- Years active: 2001 – present
- Known for: Extras The Mango People, Nadaaniyan
- Spouse: Anila Danish
- Father: Fareed Nawaz Baloch
- Relatives: Yasir Nawaz (brother)

Danish Nawaz Baloch (Urdu: دانش نواز بلوچ; born 4 August 1978) is a Pakistani actor, director and comedian.

The son of the late senior actor Fareed Nawaz Baloch and brother to actor-director Yasir Nawaz, Danish has established a career in Pakistani television where he is mostly known as a comedian.

As an actor, Danish is best known for his lead comedy roles in television serials such as Nadaniyan (2009), Extras: The Mango People (2011), Larka Karachi Ka Kuri Lahore Di (2012) and Hum Sab Ajeeb Se Hain (2016).

As a director, he is famous for his light rom-com television serials such as Chupke Chupke (2021) and Hum Tum (2022).

== Career ==
He began his career in 2001 with a cameo in the Indus Vision serial Sab Set Hai, while he was studying engineering at university. Later, he completed his Mechanical Engineering degree from the Mehran University of Engineering & Technology, Hyderabad, Pakistan.

In an interview with The Express Tribune, when asked how it feels to bound yourself with one genre, Nawaz said "I present myself as a comedy actor and I have no issues with doing comedy roles only. I'd rather do something that I'm really good at than do something so many other people are doing."

=== Directorial influences ===
As a director, Nawaz' cinematic style is shaped by a diverse array of international filmmakers. As he said in an interview, his romantic storytelling draws heavily from the nuanced work of Indian director Imtiaz Ali, while the sweeping visual grandeur of Sanjay Leela Bhansali serves as a key inspiration for the aesthetic vision. Additionally, he cites Iranian filmmaker Majid Majidi for his masterful, grounded storytelling techniques and James Cameron for his rigorous attention to detail and technical innovation.

== Filmography ==
=== Television serials ===
Year	Title	Actor	Director	Channel	Ref(s)
1997	Ye Zindgi	Yes	No	PTV	
2001	Sab Set Hai	Yes	No	Indus Vision	
2003	Aanchal	Yes	No	PTV	
2003	Lush	Yes	Yes	KTN	
2008	Chaar Chaand	Yes	No	Geo Entertainment	
2009	Tanveer Fatima (B.A)	Yes	No	Geo Entertainment	
2009	Nadaaniyaan	Yes	No	Geo Entertainment	
2009	Masub Ki Dil Lagi	Yes	No	ARY Digital	
2009	Baarh	Yes	No	PTV	
2010	Karwatain	Yes	No	ARY Digital	
2010	Hum Tum	Yes	No	Geo Entertainment	
2011	Extras (The Mango People)	Yes	Yes	Hum TV	
2011	Phir Chand Pe Dastak	Yes	No	Hum TV	
2012	Larka Karachi Ka Kuri Lahore Di	Yes	Yes	Express Entertainment	
2012	Mr. Mom	Yes	Yes	Express Entertainment	
2013	Siskiyaan	No	Yes	ARY Digital	
2014	Jalebiyan	No	Yes	Geo Entertainment	
2014	Dramay Baziyan	Yes	Yes	Hum TV	
2014	Jakaria Kulsoom Ki Love Story (season 1)	Yes	Yes	Express Entertainment	
2016	Jakaria Kulsoom Ki Love Story (season 2)	Yes	Yes	Express Entertainment	
2016	Hum Sab Ajeeb Se Hain	Yes	No	Aaj Entertainment	
2016	Nok Jhok	Yes	Yes	ARY Digital	
2017	Sun Yaara	No	Yes	ARY Digital	
2017	Paimanay	Yes	Yes	Urdu1	
2018	Kabhi Band Kabhi Baja	Yes	No	Express Entertainment	
2018	Ishq Tamasha	No	Yes	Hum TV	
2019	Khaas	Yes	Yes	Hum TV	
2020	Kashf	No	Yes	Hum TV	
2021	Chupke Chupke	No	Yes	Hum TV	
2021	Dobara	No	Yes	Hum TV	
2022	Hum Tum	No	Yes	Hum TV	
2022	Kaala Doriya	No	Yes	Hum TV	
2023	Chand Tara	Yes	Yes	Hum TV	
2024	Jafaa	No	Yes	Hum TV	
2025	Sanwal Yaar Piya	No	Yes	Geo Entertainment	
2026	Winter Love	No	Yes	Hum TV	

=== Television shows ===
Year	Title	Role	Channel	Note
2004	Fun House	Host	KTN	Musical show
2023	The Shoaib Akhtar Show	Guest	UrduFlix	

=== Telefilms ===
Year	Title	Actor	Director	Channel
2008	Babu Jee Dheeray Chalna	Yes	No	Geo TV
2008	Shali	No	Yes	Hum TV
2010	Miss Garam Masala	No	Yes	Hum TV
2011	Shadi Ka Chand	Yes	No	Geo TV
2011	Phuppi Ka Ladka Ya Khala Ka Ladka	Yes	No	ARY Digital
2012	O Meri Billi	Yes	Yes	Hum TV
2014	Main Bhi Tha Tiger	Yes	Yes	Geo TV
2016	Jakaria Kulsoom Ki Bari Eid	Yes	Yes	Express Entertainment
2020	Dr. Balma	No	Yes	Hum TV
2023	Khul Gayee Qismat	Yes	No	ARY Digital
2024	Jhoota Kahin Ka	Yes	Yes	ARY Digital
2025	Dil Ne Kaha Dil Se	Yes	No	Geo TV

=== Films ===
Year	Title	Role
2015	Wrong No.	Bali
2017	Chain Aye Na	
2019	Wrong No.2	Sexy Shaukat
2022	Chakkar	Director

=== Web series ===
Year	Title	Actor	Director	Platform	Notes
2022	Phir Say Nadaaniyan	Yes	No	Farid Nawaz Productions on YouTube	Nadaaniyan spin-off

== Awards and nominations ==
	Ceremony	Category	Project	Result
2013	1st Hum Awards	Best Comic Actor	Extras (The Mango People)	Nominated
2013	1st Hum Awards	Best Comic Sitcom	Extras (The Mango People)	Won
2014	2nd Hum Awards	Best Comic Sitcom	Extras (The Mango People)	Won
2015	3rd Hum Awards	Best Comic Sitcom	Dramay Baziyan	Nominated
2016	2nd ARY Film Awards	Best Actor in a Comic Role	Wrong No.	Nominated
