= Hum Tum (2010 TV series) =

- Opening title screen
- Genre: Drama; Comedy
- Written by: Khurram Fareed
- Directed by: Rana Rizwan
- Starring: Atiqa Odho; Sajid Hasan; Mohib Mirza; Aamina Sheikh; Sawera Pasha; Muhammad Yasir; Aliya Fatima; Shuja Dhedhi
- Opening theme: Hum Tum Kho Naa Jain by Azal Band
- Country of origin: Pakistan
- Original language: Urdu
- No. of episodes: 15

Production
- Producers: Nida Yasir; Yasir Nawaz
- Production company: Fareed Nawaz Productions

Original release
- Network: Geo Entertainment
- Release: 26 October 2010 – 1 February 2011

Hum Tum (Urdu: ہم تم) is a Pakistani television serial which premiered on Geo Entertainment on 26 October 2010 and ended on 1 February 2011. It is directed by Rana Rizwan, written by Khurram Fareed, and produced by Yasir Nawaz and wife Nida Yasir's production house, Fareed Nawaz Productions. The official soundtrack, which also served as a background score, is called Hum tum kho na jayain, composed and performed by Azal The Band, originally released in 2008.

== Cast and characters ==
=== Main cast ===
- Atiqa Odho as Shagufta. Marriages: 1st - Bilal; 2nd Asif.
- Sajid Hasan as Asif Mir. Marriage: 2nd - Shagufta
- Mohib Mirza as Ali, Asif's elder son
- Aamina Sheikh as Amal as Shagufta's elder daughter.
- Sawera Pasha as Sanam, Shagufta's younger daughter.
- Muhammad Yasir as Mekaal
- Shuja Dhedhi as naiel, Asif’s younger son.

=== Supporting cast ===
- Tanveer Jamal as Bilal, Shagufta's first husband
- Yasir Nawaz as Faraz
- Nida Yasir as Saima
- Gul-e-Raana as Faraz's mother
- Aliya Fatima as amal's childhood
- Shuja Dhedhi as Naiel

=== Notable guest stars ===
- Danish Nawaz as Danish (appeared in the last episode)

== Plot ==
Asif (Sajid Hasan) and Shagufta (Atiqa Odho) meet each other after a long time and come to know about each other’s circumstances. Shagufta’s husband, Bilal (Tanveer Jamal) a raging alcoholic, divorced her a while back while Asif has been a widower since his wife died giving birth to their third child, Nail. Shagufta also has three children, two daughters and a son, from her previous marriage and that is the reason her ex-husband keeps harassing and calling her up. Shagufta who has been living for her kids all this time, decides to marry Asif. They both take their children out for a dinner to break the news. Their young ones make peace with this new development pretty quickly after showing a minor rebellion but the more mature, Amal (Aamina Sheikh) and Ali (Mohib Mirza) refuse to give in. The opposition continues and their parents secretly do a court marriage without waiting any longer for approval from their families. Eventually Shagufta moves into Asif's house and in the beginning the opposite parent's kids hate each other. But after some time they begin to become friends and Amal and Ali fall in love. Sanam, Shagufta's other daughter, falls in love with a boy in her college, Mikaal. They eventually get engaged as do Amal and Ali in the end.

== Promotion ==
Mohib Mirza appeared in one episode of the sitcom Nadaaniyaan, also produced by Fareed Nawaz Productions, to promote Hum Tum. He portrayed Ishrat Baji, a character from the show of the same name.
