= Wrong No. =

- Theatrical release poster
- Directed by: Yasir Nawaz
- Screenplay by: Yasir Nawaz; Mohsin Ali
- Story by: Yasir Nawaz
- Produced by: Hassan Zia; Yasir Nawaz; Nida Yasir
- Starring: Danish Taimoor; Sohai Ali Abro; Janita Asma; Javed Sheikh; Qavi Khan; Shafqat Cheema; Danish Nawaz; Tooba Siddiqui; Nadeem Jafri
- Cinematography: Zahid Hussain
- Edited by: Rizwan AQ
- Music by: Waqar Ali
- Production company: YNH Films
- Distributed by: ARY Films; 20th Century Studios
- Release date: 18 July 2015
- Running time: 127 Minutes
- Country: Pakistan
- Language: Urdu
- Box office: PKR 42.30 Crore

Wrong No. (also written as Wrong Number) is a 2015 Pakistani romantic comedy film directed by Yasir Nawaz (in his feature directorial debut) and co-produced by Yasir Nawaz, Nida Yasir and Hassan Zia under the production banner YNH Films. It is the first installment in the Wrong No. film series. The film features Javed Sheikh, Danish Taimoor, Nadeem Jaffri, Danish Nawaz, Shafqat Cheema, Sohai Ali Abro and Janita Asma in lead roles.

The film was released by ARY Films in cinemas nationwide on 18 July 2015 (Eid ul-Fitr).

== Plot ==
The story revolves around Sallu who hopes to make it big in showbiz someday. However, his plans have to face the wrath of his father Haji Aba, a family inherited butcher who wants his son to either join the other men of the family and be a butcher or get some government job. Laila is the girl next door, who has a thing for Sallu but Sallu is not interested in her and wants to focus on his career.

While Sallu's story is set in Karachi, there is another track in Lahore featuring Haya who flies to Karachi to receive Shehryar who arrives from Sydney and is all set to succeed his grandfather and run the company Haya works at. Meanwhile, a dreaded don Shera hatches a plan to kidnap Sheheryar for his wealth and sends his top but lazy and fool henchmen. However, this is in vain as his henchmen are betraying him to take his place in order. Then the story gets a bit twisted and the Wrong Number-ness kicks in.

== Cast ==
- Javed Sheikh as Haji Abba, Sallu's father and an inherited butcher
- Danish Taimoor in a double role as Salman (Sallu) / Shehryar. Salman is a local boy from Karachi who desires to be a filmstar while Shehryar is the grandson of Nawab and came to Pakistan to take over Nawab's company
- Ramiz Siddiqui as papu, Haji Abba's Son and Sallu's Brother
- Janita Asma as Haya, Sallu's Love Interest
- Nayyar Ejaz as Gullu Butt, M.D. of Nawab's company
- Qavi Khan as Nawab, Owner of the company and Shehryar's grandfather
- Shafqat Cheema as Shera, Criminal
- Sohai Ali Abro as Laila, Hajra's daughter and Shehryar's love interest
- Nadeem Jafri as Pappi, Gangster and Bali's fellow
- Danish Nawaz as Bali, Gangster and Pappi's fellow
- Ismail Tara as Saleem, Barber
- Tooba Siddiqui as Guest in Nachay Mann Song
- Yasir Nawaz Cameos as Nawaz Badmash (Rusk Lover)
- Nida Mumtaz as Hajra, Laila's Mother

== Production ==
=== Marketing ===
The film's marketing and distribution rights are held by ARY Films. Speaking with ARY News, the director/producer stated that he was happy and delighted at the support that ARY Digital Network had provided him with and that he was looking forward to the film's release on Eid-ul-Fitr. On 13 April 2015 first look posters were released online by ARY Films. On 15 March, the teaser trailer was revealed on TV channels under ARY Digital Network. Three more posters were revealed on 21 April. A controversial poster featuring Danish Nawaz and characters was revealed on 19 May. On 18 May, another character poster was revealed featuring Shafqat Cheema with his gang, playing the villain's role in the film. The theatrical trailer was revealed on 3 June by TV channels under ARY Digital Network. Two video songs, "Selfiyan" and "Kundi", were released on 15 June, which received a negative response on social media.

In reply to critics, the director said, "When we started writing the film even then we knew we would get good reviews, and we will come across bad people. But the best thing about a making a film is that it’s either a hit or a flop. Either way you find out if the audience liked it or not." Renowned Indian film producer Mahesh Bhatt and Vishal Bhardwaj recorded video messages specifically urging people to watch this film. On the film's release, Javed Sheikh also recorded a video inviting Prime Minister Nawaz Sharif to watch this film in the cinema.

== Soundtrack ==
The music of the film was composed by Waqar Ali.

No.	Title	Singer(s)	Length
1.	"Selfiyan"	Elia Waqar	3:25
2.	"Nachay Mann"	Sara Raza & Nabeel Shaukat Ali	4:17
3.	"Kundi"	Humaira Channa	3:29
4.	"Koi Bata De"	Faisal Khan	3:00
5.	"Dheeray Dheeray"	Sara Raza & Nabeel Shaukat Ali	4:27
6.	"Bhaag Ja"	Asrar	5:19
Total length:			23:57

== Release ==
The film was premiered in Lahore on 13 July and in Karachi on 15 July 2015. The film released across Pakistan on 79 screens competing Bajrangi Bhaijaan and Bin Roye.

== Reception ==
=== Critical response ===
Professional ratings
Review scores
Source	Rating
The Express Tribune	2.5/5 stars
Galaxy Lollywood	3.8/5 stars

Rafay Mahmood of The Express Tribune rated the film 2.5 out of 5 stars and wrote, "It is the small moments and performances by the side actors that make an otherwise ordinary film a joyride. Beyond that, it is a test of your bladder and brain, whatever lets go first."

Asad Haroon of Dispatch News Desk said, "Wrong Number is a slapstick comedy filled with humor. One can't stop laughing throughout the movie and the dialogues are pretty well written and up to the mark. The script of the movie wasn’t predictable that much but the dialogues were totally unpredictable and funny to such an extent that one could say that I didn't see that coming. The production quality of Wrong number is not that great as of Bin Roye but the screen is pretty bright of wrong number."

== Accolades ==
Ceremony	Category	Recipient	Result
15th Lux Style Awards	Best Film	Wrong No.	Nominated
15th Lux Style Awards	Best Actor	Danish Taimoor	Nominated
15th Lux Style Awards	Best Actress	Sohai Ali Abro	Nominated
15th Lux Style Awards	Best Supporting Actor	Javed Sheikh	Won
2nd ARY Film Awards	Best Film	Wrong No.	Nominated
2nd ARY Film Awards	Best Director	Yasir Nawaz	Nominated
2nd ARY Film Awards	Best Actor	Danish Taimoor	Nominated
2nd ARY Film Awards	Best Actress	Sohai Ali Abro	Nominated
2nd ARY Film Awards	Best Supporting Actor	Javed Sheikh	Nominated
2nd ARY Film Awards	Best Supporting Actress	Janita Asma	Nominated
2nd ARY Film Awards	Best Star Debut Female	Sohai Ali Abro	Nominated
2nd ARY Film Awards	Best Star Debut Female	Janita Asma	Nominated
2nd ARY Film Awards	Best Actor in a Comic Role	Danish Nawaz	Nominated
2nd ARY Film Awards	Best Actor in a Negative Role	Shafqat Cheema	Nominated
2nd ARY Film Awards	Best Playback Singer – Female	Sara Raza Khan ("Dheeray Dheeray")	Won
2nd ARY Film Awards	Best Playback Singer – Male	Nabeel Shaukat Ali	Nominated
2nd ARY Film Awards	Best Playback Singer – Male	Asrar	Nominated

== Sequel ==
Directed by Yasir Nawaz, the 2019 sequel Wrong No. 2 serves as the second installment in the franchise. Featuring a new lead cast of Sami Khan and Neelam Muneer alongside returning actors Jawed Sheikh, Mehmood Aslam, and Danish Nawaz, the film was released on Eid ul-Fitr, 5 June 2019. A commercial success, it became the third highest-grossing Pakistani film of 2019. The film emerged as a box-office success and became the third highest-grossing Pakistani film of 2019.

== See also ==
- List of highest-grossing Pakistani films
- List of Pakistani films of 2015
