= Mirza Shahi =

Pakistani actor and comedian (1931 – 2020)

Mirza Shahi (11 October 1931 – 29 September 2020) was a Pakistani actor and comedian. He is best known for playing the role of Chacha Kamal in the sitcom Nadaniyan and Aleemudin Sahab in the cult classic Quddusi Sahab Ki Bewah.

== Biography ==
Shahi started his film career in the East Pakistani film industry in 1965 with the film Shaadi. In 1967, he starred in actor Nadeem's debut film Chakori. He settled in Karachi with his family after the creation of Bangladesh. He took multiple jobs due to financial challenges after emigrating from East Pakistan in 1971.

Some of his notable works include the films Chakori, Quddusi Sahab Ki Bewah, Chhotey Sahab, and Geo TV comedy drama serial Nadaniyaan where he played the role of Chacha Kamal

In September 2020, he was diagnosed with COVID-19 during the COVID-19 pandemic in Pakistan. He died on 29 September 2020, at Civil Hospital Karachi.
