= Kazim Pasha (director) =

Pakistani television director and producer

- Occupations: Television director, producer
- Children: Nida Yasir (daughter)
- Awards: Pride of Performance Award by the President of Pakistan (2012)

Kazim Pasha (PP) (Urdu: کاظم پاشا) is a Pakistani television director and producer known for his famous directions for PTV.

His directions also include a film Ghazi Shaheed (1998).

He is the father of TV show host Nida Yasir.

== TV Dramas ==
- Uljhan
- Jangloos (1989)
- Chhaon
- Iʻtirāf
- Kashkol (1993)
- Gurez
- Manḍī
- Seerhian
- Kashish
- Aanchal (2003)
- Baarh (2009)

== Movies ==
- Ghazi Shaheed - 1998

== Awards ==
- Pride of Performance Award in 2012 by the President of Pakistan.
