= Dil Mom Ka Diya =

2018 Pakistani drama serial

- Left to right: Hira Mani, Yasir Nawaz, Neelam Muneer, Imran Ashraf
- Genre: Romance; Drama
- Written by: Saira Raza
- Directed by: Shahid Shafaat
- Starring: Yasir Nawaz; Neelam Muneer; Imran Ashraf; Hira Mani; Erum Akhtar; Hassam Khan
- Country of origin: Pakistan
- Original language: Urdu
- No. of seasons: 1
- No. of episodes: 30

Production
- Production locations: Karachi, Pakistan
- Running time: 40 mintutes

Original release
- Network: ARY Digital
- Release: 28 August – 4 December 2018

Dil Mom Ka Diya (Urdu: دل موم کا دیا, lit. 'The Heart is a Wax Lamp') is a 2018 Pakistani romantic drama serial that premiered on 28 August 2018 on ARY Digital. It is written by Saira Raza and directed by Shahid Shafaat. It stars Neelam Muneer, Yasir Nawaz, Hira Mani and Imran Ashraf. It is produced by Humayun Saeed and Shehzad Nasib.

== Cast ==
- Yasir Nawaz as Afzal
- Neelam Muneer as Ulfat
- Hira Mani as Tamkinat
- Imran Ashraf as Azhar
- Alizeh Shah as Farhat
- Erum Akhtar as Salma; Afzal's sister
- Qavi Khan as Maulvi Sahab: Ulfat and Farhat's father
- Nida Mumtaz as Ulfat and Farhat's mother
- Hassam Khan as Akmal; Afzal's younger brother
- Zubi Majeed as Kausar; Afzal's younger sister
- Salman Faisal as Tipu

== Reception ==
The show received huge popularity and viewership during its broadcast. The self-centred and greedy character of Ulfat received praise from critics and viewers. The most popular serial of that time, it received the highest TRPs of 18, which became the highest ever rating of any TV program in Pakistan. Later, this record was broken by the 2019 blockbuster Mere Paas Tum Ho.

== Accolades ==
Year	Award	Category	Recipient(s)	Result	Ref.
2019	ARY Digital- Social Media Drama Awards 2018	Best Drama Serial -2018	Dil Mom Ka Diya	Won	
2019	ARY Digital- Social Media Drama Awards 2018	Best Actor Male (Serial)	Yasir Nawaz	Nominated	
2019	ARY Digital- Social Media Drama Awards 2018	Best Actor Female (Serial)	Neelam Muneer	Won	
2019	ARY Digital- Social Media Drama Awards 2018	Best Supporting Actor (Male)	Imran Ashraf	Nominated	
2019	ARY Digital- Social Media Drama Awards 2018	Best Supporting Actor (Female)	Hira Mani	Nominated	
2019	ARY Digital- Social Media Drama Awards 2018	Best Newcomer (Male)	Hassam Khan	Nominated	
2019	ARY Digital- Social Media Drama Awards 2018	Best Newcomer (Male)	Salman Faisal	Nominated	
2019	ARY Digital- Social Media Drama Awards 2018	Best Newcomer (Female)	Zubi Majeed	Nominated	
2019	ARY Digital- Social Media Drama Awards 2018	Best Newcomer (Female)	Alizeh Shah	Nominated	
2019	ARY Digital- Social Media Drama Awards 2018	Best OST	Adnan Dhool and Sanam Marvi	Won	
2019	ARY Digital- Social Media Drama Awards 2018	Best Couple	Hira Mani and Imran Ashraf	Nominated	
2019	ARY Digital- Social Media Drama Awards 2018	Best Couple	Neelam Muneer and Yasir Nawaz	Nominated	
2019	ARY Digital- Social Media Drama Awards 2018	Best Director	Shahid Shafaat	Won	
2019	ARY Digital- Social Media Drama Awards 2018	Best Script Writer	Saira Raza	Won	
2019	Lux Style Awards	Best TV Play	Dil Mom Ka Diya	Nominated	
2019	Lux Style Awards	Best TV Actress (Viewer's choice)	Neelam Muneer	Nominated	
2019	Lux Style Awards	Best TV Actress (Critic's choice)	Neelam Muneer	Nominated	
2019	Lux Style Awards	Best TV Director	Shahid Shafat	Nominated	
2019	3rd IPPA Awards 2019	Best Supporting Actor TV serial	Hira Mani	Won	
2019	3rd IPPA Awards 2019	Best Director TV Serial	Shahid Shafaat	Nominated	
2019	3rd IPPA Awards 2019	Best TV Serial -Jury	Dil Mom Ka Diya	Won	
2019	3rd IPPA Awards 2019	Best TV Serial -Viewer's choice	Dil Mom Ka Diya	Nominated	
2019	3rd IPPA Awards 2019	Best Actress-Viewer's choice	Neelam Muneer	Won	
2019	3rd IPPA Awards 2019	Best Actor-Viewer's choice	Yasir Nawaz	Nominated	
