= Tanhai (TV series) =

Pakistani TV series

- Title screen featuring Jia, Faiz, Arzoo, Mohsin
- Also known as: Tanhai
- Genre: Drama
- Written by: Sarwat Nazeer
- Directed by: Fahim Burney
- Starring: Sohai Ali Abro; Goher Mumtaz; Azfar Rehman; Ayesha Omar; Saba Hameed
- Theme music composer: Goher Mumtaz
- Country of origin: Pakistan
- Original language: Urdu
- No. of seasons: 1
- No. of episodes: 20

Production
- Producers: Syed Afzal Ali; Momina Duraid
- Production locations: Karachi; Bangkok
- Running time: 40-45 minutes
- Production company: Mushroom Productions

Original release
- Network: Hum TV
- Release: 27 February – 10 July 2013

Related
- Zindagi Gulzar Hai

Tanhai (Urdu: تنہائی, English: Loneliness) is a 2013 Pakistani television drama serial by Hum TV. The first episode of the 20-episode serial aired on 27 February 2013 and the last episode on 10 July 2013. The serial was directed by Fahim Burney and written by Sarwat Nazeer. It was produced by Syed Afzal Ali and Momina Duraid, starring Sohai Ali Abro, Goher Mumtaz, Azfar Rehman, Ayesha Omar and Saba Hameed. It also aired in India on Zindagi under the same name.

== Plot ==
The story starts with a flashback. Faiz (Goher Mumtaz) was married to Arzoo (Ayesha Omer) and loved her a lot. They had two children, but Arzoo wanted to be a working woman, not a mother. She meets Mohsin (Azfar Rehman) and he promises to give her everything she wants, so she leaves Faiz and marries Mohsin.

Faiz is living a broken-hearted and bitter life, when his mother (Saba Hameed) makes him marry for the second time, against his will. His mother chooses a young woman from a lower-middle-class family named Jia (Sohai Ali Abro). Jia does not agree to this as she wants to marry her cousin. She goes to Faiz's office and rejects him, where Faiz realizes that he cannot be defeated by any woman again. Using his contacts he get Jia's cousin transferred to Dubai. Jia's cousin tells her to wait for their marriage, and Jia realizes that he is a selfish man, so she decides to marry Faiz.

On the first night of their marriage, Jia finds out that Faiz has two children and is in shock. Faiz tells her that he only married her for the sake of his mother and his children. She asks her brother why he hid this truth from her, to which he replies that he only did it for her secure future. Jia's mother (Farah Nadeem) eventually finds out the truth and is devastated. In the first few days, the children hate her but eventually the children and Faiz get closer to her. Slowly, Jia's family start to accept her step-children as well.

Arzoo learns about this and tries to meet with her kids more often, as she doesn't want them to forget her. She becomes jealous of Faiz and Jia's relationship, as she feels that Faiz had truly loved none other than her. She brings her children to her and Mohsin's house, to which Mohsin disagrees. He screams and misbehaves with the children causing them to leave. She tries to apologize to her children, but they still don't talk to her. Arzoo starts regretting leaving Faiz for some time and calls him with the excuse of talking to the children, to which he says that he is going on honeymoon to Bangkok and the children are gone. Arzoo gets jealous and asks Mohsin to take her to Bangkok as well. Throughout this time, Mohsin is shown to be having an affair with Arzoo's friend and that both of them are using Arzoo for her money.

Faiz and Jia are followed by Arzoo to Bangkok. Mohsin helps Jia as she was chased by a few robbers. Meanwhile, Faiz and Arzoo meet as Arzoo calls Faiz as she exchanges the phones purposely. When Jia finds out that Mohsin and Arzoo are in Bangkok she freaks out fearing that she will lose Faiz to Arzoo. Faiz tells Jia that he loves her. Meanwhile, Arzoo continues to stalk Faiz and Jia. Faiz and Jia go back to Pakistan after Jia's brother has an accident. Around that time Zubair returns to Pakistan. Arzoo hires him for her own gain to make Faiz, believe that Jia is cheating on him with Zubair. He believes it when he sees Zubair and Jia at the beach talking to each other not knowing that Jia is asking him to leave her alone. Faiz kicks Jia out, and she is sent back home. Jia is devastated so her brother goes to talk to Faiz and sees that he has invited Arzoo back into his home.

Arzoo and Mohsin are also in cahoots as he wants everything from her including properties and money. Arzoo refuses and tries to sue him. Zubair is told that Arzoo is Faiz's ex-wife so he quits his job. The children return to find out that Arzoo is living there; they are not happy because they want Jia back. They go the next day and ask Jia to come back home. Since Jia loves them she agrees. Faiz asks what Jia is doing there and tells her to leave, he gives her the divorce papers to sign.

Mohsin divorces Arzoo, and she tells him to be happy. Faiz meets with Mohsin and finds out that Arzoo lied to him when she said she didn't want anything. Faiz apologizes to Jia as does Zubair about their behavior towards her. Arzoo is shocked by the turn of events when she sees Jia, Faiz and the kids going out for dinner and the kids tell her that she isn't their mother. Then Arzoo goes to Mohsin there she finds him with her friend: Mohsin tells her he's leaving her for her friend, Anum. The end shows an angry Arzoo going back to her home alone crying. She goes into her room and starts saying that she has everything then why is she crying. Then she is drawing on the floor with her finger and starts laughing.

== Cast ==
- Sohai Ali Abro as Jahan Ara "Jiya"
- Goher Mumtaz as Faiz
- Azfar Rehman as Mohsin
- Ayesha Omar as Arzoo
- Saba Hameed as Faiz's mother
- Arisha Razi as Sabeen
- Farah Nadeem as Jia's mother
- Uzma Akhter as Jiah's bhabhi
- Yasir Shoro as Zubair

== Soundtrack ==
Tanhai's original title song is sung by Goher Mumtaz of Jal.
