= Yasir Nawaz =

Pakistani director, producer, screenwriter, actor and former model

- Born: Yasir Nawaz Baloch; 22 June 1970 (age 56); Hyderabad, Sindh, Pakistan
- Occupations: Director; Actor; Producer; Screenwriter
- Years active: 1993 – present
- Known for: Wrong No. (2015); Mehrunisa V Lub U (2017); Wrong No. 2 (2019)
- Spouse: Nida Yasir (m. 2002)
- Children: 3
- Parent: Fareed Nawaz Baloch (father)
- Relatives: Danish Nawaz (brother)

Yasir Nawaz Baloch (Urdu: یاسر نواز بلوچ) is a Pakistani director, producer, screenwriter, actor and former model.

Mainly known as a television actor, he has also directed movies such as Wrong No. (2015), Mehrunisa V Lub U (2017) and Wrong No. 2 (2019).

== Early and personal life ==
Yasir was born in a family of four children to film and TV actor Fareed Nawaz Baloch.

A Sindhi-Baloch by ethnicity, Yasir identifies as a Sindhi in terms of culture. He is the elder brother of fellow actor-director and comedian Danish Nawaz.

He married Nida Yasir (born Pasha), a producer, actress and host, in 2002; they have three children together.

== Career ==
Baloch started his career as an actor and model. Later he started direction and production of television dramas.

== Filmography ==
=== Television serials ===
| Year | Title | Network | Actor | Director | Producer | Ref. |
|---|---|---|---|---|---|---|
| 1993 | Badaltay Mausam | PTV | Yes | No | No | |
| 1998 | Dhoop Mein Sawan | PTV | Yes | No | No | |
| 1998 | Mohlat | PTV | Yes | No | No | |
| 1999 | Aik Mohabat Sau Afsanay | PTV | Yes | No | No | |
| 2002 | Jannat | PTV | Yes | No | No | |
| 2002 | Kahaniyan | PTV | Yes | No | No | |
| 2003 | Harjaee | Indus Vision | Yes | No | No | |
| 2006 | Dil, Diya, Dehleez | Hum TV | No | Yes | No | |
| 2008 | Meri Adhoori Mohabbat | Geo Entertainment | No | Yes | No | |
| 2009 | Nadaaniyaan | Geo Entertainment | Yes | Yes | No | |
| 2009 | Tanveer Fatima (B.A) | Geo Entertainment | Yes | No | No | |
| 2009 | Dil Ki Dehleez Par | PTV | No | Yes | No | |
| 2009 | Rishtay Mouhabaton Kay | PTV | Yes | No | No | |
| 2010 | Hum Tum | Geo Entertainment | Yes | No | Yes | |
| 2010 | Thori Si Wafa Chahiye | Geo Entertainment | No | Yes | No | |
| 2010 | Zeenat Bint-e-Sakina Hazir Ho | Geo Entertainment | Yes | No | No | |
| 2010 | Uraan | Geo Entertainment | No | Yes | No | |
| 2012 | Saat Pardon Mein | Geo Entertainment | No | Yes | No | |
| 2012 | Jannat Se Nikali Hui Aurat | Geo Entertainment | No | Yes | No | |
| 2013 | Shukk | ARY Digital | No | Yes | No | |
| 2014 | Chup Raho | ARY Digital | Yes | Yes | No | |
| 2015 | Malaika | Urdu 1 | No | Yes | No | |
| 2016 | Tum Kon Piya | Urdu 1 | No | Yes | No | |
| 2017 | Masoom | Express Entertainment | Yes | No | No | |
| 2017 | Khudgarz | ARY Digital | No | Yes | No | |
| 2018 | Dil Mom Ka Diya | ARY Digital | Yes | No | No | |
| 2020 | Mera Dil Mera Dushman | ARY Digital | Yes | No | No | |
| 2020 | Bikhray Moti | ARY Digital | Yes | No | No | |
| 2022 | Chaudhry and Sons | Geo Entertainment | Yes | No | No | |
| 2024 | Behkaway | Geo Entertainment | Yes | No | No | |
| 2025 | Sanwal Yaar Piya | Geo Entertainment | Yes | No | No | |
| 2026 | Tum Larkay Bhi Na | Hum TV | Yes | Yes | No | |

=== Telefilms ===
| Year | Title | Actor | Director | Network |
|---|---|---|---|---|
| 1996 | Peela Jora | Yes | No | PTV |
| 1997 | Putli Ghar | Yes | No | PTV |
| 1998 | Chalo Phir Se Muskurayein | Yes | No | PTV |
| 1998 | Saiban Sheeshe Ka | Yes | No | PTV |
| 1999 | No. 9 | Yes | No | PTV |
| 2013 | Anjuman | No | Yes | Geo Entertainment |

=== Films ===
| Year | Film | Director | Producer | Screenwriter | Actor | Notes |
|---|---|---|---|---|---|---|
| 2015 | Wrong No. | Yes | Yes | Yes | Yes | Cameo role |
| 2017 | Mehrunisa V Lub U | Yes | Yes | Yes | No | |
| 2019 | Wrong No. 2 | Yes | Yes | Yes | Yes | |
| 2022 | Chakkar | Yes | Yes | Yes | Yes | |

== Awards and nominations ==
| Year | Ceremony | Category | Project | Result |
|---|---|---|---|---|
| 2011 | 10th Lux Style Awards | Best TV Director | Thori Si Wafa Chahiye | Nominated |
| 2012 | 11th Lux Style Awards | Best TV Director | Uraan | Nominated |
| 2015 | 14th Lux Style Awards | Best TV Director | Shukk | Nominated |
| 2016 | 15th Lux Style Awards | Best Film | Wrong No. | Nominated |
| 2016 | 2nd ARY Film Awards | Best Director | Wrong No. | Nominated |
| 2018 | ARY Digital Social Media Awards | Best Actor Male (Serial) | Dil Mom Ka Diya | Nominated |
| 2019 | 3rd IPPA Awards | Best Actor (Serial) | Dil Mom Ka Diya | Nominated |
| 2019 | 4th IPPA Awards | Best Film | Wrong No. 2 | Nominated |
| 2019 | 4th IPPA Awards | Best Director (Film) | Wrong No. 2 | Nominated |
| 2021 | 2nd Pakistan International Screen Awards | Best TV Actor – Jury | Bikhray Moti | Nominated |
