= List of Pakistani films of 2014 =

List of Pakistani films by year 2014

The Pakistani film industry produced over fifteen feature films in 2014. This article includes an overview of the major 2014 events in Pakistani film, including film festivals and awards ceremonies, as well as lists of those films that have been particularly well received, both critically and financially.

== Top Grossing Films ==
The highest grossing films released in 2014 by worldwide gross are as follows:

Highest-grossing films of 2014
Rank	Title	Studio	Gross	Ref.
1.	Na Maloom Afraad	Filmwala Pictures	Rs. 14.00 crore (US$500,000)	
2.	O21	One Motion Pictures	Rs. 6.10 crore (US$220,000)	
3.	The System	Leos productions	Rs. 4.06 crore (US$150,000)	
4.	Sultanat	A B pictures	Rs. 3.15 crore (US$110,000)	
5.	Dukhtar	Zambeel Films, The Crew Films	Rs. 1.65 crore (US$59,000)	
6.	Tamanna	Concordia Productions	Rs. 0.55 crore (US$20,000)	

== Events ==
=== Award ceremonies ===
Date	Event	Host	Location	Ref.
January 11	4th Pakistan Media Awards	Pakistan Media Awards	Karachi, Sindh, Pakistan	
March 29	2nd Hum Awards	Hum Network Limited	Karachi, Sindh, Pakistan	
April 27	1st ARY Film Awards	ARY Digital Network	Karachi, Sindh, Pakistan	
4 December	13th Lux Style Awards	Lux Style Awards	Karachi, Sindh, Pakistan	

== Releases ==
Opening		Title	Cast and Crew	Studio	Genre(s)	Ref.
M A Y	30	The System	Director: Shahzad Ghufoor; Cast: Sheraz, Kashaf Ali	Prime Film International	Action; Drama	
J U N	13	Tamanna	Director: Steven Moore; Cast: Mehreen Raheel, Omair Rana, Salman Shahid, Feryal Gauhar	Summit Entertainment	Drama; Crime	
J U L	29	Sultanat	Director: Syed Faisal Bukhari; Cast: Ahsan Khan, Javeria Abbasi, Javed Sheikh	786 Media Works	Action; Romance	
S E P	5	Dukhtar	Director: Afia Nathaniel; Cast: Samiya Mumtaz, Mohib Mirza, Saleha Aref, Asif Khan, Ajab Gul, Samina Ahmad	Geo Films	Drama; Thriller	
O C T	6	Na Maloom Afraad	Director: Nabeel Qureshi; Cast: Fahad Mustafa, Javed Sheikh, Mohsin Abbas Haider, Urwa Hocane	Hum Films	Comedy; Thriller	
O C T	6	O21	Directors: Jami, Summer Nicks; Cast: Shaan Shahid, Shamoon Abbasi, Aamina Sheikh, Ayub Khoso	IMGC Global Entertainment	Thriller	

== Other Releases ==
Title	Director	Release Date	Genre
Road Princess	Jassim Alvi	20 January 2014 (Pakistan)	Drama
Haramkhor	Qaisar Sanobar	24 January 2014 (Pakistan)	Action
Naseebo	Parvez Rana	28 February 2014 (Pakistan)	Drama
Puttar Makhan Gujjar da	Mohammad Shehzad Haidar	28 February 2014	Action
Yeh Friendship	Khursheed Khan	10 March 2014 (Pakistan)	Action
Dunya	Shahid Rana	14 March 2014 (Pakistan)	Drama
Pendu Prince	Ajmal Malik	11 April 2014	Comedy
Lafanga	Naseem Haidar Shah	11 April 2014	Comedy
Zargia Khwar She	Arshad Khan	18 April 2014	Action
Jan tun Pyara	Murad Ali Yousuf	2 May 2014	Romance
Dastan	Hassan Askari	16 May 2014	Action
Eitbar	Sohail Ali Tony	16 May 2014	Romance
Ranjhay Hath Gandasa	Shehzad Haidar	16 May 2014	Comedy
Inhiraaf	Ahmad Javaid	19 May 2014 (Pakistan)	Documentary
Azari	Arshad Khan	29 July 2014	Action
Ishq Di Galli	M. Asif Sheikh	29 July 2014 (Pakistan)	Romance
Jawargar	Arshad Khan	29 July 2014	Action
Change	Danish Naveed	30 September 2014 (UK)	Comedy
I Miss You	Abid Naseem	5 October 2014 (Pakistan)	Drama
Zwee Da Badamala	Haji Nadar Khan	5 October 2014 (Pakistan)	Action
Organize Chaos	S.R. Farman	27 December 2014 (USA)	Action

== See also ==
- 2014 in film
- 2014 in Pakistan
- Cinema of Pakistan
- List of Pakistani submissions for the Academy Award for Best Foreign Language Film
