= Shaz Khan =

American Pakistani actor

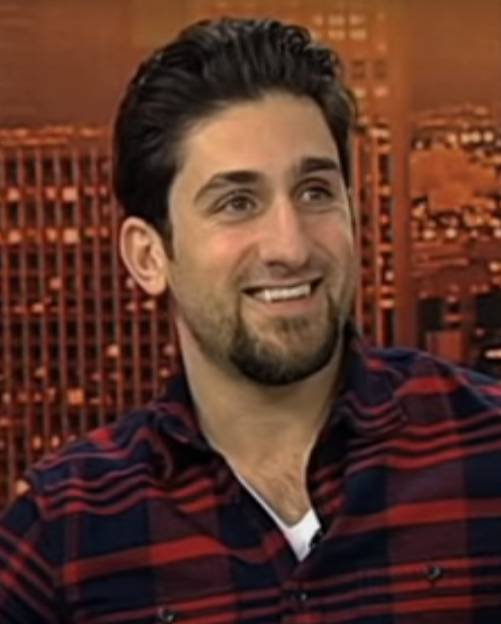
- Khan in 2015
- Born: Shazli Hafeez Khan; Oxnard, California, U.S
- Occupations: Actor, director, producer
- Years active: 2011–present
- Spouse: Saba Khan (m. 2012)
- Website: Official website

Shazli Hafeez Khan, better known as Shaz Khan is an American actor, producer, screenwriter and who appears in English and Urdu films and television series. After pursuing a bachelor's degree in finance from the Pennsylvania State University and a master's degree in fine arts from the Pace University, Khan made his acting debut with the acclaimed foreign Oscar contending drama Moor (2015) and received audience praise for playing the role of an inspirational lawyer in the blockbuster television series Yaqeen Ka Safar (2017), an airforce pilot in the combat film Parwaaz Hai Junoon (2018), and a conflicted MMA fighter in the English sports action drama The Martial Artist.

== Early life and education ==
Khan was born in Oxnard, California to Nasir and Huma, from Islamabad, Pakistan. He belongs to a family with military background: his maternal grandfather was an air commodore in the Pakistan Air Force, while his maternal uncle is also an air commodore as well "one of the top F16 pilots of his generation."

He spent his childhood between Pakistan and the United States, eventually settling in the suburbs of Philadelphia. After high school, Khan ended up attending Pennsylvania State University, where he also boxed for the college team, completing a Bachelor of Science in finance. He worked for a Fortune 500 company in the banking industry, though it would only last a few years. Khan ultimately left his stable job to pursue acting in New York City.

== Career ==
The next few years were spent attending the Actors Studio Drama School at Pace University, completing a Master of Fine Arts in acting. During this time, he worked in numerous plays and independent films, building his experience. Khan established a reputation for doing whatever it took to immerse himself in a character. For his thesis play Hello Out There, he drove to a ghost town in Texas to do research, sleeping overnight in the haunted jail by himself. For the short film Flutter, Khan spent a month getting into the physiological state to play a young cancer patient, including losing 25 pounds and shaving his head and eyebrows. He also ventured into some experimental work by making his own series of short films, writing characters for himself while he was auditioning for roles. Among them was a young sadistic Oscar Wilde in The Importance of Being Earnest as well as a deluded boxer Ibby in Say It Ain't So.

Even though he made his Pakistan TV debut in Mehreen Jabbar's 2012 drama Mata-e-Jaan Hai Tu with the little role of lawyer Vicky, followed by another minor role as David in Momina Duraid's Zid, his break occurred on a trip to Pakistan where he secured the lead role in the international feature film Moor, directed by Jami. He spent a month in a village in Balochistan, observing the behaviors of local Pashtuns to find the physicality of his character, and learning to speak Urdu in their dialect. The film was hailed as one of the most critically acclaimed features in Pakistan, with Newsline Magazine claiming it as one of the best films Pakistan has ever made. The film was selected as the Pakistani entry for the Best Foreign Language Film at the 88th Academy Awards. It was in contention as one of the dark horse contenders but didn't receive a nomination. He shared the screen with established actors Hameed Sheikh and Samiyah Mumtaz. It was his debut in the Pakistani film industry.

In 2016 he appeared in the romantic drama Dobara Phir Se directed by Mehreen Jabbar and produced by ARY Films followed by Haseeb Hassan's Parwaaz Hai Junoon in 2018, both being critical as well as commercial successes, in-between having what is now considered a legendary role of Barrister Daniyal in the 2017 Hum TV hit drama Yaqeen Ka Safar. He returned to the channel in 2018, with the leading role in the drama Lamhay.

After taking long hiatus to create his own production company, in 2025 he directed and starred in the sports action drama The Martial Artist which tells the story of a martial artist who has a spiritual awakening in his motherland. The movie is an enlargement of his 2016 short film Say It Ain't So, that he also wrote, as well as directed and acted in. In order to prepare for the role, he trained in MMA with the Brazilian coach Rafael Cordeiro, who has trained world champions and trains fighters from Ultimate Fighting Championship, while also training in boxing, Jujutsu and Muay Thai from top notch coaches in Orange County for numerous years. Movie was described as striking action meeting introspective drama.. The cinematography, fight choreography and the cast were praised in the film with some pointing to the story being compelling but also needing a tune up. His commitment to the role was applauded with one critic saying "his performance captures the essence of a troubled spirit with subtle shifts in expression and body language that illustrate inner conflict. His ability to oscillate between vigor and vulnerability adds a palpable weight to key confrontations, both in and outside the ring."

== Personal life ==
Khan resides with his wife, Saba Khan, since their marriage in 2012, in California, and she gave birth to their child, a son, named Ayaan, in January 2020.

== Filmography ==
=== Films ===
Year	Film	Role	Director	Producer	Screenwriter	Note
2008	Better Luck Yesterday	Tony				
2008	The Mysteries of Pittsburgh	Lebanese Guy				Uncredited
2008	Guardian	Doug				Short film
2010	Adams Morgan: The Movie	Lance Roberts				
2011	We're Not Waving, We're Drowning	Cameron				Short film
2011	Out of Line	Malcolm				Short film
2011	Acquaintance	Adam Wally				Short film
2012	The Weekend	Conrad				Short film
2013	Flutter	Jake				Short film
2013	The Man Behind the Curtain	Abusive Boyfriend				
2013	Importance of Ernest	Bloke		Yes	Yes	Short film
2015	Moor	Ehsaanullah Khan				Leading role
2016	Haze	Degan				Supporting role
2016	Say It Ain't So	Ibby	Yes	Yes	Yes	Short film
2016	Dobara Phir Se	Asim				Supporting role
2018	Parwaaz Hay Junoon	Sq/Ldr Nadir Kirmani				Leading role
2019	Heer Maan Ja	Office Junior Employee				Supporting role
2025	The Martial Artist	Ibby "The Prince" Bakran	Yes	Yes	Yes	Leading role

=== Television series ===
Year	Title	Role	Network	Note
2012	Mata-e-Jaan Hai Tu	Vicky	Hum TV	Supporting role
2014	Zid	David	Hum TV	Supporting role
2017	Yaqeen Ka Safar	Barrister Daniyal Ali Khan	Hum TV	Leading role
2018	Lamhay	Hashir	Hum TV	Leading role

== Awards and nominations ==
Year	Award	Category	Result	Title	Ref.
2016	15th Lux Style Awards	Best Supporting Actor	Nominated	Moor	
2016	2nd Galaxy Lollywood Awards	Best Actor in a Leading Role Male	Nominated	Moor	
2016	2nd Galaxy Lollywood Awards	Best Male Debut	Nominated	Moor	
2018	6th Hum Awards	Most Impactful Character	Nominated	Yaqeen Ka Safar	
