= O21 (film) =

- Theatrical release poster
- Directed by: Jami; Summer Nicks
- Written by: Jami; Summer Nicks; Azaan Sami Khan; Joe Towne
- Produced by: Zeba Bakhtiar
- Starring: Shaan Shahid; Ayub Khosa; Aamina Sheikh; Summer Nicks; Shamoon Abbasi; Mustafa Changazi; Hameed Sheikh; Shakeel Hussain Khan; Ayaz Samoo; Gohar Rasheed; Hina Rizvi; Bilal Ashraf; Iman Ali; Tatmain Ul Qulb; Abdullah Ghaznavi; Joe Towne as; James Hallett; Wendy Haines
- Cinematography: Mo Azmi
- Edited by: Rizwan AQ
- Music by: Alfonso González Aguilar
- Production companies: One Motion Pictures; Azad Film Company; Interactive Studios
- Distributed by: IMGC Global Entertainment
- Release date: 6 October 2014
- Running time: 125 minutes
- Country: Pakistan
- Languages: Urdu, English
- Box office: Rs. 61 million (US$220,000)

O21 (or Operation 21 formerly The Extortionist) is a 2014 Pakistani spy thriller film, directed by Jami, and Summer Nicks and produced by Zeba Bakhtiar and her son Azaan Sami Khan. It is the first spy action thriller movie from Pakistan.

The film, produced by One Motion Pictures, is based on a screenplay by Summer Nicks. Zeba Bakhtiar is the film's executive producer and the lead roles are played by Aamina Sheikh, Shaan Shahid and Ayub Khosa. O21 is the 576th feature film of Shaan's career. The film had a theatrical release on 6 October 2014, coinciding with Eid-ul-Adha. It opened to mixed reviews from critics and grossed 0.61 million Rs. at the box office.

== Plot outline ==
Abdullah (Ayub Khosa), after 30 years of war in Afghanistan, wants to save his country from another 50 years of corporate warfare. He works with his Pakistani ally Kashif Siddiqui (Shaan Shahid) to save the two neighboring countries from further turmoil through a plan that could risk the lives of them and their families. A plan that has 21 hours to be executed.

== Cast ==
- Shaan Shahid as Kashif Siddiqui
- Ayub Khosa as Abdullah
- Aamina Sheikh as Natasha
- Shamoon Abbasi as Danish
- Mustafa Changazi as Shayan
- Hameed Sheikh as Dost Muhammad
- Shakeel Hussain Khan as Deputy
- Iman Ali as Aleeha Siddiqui
- Ayaz Samoo as Mani Abbas
- Ali Raza as Spy
- Gohar Rasheed as Babar
- Hina Rizvi as Zarmeenay
- Bilal Ashraf as Ahmad
- Daniyal Raheal as Jami
- Shakeel Hussain Khan as Deputy
- Tatmain Ul Qulb
- Abdullah Ghaznavi
- Joe Towne as Nathan
- James Hallett as Stan
- Wendy Haines
- Summer Nicks as Jones

== Production ==
The filming began in Karachi in the first quarter of 2013, and over a course of 61 days of shooting spread over 3 spells, was completed in the first quarter of 2014. Filming took place throughout Karachi, Lahore, Balochistan and the Afghan Border. O21 was primarily filmed on Red Epic Cameras with Cooke s4/i lenses however the ARRI Alexa XR was used in certain scenes as well. It was also the first Pakistani film to be mixed in Dolby Atmos.

== Music ==
O21

Soundtrack album
- Released: 6 October 2014
- Recorded: 2014
- Genre: Film score
- Length: 18:57
- Label: One Motion Pictures
- Producer: Alfonso González Aguilar

The score was released on 6 October 2014, and the soundtrack The Kidnapping was released in September. The film score contains three tracks composed and conducted by producer Alfonso González Aguilar.

=== Track listing ===
No.	Title	Music	Length
1.	"Kill Them All"	Alfonso Gonzalez Aguilar	2:06
2.	"Final Move"	Alfonso Gonzalez Aguilar	6:07
3.	"The Kidnapping"	Alfonso Gonzalez Aguilar	10:43

== Reception ==
=== Release ===
The first look teaser was released on 24 May 2014. while the theatrical trailer was unveiled on 21 September 2014 in a press event held in Nueplex Cinemas Karachi. The film was released on Eid Al-Adha 2014.

=== Critical reception ===
Hala Syed of DAWN.com rated the film 4/5 and wrote "It does not glorify war but depicts it in a gritty realistic, thought provoking way. It's engaging, unflinching and unique in that it dares to tell the dark and intense stories in the shadows."

Aayan Mirza of Galaxy Lollywood rated it 4 out of 5 and wrote "O21 is the most intelligent Pakistani cinema has ever been. It won’t spoon feed you everything, you have to make deliberate efforts to remain attentive, conscious and seriously into the film. You can’t miss to watch even an inch of the screen. O21 is absolutely not a propaganda film, but instead presents an intelligent case. It might compel you enough to Google certain things when you get back home. It is a masterpiece that can easily be put right there with any spy-thriller in the world."

Zia Shahid of Sabz Irtiqa rated it 8 out of 10 and wrote "Jami’s direction can be explained in just one word “Stunning”, people who knows Jami for his previous work and have seen his music videos knew that O21 won't be a straightforward film, Jami have certainly made the audience to put their thinking cap on while watching the movie or else they won't understand the film. On the whole O21 is dark and mysterious and it has taken the Pakistani cinema to the new level, thank you Jami for proving that Pakistani cinema is not just about item numbers and Bollywood stereo types."

Faria Syed of HiP wrote "The film is thrilling, visually stunning and well-acted with multiple layers of story. There are no songs to titillate, no simple solutions to facilitate those who would rather not think about what they are watching."

Umer Ali of Skotato rated 4/5 and wrote "It is the best film ever produced in Pakistan in terms of brains and execution and it is a must watch if you are a spy thriller geek."

Zeeshan Ahmed of The Express Tribune rated the film 3.5 out of 5 and gave a verdict "It’s a dense film, one you wouldn’t want to watch again. But do watch it once to embrace the fact that even a Pakistani film can opt for a slow and steady approach towards storytelling."

Afra Jamal of Daily Times wrote "Operation O21 is poised to be a game changer that challenges the palate and forges its own identity from a fragmented landscape. It’s a start."

== Box office ==
O21 made Rs. 5.9 million (US$21,000) on its first day of release. At the end of Eid Week (Monday-Sunday) film collected huge Rs. 41.5 million (US$150,000) from all over Pakistan. But from next Monday onwards numbers started falling heavily which resulted in mere Rs. 7 million (US$25,000) over Weekdays taking Extended Week One of 11 Days to Rs. 48.5 million (US$170,000) which is 6th biggest of 2014 after Kick, Na Maloom Afraad, Bang Bang!, Khoobsurat, and Jai Ho. After low weekdays of week one, movie dipped further in week two and collected mere Rs. 12.9 million (US$46,000) taking grand total to Rs. 61 million (US$220,000).

== Controversy ==
On 7 October (second day of film release) a story was reported that O21 got booed off the screens from two of the single screen cinemas in Karachi; Bambino and Capri. It got replaced in all its shows by Bang Bang! and Na Maloom Afraad, as people started protesting and throwing bottles on screen as the film did not exactly live up to their expectation. Aayan Mirza of Galaxy Lollywood investigated the case by talking with industry insiders and blamed it on film's distributor Distribution Club and wrote "They don’t care whether the film is Pakistani or not, they are merely concerned with their business, so what they do is that the moment they suspect that their Pakistani release might not be as successful on a particular cinema as they had previously thought it to be, they would reach out to the management of that cinema and will have it replaced there completely with one of their own Indian films. To them, it is no money lost, and to cinemas it is healthy occupancy." Further added "This isn’t the first time it has happened, and Distribution Club has been doing it for long. They did the same with Ishq Khuda, with Sultanat and now O21."

On 13 October 2014 film's production team gathered at the Karachi Press Club to address the "injustice" meted out to them by cinema owners of Bambino, Capri and Dreamland for taking down O21 after 25 minutes of screening. On the situation, Muhammad Rizwan of Distribution Club said "The events at Capri, Bambino and Dreamland have not only damaged the film business but our reputation as a distribution company; and therefore not only will we be taking legal action against these cinema owners but we will also stop providing films to these cinemas."

== Awards ==
Distributor	Date announced	Category	Recipient	Result	Ref.
14th Lux Style Awards	16 July 2015	Best Film	O21	Nominated	
14th Lux Style Awards	16 July 2015	Best Film Director	Jami and Summer Nicks	Nominated	
14th Lux Style Awards	16 July 2015	Best Film Actor	Ayub Khoso	Nominated	

== See also ==
- List of highest-grossing Pakistani films
- List of Pakistani films of 2014
