= Rani (2017 TV series) =

2017 Pakistani television series

- Genre: Drama
- Written by: Anwar Gillani
- Directed by: Syed Faisal Bukhari
- Starring: Kinza Hashmi; Babar Ali; Saleem Sheikh; Rajab Butt
- Country of origin: Pakistan
- Original languages: Urdu; Punjabi
- No. of episodes: 41

Production
- Executive producers: Mairaj Uddin; Ahsan Khan

Original release
- Network: Geo Entertainment
- Release: August 22, 2017 – June 15, 2018

Rani is a 2017 Pakistani drama serial directed by Syed Faisal Bukhari and written by Anwar Gilani. Set in a rural area of Punjab, Rani narrates the story of a village girl who suffers due to rivalry within an influential spiritual family in the village.

== Plot ==
Rani, a lively and cheerful village girl, is eager to marry her childhood friend, Bilal. However, Nadir Shah, step-brother of Murad Shah, the spiritual and wealthy person of the village, who wishes to marry Rani, kidnaps Bilal and gets him lynched by his mob and reaches the wedding venue to marry Rani forcibly. But Murad Shah interrupts the marriage and in order to rescue Rani from Nadir and his mother's scheme, marries her. On the other hand, Murad's first wife disapprove of her second marriage and becomes rebellious towards Murad and Rani. With all this enmity around, the serial revolves around the struggle of Rani and Murad.

== Cast ==
- Kinza Hashmi as Rani
- Babar Ali as Shah Murad
- Saleem Sheikh as Nadir Shah
- Asim Bukhari as Shah Ji
- Sahiba Afzal as Faryal
- Saba Faisal as Nafeesa
- Sangeeta as Niaz Begum
- Raheela Agha as Gul Bahar Begum
- Rabia Tabassum as Khush Bakht
- Hiba Aziz as Rimsha
- Aurangzeb Leghari as Qutub Shah
- Khalid Butt as Meher Ali
- Naghma as Zulekha
- Saima Saleem as Firdous
- Imran Bukhari as Fahad
- Rasheed Ali as Ameen
- Kashif Baloch as Saawan
- Rajab Butt as Bilal

== Reception ==
Viewers drew comparison of "Rani" with the serials like "Mil Ke Bhi Hum Na Mile" and "Kaneez", both being directed by Bukhari as well. Babar Ali's character as Murad received praise for his aura and personality on-screen. Whereas, Saleem Shaikh was also lauded for his role as an antagonist. Overall serial, gained good television ratings and received mix reviews for its plot. However, makers and channel were heavily criticized for abrubtly ending the show after 41 episodes.
