= Shakeel Hussain Khan =

Pakistani actor

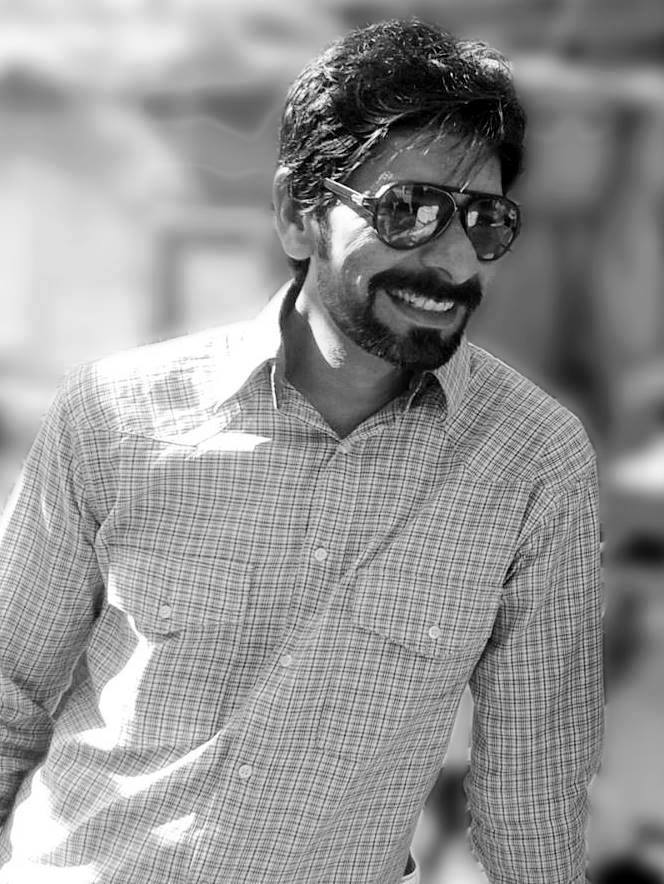
- Born: 11 March 1977 (age 48); Karachi, Sindh, Pakistan
- Years active: 2012–present

Shakeel Hussain Khan (born 11 March 1977) is a Pakistani actor who appears in theatre, television series and films.

== Life and career ==
Shakeel Hussain Khan was born on 11 March 1977 in Karachi, Pakistan. He began his career as a theatre actor and has played various playwrights including The Boor by Anton Chekhov, Die Räuber by Friedrich Schiller, Les Fourberies de Scapin by Molière and Karachi: The Musical by Nida Butt.

He has appeared in various television series in Pakistan. Khan gained public recognition with the television series Heer (2016) in which he played role of 'Paiji' as lead negative. His work in television includes Kash Mey Teri Beti Na Hoti (2012), Kisay Apna Kahain (2014), Aik Pal (2014), Code Name Red (2014), Jannat Ki Hawas (2014), Tootay Huay Taray (2014), and Kharaash (2015).

Khan made his Lollywood debut in the film O21 (2014) which was directed by Jami Mehmood. He also appeared in Maalik (2016) in which he played role of Musa.

== Filmography ==
Film	Role	Year	Notes
O21	Deputy	2014	Debut Movie (Released)
Manto Film	Cameo	2015	(Released)
Jawani Phir Nahi Ani	Cameo	2015	(Released)
Maalik	Musa	2016	(Released) Internationally and Ban lifted in Pakistan
Two Plus Two	Sultan	Unreleased	Upcoming Pakistani Movie
Aazadi	Daakia	2017	Upcoming Pakistani Movie
Altered Skin	Guard	2019	(Released Worldwide) Hollywood Movie
Rock and Raag	Music Shop Owner	2019	Upcoming Pakistani Movie
Mind Games	Shahbaz Khan	2019	Netflix Original Series
Mera Naam Bhi Shaukat Hai	Shaukat	2023	Released on https://www.youtube.com/@ExperimentalFilms

=== Television ===
Television Series	Role	Channel	Production House	Year
Kash Mey Teri Beti Na Hoti	Asghar	GEO Entertainment	Six Sigma Plus	2012
Kisay Apna Kahain	Gangster	HUM TV	Master Mind	2014
Aik Pal	Nadeem	HUM TV	Seventh Sky	2014
Code Name Red	Dollys Reflection	PTV Home	Film Arts Production	2014
Jannat Ki Hawas	Shaani		Private Production	2014
Tootay Huay Taray		ARY Digital	Big Bang Productions	2014
Kharaash	Jasoos	PTV Home	Private Production	2015
Heer	Paiji	GEO Entertainment	AnB Productions	2016
Pujaran	Anwer/Dada	TV One	Cereal Productions	2016
Alif	Akhtar/Writer	Geo Entertainment	Epic Entertainment	2019
Pyar Deewangi Hai	Akram	ARY Digital	Big Bang Entertainment	2022
Bandish 2	Jamal	ARY Digital	Big Bang Entertainment	2023
Mera Sardaar	Nasir	Mun TV	Komal Production	2023
Khushboo Mai Basay Khatt	S.H.O	Hum TV	MD Productions	2024
Gentleman	Head of News	Green TV	Next Level Production	2024
Teri Chhaoon Main	Investigation Officer	Hum TV	MD Production	2024
