= Gila (TV series) =

Pakistani TV series

- گلہ
- Genre: Soap opera; Romance
- Written by: M. Hanif Chauhan
- Directed by: Meer Sikandar
- Starring: Anzela Abbasi; Wahaj Ali; Sukaina Khan
- Opening theme: Singers; Atif Ali; Samra Khan; Lyrics by Sabir Zafar
- Composer: Atif Ali
- Country of origin: Pakistan
- Original language: Urdu
- No. of seasons: 1
- No. of episodes: 77

Production
- Editors: Ikhlaq Ahmed Soomro; Wajahat Hussain
- Camera setup: Multi-camera setup

Original release
- Network: Hum TV, Hum Network Limited
- Release: 5 December 2016 – 31 March 2017

Gila (Urdu: گلہ; lit: Grievance), is a Pakistani television soap opera starring Wahaj Ali along with Anzela Abbasi, daughter of actress Javeria Abbasi.

It was first aired on 5 December 2016, replacing Be Aitbaar. It aired every Monday to Friday at 7:00pm PST.

== Synopsis ==
Anzela, the protagonist of this story, is suffering punishment for a murder she did not commit. The plot begins with Zavaar's murder on the wedding night backed by strong assumptions making Anzela guilty. Sanwal as well as Shaji (Zavaar's Brother) hits chances to marry Anzela. Will Anzela go for Sanwal, her old love, or Shaji, her brother-in-law?

== Cast ==
- Anzela Abbasi as Anzela
- Wahaj Ali as Sanwal/Ramis
- Sukaina Khan as Hafsa
- Fasi Sardar as Zain
- Humaira Bano as Sarwat
- Zainab Jameel as Sana
- Asad Siddiqui as Shajee
- Jahanzeb Khan as Zawaar
- Mohsin Gillani as Sanwal's father
- Javed Jamal as Jalal Mirza
- Naima Khan as Noor Bano
- Saman Ansari as Shaista
- Tabbasum Arif as Atiqa
- Saad Azhar as Khalid
- Mariam Mirza as Bushra
- Anas Ali Imran as Saaff
- Mariyam Khalif (Child star) as Zubi
- Abdul Rehman (Child star) as Hammad

== See also ==
- List of programs broadcast by Hum TV
- 2016 in Pakistani television
