= Main Haar Nahi Manoun Gi =

- Title screen
- Genre: Teen drama
- Written by: Sarah Majeed
- Directed by: Atif Iqbal
- Starring: Anzela Abbasi; Ali Josh; Noaman Sami; Arslan Asad Butt; Saniya Shamshad
- Country of origin: Pakistan
- Original language: Urdu
- No. of episodes: 36

Production
- Producer: Momina Duraid
- Production locations: Karachi, Sindh
- Camera setup: Multi-camera setup
- Production company: Momina Duraid Productions

Original release
- Network: Hum TV
- Release: 19 June – 23 October 2018

Main Haar Nahi Manoun Gi (Urdu: میں ہار نہیں مانوں گی, lit. 'I won't accept defeat') is a Pakistani drama serial that started airing on Hum TV from 19 June 2018. It is produced by Momina Duraid under their production banner Momina Duraid Productions. The serial stars Anzela Abbasi in lead who previously debuted in Hum TV's Gila in 2016.

The serial has a strong female lead protagonist and focuses on gender equality and women's empowerment and explores women journey, generally depicted as the weaker in society.

== Plot ==
A story based on the concept of promoting women, generally portrayed as the weaker gender in society who tends to fight against all odds to achieve success irrespective of any obstacles and hurdles along the way.

== Cast ==
- Anzela Abbasi as Nimra
- Ali Josh as Haroon
- Arslan Asad Butt as Adil Hamdani
- Saniya Shamshad as Arooba
- Noaman Sami as Rohan
- Khalid Butt as Shakeel
- Humera Zahid
- Mariyam Chaudhary
- Saima Syed
- Fozia Mushtaque as Amma

== See also ==
- List of programs broadcast by Hum TV
