= Ayaz Samoo =

Pakistani actor, model, host, VJ and writer

- ایاز سموں
- Born: Karachi, Sindh, Pakistan
- Other names: The Shape-Shifter
- Occupations: Actor; Model; VJ; Writer; Host
- Years active: 2004–present
- Known for: Hosting; Acting; Standup Comedy
- Notable work: Moor; Nand; The Night Show With Ayaz Samoo; The Great Indian Laughter Challenge 2; Comedy Ka King Kaun
- Awards: Best Performance in a Negative Role.
- Website: https://eva1564.hocoos.com/

Ayaz Samoo is a Pakistani actor, model, host, VJ and writer. In 2016, he won the ARY Film Award for Best Actor in a negative role for the film Moor. He is referred to as "The Shape-Shifter" because he switches voices, accents, looks and expressions as he glides through the various genres of the performing arts. He hosts "The Night Show With Ayaz Samoo" on ARY Zindagi. He is best known by his character name Sajid Billa on ARY Musik.

== Early life and career ==
He was born in a Sindhi family. His debut in the industry was in 2004 with a music video for Geo TV. After that he appeared in several television shows and tele films on various Pakistani television channels including Geo TV, The Musik and Indus Music. He was then selected to represent Pakistan by performing for the second season of The Great Indian Laughter Challenge in 2006. This was where he was referred to as the 'Youngest Champion' on the show. From his initial successes in the show, he was asked to participate in another stand-up comedy show 'Super Karara' in Pakistan and he won the title of 'Karara King' in 2007. He further on gave successful performances on Indian shows like "Funjabi Chakde" (Star One), "Comedy Champions" (Sahara One), "Comedy Club" (Sony Sab) and Laugh India Laugh (Life Ok). He then participated on another Indian show "Comedy Ka King Kaun" on Sab TV (India) in 2008 where he competed against 11 of the best Pakistani and Indian stand-ups and Ayaz Samoo won the title of 'Comedy ka king'. Ayaz made his film debut with Jami's spy-thriller O21 followed by Moor. In 2016 he won AFA Best Actor in a Negative Role award for film Moor. He will appear in Aabis Raza's upcoming romantic comedy Maan Jao Naa opposite to Adeel Chaudhry, Hajra Yamin, Asma Abbas, Ghana Ali and Asif Raza Mir.

== Filmography ==
Year	Title	Role	Notes
2014	O21	Maani Abbas	
2015	Moor	Imtisal Ahmad	
2016	Aksbandh	Sunny	co-written & co-produced
2018	Maan Jao Naa	Asim	

== Television (serials, telefilms and shows) ==
Year	Name	Role	Network	Notes
2004	Ae Jawan	Model	Geo TV	Song
2005	Chalo Aagay	Faisal (Actor)	Geo TV	Telefilm
2005	Ambulance	Doctor (Actor)	Indus Vision	Drama Serial
2009	Gobar Singh	Shehri Babu (Actor)	ARY Digital	Telefilm
2009	Jhoot Bole Kawa Kaatay	Rameez (Actor)	ARY Digital	Telefilm
2009	Gaddi Late Hai	Saeen (Actor)	ARY Digital	Telefilm
2009	Welay Awards	Sahib Lodhi (Actor)	ARY Digital	Comedy Show
2009	College	Imtiaz (Actor)	PTV	Drama Serial
2009	Masti Ki Paatshala	Bobby (Actor)	ARY Digital	Sitcom
2009-13	Sajid Billa a.k.a. Sajid DvD	Host	ARY Musik	Comedy Show
2009	Joke Studio	Creative Team	ARY Musik	Comedy Show
2010	Billu Barbar 2	Jhallan (Actor)	ARY Digital	Telefilm
2010	I am Joking	VJ	ARY Musik	Comedy Show
2010	Eid on Demand	VJ	ARY Musik	Comedy Show
2010	Jeena to yahi hai	Special Appearance	ARY Digital	Sitcom
2010	Bakra Masti	VJ	ARY Musik	Comedy Show
2011	Dabang 2	Photographer (Cameo)	ARY Digital	Telefilm
2011	Purjosh	Expert	ARY News	Cricket Show
2011-13	Mirchi Live – Halaat D Maamay	VJ	ARY Musik	Comedy Show
2011	Good Morning Pakistan	Sajid Billa (Co-host)	ARY Digital	Morning Show
2011	Qasai Says	VJ	ARY Musik	Comedy Show
2012	Shadi Mubarak	Papu (Actor)	ARY Digital	Drama Serial
2012	Topi Drama	Bobby (Actor)	ARY Digital	Drama Serial
2012	Haseena Chalbaaz	Sameer (Actor)	Express Entertainment	Drama Serial
2012	Khushi Ek Roag	Jahanzaib (Actor)	ARY Digital	Drama Serial
2012	Band Bajega	(Cameo)	ARY Digital	Drama Serial
2012	Bhabhi Sambhal Chaabi	Taimoor (Actor)	Urdu 1	Drama Serial
2012	Ghar Aye Mehmaan	Zubair (Actor)	Hum TV	Telefilm
2012	Indo Pak Festival	Host	ARY Zauq	Cooking Show
2013	Kitni Girhain Baqi Hain	Munna (Actor)	Hum TV	Telefilm
2013-15	Meri Maa	Shafqat (Actor)	Geo TV	Drama Serial
2013	Mandi Ka King Kaun	Host	ARY Musik	Comedy Show
2013-14	Teen Kahani	Ayaz (Actor)	Hum TV	Sitcom
2014	Gullu Weds Guggi	Actor	ARY Digital	Drama Serial
2014	Guru Hoja Shuru	Guest VJ	ARY Musik	Game Show
2014-15	Video On Trial	Host	ARY Musik	Musik Show
2015	Dimaagh Ki Ghanti Live	Host	ARY Musik	Game Show
2015	Campus Star	Host	ARY Musik	Game Show
2015	Shan e Ramazan	Gappu (Segment host)	ARY Digital	Ramadan Transmission
2015	Batashay	Ayaz (Actor)	ARY Digital	Sitcom
2015	Bhoot Kahan Hai?	VJ	ARY Musik	Horror Show
2015	Mr Fraudiye	VJ	ARY Musik	Comedy Show
2015	Dil Haari	Muddasir (Actor)	ARY Zindagi	Drama Serial
2016	Karachi Kings Family Festival	Performer	ARY News	Live Event
2016	Dr. Ejaz Ki Zoja	Musaleen (Actor)	Hum TV	Telefilm
2016	Bhatti & DD	Parvez (Actor)	TV One	Eid al-Fitr day special Telefilm
2016	Dulha Mil Gya	Altaf (Actor)	Hum TV	Eid al-Fitr day special Telefilm
2016	Saheliyan	Shahnawaz (Actor)	ARY Digital	Drama Serial
2016	Eid Hungama	Ali (Actor)	PTV	Eid al-Adha day special Telefilm
2016	Dosti Ke Side Effects	Salman (Actor)	ARY Digital	Eid al-Adha day special Telefilm
2016	Musik Trivia	VJ	ARY Musik	Game Show
2017	Mein Aur Tum 2.0	Ayaz (Actor/Writer)	ARY Digital	Sitcom
2017	Mein Mehru Hoon	Maani (Actor)	ARY Digital	Drama Serial
2017	Tere Naal Love Hogya	Saadi (Actor)	Play Entertainment	Drama Serial
2017	Madventures Season 3	Celebrity Contestant	ARY Zindagi	Game Show
2018	Afra Tafrih	Ustaad (Actor)	PTV	Telefilm
2018	Ehd E Ramadan	Host	Express Entertainment	Ramadan Transmission
2018	Meri Baji	Haseeb (Actor)	ARY Digital	Drama Serial
2019	Hasad	Salman (Actor)	ARY Digital	Drama Serial
2019	Janbaaz	ASI Dildaar Khan (Actor)	PTV Home & Express Entertainment	Drama Serial
2019	Dolly Darling	Chintu (Actor)	Geo Entertainment	Sitcom
2020	Nand	Hasan (Actor)	ARY Digital	Drama Serial
2021	ARY Celebrity League	As himself	ARY Digital	Cricket Show
2021	Lucky Kabootar	Inspector Nanna (Actor)	Hum tv	Eid al-Adha day special Telefilm
2021	Mein Hari Piya	Salman (Actor)	Ary Digital	Drama Serial
2021	Mr & Mrs Chooza (eid telefilm)	Fahad (Actor)	Ary Digital	Eid al-Adha day special Telefilm
2022	Afra Tafrih	Shahid (Actor)	Hum Tv	Eid al-Fitr day special
2022	Janay Bhi Do Yaaron	Taimoor (Actor)	PTV	Eid al-Fitr day special
2022	Band To Ab Bajega	Ali (Actor)	Aaj Tv	Telefilm
2022	Chandraat aur Chandni	Mony (Actor)	Ary Digital	Eid al-Adha day special
2022	Wafa Ke Musafir	Salman (Actor)	PTV	Telefilm
2023-present	THE NIGHT SHOW WITH AYAZ SAMOO	Host	ARY Zindagi	Talk show
2023	Pyar, Paisa aur Eid	Ali (Actor)	PTV	Eid al-Fitr day special
2024	Tamasha 3	Himself	Ary Digital	Reality Show

== Stand-up comedy shows ==
Year	Name	Genre	Channel	Notes
2005	Comedy Club	Stand Up Comedian	ARY Digital	
2006	The Great Indian Laughter Challenge 2	Stand Up Comedian	Star One	Quarter finalist
2006–07	Super Karara	Stand Up Comedian	AAJ TV	Winner of the show
2007	The Great Indian Laughter Challenge 3	Stand Up Comedian	Star One	Titled as the youngest champion
2008	Show Man Show	Stand Up Comedian	PTV	
2008	Eid Hungama	Stand Up Comedian	PTV	
2008	Funjabbi Chak De	Stand Up Comedian	Star One	
2008	Comedy Champions	Stand Up Comedian	Sahara One	
2008	Comedy Ka King Kaun	Stand Up Comedian	Sony SAB	Winner of the show
2008	Comedy Club	Stand Up Comedian	Sony SAB	
2008	King Is King	Stand Up Comedian	Ary Digital	
2009	Comedy Kings	Stand Up Comedian	Ary Digital	
2009	Comedy Kings – Ek Naya Tamasha	Stand Up Comedian	ARY Digital	
2010	Comedy Kings – Zara Hat Ke	Stand Up Comedian	ARY Digital	
2010	Awami Budget aur Hukumati Budget	Stand Up Comedian	AAJ TV	
2010	Comedy Kings Ka Shahenshah Kon	Stand up Comedy	ARY Digital	
2012	Laugh India Laugh	Standup Comedian	Life Ok	
2013	Comedy Kings The Real Muqabla (PAK VS INDIA)	Standup Comedian	ARY Digital	

== Awards and nominations ==
Year	Award	Nominated work	Category	Result
2016	2nd ARY Film Awards	Moor	Best Actor in a Negative Role	Won
