= Haze (2016 film) =

- Directed by: David Burkman
- Written by: David Burkman
- Produced by: Jayme Aronberg; David Burkman
- Starring: Kirk Curran; Mike Blejer; Jeremy O'Shea; Kristin Rogers; Sophia Medley
- Cinematography: David Burkman; Jeff McCutcheon; Akiva Potok
- Edited by: Ryan Carpenter; Tony Leech; Matthew McClain
- Music by: Daniel Rogers
- Production companies: Shadywood Road Productions, LLC
- Distributed by: Gravitas Ventures
- Release dates: March 2016 (SLO Film Festival); 13 October 2017
- Running time: 112 minutes
- Country: United States
- Language: English

Haze is a 2017 American psychological thriller drama film directed by David Burkman, starring Kirk Curran, Mike Blejer, Jeremy O'Shea, Kristin Rogers, and Sophia Medley.

== Cast ==
- Kirk Curran as Nick
- Mike Blejer as Pete
- Jeremy O'Shea as Taylor
- Kristin Rogers as Mimi
- Sophia Medley as Sophie
- Paul Savage as Chad
- Nicholas Kedrock as Fish
- Raamin Samiyi as Anoush
- Ryan Fearson as Christian
- Aaron Stein as Trevor
- Drew Sinclair as Brent
- Doug Henderson as Tim
- Matthew McClain as Killman
- Shaz Khan as Degan
- Nyk Schmalz as AJ
- Michael O'Neil Callaghan as Lerner
- Mike Mullauer as Fillmore
- Dane Coates as Brody

== Reception ==
Noel Murray of the Los Angeles Times wrote that "it’s so fresh, it’s raw."

Dennis Harvey of Variety wrote that the film is "accomplished, energetic and sufficiently smarter than its milieu."
