= Aks (TV series) =

- Title screen
- Genre: Drama
- Written by: Sarwat Nazir
- Directed by: Nadeem Siddique
- Starring: Zhalay Sarhadi; Mohib Mirza; Saba Hameed; Aiza Khan; Naila Jaffri
- Country of origin: Pakistan
- Original language: Urdu
- No. of episodes: 23

Production
- Running time: ~45 minutes

Original release
- Network: ARY Digital
- Release: 29 August 2012 – 6 February 2013

Aks (Urdu: عکس, lit. 'Reflection') is a 2012 Pakistani drama serial which aired on ARY Digital every Wednesday since 29 August 2012. The serial is directed by Nadeem Siddiqui and written by Sarwat Nazir, starring Zhalay Sarhadi, Mohib Mirza, Saba Hameed, Aiza Khan and Naila Jaffri. The serial was last aired on 5 February 2013. It was also aired in India on Zindagi under the title Katha... Do Behnon Ki.

== Overview ==
The betrayal of one will give birth to the greed of another. AKS is the story of two sisters, who in their youth were torn apart both in relations and emotions, because of a lack of trust and false accusations. A conflict that later on is transferred to their children, forcing an already troubled family into further despair.

== Plot ==
Zakia lives with her three daughters and husband. Her two elder daughters, Zohra and Zooni are from her previous marriage. It is revealed that her previous husband kicked her out of the house when she gave birth to a third daughter and refused to believe that was his daughter. That baby died as it was very cold on the streets and Zakia's first husband refused to have any mercy on her. Zakia's older sister (Shahbano) is married to her first husband's elder brother so is Zakia's 'jaithani' as well. She, too supported Zakia's husband as she didn't want to leave the luxurious life. Zakia had no support so was kicked out of the house. Zakia then remarries a poorer man.

In the present Zakia's daughters have grown up and Zohra's marriage has been fixed to her step-taya's son. Then Shahbano re-enters their lives and is now an even richer, affluent woman and asks for Zohra's hand for her son Shah-Nawaz. However Zooni likes Shah-Nawaz as he is rich so he can fulfill her desire of having a big house, with cars, servants and status. Zohra marries Shah-Nawaz and Zooni tries to ruin her sister's marriage. Thus the two sisters' (Shahbano and Zakia) destiny re-collides and history repeats itself (hence the title Aks) as wealth again ruins the relationship of two sisters (Zooni and Zohra).

== Cast ==
- Zhalay Sarhadi Zohra Jawed
- Mohib Mirza as Shahnawaz
- Saba Hameed as Shahbano (Zahida)
- Aiza Khan as Zoonehrah Javed (Zooni)
- Naila Jaffri as Zakia Ismael
- Sukaina Khan as Saima
- Naeema Garaj as Naila
- Rubina Arif as Atiqa
- Faizan Khawaja
