= Sabahat Ali Bukhari =

Pakistani actress

- Born: Sabahat Bukhari; 25 October 1968 (age 57); Lahore, Pakistan
- Education: Government Girls College Lahore
- Occupations: Actress; Model; Newscaster
- Years active: 1989 – present
- Children: 1

Sabahat Ali Bukhari (born 25 October 1968) is a Pakistani actress. She is known for her roles in dramas Baby, Naik Parveen, Hari Hari Churiyaan, Sanam, Qismat Ka Likha and Aakhir Kab Tak.

== Early life ==
Sabahat was born on 25 October 1968 in Lahore, Pakistan. She completed her studies from Government Girls College Lahore.

== Career ==
Sabahat started as an news presenter in 1989 on PTV. In 1995 she made her debut as an actress in PTV dramas. She has been noted for her roles in dramas Koi Nahi Apna, Surkh Jorra, Kaisi Khushi Le Ke Aya Chand, Shanakht, Ghar Aik Jannat and Shikwa. Sabahat also used to host morning show Subah Bakhair Vibe Ke Saath on Vibe TV. Then she appeared in dramas Sanam, Naik Parveen, Hari Hari Churiyaan, Baby and Be Aitbaar. Since then she has appeared in dramas Beti Jaisi, Mein Jeena Chahti Hoon, Qismat Ka Likha and Aakhir Kab Tak.

== Personal life ==
Sabahat is married and has one son.

== Filmography ==
=== Television ===
Year	Title	Role	Network
2008	Nestlé Nido Young Stars	Herself	Geo TV
2008	Chaudhween Ka Chand	Shaina	Hum TV
2009	Bol Meri Machli	Khala	Geo Entertainment
2010	Bahu Raniyan	Aapa	Express Entertainment
2011	Band Khirkyon Kay Peechay	Bibi	TV One
2011	Meri Subha Ka Sitara	Ayan's mother	Geo Entertainment
2011	Mera Naseeb	Zahida	Hum TV
2011	Khandan-e-Shughlia	Begum	ARY Digital
2012	Aankh Bhar Asman	Shaddo	PTV
2012	Jazeera	Shaukat Begum	Urdu 1
2012	Raju Rocket	Nadeem's mother	Hum TV
2013	Ideals	Qudsia	TV One
2013	Humnasheen	Alishba's mother	Hum TV
2013	Na Mehram	Ms. Malik	TV One
2013	Kankar	Fayka	Hum TV
2014	Mere Apnay	Athar's mother	ARY Digital
2014	Shikwa	Zeba	ARY Digital
2014	Haq Mahr	Hira's mother	ARY Digital
2014	Shanakht	Huma	Hum TV
2014	Chandni	Basim's mother	Express Entertainment
2014	Koi Nahi Apna	Rabia	ARY Digital
2015	Mere Khuda	Rihana	Hum TV
2015	Ghar Aik Jannat	Saba	Geo TV
2015	Surkh Jorra	Sobia	Hum Sitaray
2016	Kaisi Khushi Le Ke Aya Chand	Jameela Begum	A-Plus
2016	Thoda Sa Aasman	Aapa	Geo TV
2016	Pasheman	Shama Begum	Express Entertainment
2016	Funkari	Hoorain	TV One
2016	Be Aitbaar	Nausheen Begum	Hum TV
2016	Baba Ki Rani	Fatima	ARY Zindagi
2016	Sanam	Farhan's mother	Hum TV
2017	Aye Zindagi	Alina's aunt	Hum TV
2017	Baby	Shayan	Express Entertainment
2017	Zard Zamano Ka Sawera	Fariha Begum	ARY Digital
2017	Hari Hari Churiyaan	Najma	Geo Entertainment
2018	Naik Parveen	Roshan Ara	Geo TV
2018	Beti Jaisi	Romana	Geo Entertainment
2019	Qismat Ka Likha	Nafisa	Express Entertainment
2020	Mein Jeena Chahti Hoon	Rania	Express Entertainment
2020	Muhabbat Khel Tamasha	Maryam's mother	TV One
2021	Iman Aur Yaqeen	Namrah	Aaj Entertainment
2021	Aakhir Kab Tak	Neelofar	Hum TV
2022	Dikhawa Season 3	Ruqayya	Geo Entertainment
2022	Saaya 2	Naila	Geo Tv
2022	Pyar Deewangi Hai	Sajida	ARY Digital
2022	Betiyaan	Jahanara Begum	ARY Digital
2023	Ahsaas	Rabia	Express Entertainment
2023	Hostel	Huma	Aan TV
2023	Bandish 2	Samina	ARY Digital
2023	Shanaas	Raheela	Green Entertainment
2023	Daurr	Bilal's mother	Green Entertainment
2023	Apney Hee Tou Hain	Tabbasum	Green Entertainment
2023	Qabeel	Choti Maa	Aur Life
2023	Mein Kahani Hun	Faiza	Express Entertainment
2023	Pyari Nimmo	Reena	Geo Entertainment
2024	Burns Road Kay Romeo Juliet	Rashida	ARY Digital
2024	Dil Manay Naa	Naila	Green Entertainment
2024	Mumkin	Ghazala	Aur Life
2024	Aapa Shameem	Arifa	ARY Digital
2024	Iqtidar	Shehnaz	Green Entertainment
2025	Inteha	Farida	ARY Digital
2025	Humnava	Afreen	Green Entertainment
2026	Bus Aik Tum Hi	Fouzia	PTV
2026	Rehmat	Samina	ARY Digital

=== Telefilm ===
Year	Title	Role
2012	Saraab	Ms. Anwar
2023	Ghar To Akhir Apna Hai	Shaista

=== Film ===
Year	Title	Role
2018	Maan Jao Naa	Faris's mother

== Awards and nominations ==
Year	Award	Category	Result	Title	Ref.
2019	Apna Karachi Awards	Best Supporting Actress	Won	Herself	
