= Hameed Sheikh =

Pakistani actor and producer

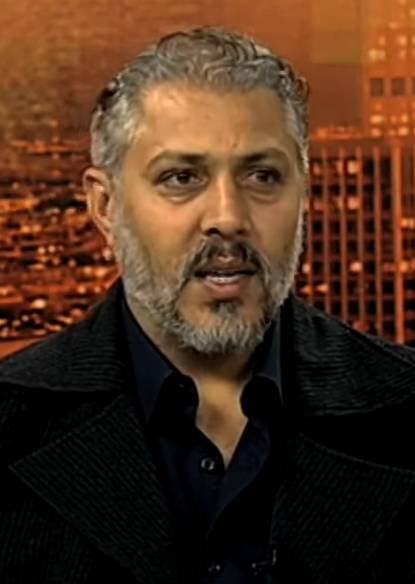
- Sheikh in 2015
- Born: 28 December 1969 (age 56); Quetta, Balochistan, Pakistan
- Occupations: Actor, producer, translator, cultural heritage consultant
- Known for: Khuda Kay Liye; Moor; 021; The Old Man

Hameed Sheikh (Urdu: حمید شیخ) is a Pakistani film and television actor, director, producer, and professional language translator. In film and TV, he is best known for Khuda Kay Liye, Operation O21 and Moor.

From 2022 to 2024, Hameed Sheikh served as on-set language and cultural consultant for the US series The Old Man, starring Jeff Bridges.

Sheikh has worked for years to bring his native Pakistani society into better focus via film and television, while lamenting the lack of government support within these cultures.

== Personal life ==
Sheikh was born on 28 December 1969 in Quetta, the capital city of Balochistan, Pakistan. His family has been living there for 600 years and he has described his ethnic background as "Brahmin Pundits" who had converted to Islam. Sheikh is fluent in Urdu, Brahui, Sindhi, Punjabi, Dari, Persian, Seraiki, Balochi and Hindko.

In a 2019 interview Sheikh stated, "There is a wealth of resources that we can use if we get support from Pakistan’s film industry and the government. We don’t even have an arts council in Quetta, let alone any infrastructure. How can we get anything done?"

Hameed Sheikh has been living in Los Angeles since 2021.

== Career ==
=== Kandahar Break ===
In 2008, Sheikh produced Kandahar Break, a political thriller set in 1999 about a British engineer escaping the Taliban regime in Afghanistan. While filming a night scene in the desert, a group associated with the Taliban attacked the Pakistani members of the film crew. Four crew members were shot while leaving the compound and arriving at the set; they all survived. Much like the lead character of the movie, director David Whitney and his crew were forced to leave Pakistan with the help of local security forces. Only 75% of the shoot was completed by then. Later, Sheikh arranged funding for the remaining part, which was filmed in Tunisia.

=== Moor ===
Sheikh was approached by Jami, director and writer of Moor, to play the role of an old man whose family was affected by the closure of a railway station in Zhob Valley, Baluchistan. In preparation for the role, Sheikh gained a lot of weight and changed his posture and gait (walking style). He described his role as "genuinely challenging," but didn't charge a fee for the project since he believed the film would open doors for young actors of Baluchistan.

== Filmography ==
=== Film ===
Year	Title	Role	Director	Notes
2007	Khuda Kay Liye	Sher Shah	Shoaib Mansoor	
2009	Kandahar Break: Fortress of War	Omar Baloch	David Whitney	Also producer
2013	Hearts and Minds	Tariq	Charlie Guillen	Winner, Jury Prize, Alexandria Film Festival
2014	O21	Dost Muhammad	Jami	
2015	Abdullah: The Final Witness	Abdullah	Hashim Nadeem	Screened at Cannes Film Festival
2015	Moor	Wahid	Jami	Pashto and English
2019	The Man from Kathmandu	Pundit Harvashdam	Pema Dhondup	Nepali film
2020	Away, Together	Rashid	Sana Malik	
2021	The Window	Abid	Ammar Lasani	

=== Television series ===
Year	Title	Role	Director	Notes
1984	Naqab Sang			
1990	Palay Khan			
1993	Baarish Kay Baad	Nasir		
1993	Babar	Muhammad Ali		
1995	Kal		-	Co-produced with Jamal Shah
1995	Uraan	Bahadur		
1996	Wapsi		-	
1997	Wapsi Kay Baad		Muhammad Nawaz Magsi	
2000	Zanjeer	Ali Jan	Syed Faisal Bukhari	
19--	Ishq		Babar Javed	
19--	Matti		Amanullah Nasir	

== Awards and nominations ==
- 2005 The 1st Indus Drama Awards: Nominated for Best Actor Drama Serial in a Supporting Role

== See also ==
- List of Lollywood actors
