= Karachi: The Musical =

Pakistani stage musical

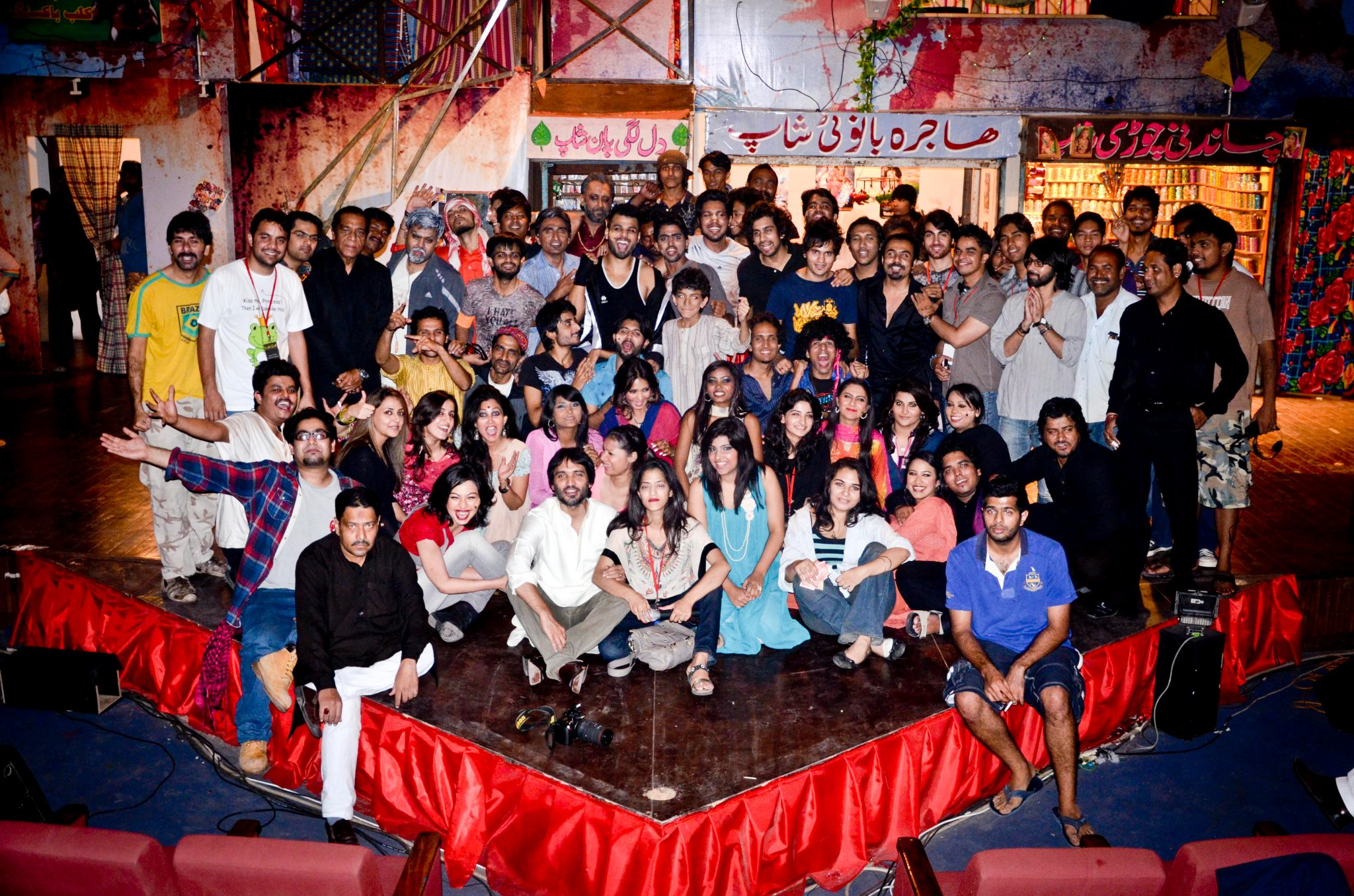
Karachi: The Musical

Karachi: The Musical is Pakistan's first original Broadway-style Urdu musical, with music by Hamza Jafri and lyrics by Faraz Lodhi. Set in the Lyari area of Karachi, the story revolves around an aspiring boxer, Saif Salam, who travels from Mailsi to train with the country's best boxing coach, Ghulam Bashir. It guest-starred Munawar Saeed as Dara Jokhio, a former gangster.

== Productions ==
The musical opened in Karachi on 22 October 2011 and ran until 13 November. An all Pakistan tour was planned for March 2012. The show's band included Asad Zafar (Guitarist), Sheraz (Tabla), Manzoor Ahmed (Violinist), Joshua Fernandes (Drummer), and Danish Manzoor (Keyboardist).

- Director, Producer and Choreographer: Nida Butt
- Writers: Faraz Lodhi and Uns Mufti
- Co Producer: Waqas Bukhari
- Assistant Director: Alina Iftikhar
- Production Manager: Usman Mazhar
- Volunteer Head: Eleyna Haroun
- Lighting Director: Amna Soomro
- Set Designer: Khizer Farooq Aslam Bandey
- Photographer: Adil Mufti

== Synopsis ==
Saif Salam (Imam Syed) travels from Mailsi, Multan to train with Pakistan's best boxing coach, Ghulam Bashir (Faraz Lodhi), who owned the Ghulam Bashir Boxing Club in Lyari. But there is one catch: Bashir has not coached anyone in the last two decades since he had a falling out with his best friend Daud Islam (Adnan Jaffar), who now runs the local mafia that controls drugs, prostitution, and betting houses in one of the most troubled parts of the city.

As Saif learns how to spar, he realizes that his decision to train for a professional boxing career has sparked tension between age-old rivals, put the livelihood of thousands in the area at risk, and exposed his family to grave danger.

== Cast ==
- Faraz Lodhi as Ghulam Bashir
- Syed Adnan Jaffar as Daud Islam, the local gangster.
- Imam Syed as Saif Salam
- Rubya Chaudhry as Yasmeen, a reporter
- Munawar Saeed as Dara Jokhio, a former gangster, who still holds sway over the area.
- Raza Shah as Raza Baloch, a former boxer who is on the run from the law.
- Monazza Fatima Naqvi as Tabassum (Tabu)
- Younas Khan as Mir
- Merium Azmi as Selina
- Aryaan Aslam as KK
- Kamal Hussain as Raheem Ibad
- Muhammad Shakeel Hussain Khan as Jugnu
- Arshad Malik: Arsi
- Hamid Yousuf Khan as Sikandar
- Asif Shehzad Malik as Saniullah/News Reporter/Yasir Khan
- Ahsan Ali as Wajiullah/News Reporter/Imam
- Zakiullah Khan as Inspector Rehman/Asif
- Danish Hayat as Clement

== Songs ==
An official soundtrack for the Musical was released which consists of the first six songs.

1. Lyari
2. Karachi
3. Ek Sae Dus (One to ten)
4. Aaye Re Main Aaye
5. Babu Bhai
6. Left Right Jab
7. Chaand
8. Shor Machao
9. Jin
10. Aur De
11. Daaka
12. New York
