= Zeenat Bint-e-Sakina Hazir Ho =

- A promotional image
- Genre: Drama
- Written by: Mumtaz Bukhari
- Directed by: Mohammad Naeem Khan
- Starring: Sanam Baloch; Faisal Shah; Mustafa Qureshi; Khayyam Sarhadi; Qaisar Khan Nizamani; Yasir Nawaz; Sohail Asghar; Mumtaz Kanwal; Rashid Farooqui; Naila Jaffri; Shamim Hilaly
- Country of origin: Pakistan
- Original language: Urdu
- No. of episodes: 14

Production
- Producer: Mehroz Karim
- Running time: 35-40 minutes

Original release
- Network: Geo TV
- Release: 16 March – 15 June 2010

Zeenat Bint-e-Sakina Hazir Ho (Urdu: زینت بنت سکینہ حاضر ہو) is a Pakistani television drama series that was aired on Geo TV from 16 March 2010 till 15 June 2010. The serial is written by Mumtaz Bukhari and directed by Mohammad Naeem Khan. It is based on true events, set against the drawbacks of the prevailing feudal system in parts of Pakistan.

== Plot ==
Zeenat and Lakhmeer Khan, unaware of the consequences, decide to marry against the wishes of their families. Both families decide to punish the couple for daring to marry without their families' approval. Bilal is accused of kidnapping and raping Shumaila. The couple is forced to live apart. Because of the allegations, Lakhmeer now faces life threats from certain elements who want to punish him for the crimes he supposedly committed. Zeenat is pressurised to go against Lakhmeer in the court and Lakhmeer is pressurised to claim that he never married Zeenat.

== Cast ==
- Sanam Baloch
- Faisal Shah
- Mustafa Qureshi
- Khayyam Sarhadi
- Naila Jaffri
- Qaisar Khan Nizamani
- Shamim Hilaly
- Yasir Nawaz
- Sohail Asghar
- Mumtaz Kanwal
- Rashid Farooqui

== Facts ==
A serial that is based for the most part on true stories and has been filmed in real locations in Pakistan including Sukkur, Karachi, Jamshoro, Rahim Yar Khan and Pir Jo Goth. Almost all judicial proceedings and judges remarks have been taken from real life cases, highlighting how common the story is for couples who marry of their own free will.
