= Aksbandh =

- Directed by: Emran Hussain
- Written by: Emran Hussain; Ayaz Samoo
- Produced by: Naveed Arshad; Seemeen Naveed; Emran Hussain
- Starring: Ayaz Samoo; Danial Afzal Khan; Saud Imtiaz; Shehzeen Rahat; Mahrukh Rizvi; Bilal Yousufzai; Arshad Ali
- Cinematography: Farrukh Hussain
- Edited by: Zack & Yasir Qazi
- Music by: Ajay Gupta
- Production companies: Big Idea Entertainment; Cinematic Media
- Distributed by: Hum Films
- Release date: 20 May 2016
- Running time: 89 minutes
- Country: Pakistan
- Languages: Urdu & English
- Budget: PKR 5.5 million
- Box office: PRK 2.0 million

Aksbandh (previously Paranormal Karachi Nights) is a supernatural found footage horror film released in 2016, the first film of its kind from Pakistan. It was produced, written, and directed by Emran Hussain and co-written by Ayaz Samoo. Aksbandh was produced under the production banner of Cinematic Media and Big Idea Entertainment. The film features an assembled cast that includes Ayaz Samoo, Saud Imtiaz, Danial Afzal, Bilal Yousufzai, Shehzeen Rahat, Mahrukh Rizvi, and Arshad Ali.

The film was distributed by Hum Films on 20 May 2016 in cinemas nationwide.

== Plot ==
The plot of movie resolves around six friends who set out on a fun adventure trip to Drigh Lake in Larkana, to make a small budget horror film. However, when the trip takes a nasty turn, the six friends find themselves mixed up in paranormal activities.

== Cast ==
- Ayaz Samoo as Sunny
- Danial Afzal Khan as Ayaan
- Saud Imtiaz as Shehzad
- Shehzeen Rahat as Sadia
- Bilal Yousufzai as Raheel
- Mahrukh Rizvi as Aaliya
- Arshad Ali as Chacha

== Production ==
Aksbandh was completely shot and produced in Pakistan, except for sound recording and mixing, which was done in India.

== Marketing and release ==
A teaser trailer for Aksbandh was revealed on 15 November 2015. The theatrical trailer and final poster for the film was released on 23 April 2016. The film was released across Pakistani cinemas on 20 May 2016.

== Reception ==
A review in Dawn found that "This experiment by ad-makers-turned-producers Naveed Arshad and Seemeen Naveed will no doubt help the film industry along in a big way; irrespective of box office results. Times are now a changing and if we can have more projects like Aksbandh, the future is definitely bright for independent Pakistani films." Another review called the film "a spooky treat". The News International found the film "surprisingly good".

== See also ==
- List of Pakistani films of 2016
