= Naila Jaffri =

Pakistani actress (1965–2021)

- Born: Naila Ali Jaffri; 27 January 1965; Islamabad, Pakistan
- Died: 17 July 2021 (aged 56); Karachi, Pakistan
- Education: University of Rawalpindi
- Occupations: Actress; Director
- Years active: 1980s - 2021
- Relatives: Atif Jaffri (brother)

Naila Jaffri was a Pakistani actress and director. She was known for her roles in dramas Woh, Ek Kasak Reh Gayi, Mausam, Anaya Tumhari Hui and Tera Mera Rishta.

== Early life ==
Naila was born on 27 January 1965 in Islamabad, Pakistan.

== Career ==
Jaffri started acting on PTV in the 1980s and also did theatre. She was noted for her roles in dramas Ek Mohabat Sau Afsaney, Sanam Gazida, Mujh ko Satana, Desi Girls and Thodi Si Khushiyan. After that she also appeared in dramas Don't Jealous, Noorpur Ki Rani, Lamha Lamha Zindagi, Zeenat Bint-e-Sakina Hazir Ho and Sanjha. She later appeared in dramas Surkh Jorra, Tera Mera Rishta, Aks, Anaya Tumhari Hui, Mausam, Ghalti, Marasim and Ek Kasak Reh Gayi. Her last appearance was in Dushman as Durri which was broadcast posthumously on PTV.

== Personal life ==
Naila was married but after sometime they divorced.

== Illness and death ==
Naila was a cancer survivor, and had had ovarian cancer. She died from cancer on 17 July 2021, at age 56. Her funeral was held in Tooba Mosque in DHA Phase 2 Karachi and she was laid to rest in the Army graveyard near Kalapul, Karachi.

== Filmography ==
=== Television ===
Year	Title	Role	Network
1986	Pehchaan	Rabia	PTV
1992	Dard Kay Faslay	Bhabhi	PTV
1995	Kali Deemak	Suzi	PTV
1996	Ilzam	Lubna	PTV
1997	Family 93	Huma	PTV
1998	Uljhan	Minal	PTV
1998	Sanam Gazida	Zeba	PTV
1998	Ek Mohabat Sau Afsaney	Asad's mother	PTV
2002	Phir Youn Love Hua	Seema	PTV
2002	Tere Siwa	Shireen	PTV
2007	Husna Aur Husan Ara	Dilshad Begum	TV One
2008	Sirf Aik Bar	Rumaila's mother	TV One
2009	Noorpur Ki Rani	Shahida	Hum TV
2010	Don't Jealous	Alishba's mother	TV One
2010	Rishtay Mohabbaton Kay	Asma	Hum TV
2010	Zeenat Bint-e-Sakina Hazir Ho	Sakina's mother	Geo TV
2011	Lamha Lamha Zindagi	Tahira	ARY Digital
2011	Dil Hy Chota Sa	Kehkashan's mother	Geo TV
2011	Sanjha	Shabana	Hum TV
2012	Aks	Zakia Ismael	ARY Digital
2013	Ek Kasak Reh Gayi	Ammi	Geo Entertainment
2013	Woh	Ruqaiya	Hum TV
2014	Mausam	Fazila	Hum TV
2014	Marasim	Sheher Bano	A-Plus
2014	Khata	Shabana	ARY Digital
2014	Nazdikiyan	Sajida	ARY Digital
2015	Anaya Tumhari Hui	Safia	Hum TV
2015	Tera Mera Rishta	Muraad's mother	Geo TV
2015	Surkh Jorra	Sadia	Hum Sitaray
2016	Tere Dar Per	Hajra	ARY Digital
2016	Baray Dhokhe Hain Iss Raah Mein	Aiman's mother	A-Plus
2016	Jaltay Gulab	Asia	TV One
2016	Ghalti	Suriya	A-Plus
2016	Khushboo ka Safar	Zara	TV One
2017	Munkir	Kulsoom Bano	TV One
2018	Subh Saverey Samaa Kay Saath	Herself	Samaa TV
2019	Good Morning Pakistan	Herself	ARY Digital
2021	Piyare Ramzan Iftar Transmission	Herself	Express Entertainment
2022	Dushman	Mai Waddi/ Durri	PTV

=== Web series ===
Year	Title	Role	Network
2020	Aas	Shireen	

=== Telefilm ===
Year	Title	Role
1999	Aur Dhoop Thahr Gai	Bua
2010	Un Ki Surat Nazar Aye To	Shaheena
2011	Qusoorwar	Sofia's mother
2011	Tasveer Ka Aik Rukhh	Bua Begum
2011	Wohi Khuda Hai	Chachi
2012	Gumaan	Accident lady
2013	Toota Phoota Hi Sahi	Amma
2018	Kahani Pyar Ki Sitara Ki Mohabat	Sitara's mother

=== Film ===
Year	Title	Role
2012	Josh: Independence Through Unity	Nusrat Bi
2015	Khamoshi	Tayyaba

=== Plays ===
Year	Title	Ref.
2011	Seagull	
2011	Begum Jaan	
