= Rubina Arif =

Pakistani actress

- Born: 15 July 1962 (age 64); Lahore, Pakistan
- Education: Punjab University (Masters in Psychology)
- Occupations: Actress; Producer
- Years active: 1990 – present
- Spouse: Taslim Arif (m. 1981; died 2008)
- Children: 3

Rubina Arif (born 15 July 1962) is a Pakistani actress and producer. She is known for her roles in dramas Ishq Nachaya, Kab Mere Kehlaoge, Qismat Ka Likha and Kam Zarf.

== Early life ==
Rubina was born on 15 July 1962, in Lahore, Pakistan. She completed her studies, a masters in Psychology, from Punjab University.

== Career ==
She made her debut as an actress in 1990. She was known for her work in the drama Ishq Nachaya. She was a very well known actress. She also did modeling and commercials. She was also known for her comedy roles in Hum Sub Umeed Se Hain and known for her multiple roles in Hum Sub Umeed Se Hain. Since then she appeared in dramas Kab Mere Kehlaoge, Bechari Nadia, Qismat, Mera Kiya Qasoor and Kam Zarf.

== Personal life ==
Rubina was married to the cricketer Taslim Arif in 1981. They have three children, two sons and one daughter.All 3 children are happily married.

== Filmography ==
=== Television ===
Year	Title	Role	Network
1997	Aanchal	Ismat	PTV
1998	Kath Puttli	Ammi	PTV
2007	Hum Sub Umeed Se Hain	Firdos Ashiq Awan	Geo Entertainment
2009	Tanveer Fatima (B.A)	Tannu's mother	Geo TV
2011	Extras: The Mango People	Samina	Hum TV
2011	Maaye Ni	Khala	ARY Digital
2012	Raju Rocket	Sameen's mother	Hum TV
2012	Jakaria Kulsoom ki Love Story	Kulsoom's mother	ARY Digital
2012	Aks	Atiqa	ARY Digital
2013	Manzil Na Janay Kahan	Sadiyah	TV One
2013	Dil Apna Preet Parai	Ami Jan	Urdu 1
2013	College	Zona's mother	PTV
2013	Chadar	Ahmed's mother	Urdu 1
2014	Mohabbat Zindabad	Asma	Express Entertainment
2014	Jhooti	Ujala	Express Entertainment
2015	Sartaj Mera Tu Raaj Mera	Sumaila	Hum TV
2016	Ek Pal Ka Malaal	Kashif's mother	Urdu 1
2016	Khushaal Susral	Parveen	ARY Digital
2016	Rab Razi	Ismat	Express Entertainment
2016	Kisay Chahoon	Marina's mother	Hum TV
2016	Ishq Nachaya	Sughra	Express Entertainment
2017	Kalank	Ami Jaan	Express Entertainment
2017	Dastaar e Anaa	Riffat's mother	TV One
2017	Kab Mere Kehlaoge	Kulsoom	ARY Digital
2018	Ghar Damad	Begum	PTV
2018	Jaltay Khwab	Ubaida	Express Entertainment
2018	Bechari Nadia	Rahila	ARY Digital
2019	Qismat Ka Likha	Suriya	Express Entertainment
2019	Kam Zarf	Safia	Geo TV
2019	Mera Kiya Qasoor	Hania's mother-in-law	A-Plus
2020	Muhabbat Khel Tamasha	Tania's mother	TV One
2021	Jannat Chordi Meinay	Mariam's aunt	A-Plus
2021	Sirat-e-Mustaqeem	Asma	ARY Digital
2022	Naqqara-e-Khuda	Rahim's mother	TV One
2023	Muhabbat Ki Akhri Kahani	Bibi Jaan	Express Entertainment
2024	Babu ke Dulhaniyan	Chanda	PTV
2024	Barat Nahi Aaii	Zareena	Set Entertainment

=== Telefilm ===
Year	Title	Role
2019	Eid Loadshedding Mubarak	Mani's mother

=== Film ===
Year	Title	Role
2019	Mohra	Hameeda
2021	Tharki	Principle Sahiba
