= Dhol Bajnay Laga =

Pakistani TV drama

- Genre: Family drama; Serial drama; Romantic drama
- Written by: Nasir Abbas
- Directed by: Fahim Burney
- Starring: Resham; Azfar Rehman; Sohai Ali Abro; Javed Sheikh; Zarnish Khan; Asma Abbas; Arslan Asad Butt
- Theme music composer: Sohail Haider
- Opening theme: "Dhol Te Vaja De" by Mehwish Hayat
- Country of origin: Pakistan
- Original language: Urdu
- No. of seasons: 1
- No. of episodes: 30

Production
- Production locations: Muree; Nathiagali
- Camera setup: Multi-camera setup

Original release
- Network: Hum TV
- Release: 27 June – 28 July 2014

Dhol Bajnay Laga (Urdu: ڈھول بجنے لگا, lit. 'The Drumbeat Started') is a Pakistani Ramadan special television drama serial, written by Nasir Abbas, directed by Fahim Burney, and aired on Hum TV during 2014. It stars Resham, Azfar Rehman, Sohai Ali Abro and Javed Sheikh.

== Plot ==
The story begins with the romance of two paternal cousins, Sohai and Azfar, who live in their grandfather's house and wish to marry. Both lost their fathers during childhood and were raised by their respective mothers: Bushra, a Sialkot-raised Punjabi woman, and Sukoon, an Urdu-speaking and sophisticated woman. Bushra and Sukoon despise each other and have contrasting views on life. Their different cultural backgrounds also create hurdles in their children's love life. With the help of their grandmother, Sohai and Azfar devise a plan to get their mothers married first so they can live in peace after that. Meanwhile, the mothers are busy trying to arrange marriages for their children with partners who share their respective cultural backgrounds and select suitable suitors for them.

== Cast ==
- Resham as Parizaad
- Azfar Rehman as Azfar
- Sohai Ali Abro as Sohai
- Javed Sheikh as Shahrukh
- Asma Abbas as Bushra
- Nargis Rasheed as Sukoon
- Anjum Habibi as Asadullah
- Komal Naaz as Aalam Ara
- Arslan Asad Butt as Arslan
- Zarnish Khan as Zara

== Soundtrack ==
The original soundtrack of the serial was performed by Mehwish Hayat and the music was composed by Sohail Haider.

== See also ==
- List of programs broadcast by Hum TV
- 2016 in Pakistani television
