= Mohabbataan Sachiyaan =

2007 film

- Directed by: Shahzad Rafique
- Screenplay by: Mohammad Pervez Kalim
- Story by: Ayub Khawar
- Produced by: Shafqat Chaudhary & Khalil Rana
- Starring: Veena Malik; Babrik Shah; Adnan Khan; Maria Khan; Raheela Agha
- Cinematography: Muzzamil Shah
- Edited by: Mateen Qadus; Murad J. Siddiqi
- Music by: Wajahat Attre
- Production company: Sound View Production
- Distributed by: Geo Films
- Release date: 14 October 2007
- Country: Pakistan
- Language: Punjabi

Mohabbataan Sachiyaan is a 2007 Pakistani Punjabi-language musical romance film directed by Shehzad Rafiq and produced by Shafqat Chaudhary. The film was distributed by Geo Films in cinemas nationwide on October 14, 2007.

== Plot outline ==
The film is a love story highlighting the frustration and anguish of the younger generation affected by the forced decisions of their elders.

== Cast ==
- Veena Malik
- Adnan Khan
- Babrak Shah
- Salman Ashraf
- Rashid Mehmood
- Naghma
- Ali Ejaz
- Zahid Saleem
- Raheela Agha

== Soundtracks ==
The lyrics of song Mein Jeena Tere Naal was written by Riaz ur Rehman Saghar. The album was released by Geo Films in Pakistan. Film music score is by Wajahat Attre.

No.	Title	Singer(s)	Length
1.	"Ud Gayaan Nindraan Khalo Gayi"	Sonu Nigam, Shreya Ghoshal	7:09
2.	"Mein Jeena Tere Naal"	Shreya Ghoshal	5:26
3.	"Tere Bin Chain Naio Ownda"	Sonu Nigam, Shreya Ghoshal	3:56
4.	"Agli Tu Na Pichli Tu"	Sonu Nigam	3:45
5.	"Sajna Ve Pijhi Pijhi Rut Aagai"	Shreya Ghoshal	5:12
6.	"Keri Keri Shay Teri Akh Tuon Lukawaan"	Richa Sharma	5:55
7.	"Teriyan Yaadaan Owndiyan"	Sonu Nigam, Shreya Ghoshal
