= Aakhir Kab Tak =

Pakistani drama serial

- Urdu: آخر کب تک
- Genre: Social; Crime drama
- Written by: Radain Shah
- Directed by: Syed Ali Raza Usama
- Starring: Ushna Shah; Adeel Hussain; Srha Asghar; Haroon Shahid; Azfar Rehman
- Theme music composer: Syed Adeel Ali
- Opening theme: "Adhuri Hun Mein" by Alycia Dias and Ali Tariq
- Country of origin: Pakistan
- Original language: Urdu
- No. of episodes: 32

Production
- Executive producer: Momina Duraid
- Producer: Moomal Shunaid
- Production company: Moomal Productions

Original release
- Network: Hum TV
- Release: 16 May – 20 December 2021

Aakhir Kab Tak (transl. Until when?) is a Pakistani drama television series that aired weekly on Hum TV in 2021. Directed by Syed Ali Raza Usama, the series is produced by Moomal Shunaid under her banner production, Moomal Productions. It stars Ushna Shah, Srha Asghar, Javeria Abbasi, Adeel Hussain, Azfar Rehman and Haroon Shahid in the lead roles. Aakir Kab Tak revolves around the journey of women of a patriarchal household where they got their due after facing verbal, marital and sexual abuse.

The series earned critical acclaim due to its script, direction and performances, especially of Asghar's performance.

== Plot ==
Aakhir Kab Tak followed the story of two sisters, Noor and Fajar, living in a traditional household. Women here were not allowed to speak up for their rights and the girls, since childhood had seen their mother being abused by their father. Noor was strong and confident, whereas Fajar, the complete opposite. Seeing her mother being abused by her father and grandmother, along with being harassed by her uncle's son, who lived with them, influenced her personality.

The girls then joined a tuition centre where the teacher, Sir Zafar would sexually assault girls and make videos of them to blackmail them later. He raped Fajar and when she told Noor, her mother overheard, silencing Fajar and told her that nobody should learn what happened. This made Fajar more scared and soon, her mother arranged her marriage.

Luckily for Fajar, she married an angel, Saim. Despite Fajar’s breakdowns and unwillingness to warm up to him, he supported her and took the utmost care of her.

Meanwhile, the father became paralyzed, and Noor started taking care of the business. Although the others were unsupportive, she would go to the garage and manage everything. After the first order was sent out, the truck was stolen and Noor came across Nasir, a policeman and friend’s brother. Nasir fell in love with Noor, and upon realizing that she was not a typical girl, used hilarious tactics to win her over. He, despite coming from a wealthy family, was slightly corrupt and had mixed up morals.

Saim started taking Fajar to a therapist and after finding that out, her initially very accommodating mother-in-law was upset. She tried talking to Saim about getting remarried, but he would refuse, and after so much time Fajar started to trust this man. Something else which also happened was that Fajar and Noor’s mom finally started speaking up for herself and realized how thoroughly she enjoyed it.

Fajar’s mother-in-law then had her sent back, but she and Saim would keep meeting, as their relationship became stronger. One day, when Fajar was out with Saim and the mother was sitting in the dark in Fajar’s room, he came and did what he would thinking of it as Fajar. She was mad, and rightly so, and gave Bisaam a much needed thrashing. Noor, meanwhile, had gotten close to Nasir and told him about all of this so he had Bisam arrested.

Saim's mother lied to even make Saim once go against his wife. Fajar was devastated but Saim soon returned to his senses after a talk with Nasir, upon Noor's request. Noor also learned of Nasir’s unethical acts and was initially very upset but they soon made up. When Noor and Fajar's father was in the hospital, he prayed for him and vowed that if his uncle's condition improved, he would stop his unethical acts which happened. True to his word, Nasir changed.

Saim's mother partially realized her mistake and Fajar came back home and was finally ready for a physical relationship. Nasir proposed to Noor who was scared and hesitant since she was the breadwinner of the family and took care of everything. But things worked out and they were married. Fajar and Saim also started a new life and were happy together. Zafar, however was Saim's cousin and friend and came to live in their house.

He would blackmail Fajar and harassed her, but she stayed silent in the fear of losing Saim, who she truly loved. But after some time Noor found out and thrashed Zafar with a broom and told Fajar that if she did not tell Saim in two days, she would.

While Fajar tried to talk to Saim, she could not and killed herself. Meanwhile Zafar went into hiding. Despite Nasir's efforts, he would escape every time and was found when he surrendered himself, as per his lawyer’s instructions. A case was started, and first Zafar seemed to be winning since Fajar's case didn't have solid evidence. However, then Zafar's ex-wife, who was aware of Zafar's doings, spoke up in the court about finding Zafar's videos. Fajar also made a comeback and we found out that she had not actually died but gone into hiding. She testified that Zafar had done everything he had and another girl who Zafar had blackmailed, her phone was used as evidence. Bisaam, the cousin who had harassed Fajar, also told the truth,

Zafar was declared guilty, being charged with Rs. 50 lac as a fine and being put into prison for lifetime. Everyone was obviously overjoyed and Fajar's dadi realized her mistake and turned over a new leaf. Bisaam’s sister left to live in a hostel upon realizing what an animal her brother was.

We saw a new and confident Fajar giving a sensitization session to girls in a school about speaking about against sexual abuse, domestic abuse, and injustice. In the final scene, Noor addressed the girls watching, telling them that someone will always support them and staying quiet is never the answer.

== Cast ==
- Ushna Shah as Noor
- Srha Asghar as Fajar
- Adeel Hussain as Nasir
- Azfar Rehman as Zafar
- Haroon Shahid as Saim
- Javeria Abbasi as Safia
- Shahood Alvi as Ahtisham
- Erum Akhtar as Rihana
- Gul e Rana as Fareeda, Ahtisham and Toufik's mother
- Farah Nadeem as Nasir's mother
- Akhtar Hasnain as Toufik
- Sabahat Ali Bukhari as Neelofar, Saim's mother
- Raja Haider as Saim's father
- Nabeel bin Shahid as Bisam
- Sara Asim as Rukaiya, Ahtisham and Toufik's sister
- Anam Tanveer as Rubab, Fajar's lawyer
- Saad Azhar as Iftikhar, Zafar's lawyer
- Rubya Chaudhry as Aimen, Zafar's ex-wife
- Rashida Tabbasum as Bushra's mother
- Inaya Khan as Nimra, Saim's sister
- Zohaib Mirza as Sahir, Nasir's brother
- Umar Cheema as Imtiaz, Saim's colleague

== Production ==
Srha Asghar was chosen to portray the lead character in the series, marking her first lead role. According to her, she was asked to watch the series Freud and The Alienist as references.

== Reception ==
=== Critical reception ===
It received critical praise for gripping and bold storyline and execution of portrayal of pressure women faced in patriarchal society. Srha Asghar's performance as timid, anxiety-ridden and nervous college-going girl was especially praised. Towards the conclusion, series drew mixed reviews from audience and critics for overdramatic turns and stretching story.

=== Television rating points (TRPs) ===
First episode received 3.1 TRPs. Despite a bold storyline, the serial led the ratings slot another time with 5.7 TRPs An episode later, the drama led the ratings slot yet again with 5.5 TRPs Close to its end, Aakhir Kab Tak jumped to 7.1 TRPs leading the slot. The last episode of the serial proved to be its highest rated episode, in which it achieved TRPs of 7.8.
