= Arslan Asad Butt =

Pakistani actor (born 1992)

- Born: 30 October 1992 (age 33); Lahore, Pakistan
- Education: Beaconhouse National University
- Occupations: Actor, Model
- Years active: 2012–present
- Awards: Hum Award for Best Soap Actor

Arslan Asad Butt is a Pakistani actor and model. He is known for his roles in dramas Sara Sajeeda, Dil Diyan Gallan, Main Haar Nahi Manoun Gi, Bharam and Chupke Chupke. He is the recipient of Hum Award for Best Soap Actor for his performance in Naseebon Jali.

== Early life and education ==
Arslan was born on 30 October 1992 in Lahore, Pakistan to a Kashmiri Muslim family. He completed his studies from Beaconhouse National University.

== Career ==
He started modeling in 2012 and appeared in commercials. Arslan made his debut as an actor in drama Dhol Bajnay Laga as Jamil in 2014. He was noted for his roles in dramas Ghari Do Ghari, Ajnabi Lage Zindagi, Meri Baji and Korangi Ke Satrangi. Arslan also appeared in dramas Main Haar Nahi Manoun Gi, Naseebon Jali, Nalaiq and Aas. Since then he has appeared in dramas Sara Sajeeda, Haqeeqat, Bharam and Chupke Chupke. In 2018 he appeared in the movie Parwaaz Hai Junoon.

== Filmography ==
=== Television ===
Year	Title	Role	Network	Notes
2013	Living On The Edge	Himself	ARY Musik	Television debut
2014	Dhol Bajnay Laga	Jamil	Hum TV	Acting debut
2017	Ghari Do Ghari	Mazal	A-Plus	
2017	Naseebon Jali	Shazil	Hum TV	
2018	Main Haar Nahi Manoun Gi	Adil Hamdani	Hum TV	
2018	Meri Baji	Ahad	ARY Digital	
2018	Dil Diyan Gallan	Vicky	Hum TV	
2018	Mohabbat Karna Mana Hai	Qasim	BOL Entertainment	
2019	Ajnabi Lage Zindagi	Ahmar	LTN	
2019	Korangi Ke Satrangi	Rizwan	A-Plus	
2019	Bharam	Hammad Burhan	Hum TV	
2019	Aas	Rizwan	TV One	
2019	Sara Sajeeda	Fawaad Khan	TV3	Malaysian co-production
2019	Haqeeqat	Ahmed	A-Plus	
2020	Nalaiq	Arshan	Hum TV	
2021	Chupke Chupke	Ashar Amjad	Hum TV	
2021	Sila-e-Mohabbat	Ahmer	Hum TV	
2021	Ishq E Laa	Fahad	Hum TV	
2023	Meesni	Zaid	Hum TV	
2024	Tum Mere Kya Ho	Ahsan	Hum TV	
2024	Maya Naaz	Ashir	PTV	
2024	Mahi Da Armaan	Armaan	Set Entertainment	
2025	Laadli	Rohan	Hum TV	
2025	Shikanja	Arham	Geo TV	
2026	Mahi Da Armaan Part 2	Armaan	Set Entertainment	
2026	Hadd	Zarar	Hum TV	

=== Telefilm ===
Year	Title	Role
2025	Ghost Meri Dost	Arsalan

=== Film ===
Year	Title	Role
2018	Parwaaz Hai Junoon	Air Force student

== Awards and nominations ==
Year	Award	Category	Result	Tile	Ref.
2018	6th Hum Awards	Hum Award for Best Soap Actor	Won	Naseebon Jali	
