= Lamhay =

Pakistani television series

- Shaz Khan (left) and Zara Noor Abbas
- Genre: Romance; Drama
- Written by: Maimoona Khursheed
- Directed by: Amna Nawaz Khan; Sajid Kashmiri
- Starring: Zara Noor Abbas; Shaz Khan
- Country of origin: Pakistan
- Original language: Urdu
- No. of episodes: 22

Production
- Producer: Momina Duraid
- Production locations: Karachi, Sindh
- Camera setup: Multi-camera setup
- Production company: MD Productions

Original release
- Network: Hum TV
- Release: 28 August 2018 – 22 January 2019

Lamhay (Note: alternatively spelled as Lamhe.) (Urdu: لمحے, lit. 'Moments') is a Pakistani romantic drama television series, produced by Momina Duraid under her banner MD Productions. It premiered on Hum TV on 28 August 2018 replacing Tabeer. It stars Zara Noor Abbas and Shaz Khan in lead roles. The series got low ratings compared to Abbas's previous projects and ended after airing 22 episodes.

== Plot ==
Hashir Ali Shah's life changed dramatically when he was a child. His grandmother, Bi Jaan, arranged his marriage to Feroza, a woman given to settle a blood feud that led to his father's murder. To protect Hashir, Bi Jaan sent him to London.

Years later, Hashir returned to Karachi as a married man, leaving Bi Jaan heartbroken. She felt betrayed and sympathetic towards Feroza, who had sacrificed her life to end the animosity between their families.

To manage Hashir's household in the city, Aleena Riaz is hired. Bi Jaan goes from her haveli to Hashir's house in the city where she mistakes Aleena as Hashir's wife and Hashir doesn't correct her. His friend Naveed suggests that Aleena should pretend to be his wife, embodying eastern values to win Bi Jaan's heart. In this way, Bi Jaan will finally approve of his marriage to Rija, his London-based westernised second wife whom Bi Jaan will never accept. Aleena initially refuses but accepts due to her brother Basit's disability and the financial need to fund her niece's brain tumor treatment.

Aleena moves in with Hashir and tries to gain Bi Jaan's approval. However, Bi Jaan sets a condition: Aleena must help Hashir reconnect with Feroza. One night, a drunk Hashir frightens Aleena and she runs to Bi Jaan's room, arousing Bi Jaan's suspicions about her identity. Aleena reveals her contract with Hashir, and Bi Jaan persuads her to continue in the role, offering to help guide Hashir.

As Aleena navigates her complicated situation, Feroza arrives, and Aleena notices her interest in someone else. Bi Jaan grows suspicious of Aleena's motives. Meanwhile, Hashir argues with Rija, who demands a divorce. Aleena's past catches up with her when Qaiser, her sister-in-law Qaisera's ruffian brother, discovers her living with Hashir, threatening him and revealing her contract marriage.

Bi Jaan sent Hashir to the village to manage the haveli, where Feroza sought revenge against those who wronged her. However, her cousin Sher Afgan, the person whom she loved since het childhood, refused to support her, revealing his true intentions. Aleena's brother Basit and Qaisera confronted her about her contract marriage, advising her to maintain the status quo.

As tensions rose, Qaisera visited Bi Jaan, asking her to accept Aleena as her daughter-in-law. Bi Jaan refused, blaming Aleena for the situation.

Hashir becomes suspicious of Aleena's frequent meetings with Naveed, who's helping her arrest Qaiser. Hashir confesses his love, but Aleena rejects him, saying he's grown accustomed to her. She advises him to accept Feroza instead.

Hashir agrees to accept Feroza after an NGO worker intervenes. However, when Hashir, Aleena, and Bi Jaan visit the Haveli, they discover Feroza's true intentions. Bi Jaan feels betrayed and outraged.

During Bi Jaan's subsequent hospitalization, Rija returns from London and visits Bi Jaan, introducing herself as Hashir's friend. Rija hopes to reconcile with Hashir and asks him to end things with Aleena, but Hashir refuses.

Rija, determined to separate the couple, hires Qaiser to drive a wedge between them. Rija manipulates Bi Jaan by revealing Aleena's alleged prior marriage to Qaiser, leading Bi Jaan to expel Aleena from the house.

Aleena chooses not to defend herself and moves into a hostel. Hashir uncovers Qaiser and Rija's scheme and teams up with Naveed, and with police assistance, they rescue Basit and Aleena. As Hashir and Aleena reunite, Rija, enraged, attempts to shoot Hashir, but Aleena intervenes. Police arrive, and Rija and Qaiser are arrested.

Bi Jaan, witnessing the couple's devotion, finally believes in Hashir and Aleena's love.

== Cast ==
Actor(s)	Role
Shaz Khan	Hashir Ali Shah
Zara Noor Abbas	Aleena Riaz
Saba Faisal	Bi Jaan: Hashir's grand mother
Hira Hussain	Rija
Kaif Ghaznavi	Feroza
Mizna Waqas	Qaisera: Basit's wife
Saife Hassan	Basit: Aleena's brother
Hannan Sameed/ Salman Faisal	Naveed
Adeel Abbas	Qaiser
Usman Javed	Usman
Aliya Khan	Falak

== Production ==
In April 2018, Shaz Khan announced his upcoming project Lamhe, co-starring Zara Noor Abbas. Khan described his character as a person dealing with identity crisis and trying to find his eastern roots. Later, in July, Abbas revealed that the series would be a "twisted romance-drama" produced by Momina Duraid Productions. The show ultimately premiered on Hum TV in late August.

== Soundtrack ==
Lamhay - OST

Soundtrack album by Waqar Ali
- Released: 1 October 2018
- Recorded: 2018
- Genre: Television soundtrack
- Length: (1:51)
- Language: Urdu
- Label: Hum TV

Music video
- "Lamhay" OST on YouTube

The title song was sung by Waqar Ali, who also composed the music. The lyrics were written by Sabir Zafar.

== Critical reception ==
Although some critics lauded Abbas' portrayal of a vulnerable girl, praising her range and ability to bring depth to her character, The News International found that she "had nothing new to offer" in the series.
