= Baby (Pakistani TV series) =

Pakistani television series

- Genre: Drama; Romance; Soap opera
- Written by: Maimoona Sadaf
- Directed by: Muhammad Iftikhar Iffi
- Country of origin: Pakistan
- Original language: Urdu
- No. of episodes: 117

Production
- Producer: Zeeshan M. Khan
- Cinematography: Irfan Mirza
- Editors: Abdul Mannan Wai Qureshi; Muhammad Bilal Sheikh
- Camera setup: Multi-camera
- Running time: 38-42 minutes
- Production company: TNI Productions

Original release
- Network: Express Entertainment
- Release: 27 February – 18 August 2017

Baby (Urdu: بے بی; lit:Infant) is a Pakistani soap drama television series that aired from 27 February to 18 August 2017. It aired every Monday to Thursday 8:00pm PST. It revolves around Aliya, lovingly called "Baby" (Anzela Abbasi), who falls in love with a man from a rural area and belongs to a lower social class than her.

== Cast ==
- Anzela Abbasi as Aliya (Baby)
- Behroze Sabzwari as Aliya's father
- Sabahat Ali Bukhari as Shayan
- Asim Mehmood as Sarwae
- Raima Khan as Soni
- Arsalan Raja as Saleem
- Adnan Shah Tipu as Saarim
- Anushey Ali as Shaukat
- Sheeba Butt as Sughra
