= Anzela Abbasi =

Pakistani actress

- Born: 26 January 1998 (age 28); Karachi
- Occupations: Actress, Model, Singer
- Years active: 2012–present
- Parents: Shamoon Abbasi (father); Javeria Abbasi (mother)

Anzela Abbasi is a Pakistani actress turned model and singer who previously acted in Urdu Television, now singer/songwriter is venturing into the music industry with hits on Spotify. She is the daughter of actors Shamoon Abbasi and Javeria Abbasi and the paternal granddaughter of writer Zubair Abbasi. She first appeared on PTV in 2000 in the horror drama Canvas as a child star. Abbasi made her debut in acting by playing the leading lady in the serials Gila (2016), Baby (2017) and Main Haar Nahi Manoun Gi (2018).

== Personal life ==
Abbasi is the daughter of Pakistani actor Shamoon Abbasi and actress Javeria Abbasi.

== Filmography ==
=== Television ===
| Year | Title | Role | Notes |
|---|---|---|---|
| 2016 | Gila | Anzela | |
| 2017 | Baby | Aliya | |
| 2018 | Nibah | Saira | |
| 2018 | Laal Ishq | Rameen | Sequel to 2002 series Landa Bazar |
| 2018 | Main Haar Nahi Manoun Gi | Nimra | |
| 2020 | Haqeeqat | | Episode 5 |
