= Qismat Ka Likha =

Pakistani television series

- Written by: Salma Younus
- Directed by: Musawir Khan
- Starring: Zhalay Sarhadi; Aijaz Aslam
- Country of origin: Pakistan
- Original language: Urdu
- No. of seasons: 1
- No. of episodes: 100

Production
- Producer: Aijaz Aslam
- Camera setup: Multi-camera setup
- Running time: approx. 40 minutes
- Production companies: Ice Media and Entertainment

Original release
- Network: Express Entertainment
- Release: 12 September 2019 – 12 August 2020

Qismat Ka Likha (transl. The Written Destiny), previously titled Qismat, is a 2019 Pakistani family drama television series produced by Aijaz Aslam under Ice Media and Entertainment. It aired every Monday on Express Entertainment from September 2019 to August 2020.

== Cast ==
- Zhalay Sarhadi as Mehreen
- Aijaz Aslam as Obaid
- Jinaan Hussain as Laiba
- Rubina Arif as Suriya
- Laila Wasti as Aisha
- Sabahat Ali Bukhari as Nafisa (Aisha's mother)
- Sabiha Hashmi as Mehreen's mother
- Fahima Awan as Shaista
- Jinaan Hussain as Zari
- Maryam Tiwana as Hiba
- Faraz Farooqui as Hadi
- Zulqarnain Haider
