= Sultanat (2014 film) =

2014 film by Syed Faisal Bukhari

- Theatrical release poster
- Directed by: Syed Faisal Bukhari
- Screenplay by: Pervaiz Kaleem
- Produced by: Aslam Bhatti
- Starring: Ahsan Khan; Javeria Abbasi; Javed Sheikh; Shweta Tiwari; Raheela Agha
- Edited by: Ahmed Afridi
- Music by: Sajid Hussain
- Production company: A B Pictures
- Distributed by: 786 Media Works
- Release date: 29 July 2014
- Country: Pakistan
- Language: Urdu
- Box office: Rs. 3.15 crore (US$110,000)

Sultanat (Urdu: سلطنت; transl. Empire) is a 2014 Pakistani action romance film and 30-episode television series created and directed by Syed Faisal Bukhari, who had previously directed the top-grossing film Bhai Log, and produced by Aslam Bhatti, who also plays the lead role. The film has a multi-star cast including actors from the Indian television industry. It is said to be the most expensive film of Pakistani film industry, having a 22-crore budget. Pakistani writer Pervaiz Kaleem wrote the screenplay and dialogue. Ahmed Afridi is doing editing for this movie and he is handling post production sound designing and visual effects. It will be released as a film and later turned into a television series.

The film released on Eid al-Fitr, 2014. in cinemas across Pakistan.

== Cast ==
- Kashif Mehmood
- Deepak Shirke
- Akashdeep Saigal as Tabraiz
- Shweta Tiwari
- Chetan Hansraj as Javaid
- Zainab Qayyum as Zainab
- Ahsan khan
- Javeria Abbasi
- Nayyar Ejaz as Shafi
- Shabbir Jan
- Achint Kaur as Tara
- Mustafa Qureshi as Haji Baba
- Sila Hussein
- Govind Namdev as Gharo Dollor
- Haroon Ashraf
- Raheela Agha
- Ayub Khoso as Dumma
- David Firefly as David
- Aslam Bhatti as Aslam
- Umar Jadoon as himself (Special appearance in item song Sone Di Tawitri)
- Sara Loren as herself (Special appearance in item song Saiyaan)
- Afreen Khan as herself (Special appearance in item song Sone Di Tawitri)

=== Promotion ===
The film was promoted in Dubai.

=== Post-release ===
Sultanat was panned by critics across the country. Kamran Jawaid of Dawn named his review, "Movie Review: It doesn't get worse than Saltanat" and gave the film 1 out of 5 stars. Muhammad ShahZaib Siddiqui (@hellozaib) said on Twitter "Over all film is super duper but songs are too much vulgar so please don't watch it with family" Irteza Bhatti (@bhatti_rockstar) review on Twitter "well go nd watch it its super but dnt compare to Indian or any other nd give time to film its superb I love if nd watched twice". Jawaid claimed that it was probably the worst film in the history of cinema and that he had never seen people actually leave the cinema during a movie before this. His final words read, "Definitely not a good way to spend your Eid day – or any other day for that matter."

== See also ==
- List of highest-grossing Pakistani films
- List of Pakistani films of 2014
