= Moor (film) =

- Theatrical release poster
- مور
- Directed by: Jami
- Written by: Jami
- Produced by: Nazira Ali; Nadeem Mandviwalla; Jami
- Starring: Samiya Mumtaz; Hameed Sheikh; Shaz Khan; Ayaz Samoo; Nayyar Ejaz; Soniya Hussain; Eshita Mehboob Syed; Adnan Jaffar
- Cinematography: Farhan Hafeez
- Edited by: Rizwan AQ; Sourath Behan
- Music by: Strings
- Production companies: Azad Film Company; Mandviwalla Entertainment
- Distributed by: Geo Films
- Release dates: 14 August 2015 (Pakistan); 1 October 2015 (Busan)
- Running time: 134 minutes
- Country: Pakistan
- Languages: Urdu; Pashto
- Budget: Rs. 5 crore (US$180,000)
- Box office: Rs. 1.85 crore (US$66,000)

Moor (Pashto: مور, Urdu: ماں, meaning Mother) is a 2015 Pakistani drama film written and directed by Jami and co-produced by Nazira Ali, Nadeem Mandviwalla and Jami under the production banner of Azad Film Company and Mandviwalla Entertainment. The film stars Hameed Sheikh in lead along with Samiya Mumtaz, Shaz Khan, Nayyar Ejaz, Ayaz Samoo and Abdul Qadir in povital roles. The film's title, Moor, is a Pashto word meaning "Mother". Moor was previously named as Morqaye (maan sahiba). The film's story depicts the railway system of Balochistan, especially the closure of Zhob valley railways in 1984. Besides that the movie shows how families are run by the women. According to the director of the movie, the film depicts living through the problems faced by Pakistan.

The film was released nationwide by Mandviwalla Entertainment on 14 August 2015 coinciding with Pakistan Independence Day. It was selected to premiere at 20th Busan International Film Festival under the section "A Window on Asian Cinema". The film was selected as the Pakistani entry for the Best Foreign Language Film at the 88th Academy Awards but it was not nominated.

== Plot ==
Recently widowed, Wahidullah Khan (Hameed Sheikh) is a troubled station-master at the Khost railway station on the fractured Bostan-Zhob tracks. The station, his sole source of income, has been reduced to a pitiable ruin due to the prevalence of a mafia which has caused several rifts in the Baluchistan railways. Using a combination of incentives and coercion, it acquires the land on which the tracks and stations were situated – and builds commercial and residential developments there. Additionally, it sells the steel, removed from the tracks, for a fortune. Wahid is in a predicament; torn between a verbal agreement to sell the station and tracks under his care to the mafia – including his brother, Zahir (Shabbir Rana), and gang leader, Lalu (Sultan Hussain) – and the last wishes of his deceased wife, Palwasha (Samiya Mumtaz). She vehemently opposed the deal, based on a strong conviction that this land keeps her family rooted.

Meanwhile, Wahid's son, Ehsaanullah Khan (Shaz Khan), has set out to turn his fortunes in Karachi, Pakistan's troubled megacity, only with the memory of his mother's guidance to use time to his advantage. Yet the city, which appeared to be a sweet promise of success from a distance, is more unforgiving than Balochistan's treacherous landscape; here, time is at no one's mercy. Frustrated by his circumstances, Ehsaan chooses the more dishonourable trajectory to success, by getting involved in the corrupt, but highly lucrative, business of counterfeit documentation. He continues in the business even after his mother's death, and a scandal that almost exposes him in the film's opening sequences. He is, nonetheless, persistently haunted by his conscience and his mother's upright values of honour and loyalty to the land.

== Cast ==
- Hameed Sheikh as Wahid
- Shaz Khan as Ehsaanullah Khan
- Samiya Mumtaz as Palwasha
- Abdul Qadir as Baggoo Baba
- Shabbir Rana as Zahir
- Sultan Hussain as Lalu
- Ayaz Samoo as Imtisal
- Nayyar Ejaz as Talat
- Ali Shaikh as FIA Officer
- Sonya Hussyn as Amber
- Eshita Mehboob Syed as Arzo
- Joshinder Chaggar as Sarah
- Omar as Asghar
- Zain Ullah as Dilawar

== Production ==
=== Casting ===
Earlier, Shabbir Rana was chosen for lead role in film but was later opted out to give room to Hameed Sheikh who met the physical challenges of the role. Sheikh was selected after Jami was struck by his entry in the film Kandahar Break. For female lead Samiya Mumtaz was asked to do the role. Despite being a comedian in field, Ayaz Samoo was cast for villain's role in film. Abdul Qadir is senior most actor in cast hails from Quetta. On his role in the film he stated "I’m from a people who know how to live in the mountains, but I can't swim. But Jami was able to make me do it. My fellow actors proved that they are no less than any other in the country." Moreover, this will be the first film of Soniya Hussain and can be considered a second film for Eshita Mehboob Syed.

=== Filming ===
Moor is made at a budget of Rs. 5 crore (US$180,000). The film was shot in Quetta, Muslim Bagh, Khanozai, Shelabagh, Bostan, Hyderabad, Sukkur and Karachi. Making of Moor began in 2007 at a time when train issues were worse in Pakistan. To write the script, director and crew decided to travel to Balochistan by train. He summarized the conditions as "The 10-11 hour journey took us two days on a train that had no windows, no bathrooms and barely functioning lights. The engine broke down multiple times, and the diesel ran out just as many. And oh, we couldn’t stand near the door, because “rocket launcher kabhi bhi asakta hai”. We couldn't have anticipated the serious issues that we saw. Shooting in Muslimbagh had trials of its own. Not only was the weather inclement, but we encountered lack of support from security forces who would intervene to tell us it's not safe. Surprisingly, the Taliban cooperated and even emptied out their headquarters for us to shoot in. Our crew included girls wearing Western clothes, and nobody cared."

=== Marketing ===
The first look teaser was revealed online on 6 August 2013. The film release date was announced in a press conference held in Karachi where posters and theatrical trailer were also revealed. Film's final extended trailer was revealed on 7 July 2015 on official Facebook page. Final poster was revealed on 17 July.

== Soundtrack ==
Moor

Soundtrack album by Strings
- Released: 28 July 2015
- Genre: Feature film soundtrack
- Length: 43:33
- Label: Azad Film Company

Soundtrack of Moor is composed by the Pakistani band, Strings. Kothbiro by Ayub Ogada is featured in the trailer. The film bought the copyrights. Anwar Maqsood wrote the lyrics of songs. The soundtrack was released on 28 July 2015.

Track listing
No.	Title	Singer(s)	Length
1.	"Jogiya"	Javed Bashir	5:12
2.	"Eva"	Meesha Shafi	4:25
3.	"Talabgaar Hoon"	Javed Bashir	6:00
4.	"Tum Ho"	Strings	3:48
5.	"Gul Bashri"	Rahim Shah	4:13
6.	"Jeye Jeye Ja"	Rahma Ali, Noman Farooqi, Nisha Ali	5:21
7.	"Ku Ku Ku"	Strings	3:45

== Release ==
Moor was premiered in Karachi on 10 August and in Lahore on 13 August whereas film had its red carpet in Rawalpindi the next day. The film was released in cinemas across Pakistan on 14 August 2015 (Independence Day). The film premiered in Dubai on 29 October, while released in cinemas UAE the next day.

=== Home media ===
Moor was made available for streaming on Netflix.

== Reception ==
=== Box office ===
At box office, Moor collected Rs. 2.5 million (US$8,900) on its first day and opening weekend total collection was Rs. 6.21 million (US$22,000) The film had very low week days with collection of Rs. 8.58 million (US$31,000) in its first week. In its 2nd weekend film collected of Rs. 2.1 million (US$7,500) taking total box office collection to Rs. 1.07 crore (US$38,000).

=== Critical reception ===
The film was rated good overall by critics. Rafay Mahmood of The Express Tribune praised the film, rated it 4 out of 5 stars, and wrote: "Jami manages to pull off the impossible with Moor. He grants us a true Pakistani film sans being pretentious or preachy and makes the much rural and suburban concept of 'love for your motherland' moving for urban audiences." Adnan Murad of Blasting News rated it 3.5/5 stars and concluded: "A surprisingly engaging mix of reality and substance gives Moor a cult appeal that Pakistani film industry will always cherish. Moor has a swirl of allure and enchantment that sets it apart from other Pakistani films." Elizabeth Kerr of The Hollywood Reporter praised the film at the 20th Busan International Film Festival, calling it "A gorgeous and intensely contemporary slice of Pakistani life."

The News International critic Khusro Mumtaz found the film visually powerful but narratively incomplete, writing that "despite its length, one feels that there are whole chunks of story which are missing," specifically noting the "almost complete absence of any scenes between Ehsaan and his mother." He praised Hameed Sheikh's performance as "excellent," though he felt the film struck "a false note" in its climactic scene.

Dawn praised the film as a meeting of "parallel cinema and commercial cinema in Pakistan," highlighting the "excellent cinematography" by Farhan Hafeez and the "soundtrack to die for" by Strings. The review noted that while the film "may have taken its sweet time to reach the big screen," it "delivers a powerful message" and would "make a place for itself in the annals of world cinema by just being 'different'."

The Nation reported on the overwhelmingly positive audience response, noting that "the visuals were beyond captivating, and Baluchistan has never looked better." The review highlighted how the film "broke a lot of stereotypes" and "single-handedly raised the bar for Pakistani cinema."

The Express Tribune later named Moor the "Film of the Year" for 2015, stating that "Jami managed to pull off the seemingly impossible" and gave audiences "hope that Pakistani cinema will not be an extension of Bollywood."

== Accolades ==
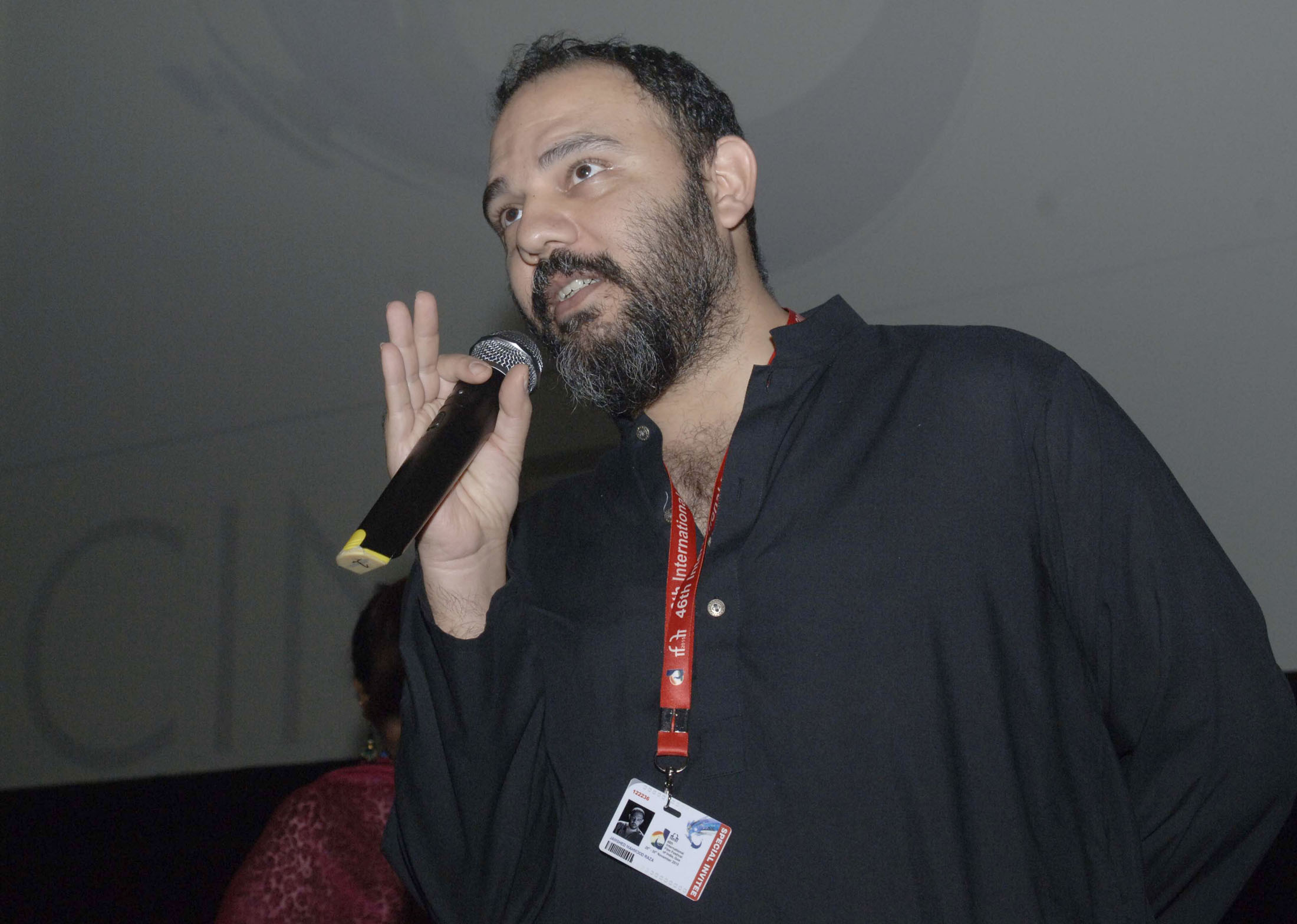
Director Jami at IFFI (2015)

Ceremony	Won	Nominated
15th Lux Style Awards	Azad Film Company – Best Film; Jami – Best Director	Hameed Sheikh – Best Actor; Samiya Mumtaz – Best Actress; Shaz Khan – Best Supporting Actor; Javed Bashir – Best Male Singer for "Talabgaar"; Rahim Shah – Best Male Singer for "Gul Bashri"; Meesha Shafi – Best Female Singer for "Eva"; Javed Bashir – Best Song of the Year for "Jogiya"
2nd ARY Film Awards	Ayaz Samoo – Best Actor in a Negative Role; Strings – Best Background Score; Farhan Hafeez – Best Cinematography; Tahir Moosa (Sharp Image) – Best Special Effects (Visual)	Azad Film Company – Best Film; Jami – Best Director; Hameed Sheikh – Best Actor; Soniya Hussain – Best Actress; Soniya Hussain – Best Star Debut Female
1st Indus Valley International Film Festival	Jami Mahmood – Best Film	

== See also ==
- List of Pakistani films of 2015
- List of submissions to the 88th Academy Awards for Best Foreign Language Film
- List of Pakistani submissions for the Academy Award for Best International Feature Film
