= Surkh Jorra =

- Genre: Romantic Drama; Family Drama; Serial Drama
- Written by: Uzma Kamran; Zafar Imran
- Directed by: Syed Muhammad Khurram; Fayaz Idrees
- Starring: Sonya Hussain; Azfar Rehman
- Theme music composer: MAD Music
- Country of origin: Pakistan
- Original language: Urdu
- No. of episodes: 25

Production
- Executive producers: Fayaz Idrees; Hum Sitaray
- Producer: Waqas Idrees
- Production locations: Karachi, Sindh, Pakistan
- Editors: Muhammad Bilal; Zain Khan
- Production company: Wide Angles Films

Original release
- Network: Hum Sitaray
- Release: 28 August – 12 October 2015

Surkh Jora (Urdu: سرخ جوڑا; lit: Red Dress) is a Pakistani romantic television serial first aired on 28 August 2015 on Hum Sitaray. The serial is produced by Fayyaz Idrees. Sonya Hussain and Azfar Rehman play the lead roles.

== Plot ==
It explores a story of love, devotion and deceit. The series highlights the life of Abiha (Sonya Hussain), a traditional girl with dreams of a good and simple life. People around her admire her, including Roman (Azfar Rehman) who meets her accidentally, and soon they get married with their families' consent. But soon, Abiha discovers Roman is nothing like what she had found him earlier. Behind his impressive personality lurks a male chauvinist who hates girls with progressive ideas. The series then shows Abiha's struggle to be able to change Roman.

== Cast ==
- Sonya Hussain as Zimmal / Abiha
- Azfar Rehman as Roman
- Laila Zuberi as Zakia
- Naila Jaffri as Sadia
- Irfan Khoosat Sarmad
- Tipu Sharif as Eshan
- Sabahat Ali Bukhari as Sobia
- Nadia Afgan as Sabiha
- Irfan Khoosat
- Hammad Farooqui
- Irsa Ghazal
- Munazzah Arif as Safia

== Soundtrack ==
The original soundtrack of Surkh Jorra is performed by Manzoor and Ayesha Ahmed, on the lyrics of Asim Raza, and the music was composed by Nijaat Ali.
