= Tarap (film) =

2006 film

- DVD Cover
- Directed by: Sangeeta
- Written by: Jaffar Arsh
- Produced by: Mohammad Yaseen Malik
- Starring: Resham; Saud; Sher Khan; Raheela Agha
- Cinematography: Faisal Bukhari
- Release date: October 23, 2006
- Running time: 135 minutes
- Country: Pakistan
- Language: Urdu

Tarap is a 2006 Pakistani Urdu film directed by Sangeeta. It was shot in Dubai and Lahore. It is known for its popular soundtrack.

== Cast ==
- Resham
- Saud
- Babrak Shah
- Nadeem
- Sheeba Bhakri
- Imran Urooj
- Raheela Agha
- Raja Haidar
- Sher Khan

== Release ==
The film was released on 24 October 2006, cociding with Eid al-Fitr.

== Soundtrack ==
The music is composed by Wajid Ali Nashad and the film song lyrics were by Ahmad Anees.

1. "Ishq Khana Kharab" - Babul Supriyo & Shreya Ghoshal (6:47)
2. "Teri Yaad" - Sadhana Sargam (5:44)
3. "Aap Say Tum Huai" - Alka Yagnik & Kumar Sanu (5:05)
4. "Mujhay Pyar Ka Nasha" - Shaan (6:14)
5. "Badal Do Badal Do" Sadhana Sargam & Shreya Ghoshal (5:42)
6. "Do Honthon Ki Piyas" - Alka Yagnik (5:49)
7. "Tun Hoon Main Janiaan" - Kumar Sanu & Shreya Ghoshal (5:15)
8. "Teri Yaad" - Kumar Sanu (5:44)
