= Sara Sajeeda =

2019 Pakistani television series

- Genre: Melodrama; Romance; Drama
- Directed by: Eoon Shuhaini; Feroz Kader; Rizwan Zaman
- Starring: Anmol Baloch; Tiz Zaqyah; Arslan Asad Butt
- Opening theme: Bicara Rasa - Ariff Bahran & Sarah Suhairi
- Ending theme: Menongkah Cinta - Erra Fazira
- Countries of origin: Malaysia; Pakistan
- Original languages: English; Malay; Urdu
- No. of episodes: 30

Production
- Producer: Fadzil Teh
- Production locations: Kuala Lumpur, Malaysia; Lahore, Pakistan
- Running time: 40 minutes
- Production company: Zeel Production

Original release
- Network: TV3
- Release: 3 October – 25 November 2019

Sara Sajeeda is a 2019 Malaysian-Pakistan television series co-directed by Eoon Shuhaini, Feroz Kader and Rizwan Zaman, starring Anmol Baloch, Tiz Zaqyah and Arslan Asad Butt. A Pakistani-Malaysian joint venture, it is produced by Malaysian-based Zeel Production. The show premiered on TV3 from 3 October 2019 and concluded on 25 November 2019.

The series is streaming online on YouTube.

== Plot ==
Sara (Tiz Zaqyah), a lecturer at a private college, is forced by her father to marry Megat (Fahrin Ahmad). However, their marriage ended after Sara severed the relationship by not being able to stand up to Megat's demeanor as her father did without her own consent.

Fawaad (Arslan Asad Butt), a young man from Pakistan, initially settled abroad returned to his family in Lahore. Soon after, he was offered to work as an engineer in Malaysia. Fawaad is stuck in the interests of his long-lost family or his career. In the end, he chose to start a new life in Kuala Lumpur.

Fawaad and Sara meet in an incident that has prompted Sara to get to know Fawaad more closely. They started liking each other and their marriage was fixed. Unfortunately before marriage, Fawaad was urgently flee to Pakistan after hearing the news of an earthquake that hit his family.

When Fawaad returned home, it turned out that his family was preparing for the wedding. He feels helpless. Despite initially refusing, Fawaad accepts the decision of his mother, Saima and regrets the fate of Sajeeda (Anmol Baloch) who has lost both of her parents in a landslide and earthquake. Upon returning to Malaysia, Fawaad began to split when Sara confessed that she had fallen in love with Fawaad while he had married Sajeeda without love.

== Cast ==
=== Main ===
- Anmol Baloch as Sajeeda
- Tiz Zaqyah as Sara
- Arslan Asad Butt as Fawaad Khan

=== Recurring ===
- Fahrin Ahmad as Megat
- Hareb Farooq as Mikaal
- Alif Muhaimin as Khalif
- Saima Saleem as Saima
- Raheela Agha as Reema
- Fouziah Gous as Nelisa
- Alizeh Shah as Jasmin
- Shaharuddin Thamby as Tan Sri Ismadi
- Mas Anizan as Puan Sri Norizan
- Zoya Khan as Asha
- Uyaina Arshad as Iman Dahlia
- Aliha Chaudry as Mehwar
- Aneela Agha as Sakinah
- Khalid Saleem Butt as Sheroz Khan
- Rohi Khan as Sarwat
- Ajmal Shezad as Malek Rahman
- Sofia Ibrahim as Tok Nani
- Ali Reza Kavoosi as Salam
- Jasper Supayah as Rita
- Shasha Abedul as Emelda
- Sachal Afzal as Aslam

=== Cameo appearance ===
- Mira Filzah as Sofea
- Amri Aziz as Remy
