= Raheela Agha =

Pakistani actress

- Born: 1964 (age 61–62); Lahore, Pakistan
- Education: University of Lahore
- Occupation: Actress
- Years active: 1970s – present
- Spouse: Asad Butt (husband)
- Children: Zeeshan Butt (son)

Raheela Agha is a Pakistani actress. She is known for her roles in dramas Meherbaan, Ghughi, Sara Sajeeda and Naagin.

== Early life ==
Raheela was born in 1964 in Lahore, Pakistan. She completed her studies from University of Lahore.

== Career ==
She made her debut on PTV in 1970s. She was noted for her roles in dramas Hulla Ray, Ek Sitam Aur Sahi, Piya Be Dardi, Jaan Nisar and Kaun Karta Hai Wafa. She also appeared in dramas Mil Ke Bhi Hum Na Mile, Kaise Huaye Benaam, Kitna Satatay Ho, Ishq Ibadat and Tum Mere Kya Ho and she also appeared movies Mohabbataan Sachiyaan, Tarap, Basanti, Gulabo and Lado Rani. She appeared in Urdu, Pashto and Punjabi movies and dramas. Since then she appeared in dramas Ali Ki Ammi, Meherbaan, Maana Ka Gharana, Ghughi, Sara Sajeeda and Naagin.

== Personal life ==
Raheela was married to producer Asad Butt who died. They had three children a son named Zeeshan Butt and a daughter.

== Filmography ==
=== Television ===
Year	Title	Role	Network
2011	Hulla Ray	Qayyum	TV One
2012	Zindagi Hath Barha	Ammi Jan	PTV
2012	Mere Huzoor	Chanda's mother	Express Entertainment
2012	Mil Ke Bhi Hum Na Mile	Yasmin's mother	Geo TV
2014	Ek Sitam Aur Sahi	Kulsoom	Express Entertainment
2015	Yeh Chahtein Yeh Ranjishein	Shagufta	PTV
2015	Kaise Huaye Benaam	Shehryar's mother	Geo TV
2015	Kitna Satatay Ho	Nuzhat	Hum TV
2015	Ishq Ibadat	Khala Jan	Hum TV
2015	Rung	Amma Jan	Hum Sitaray
2015	Tum Mere Kya Ho	Nunhi	PTV
2015	Maana Ka Gharana	Saleha	Hum TV
2015	Ali Ki Ammi	Bibi	Geo Entertainment
2015–16	Aangan Mein Deewar	Khadija	PTV Home
2016	Piya Be Dardi	Suriya	A-Plus
2016	Jaan Nisar	Bibi Jan	A-Plus
2016	Kaun Karta Hai Wafa	Tahira	A-Plus
2017	Ghari Do Ghari	Jahan Ara	A-Plus
2017	Baby	Bibi Ji	Express Entertainment
2017	Meherbaan	Nasreen	A-Plus
2017	Dil-e-Bekhabar	Sultani	A-Plus
2018	Dukh Kam Na Honge	Yasir's mother	A-Plus
2018	Ghughi	Sajid's wife	TV One
2019	Naagin	Sanam Jahan	Geo Kahani
2019	Sara Sajeeda	Reema	TV3
2019	Uraan	Shaista	A-Plus
2019	Mujhe Rang De	Sani Begum	LTN
2021	Thora Sa Pyar	Ami Jan	SAB TV
2021	Dil Na Umeed To Nahi	Malkani Ji	TV One
2021	Dil Lattu Ho Gaya	Tahmana	SAB TV
2021	Tum Sath Nibha Letay Agar	Ibraah's mother	LTN
2021	Ruswaiyaan	Rimal's mother	SAB TV
2021	Thora Sa Pyar	Rabia's mother	SAB TV
2022	Raqs-e-Tamanna	Noor Bano's grandmother	SAB TV
2023	Tashreef Laeay	Farzana	PTV
2024	Ek Teri Chahat Ke Baad	Majida	Aur Life
2024	Faraar	Malkani	Green Entertainment
2024	Mahi Da Armaan	Bahar Begum	Set Entertainment
2025	Chilli & Saas	Nazeen	PTV
2025	Arsh	Rupa	Express Entertainment
2026	Mahi Da Armaan Part 2	Bahar Begum	Set Entertainment

=== Web series ===
Year	Title	Role	Network
2022	Ladkiyon Wala Ghar	Malika	Kabaarr Khaana

=== Film ===
Year	Film	Language
1987	Meri Awaz	Urdu
1989	Ik Jan Hayn Ham	Urdu
1989	Aag Aur Suhag	Urdu
1990	Barood Ka Tohfa	Urdu / Pashto
1991	Super Power	Punjabi
2001	Humayun Gujjar	Punjabi
2002	Ghazi Ilmuddin Shaheed	Urdu
2002	Budha Sher	Punjabi
2002	Achhoo Sheedi	Punjabi
2003	Amanat	Pashto
2004	Bhola Sajjan	Punjabi
2004	Pardesi Aye Watna Nu	Punjabi
2005	Sher-e-Azam	Punjabi
2005	Ziddi Rajput	Punjabi
2005	Bau Badmash	Punjabi
2006	Butt Badshah	Punjabi
2006	Tarap	Urdu
2006	Qaidi Yaar	Punjabi
2007	Puttar Humayun Gujjar Da	Punjabi
2007	Mohabbataan Sachiyaan	Punjabi
2007	Potra Shahiye Da	Punjabi
2008	Basanti	Punjabi
2008	Gulabo	Punjabi
2009	Allah Uttay Dorian	Punjabi
2010	Jaal	Pashto
2010	Wohti Lay Kay Jani A	Punjabi
2010	Lado Rani	Punjabi
2012	Dil Dian Lagian	Punjabi
2013	Super Girl	Urdu
2013	Ghairat	Pashto
2013	Ziddi Pakhtun	Pashto
2014	Lafanga	Punjabi
2014	Jan Tun Pyara	Punjabi
2014	Dastan	Pashto
2014	Zwe Da Badamala	Pashto
2014	I Miss You	Pashto
2014	Eho Kurri Leni A	Punjabi
2014	Killer	Urdu
2014	Sultanat	Urdu
2015	Devdas	Urdu
2015	Kasak	Urdu
2015	Badnam	Pashto
2016	Lewany Pukhtoon	Pashto
2016	Jashan	Pashto
2016	Mohabbat Kar Da Lewano De	Pashto
2016	Raja	Pashto
2017	Shor Sharaba	Urdu
2017	Ishq Wala Love	Urdu
2017	Azad Badshah	Punjabi
2018	Ishq Di Jang	Punjabi
2018	Ziddi O Badmash	Pashto
2018	Raqeebano La Darshan	Pashto
2018	Da Gandagir-o-Gandagir	Pashto
2018	Da Badamlo Badamala	Pashto
2019	Sharikay Di Agg	Punjabi
2020	Roundabout	Urdu
2022	Chu Lay Aasman	Urdu
2022	The Legend of Maula Jatt	Punjabi
2022	Tich Button	Urdu
2023	Basheera Gujjar	Punjabi
2023	Babra Gujjar	Punjabi
2023	Laday Da Viyah	Punjabi
2024	Chu Lay Aasman	Urdu
