= Jamshed Mahmood Raza =

Pakistani film producer

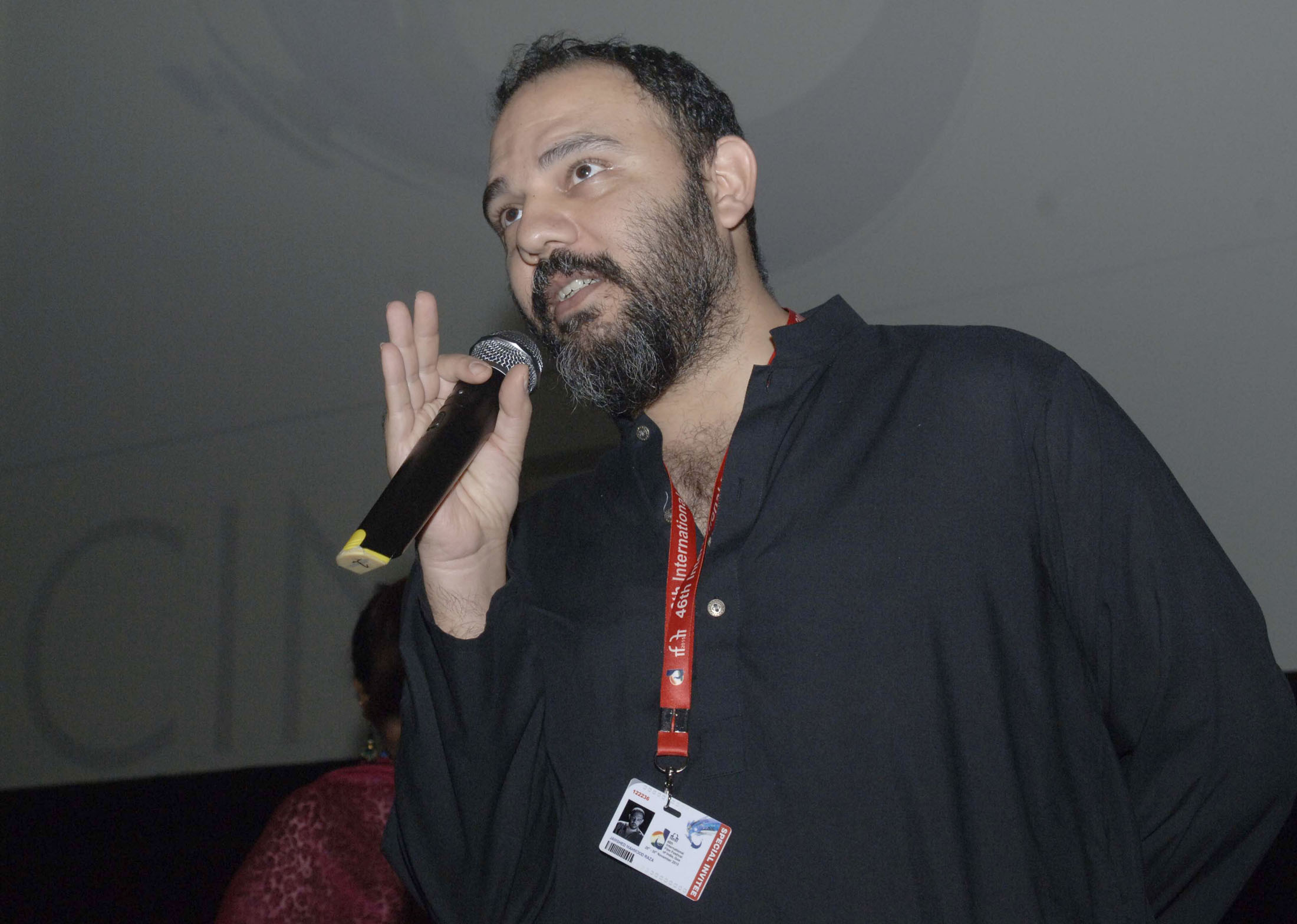
- Jami at IFFI (2015)
- Born: 7 March 1972 (age 54)
- Occupations: Film producer, writer, director
- Notable work: Moor (2015)

Jamshed Mahmood Raza better known as Jami (born 7 March 1972) is a Pakistani film producer, writer and director.

== Filmography ==
Year	Film	Director	Producer	Writer	Notes	Ref(s)
2014	O21 (film)	Yes	No	Yes		
2014	Downward Dog	Yes				
2015	Moor	Yes	Yes	Yes		
2017	Iss Baar Milo	Yes	-	-	music video	

== Awards ==
- TFL (TorinoFilmLab) award at the Locarno International Film Festival (2017)

=== Lux Style Awards ===
Ceremony	Category	Project	Result
1st Lux Style Awards	Best Fashion Photographer	N/A	Nominated
1st Lux Style Awards	Best Video Director	N/A	Nominated
2nd Lux Style Awards	Best Video Director	Anjaaney	Won
3rd Lux Style Awards	Best Video Director	Chaaye Chaaye	Nominated
3rd Lux Style Awards	Best Video Director	Akhiyan	Nominated
4th Lux Style Awards	Best Video Director	Chal Dil Mere	Nominated
4th Lux Style Awards	Best Video Director	Dhaani	Nominated
8th Lux Style Awards	Best Video Director	Jaago	Nominated
14th Lux Style Awards	Best Film Director	O21	Nominated
15th Lux Style Awards	Best Film Director	Moor	Won
15th Lux Style Awards	Best Film	Moor	Won

Jami famously dumped all his LSAs in the street in the wake of Me Too movement, after jury denied to revoke Ali Zafar's nominations at 18th Lux Style Awards. Previously many women had come forward with harassment allegations against Ali.

== Controversies ==
In 2018, he faces controversy over his upcoming production "Jugnu." Student Ahmad Baig from the National College of Arts (NCA) alleges that Jami copied the idea from his 2016 film, "Ibbo Ki Eid." Baig claims similarities and posts a side-by-side comparison. Jami refutes the allegations, asserting that research for "Jugnu" began in 2014, predating Baig's work. He emphasizes the personal nature of "Jugnu" and questions the existence of Baig's film online.

In October 2019, Jami accused Hameed Haroon, CEO of Dawn, of rape. Jami took to Twitter, naming Haroon and stating that he was ready to share his story. In response, Haroon filed a defamation case against Jami, denying the allegations and claiming the story was fabricated to silence him.
