= Be Aitbaar =

Pakistani television series

- Genre: Family drama; Serial drama; Romantic drama
- Written by: Malik Khuda Buksh
- Directed by: Shah Hussain
- Starring: Saba Faisal; Javed Sheikh; Behroze Sabzwari; Zaryan Hassan; Salman Faisal; Mariam Tiwana; Kanwar Arsalan
- Country of origin: Pakistan
- Original language: Urdu
- No. of seasons: 1
- No. of episodes: 78

Production
- Producers: Syed Mukhtar Ahmed; Momina Duraid
- Camera setup: Multi-camera setup
- Production companies: Gold Bridge Media; MD Productions

Original release
- Network: Hum TV
- Release: 11 July – 7 December 2016

Be Aitbaar (Urdu: بے اعتبار; lit:Discredit) was a Pakistani drama series that began airing on 11 July 2016 on Hum TV and ended on 7 December 2016. It is written by Malik Khuda Baksh and directed by Shah Hussain. It stars Saba Faisal, Javed Sheikh, Kanwar Arsalan and Behroze Sabzwari.

== Plot ==
The story begins with Uzma (Saba Faisal) visiting her cousin Jameel (Javed Sheikh) who is suffering from cancer. A flashback is shown revealing Uzma was raped in a train journey and becomes pregnant. Uzma's wedding was arranged with Jameel but he rejects her after this incident. Uzma and her son Salman (Zaryan Hassan) are accepted by Abdul Qadir, and later gives birth to a daughter Mahzeb (Maryam Tinwari). Jameel also got married and has a daughter Kamla. Jameel apologises to Uzma and later dies. Kamla, now an orphan girl moves to Uzma's house. Salman is attracted to Kamla at first sight.

Asad (Kanwar Arsalan) runs a clothes shop. A customer (Fiza) is crazy about him but he does not share these feelings. Asad has a brother, Azaan (Salman Faisal), and his parents are Shagufta (Birjees Farooqui) and Kamal (Hashim Butt). Azaan and Mahzeb are deeply in love with each other. But his mother disapproves and would like her sons to marry in a high class.

After Asad saves Kamla from goons they fall in love and get engaged. Before the wedding Salman and Asad engage in a fight, resulting in Asad accidentally getting shot.

Another story starts from Asif (Behroze Sabzwari), introducing himself as Mahzeb's office teacher and uncle of Asad's fiancée Fiza (Shanzey Ali). Asif has a wife, Nausheen (Sabahat Bukhari), aunt of Zara (Sehra Asghar). Asif has a son, Sahir (Saqlain Bashir). Sahir has loved Kamla and goes to Kamla's home to propose her. Asif starts loving Kamla and marries her.

== Cast ==
- Javed Sheikh as Jameel (Dead)
- Saba Faisal as Uzma
- Kanwar Arsalan as Asad (Dead)
- Behroze Sabzwari as Asif
- Sabahat Ali Bukhari as Nausheen Begum
- Hashim Butt as Kamal
- Birjees Farooqui as Shagufta
- Sehrish Fatima as Kamla
- Saqlain Bashir as Sahir
- Marium Tinwari as Mahzeb
- Hasaan Khan as Salman
- Salman Faisal as Azaan
- Shanzey Ali as Fiza
- Sehra Asghar as Zara

== See also ==
- List of programs broadcast by Hum TV
- 2016 in Pakistani television
