= Syed Faisal Bukhari =

Film director

- سید فیصل بخاری
- Born: Lahore, Pakistan
- Occupations: Director, actor, cinematographer
- Years active: 2011–present
- Notable work: Bhai Log; Sultanat; Blind Love; Rani (2017 TV series)
- Mother: Zubaida Khanum

Syed Faisal Bukhari is a Pakistani film and television director, actor and cinematographer. He is best known for directing the drama serial Rani (2017 TV series).

== Personal life ==
He is the son of the late Pakistani playback singer Zubaida Khanum and the late film cameraman Syed Riaz Bukhari.

== Career ==
=== Television ===
Year	Serial	Channel
2005-06	Barson Baad	PTV
2017	Rani	Geo Entertainment
2022	Woh Pagal Si	ARY Digital
2023	Ehsaan Faramosh	ARY Digital
2024	Khudsar	ARY Digital
2024	Return of Nastoor	SAB TV

=== Films ===
Year	Film	Language
2011	Bhai Log	Urdu
2014	Sultanat	Urdu
2016	Blind Love	Urdu
2026	Luv Di Saun	Urdu
