= Javeria Abbasi =

Pakistani actress and model

- Born: 1973 (age 52–53); Karachi, Sindh, Pakistan
- Occupations: Actress, Model, Host
- Years active: 1996–present
- Spouse: Shamoon Abbasi (m. 1997; div. 2009) Adeel Haider (m. 2024)
- Relatives: Anzela Abbasi (daughter)

Javeria Abbasi (Urdu: جویریہ عباسی) is a Pakistani film and television actress, model and host. She has appeared in the Hum TV serials Dil, Diya, Dehleez (in a lead role) and Thori Si Khushiyan as well as Doraha, Andata, Sotayli, Tere Liye; the ARY Digital serials "Darmiyan" Phool Wali Gali and Phir Kho Jayye Na; and PTV serials Maamta, Kash Mein Teri Beti Na Hoti and Chahatain. She made her film debut in the 2011 Pakistani film, Saltanat.

Javeria has a daughter, Anzela, with her first spouse Shamoon Abbasi. Javeria and Shamoon divorced in 2009, and Anzela lived afterwards with her mother. In 2023, Javeria arranged her daughter’s wedding. A year later Javeria married entrepreneur Adeel Haider.

== Awards and nominations ==
Ceremony	Category	Project	Result
7th Lux Style Awards	Best Television Actress (Satellite)	Najia	Nominated
7th Lux Style Awards	Best Television Actress (Terrestrial)	Sukhan	Nominated

== Television ==
Year	Title	Role	Channel	Notes	Ref
2004	Ana	Nazea Shaad Ansari	ARY Digital		
2006	Kathputli		PTV		
2006	Dil, Diya, Dehleez	Zaitoon Bano/ Mutarba	Hum TV		
2008	Doraha	Sofia	Geo Entertainment		
2015	Bay Qasoor		ARY Digital		
2016	Bad Gumaan	Sabahat	Hum TV		
2017	Hari Hari Churiyaan	Sheeza	Geo TV		
2018	Haara Dil		A-Plus TV		
2018	Babban Khala Ki Betiyann	Musarat aka Mommi	ARY Digital		
2020	Tamanna	Sabiha	Geo TV		
2020	Ghisi Piti Mohabbat	Amtul	ARY Digital		
2020	Raqs e Bismil	Sakina's mother	Hum TV		
2021	Shehnai	Munni	ARY Digital		
2021	Tanaa Banaa	Fauzia	Hum TV	Ramadan Special	
2021	Aakhir Kab Tak	Safia	Hum TV		
2022	Dil Awaiz	Roshan Ara	Geo TV		
2024	Mehroom	Nasreen	Geo Entertainment		
2025	Meri Zindagi Hai Tu	Beenish Irfan	ARY Digital		
