= 7th Hum Awards =

2019 Pakistani entertainment awards

- Date: 5 October 2019
- Site: NRG Arena, Houston, USA
- Hosted by: Ali Rehman Khan, Mikaal Zulfiqar Sanam Jung, Ayesha Omar, Bushra Ansari, and Ahmad Ali Butt
- Produced by: Hum Network

Highlights
- Best Drama Serial (Jury): Dar Si Jaati Hai Sila
- Best Drama Serial (Popular): Suno Chanda
- Most awards: Suno Chanda (10)

Television coverage
- Channel: Hum TV
- Network: Hum

The 7th Hum Awards by Hum Network Limited, honored the best in fashion, music, and Hum Television Dramas of 2018. It took place on 5 October 2019, at the NRG Arena in Houston, Texas, United States at 7:30 p.m (CST). This award were given in 27 categories. The ceremony was televised in Pakistan by Hum TV.

== Winners and nominees ==
On 21 August 2019, the nominees for the five viewers' choice categories were announced through the Hum Network website, which was followed by a period of public voting.

Winners are listed first and highlighted in boldface.

Jury Choice Awards
**Best Drama Serial**: **Dar Si Jaati Hai Sila**; Suno Chanda; Ishq Tamasha; Tabeer; Baandi; Belapur Ki Dayan
**Best Director Drama Serial**: **Kashif Nisar – Dar Si Jati Hai Sila**; Danish Nawaz – Ishq Tamasha; Aehsun Talish – Suno Chanda; Saife Hassan – Belepur ki Dayan; Aehsan Talish – Taabeer; Ahmed Kamran – Baandi	**Best Writer Drama Serial**: **Bee Gul – Dar Si Jati Hai Sila**; **Saima Akram Chaudhry – Suno Chanda**; Misbah Nausheen – Ishq Tamasha; Inam Hasan – Belapur ki Dayan; Imran Ashraf – Tabeer; Asma Nabeel – Baandi
**Best Actor**: **Nauman Ijaz – Dar Si Jati Hai Sila**; Junaid Khan – Ishq Tamasha; Farhan Saeed – Suno Chanda; Adnan Siddiqui – Belapur ki Dayan; Shahzad Sheikh – Tabeer; Muneeb Butt – Baandi	**Best Actress**: **Yumna Zaidi – Dar Si Jati Hai Sila**; Aiman Khan – Ishq Tamasha; Iqra Aziz – Suno Chanda; Sarah Khan – Belapur ki Dayan; Iqra Aziz – Tabeer; Aiman Khan – Baandi
**Best Supporting Actor**: **Yasir Hussain – Baandi**; **Adnan Tipu Shah – Suno Chanda**; Osama Tahir – Dar Si Jati Hai Sila; Faizan Khawaja – Ishq Tamasha; Osama Tahir – Belapur ki Dayan	**Best Supporting Actress**: **Nadia Afgan – Suno Chanda**; Saman Ansari – Dar Si Jati Hai Sila; Kinza Hashmi – Ishq Tamasha; Sakina Samo – Dar Si Jati Hai Sila; Hajra Yamin – Baandi
**Best Television Sensation Male**: **Osama Tahir – Dar Si Jati Hai Sila**	**Best Television Sensation Female**: **Alizeh Shah – Ishq Tamasha**
**Most Impactful Character**: **Noman Ijaz – Dar Si Jati Hai Sila**; Sakina Samo – Dar Si Jati Hai Sila; Nadia Afgan – Suno Chanda; Hina Dilpazeer – Baandi	**Best Actor in a Negative Role**: **Noman Ijaz – Dar Si Jati Hai Sila**; Kinza Hashmi – Ishq Tamasha; Amar Khan – Belapur ki Dayan; Yasir Hussain – Baandi
**Best Onscreen Couple**: **Farhan Saeed & Iqra Aziz – Suno Chanda**; Osama Tahir & Yumna Zaidi – Dar Si Jati Hai Sila; Junaid Khan & Aiman Khan – Ishq Tamasha; Shahzad Sheikh & Iqra Aziz – Tabeer; Muneeb Butt & Aiman Khan – Baandi	**Best Television Film**: **Is Dil ki Aisi ki Taisi**
**Best Soap Series**: **Sanwari**
**Best Soap Actor**: **Osama Khan – Sanwari**	**Best Soap Actress**: **Zainab Ahmed – Maa Sadqay**
**Kashmir Golden Plate Award**: **Dr. Sultana Siddiqui**	**Life Time Achievement Award**: **Alamgir**
**Recognition Awards**: **Film – Parwaz Hai Junoon**; **Actor Film – Hamza Ali Abbasi**; **Actress Film – Hania Amir**; **Best Child Artist – Sami Khan for Suno Chanda**
Viewers Choice Awards
**Best Drama Serial Popular**: **Suno Chanda**; Dar Si Jati Hai Sila; Ishq Tamasha; Tabeer; Baandi; Belapur Ki Dayan
**Best Actor Male Popular**: **Farhan Saeed – Suno Chanda**; Noman Ijaz – Dar Si Jati Hai Sila; Junaid Khan – Ishq Tamasha; Adnan Siddiqui – Belapur Ki Dayan; Shahzad Sheikh – Tabeer; Muneeb Butt – Baandi	**Best Actor Female Popular**: **Iqra Aziz – Suno Chanda**; Yumna Zaidi – Dar Si Jati Hai Sila; Aiman Khan – Ishq Tamasha; Sarah Khan – Belapur Ki Dayan; Iqra Aziz – Tabeer; Aiman Khan – Baandi
**Best Onscreen Couple Popular**: **Farhan Saeed & Iqra Aziz – Suno Chanda**; Osama Tahir & Yumna Zaidi – Dar Si Jati Hai Sila; Junaid Khan & Aiman Khan – Ishq Tamasha; Shahzad Sheikh & Iqra Aziz – Tabeer; Muneeb Butt & Aiman Khan – Baandi	**Best Original Soundtrack Popular**: **"Main Akeli Kiun" for Baandi – Sahir Ali Bagga & Momina Duraid Productions**
