= Iqra Aziz =

Pakistani actress (born 1997)

- اقرا عزیز
- Born: 24 November 1997 (age 28); Karachi, Sindh, Pakistan
- Occupation: Actress
- Years active: 2014–present
- Spouse: Yasir Hussain (m. 2019)
- Children: 2

Iqra Aziz Hussain (née Aziz; born November 24, 1997) is a Pakistani actress who works in Urdu television. One of Pakistan's highest-paid actresses, Known for her portrayals of socially-independent woman in the media. Her accolades include four Hum Awards and three Lux Style Awards.

Aziz began her acting career in 2014 with an ensemble drama Kissey Apna Kahein followed by Muqaddas and Mol (both 2015). These performances earned her the Hum Award for Best Television Sensation. Subsequently, she has starred in shows including, the comedy drama Choti Si Zindagi (2016), the romance–dramas Qurban (2018) and Khuda Aur Muhabbat 3 (2021) and established herself with the social dramas Ranjha Ranjha Kardi (2018) and Raqeeb Se (2021) which earned her critical acclaim and Lux Style Award for Best Actress Critics.

For her portrayal as a girl against marriage in the comedy drama Suno Chanda (2018) and Suno Chanda 2 (2019) she won the Hum Award for Best Actress Popular and Lux Style Award for Best Actress Critics and Popular. This success was followed by a brief hiatus and two poorly-received dramas Mannat Murad (2023) and Burns Road Kay Romeo Juliet (2024). In addition to acting, she serves as the ambassador of several brands and products. Aziz his married to actor and writer Yasir Hussain, with whom she has two children.

== Early life and family ==
Aziz was born on 24 November 1997 in Karachi. She mentioned in interviews about her mother's struggles being a single parent. Iqra finished college while working but eventually left her studies to focus on acting. In 2018, she talked about her plans to resume education in the next couple of years.

== Career ==
=== Early work (2014–2017) ===
Aziz started her career when she was 14. She dabbled into acting with the help of her elder sister. She first auditioned as a television commercial model and was picked by Talent agency Citrus. Aziz continues to appear in television commercials till date. Later she was noticed by Hum TV's co-producer Momina Duraid who offered her a role in her series Kissey Apna Kahein. She acted along with Arij Fatyma, Danish Taimoor, Shabbir Jan and other senior actors in the series.

She followed her acting career with a leading role in another Hum TV drama series Muqaddas, an adaptation of Adeel Razzak's novel of the same name. The series proved to be the breakthrough for her and she received Hum Award for Best Television Sensation female. The series also received mix reviews and was nominated for Best Television Play at annual Lux Style Awards. In the same year she appeared as a parallel lead in Ilyas Kashmiri's directorial Mol.

In 2016, she was seen in a leading role in Socha Na Tha and Deewana. In the latter, she played the character of Mehar Sultana (Mehru) who befriends the mischievous but loving Jinn Falak (Shehroz Sabzwari) and eventually falls in love with him. Aziz subsequently did a supporting role of Marina Zaman in Ahmed Bhatti's directorial Kisay Chahoon and a parallel lead role of Mannat Chaudhary in Laaj. Her on-screen chemistry with Shehzad Sheikh in Choti Si Zindagi was praised and both received a nomination for Best Onscreen Couple. The series also garnered her a nomination for Best Actress at Hum Awards.

Aziz then starred in Gustakh Ishq opposite Zahid Ahmed and did a guest appearance in 2017 series Dil-e-Jaanam. She appeared in Ghairat (series based on Honour Killing) along with Syed Jibran and Muneeb Butt and in romantic drama Khamoshi opposite Zara Noor Abbas, Affan Waheed and Bilal Khan. The later of which was a critically and commercial hit. In Khamoshi, Aziz played the character of Naeema, an arrogant, greedy and career-driven girl. Her role as antagonist was praised. A reviewer from Mangobaaz wrote, "The way she has portrayed Naeema’s character so well that you can’t help but hate her". Aziz walked the ramp for designer Aisha Farid's collection Crystalline on Hum TV's Bridal Couture Week. In early January 2018, she wrapped up the shooting of an Urdu music video "O Jaana" with Hamza Malik and Rahat Fateh Ali Khan which was released in July 2018, and did a special appearance in Asim Azhar's music video "Jo Tu Na Mila".

=== Breakthrough in Suno Chanda and beyond (2018–present) ===
The following year, Aziz collaborated with Shehzad Sheikh for the second time, (alongside Bilal Abbas Khan and Omair Rana) in Idream Entertainment's Qurban. She appeared as Heer, a bubbly and bright girl hailing from a rich household and was seen in a love triangle opposite Sheikh and Khan. She portrayed the role of Ajiya Nazakat (Jiya) in Suno Chanda which was a finite series during Ramadan 2018. She was paired opposite Farhan Saeed. Aziz and Saeed were praised for their on-screen chemistry. The series received mix reviews and earned her a nomination for Best Television Actress at Lux Style Awards. In an interview, Aziz said that she was overwhelmed and was not expect the series to be the massive hit. She played the role of Tabeer in Hum TV's Tabeer. Ahmed Sarym of The Express Tribune states, "At such a young age, Aziz has already proven her mettle through a wide range of characters from the exuberant Jiya to a vampish Naeema in Khamoshi and the titular character of Tabeer".

She then appeared in Faiza Iftikhar's Ranjha Ranjha Kardi. Her role as Noori belongs to the lower cast of Untouchables was praised by critics. Buraq Shabbir of The News International stated, "Popularly known as the feisty Jia from Suno Chanda and now the equally fiery Noori in Ranjha Ranjha Kardi, has spark". In 2019, she appeared in Suno Chanda 2 A sequel of Suno Chanda which is an Ahson Talish directorial and produced by MD Productions. The year 2020, she starred as Nirma in ARY Digital's dramatic Jhooti which received negative response and underperformed in ratings. In 2021, Aziz was seen playing Ameera in the social drama Raqeeb Se which starred an ensemble cast of Nauman Ijaz, Hadiqa Kiani and Sania Saeed. It received rave response from critics and earned her a nomination at the Lux Style Awards for Best Actress (Critics' Choice). Later in that year, she starred in the highly anticipated romantic drama Khuda Aur Mohabbat 3 opposite Feroze Khan. It gained high viewership and became 2nd most watched Pakistani television series on YouTube with negative reviews from critics for its problematic plot. Writing for Oddonee opined, "People are not sure if Khuda Aur Mohabbat 3 is a drama or a trauma. All I can say is that we had high expectations, but it doesn’t meet any of it".

After a brief hiatus, Aziz made her television comeback with Geo Entertainment's family comedy drama Mannat Murad opposite Talha Chahour and directed by Syed Wajahat Hussain. The show panned by critics for its repetitive storyline, performances of leads and development. In a review stated, "it’s bad and you wouldn’t even watch it beyond 15 minutes" and also dislike the chemistry between the lead pair. if it wasn’t for Iqra’s reputation but even that isn’t enough to salvage it". In 2024, she starred in ARY Digital's romantic comedy drama Burns road Kay Romeo Juliet opposite Hamza Sohail.

In 2025, She appeared in romantic comedy television series Paradise, along with Shuja Asad.

== Other work and media image ==
Aziz has been described in the media, among Pakistan's most popular and highest-paid actresses. In September 2018, she won the Most Stylish TV actor Award at the Hum TV Style Awards. She also performed on Hum Style Awards along with Farhan Saeed. She serves as an ambassador for a number of brands such as 7up, Nestle, Cadbury, and National Foods. In November 2018 she paired with model Hasnain Lehri to launch OPPO's A7 in Pakistan. She was also the brand ambassador for the same. She was named in the Top 50 Sexiest Asian Women List by Eastern Eye and most searched people of Google Pakistan in 2018.

After the success of Ranjha Ranjha Kardi and Suno Chanda, she was cited by The News International as playing an inspirational female character on Pakistani television. In July 2019, controversy arose after few pictures of Iqra's vacation in Thailand circa 2018 wherein she was dressed in beach-styled minimal clothing. The photos garnered negative reaction on social media and her sister, Sidra Aziz, took to Twitter to express her discomfort over the negative comments.

She has also appeared as a guest in serials and talkshows. Her first guest appearance was in Jago Pakistan Jago in 2015. In 2018 she appeared as a Guest in The After Moon Show a comedy-talkshow and Tonite with HSY. In May 2018, Aziz became a victim of news after breaching contract with the Citrus talent. Fahad Hussain, Head of Citrus Talent states, Aziz breached an agreement that states the latter has to solely work in projects approved by the talent agency. She has, however signed contract and deal with another PR agency, despite being reminded of the first contract. In response Aziz denies the allegations saying, "Fahad never provided her with a copy of the agreement that she breached and used to delay her rightful payments for many months". Later the dispute was solved by their lawyers on which both said,

“We want to thank our lawyers for mediating between us and resolving our issues which arose due to miscommunication and misunderstandings. Also, we have both mutually decided to continue working with each other in the future. So, guys, we are back with a bang!!!”

== Personal life ==
On 7 July 2019, at the 18th Lux Style Awards, Aziz became engaged to actor and writer Yasir Hussain. On 28 December 2019, Aziz married Hussain. In July 2021, Aziz gave birth to their son.

== Filmography ==
=== Films ===
Key
†	Denotes films that have not yet been released

Year	Title	Role	Notes	Ref.
2023	Allahyar and the 100 Flowers of God	Aira	Voice role	
2027	Untitled Murtaza Chaudhry romance †	TBA	Filming	

=== Television ===
Year	Title	Role	Notes	Ref.
2014	Kissey Apna Kahein	Shanzey		
2015	Muqaddas	Muqaddas		
2015	Mol	Sajjal		
2016	Socha Na Tha	Shafaq		
2016	Deewana	Meher Sultana		
2016	Kisay Chahoon	Marina Zaman		
2016	Laaj	Mannat Chaudhry		
2016	Choti Si Zindagi	Ameena		
2016	Natak	Shafaq		
2017	Gustakh Ishq	Najaf Quddus		
2017	Ghairat	Saba		
2017	Khamoshi	Naeema Sabir		
2017	Dil-e-Jaanam	Sameera	Cameo appearance	
2018	Qurban	Heer Shahmir Khan		
2018	Suno Chanda	Ajiya "Jiya" Nazakat		
2018	Tabeer	Tabeer		
2018	Ranjha Ranjha Kardi	Noor "Noori" Bano		
2019	Suno Chanda 2	Ajiya "Jiya" Arsal Ali		
2020	Jhooti	Nirma Akbar		
2021	Raqeeb Se	Ameera Ali		
2021	Khuda Aur Muhabbat 3	Mahi Kazim Shah		
2023	Mannat Murad	Mannat Choudhary		
2024	Burns Road Kay Romeo Juliet	Freeya Motiwala		
2025	Paradise	Fia Taimoor		

=== Web Series ===
Year	Title	Role	Notes	Ref
2022	Aik Thi Laila	Laila	Mini series	
2026	Jo Bachay Hain Sang Samait Lo †	Umme Kulsoom aka Liza	Netflix	

=== Music videos ===
Year	Song	Artist	Notes
2018	"O Jaana"	Rahat Fateh Ali Khan, Hamza Malik	
2018	"Jo Tu Na Mila"	Asim Azhar	
2021	"Mera Jora"	Zeb Bangash	

== Awards and nominations ==
Year	Award	Category	Work	Result	Ref.
2016	4th Hum Awards	Best Television Sensation Female	Mol	Won	
2016	4th Hum Awards	Best Supporting Actress	Mol	Nominated	
2017	5th Hum Awards	Best Actress Popular	Choti Si Zindagi	Nominated	
2017	5th Hum Awards	Best On-screen Couple along with Shehzad Sheikh	Choti Si Zindagi	Nominated	
2018	Hum Style Awards	Most Stylish TV Actress	None	Won	
2019	Lux Style Awards	Best Television Actress – (Viewers' Choice)	Suno Chanda	Won	
2019	Lux Style Awards	Best Television Actress – (Critics' Choice)	Suno Chanda	Won	
2019	Hum Awards	Best Actress (Popular)	Suno Chanda	Won	
2019	IPPA Awards	Best Television Actress (Jury)	Suno Chanda	Won	
2019	Hum Awards	Best On-Screen Couple along with Farhan Saeed(Popular)	Suno Chanda	Won	
2019	Hum Awards	Best Actress	Tabeer	Nominated	
2019	Hum Awards	Best on-screen Couple along with Shehzad Sheikh	Tabeer	Nominated	
2020	Hum Style Awards	Most Stylish TV Actress	Ranjha Ranjha Kardi	Nominated	
2020	Pakistan International Screen Awards	Best Television Actress	Ranjha Ranjha Kardi	Nominated	
2020	19th Lux Style Awards	Best Actress (Critics' Choice)	Ranjha Ranjha Kardi	Won	
2022	8th Hum Awards	Best Actress Popular	Raqeeb Se	Nominated	
2022	8th Hum Awards	Best Actress Jury	Raqeeb Se	Won	
2022	21st Lux Style Awards	Best Actress – (Critics' Choice)	Raqeeb Se	Nominated	
2023	Lux Style Awards	Best Actress – (Critics)	Aik Thi Laila	Nominated	
2023	IPPA Awards	Best TV Actor (Female)	Aik Thi Laila	Nominated	
2023	IPPA Awards	Best On-Screen Couple with (Yasir Hussain)	Aik Thi Laila	Nominated	
2024	PMMA Awards	Recognition in excellence	—N/a	Won	
