= Kisay Chahoon =

- Genre: Family drama Serial drama Romantic drama
- Created by: Momina Duraid
- Written by: Mehwish Hassan
- Directed by: Ahmed Bhatti
- Starring: Sonya Hussain; Noor Hassan Rizvi; Ali Abbas; Iqra Aziz
- Opening theme: "Kisay Chahoon" by Shuja Haider & Beena Khan
- Composer: Farrukh Abid
- Country of origin: Pakistan
- Original language: Urdu
- No. of episodes: 28

Production
- Producer: Moomal Entertainment
- Production locations: Hyderabad, Sindh; Karachi, Sindh
- Camera setup: Multi-Camera
- Running time: 30–45 minutes
- Production company: Moomal Entertainment

Original release
- Network: Hum TV
- Release: 3 February – 5 May 2016

Related
- Deewana

Kisay Chahoon (Urdu: کسے چاہوں; ISO: Kisē Chāhūṁ; lit: Whom Should I Choose?) is a Pakistani television series that premiered on Hum TV on February 3, 2016. It is directed by Ahmed Bhatti, written by Mehwish Hassan and produced by Moomal Qazi Shunaid.

== Plot ==
=== Summary ===
The drama revolves around the life of a young girl, Mehru (Soniya Hussain) who is in love with her cousin Hamza (Noor Hassan). Because of familial arrangements, Mehru has to marry Ameer (Ali Abbas), while Hamza marries Marina Zaman (Iqra Aziz), the daughter of his boss Zaman (Manzoor Qureshi).

== Cast ==
- Sonya Hussain as Mehru Ameer
- Noor Hassan Rizvi as Hamza
- Ali Abbas as Amir Jamal
- Iqra Aziz as Marina Zaman
- Firdous Jamal as Jabbar Ahmed
- Manzoor Qureshi as Zaman
- Shaheen Khan as Shakira
- Nusrat Jahan
- Rubina Arif as Marina's mother
- Pari Hashmi as Maryam
- Fouzia Mushtaq as Zakkiya

== Production ==
Talking about the drama serial, Sonya told Brandsynario, "The play is about a struggle of a young girl with herself as she has to choose between two guys – a man who gives her respect and love and in return doesn’t demand anything. On the other hand, there is someone whose company she thoroughly enjoys and can’t think of living without him."

== See also ==
- 2016 in Pakistani television
- List of programs broadcast by Hum TV
