= Abdullah Seja =

Pakistani producer

- Born: Karachi, Pakistan
- Occupation: Producer
- Known for: Producing drama serials and films

Abdullah Seja (Urdu: عبداللہ سیجا) is a Pakistani producer and chief operating officer of IDream Entertainment. Some of his well known work includes Bay Dardi, Koi Chand Rakh, Qurban, Noor ul Ain, Jhooti, Kaisa Hai Naseeban, and Shehnai.

== Filmography ==
=== As producer ===
- Baddua
- Angna
- Ijazat
- Bay Dardi
- Rukhsati
- Sukoon
- Ghisi Piti Mohabbat
- Noor ul Ain
- Baby Baji
- Hangor S-131
- Fraud
- Rasm E Duniya
- Qurban
- Kaisi Teri Khudgarzi
- Kaisa Hai Naseeban
- Haiwan
- Beti
- Pehli Si Muhabbat
- Log Kya Kahenge
- Berukhi
- Bhool
- Mere Khudaya
- Sannata
- Mere Harjai
- Koi Chand Rakh
- Barfi Laddu
- Dareecha
- Ghairat
