= 5th Hum Awards =

2017 Pakistani entertainment awards

- Sponsored by: Pel
- Date: 29 April 2017
- Country: Lahore
- Presented by: Hum Network
- Hosted by: Sanam Jung; Mikaal Zulfiqar; Nadia Khan; Hareem Farooq
- Preshow hosts: Yasir Hussain; Ahmad Ali Butt

Highlights
- Most awards: Sang-e-Mar Mar; Udaari
- Most nominations: Udaari; Sang-e-Mar Mar; Mann Mayal
- Best On-screen couple: Hamza Ali Abbasi; Maya Ali
- Best Actress: Mahira Khan
- Best Actor: Hamza Ali Abbasi
- Best Drama Serial: Udaari
- Best Soap: Haya Ke Daaman Main
- Website: humawards.com

Television/radio coverage
- Network: Hum TV
- Runtime: 3 hours 21 minutes

The 5th Hum Awards ceremony, presented by Pel, powered by QMobile and brought by Kashmir Cooking Oil & Banaspati, took place in Lahore on 29 April 2017 at 7:30pm PST. The ceremony was televised in Hum TV on 22 July 2017. During the ceremony, Hum Awards were presented in 25 categories.

The show was hosted by Hareem Farooq, Mikaal Zulfiqar, and Nadia Khan, while comedy hosting was done by Yasir Hussain and Ahmad Ali Butt. .

== Winners and nominees ==
The public voting was announced in seven Viewers Choice Award Categories on 8 April 2017 until 18 April 2017.

Winners are listed first, highlighted in boldface.

Jury Choice Categories
**Best Drama Serial**: **Udaari – MD Productions, Kashf Foundation**; Bin Roye – MD Productions; Choti Si Zindagi – MD Productions; Sang-e-Mar Mar – MD Productions; Gul-e-Rana – MD Productions, Six Sigma Plus; Mann Mayal – MD Productions, Sana Shahnawaz, Tariq Shah, Samina Humayun Saeed
**Best Director Drama Serial**: **Ehteshamuddin – Udaari**; Farooq Rind – Gul-e-Rana; Ilyas Kashmiri – Abro; Haseeb Hassan – Mann Mayal; Misbah Khalid – Pakeeza; Saife Hassan – Sang-e-Mar Mar	**Best Writer Drama Serial**: **Mustafa Afridi – Sang-e-Mar Mar**; **Farhat Ishtiaq – Udaari**; Samra Bukhari – Gul-e-Rana; Bushra Ansari – Pakeeza; Sarwat Nazir – Choti Si Zindagi; Qaisara Hayat – Abro
**Best Actor**: **Ahsan Khan – Udaari as Imtiaz Ali Sheikh**; Humayun Saeed – Bin Roye as Irtiza; Hamza Ali Abbasi – Mann Mayal as Salahuddin; Mikaal Zulfiqar – Sang-e-Mar Mar as Aurang; Osman Khalid Butt – Sanam as Harib; Feroze Khan – Gul-e-Rana as Adeel	**Best Actress**: **Sajal Ali – Gul-e-Rana as Gul-e-Rana**; Urwa Hocane – Udaari as Meeran; Iqra Aziz – Choti Si Zindagi as Ameena; Mahira Khan – Bin Roye as Saba; Maya Ali – Mann Mayal as Manahil; Aamina Sheikh – Pakeeza as Pakeeza
**Best Supporting Actor**: **Paras Masroor – Sang-e-Mar Mar as Torah Khan**; Imran Ashraf – Gul-e-Rana as Ashar; Gohar Rasheed – Mann Mayal as Mikaeel Shahaab; Farhan Saeed – Udaari as Taimoor Arshad	**Best Supporting Actress**: **Sania Saeed – Sang-e-Mar Mar as Shameem**; Saba Faisal – Zara Yaad Kar as Aneesa Begum; Asma Abbas – Abro as Sakina; Ayesha Khan – Mann Mayal as Jeena; Samiya Mumtaz – Udaari as Sajida Bibi
**Best Soap Actor**: **Hammad Farooqui – Haya Ke Daaman Main as Babar**; Shamil Khan – Bad Gumaan as Salman; Furqan Qureshi – Zindagi Tujh Ko Jiya as Zeeshan	**Best Soap Actress**: **Sanam Chaudhry – Zindagi Tujh Ko Jiya as Maryam**; Sukaina Khan – Haya Ke Daaman Main as Haya; Mahajbeen Khan – Bad Gumaan as Sania
**Best Soap Series**: **Haya Ke Daaman Main – MD Productions**; Zindagi Tujh Ko Jiya – MD Productions; Bad Gumaan – MD Productions and Everyday Pictures
**Best Television Film**: **Chaman Ara – Momina Duraid Productions**	**Best Television Sensation Female**: **Kubra Khan – Sang-e-Mar Mar as Shireen**
**Best Actor in a Negative Role**: **Ahsan Khan – Udaari as Imtiaz Ali Sheikh**; Uzma Hassan – Sang-e-Mar Mar as Shehrbano "Bano"; Ayesha Khan – Mann Mayal as Jeena; Alyy Khan – Pakeeza as Jibran; Farah Shah – Abro as Zubaida; Junaid Khan – Bin Roye as Safir	**Most Impactful Character**: **Bushra Ansari – Udaari as Sheedan**; **Noman Ijaz – Sang-e-Mar Mar as Gulistan Khan**; Ahsan Khan – Udaari as Imtiaz Ali Sheikh; Sania Saeed – Sang-e-Mar Mar as Shameem; Samiya Mumtaz – Udaari as Sajida Bibi
**Best Child Actor**: **Arshiya Ahsan – Udaari as Zebo**	**Best Onscreen Couple**: **Farhan Saeed and Urwa Hocane – Udaari**; Maya Ali and Hamza Ali Abbasi – Mann Mayal; Feroz Khan and Sajal Ali – Gul-e-Rana; Mikaal Zulfiqar and Kubra Khan – Sang-e-Mar Mar; Mahira Khan and Humayun Saeed – Bin Roye; Shehzad Sheikh and Iqra Aziz – Choti Si Zindagi
**HBL Special Award**: **Samina Baig - Mountaineer**	**Recognition Awards**: **Actor In Law**; **Janaan**; **Mah e Mir**
Viewers Choice Categories
**Best Drama Serial Popular**: **Udaari – MD Productions and Kashf Foundation**; Bin Roye – MD Productions; Choti Si Zindagi – MD Productions; Sang-e-Mar Mar – MD Productions; Gul-e-Rana – MD Productions, Six Sigma Plus; Mann Mayal – MD Productions, Sana Shahnawaz, Tariq Shah, Samina Humayun Saeed
**Best Actor Popular**: **Hamza Ali Abbasi – Mann Mayal as Salahuddin**; **Ahsan Khan** – Udaari as Imtiaz Ali Sheikh; Humayun Saeed – Bin Roye as Irtiza; Mikaal Zulfiqar – Sang-e-Mar Mar as Aurang; Osman Khalid Butt – Sanam as Harib; Feroze Khan – Gul-e-Rana as Adeel	**Best Actress Popular**: **Mahira Khan – Bin Roye as Saba**; Sajal Ali – Gul-e-Rana as Gul-e-Rana; Urwa Hocane – Udaari as Meeran; Iqra Aziz – Choti Si Zindagi as Ameena; Maya Ali – Mann Mayal as Manahil; Aamina Sheikh – Pakeeza as Pakeeza
**Best Onscreen Couple Popular**: **Maya Ali and Hamza Ali Abbasi – Mann Mayal**; Feroz Khan and Sajal Ali – Gul-e-Rana; Urwa Hocane and Farhan Saeed – Udaari; Mikaal Zulfiqar and Kubra Khan – Sang-e-Mar Mar; Mahira Khan and Humayun Saeed – Bin Roye; Shehzad Sheikh and Iqra Aziz – Choti Si Zindagi	**Best Original Soundtrack Popular**: **"Tere Naal Main Laiyaan" from Mann Mayal – Performed by Qurat-ul-Ain Balouch**; "Sajna Ve Sajna" – Udaari; "Sang-e-Mar Mar Ka Dil" – Sang-e-Mar Mar; "Naina Rehte Hain Kahain" – Bin Roye; "Chali Simt-e Ghaib" – Deewana; "Zara Yaad Kar" – Zara Yaad Kar
**Best Music Video**: **Soheb Akhtar – for Atif Aslam's "Khair Mangda"**; Hamza Yousaf – for Farhan Saeed's "Koi Rokay Naa Mujhe"; Zaw Ali – for Sajjad Ali's "Naakhun"; Hamza Yousaf – for Qurat-ul-Ain Balouch's "Saiyaan"; Kamal Khan – for Zoe Viccaji's "Ho Jaao Azaad"; Saqib Khan – for Shehzad Roy's "Jind Jaan"	**Best Music Single**: **Qurat-ul-Ain Balouch – "Bulleya Saiyaan"**

=== Dramas with multiple nominations and awards ===
The following eleven dramas received multiple nominations:

Nominations	Drama
16	Udaari
13	Mann Mayal
13	Sang-e-Mar Mar
11	Gul-e-Rana
10	Bin Roye
6	Choti Si Zindagi
5	Pakeeza
4	Abro
2	Sanam
2	Zara Yaad Kar
1	Deewana

The following seven dramas received multiple awards:

Awards	Drama
9	Udaari
5	Sang-e-Mar Mar
3	Mann Mayal
2	Haya Ke Daaman Main
1	Bin Roye
1	Gul-e-Rana
1	Zindagi Tujh Ko Jiya

== Controversy ==
The actor, Yasir Hussain, who co-hosted the show, was alleged for his inappropriate joke on child molestation when granting the award of Best Negative Role to Ahsan Khan.
