= Tum Ho Wajah =

Pakistani television series by Momina Duraid

- Official title card
- تم ہو وجہ
- Genre: Romantic drama Revenge
- Written by: Samina Ijaz
- Directed by: Saima Waseem
- Starring: Savera Nadeem; Shahood Alvi; Sumbul Iqbal; Shehzad Sheikh; Saboor Aly
- Opening theme: "Tum Ho Wajah" by Faiza Mujahid and Waqar Ali
- Composer: Waqar Ali
- Country of origin: Pakistan
- Original language: Urdu
- No. of seasons: 1
- No. of episodes: 28

Production
- Producers: Erum Binte Shahid; Momina Duraid
- Cinematography: Asim Raza
- Production companies: DramayBaaz Productions; MD Productions

Original release
- Network: Hum TV
- Release: 20 April – 13 November 2020

Tum Ho Wajah (Urdu: تم ہو وجہ, lit. 'You are the reason') is a Pakistani romantic-revenge drama television series premiered on Hum TV on 20 April 2020. It is written by Samina Ijaz, developed by Shahzad Javed, Head of Content, HUM TV, directed by Saima Waseem and produced by Momina Duraid under MD Productions. The series, starring Savera Nadeem, Shahood Alvi, Sumbul Iqbal, Saboor Aly, Ali Abbas and Shehzad Sheikh, is an intense story of love and revenge.

== Cast ==
- Savera Nadeem as Sehba (Chanda's Mother)
- Shahood Alvi as Mansoor
- Sumbul Iqbal as Chanda
- Shehzad Sheikh as Shahaab
- Saboor Aly as Sitara
- Ali Abbas as Babar
- Kashif Mehmood as Muraad
- Raza Talish as Danish
- Salma Hassan as Tara
- Noor Ul Hassan as Ghafoor
- Shehzeen Rahat as Iram
- Shermeen Ali as Sanna
- Kaiser Khan as Wajid

== Production ==
=== Promotion ===
It was revealed in September 2019 that Sumbul Iqbal and Shehzad Sheikh will be paired in a project and title was also announced. The first teaser was launched by Hum TV on 25 March 2020. The official teaser 2 was launched by Hum TV on 25 March 2020. The official teaser 3 was launched by Hum TV on 2 April 2020 revealed that the serial would release on 20 April 2020.

The teaser of OST was released on 11 April 2020. The OST is sung by Faiza Mujahid and Waqar Ali, whereas lyrics are by Sabir Zafar.

=== Broadcast ===
Tum Hi Wajah aired a weekly episode on Mondays succeeding Daasi starting from its premiere date. Later, the serial was shifted to 9pm slot on Fridays by replacing Mehboob Aapke Qadmon Main and make way for newly launched Mushk.

== Episodes ==
No.	Title	Directed by	Written by	Original release date
1	"Tum Ho Wajah Episode #01"	Saima Waseem	Samina Ejaz	April 20, 2020
Episodic reference:
2	"Tum Ho Wajah Episode #02"	Saima Waseem	Samina Ejaz	April 27, 2020
Episodic reference:
3	"Tum Ho Wajah Episode #03"	Saima Waseem	Samina Ejaz	May 4, 2020
Episodic reference:
4	"Tum Ho Wajah Episode #04"	Saima Waseem	Samina Ejaz	May 11, 2020
Episodic reference:

== Soundtrack ==
Tum Ho Wajah

Soundtrack album by Waqar Ali
- Released: 18 April 2020
- Recorded: 2020
- Genre: Television soundtrack
- Length: 2:49
- Language: Urdu
- Label: Hum TV

Music video
- "OST: Tum Ho Wajah" on YouTube

The OST is composed by Waqar Ali on lyrics of Sabir Zafar and sung by Faiza Mujahid and Waqar Ali.

== See also ==
- List of programs broadcast by Hum TV
