= Tabeer (TV series) =

Pakistani television series

- Written by: Imran Ashraf
- Directed by: Ahson Talish
- Starring: Shehzad Sheikh; Iqra Aziz; Aamir Qureshi
- Opening theme: "Dukh Mere Aas Paas Chalte Hain" by Nabeel Shaukat Ali
- Ending theme: "Dukh Mere Saath Saath Chalte Hain" by Nabeel Shaukat Ali
- Country of origin: Pakistan
- Original language: Urdu
- No. of seasons: 1
- No. of episodes: 26

Production
- Production company: Momina Duraid Productions

Original release
- Network: Hum TV
- Release: 20 February – 14 August 2018

Tabeer (English: Interpretation) is a Pakistani television series created by Momina Duraid under MD Productions that premiered on Hum TV on February 20, 2018. It stars Iqra Aziz and Shehzad Sheikh. It is directed by Ahson Talish and written by Imran Ashraf.

The drama is the third on-screen collaboration between Shehzad Sheikh and Iqra Aziz after Choti Si Zindagi and Qurban and the second collaboration of Imran Ashraf and Eshal Fayyaz after Abro.

A dubbed version of the serial in Pashto was aired on Hum Pashto 1.

== Plot ==
Tabeer (Iqra Aziz) is pregnant with her husband Yasir's child. Yasir (Imran Ashraf) works for Fawad. Fawad's mother is somewhat arrogant, but Fawad (Shehzad Sheikh) is a very generous and simple man. Fawad is married to Zarnish (Eshal Fayyaz), who gives birth to his child but dies of cancer. Yasir also dies in a car accident. Tabeer is in great shock and later gives birth to Yasir's son, who also dies later because of Ajju's (Ali Safina's) carelessness.

Sania (Hajra Yameen) is a very emotional character who loves Fawad madly but is depressed after being rejected. To lessen her pain, she joins a school where she meets a painter (Ahson Talish), who is also emotionally struggling after losing his wife. He starts to love Sania secretly.

Tabeer feeds Fawad's child, and after a series of ups and downs in her life, Fawad marries her secretly in her house with the approval of Daadi (Azra Mansoor). Meanwhile, Fawad's mother takes his proposal of marriage to Sania's house without consulting him. After finding out, he calls Sania and tells her about his marriage to Tabeer. Sania's heart is broken again, and she goes to her best friend the painter's house, but when she discovers that he has left for London, she panics and accidentally falls into a swimming pool. She is hospitalized in a serious condition.

Fawad's brother (Raza Talish) returns from abroad and starts to take an interest in Tabeer without knowing that she is his sister-in-law. After finding out, he grabs a pistol and tries to kill himself. Fawad tries to save him, but in the attempt, is shot in the chest. Finally, after much drama he is saved and Fawad's mother happily accepts Tabeer. Sania is proposed to by the painter and she accepts it readily.

Seven years later, Tabeer is happy and living with Fawad and his child.

== Cast ==
- Shehzad Sheikh as Fawad
- Iqra Aziz as Tabeer
- Imran Ashraf as Yasir
- Eshal Fayyaz as Zarnish
- Mizna Waqas as Muskaan
- Raza Talish as Shehryar
- Ali Safina as Ajju
- Bee Gul
- Zainab Ahmed as Asma
- Azra Mansoor as Daadi
- Aamir Qureshi as Rafaqat
- Seemi Pasha as Shehryar and Fawad's mother
- Annie Zaidi as Asma (Zarnish's mother)
- Hajra Yamin as Sania
- Khalid Shaheen as Zarnish's father
- Shah Saleem
- Malik Raza as Khalid
- Falak as Khalid's son
- Kunaan Chaudhry
- Ayesha Khan Jr.
- Ahson Talish as the painter (Sania's husband)
- Saima Kanwal
- Nabeela Kanwal
- Ahmad Bashir
- Malik Tanveer
- Naseer Dar
- Masooma Jaffry
- Mohsin

== Production ==
Imran Ashraf wrote the script for Tabeer during his downtime. The script was initially rejected by most TV channels. Ashraf had written 14 episodes when Ahson Talish got a hold of it and asked him to complete it. Talish wanted to direct the series, but initially it was rejected by the production house.

== Awards and nominations ==
Year	Awards	Category	Nominated work	Result	Ref(s)
2019	Hum Awards	Best Actor Popular	Shehzad Sheikh	Nominated	
2019	Hum Awards	Best Onscreen Couple	Iqra Aziz & Shehzad Sheikh	Nominated	
2019	Hum Awards	Best Actor Female - Popular	Iqra Aziz	Nominated	
2019	Hum Awards	Best Drama Serial - Popular	Tabeer	Nominated	
2019	Hum Awards	Best Writer	Imran Ashraf	Nominated	
2019	Hum Awards	Best Director	Ahson Talish	Nominated	
2019	Hum Awards	Best OST	Momina Duraid	Nominated	

== See also ==
- List of programs broadcast by Hum TV
