= Abdullahpur Ka Devdas =

Pakistani Urdu-language romantic drama television series

- Created by: Zee Zindagi
- Based on: Devdas by Sarat Chandra Chattopadhyay
- Directed by: Anjum Shahzad
- Original language: Urdu
- No. of episodes: 13

Production
- Production location: Pakistan
- Cinematography: Nabil Hassan Rizvi
- Editors: Syed Ahsan Nawazish and Syed Mohammad Usman Sohail
- Production company: Zee Entertainment Enterprises

Original release
- Release: 26 February 2024

Abdullahpur Ka Devdas is a 2024 Pakistani Urdu-language romantic drama television series produced by Shailja Kejriwal for Zee Zindagi. Directed by Anjum Shahzad and written by Shahid Dogar, the series is a modern adaptation of Sarat Chandra Chattopadhyay’s 1917 Bengali novel Devdas. It premiered on February 26, 2024, on Zee Zindagi and is available for streaming on Zindagi’s YouTube channel. It stars Bilal Abbas Khan, Sarah Khan, and Raza Talish in the lead roles and has been noted for its poetic narrative, cinematography, and performances, though it has received mixed reviews for its pacing and storytelling.

== Plot ==
Set in the fictional small town of Abdullahpur and parts of Lahore, the series follows Fakhar (Bilal Abbas Khan) and Kashif (Raza Talish), two best friends unknowingly in love with the same woman, Gulbano (Sarah Khan). Gulbano is captivated by the poetry of an anonymous poet named Devdas. As the story unfolds, Kashif claims to be Devdas to win Gulbano’s affection, unaware that Fakhar is the true Devdas. The series explores themes of unrequited love, friendship, betrayal, and societal pressures.

== Cast ==
- Bilal Abbas Khan as Fakhar Wazir/Devdas
- Sarah Khan as Gul Bano
- Raza Talish as Kashif Zubair
- Saad Qureshi as Bedaar Bakht
- Ali Ansari as Shehroze Khan
- Naumaan Ijaz as Qais/Shehenshah
- Anoushay Abbasi as Jameela Deewan
- Savera Nadeem as Jahan Aara Begum
- Anumta Qureshi as Qandeel
- Nida Mumtaz as Sakeena Zubair
- Noor Ul Hassan as Deewan
- Adnan Shah Tipu as Yaqoob
- Shahzad Nawaz as Salabat Khan
- Arjumand Rahim as Afaaf
- Zuhab Khan as Sim Card
- Irfan Moti wala as Shaukat Shaukeen
- Kashif Hussain as Samajid
- Fazal Hussain as Rehan
- Srha Asghar as Literature Festival Host

== Production ==
In October 2019, it was reported that Anjum Shahzad of Khaani fame would direct the web series Abdullahpur Ka Devdas, for which writer Shahid Dogar had been onboard under Umera Ahmed's supervision under her company Alif Kitab Publication. On revealing their upcoming lineup in June 2020, Zindagi revealed the principal cast of the series. The series was filmed in 2020, just before the beginning of the COVID-19 pandemic, but released in 2024 after a delay. The series was produced as a Zindagi Original for Indian television, marking a significant cross-border collaboration. The soundtrack, features tracks like “Biba Sada Dil Morr De” by Zain Ali, Zohaib Ali, Sami Khan, and Iqra Manzoor, and “Oh Sahib” by Adnan Dhool, Zain & Zohaib.

== Release ==
The series debuted on February 26, 2024, on ZEE5's Zindagi, with new episodes airing every Friday and Saturday. It is also available on Zindagi's YouTube channel and Zee5, with a feature film adaptation released in 2025. The series has been accessible to audiences in India and Pakistan, contributing to its cross-cultural appeal.

The series premiered in early 2026 on Express Entertainment.

== Reception ==
Abdullahpur Ka Devdas received mixed reviews. Critics praised the performances of Bilal Abbas Khan, Sarah Khan, and Raza Talish, as well as the cinematography capturing the essence of Abdullahpur and Lahore. The soundtrack and nostalgic tone were also highlighted as strengths. However, some reviews criticized the slow pacing, underdeveloped characters, and overly poetic dialogue, with Pakistanicinema.net describing it as a “noxious cocktail” of Pakistani drama and Indian soap aesthetics. Others, like Fuchsia Magazine, lauded the emotional depth and character-driven narrative, calling it a “vintage love tale” that resonates with audiences.
