= Raza Talish =

Pakistani actor

- Born: 2 November; Lahore, Punjab, Pakistan
- Education: National College of Arts
- Occupations: Actor; Television producer Television director
- Years active: 2018–present
- Notable work: Suno Chanda 2
- Relatives: Agha Ali Abbas Qizilbash (grandfather); Aehsun Talish (father)

Raza Talish (Urdu, Punjabi: رضا طالش) is a Pakistani actor and director.

Born in Lahore, Punjab, the son of director Aehsun Talish and grandson of senior actor Agha Talish, Raza is best known for his role as Shahryar in Tabeer (2018) and as Mithu in Suno Chanda 2 (2019).

== Early life and education ==
Talish was born in Lahore but now resides in Karachi. An alumnus of the Lyceum School, Lahore, he joined the National College of Arts (NCA) for higher education, completing his bachelor's degree in film-making, and after completing his studies he integrated his father's company and started directing plays while also working on television commercials as assistant.

== Career ==
He made his acting debut in the 2018 Pakistan television drama serial Tabeer. In 2019, he appeared as Subugtageen (Mithu) in Hum TV's Suno Chanda 2, which earned him critical acclaim and recognition.

He worked as an assistant director for the 2022 drama film Tich Button, featuring Farhan Saeed and Iman Ali.

== Filmography ==
Key
†	Denotes film/serial that have not yet been released

=== Television series ===
Year	Title	Role	Producer	Network	Ref(s)
2013	Numm	No	Yes	Geo Entertainment	
2018	Tabeer	Shehryar		Hum TV	
2019	Suno Chanda 2	Subugtageen / Mithoo		Hum TV	
2020	Mushk	Saqib		Hum TV	
2020	Tum Ho Wajah	Danish		Hum TV	
2023	Jaan-e-Jahan	Abdul Shah		ARY Digital	

=== Film ===
Year	Title	Role	Notes
2022	Tich Button	—	Assistant director

=== Web series ===
Year	Title	Role	Platform	Notes
2021	Dhoop Ki Deewar	Junaid Ansar	ZEE5	Indian co-production
2024	Abdullahpur Ka Devdas	Fakhr / Devdas	Zindagi / ZEE5	Indian co-production
