= Hangor S-131 =

2021 Pakistani military telefilm

- Release Poster
- Genre: Historical; Drama; Thriller
- Written by: Saji Gul
- Directed by: Saqib Khan
- Starring: Zahid Ahmed; Saba Qamar; Affan Waheed; Hammad Shoaib; Arez Ahmed; Shahzad Sheikh
- Country of origin: Pakistan
- Original language: Urdu

Production
- Producer: Abdullah Seja
- Editors: Arsalan Waheed; Hassan Shafiq
- Running time: 101 minutes
- Production company: IDream Entertainment

Original release
- Network: ARY Digital
- Release: 26 December 2021

Hangor S-131 is a Pakistani historical drama telefilm produced by iDream Entertainment and released on ARY Digital on 26 December 2021. It is written by Saji Gul and directed by Saqib Khan. The telefilm is based on a Pakistani submarine taking on Indian warships, inspired from the real incidents of the 1971 Indo-Pak War. The film features Zahid Ahmed, Saba Qamar, Affan Waheed, Dur-e-Fishan Saleem, Hammad Shoaib, Arez Ahmed and Shahzad Sheikh in leading roles.

== Cast ==
- Zahid Ahmed as Cdr Ahmad Tasnim
- Saba Qamar as Naheed Ahmad Tasneem
- Affan Waheed as Lt Cdr Obaidullah Khan
- Dur-e-Fishan Saleem as Sameera, a journalist and hadi's fiancée
- Hammad Shoaib as Lt Faseeh Bukhari
- Arez Ahmed as Lt Allaudin
- Shehzad Sheikh as Lt Cdr Hadi
- Naima Khan as Lt Allaudin's mother
- Haris Waheed as Lt Cdr Noori Pasha
- Maryam Fatima as Naseema Noori Pasha
- Javed Sheikh as Chief of Naval staff 1971
- Nida Mumtaz as Hadi's mother
- Adnan Shah Tipu as Navy cook
- Nayyar Ejaz as Navy cook Gulsher's father
- Laila Wasti as Sameera's mother
- Paras Masroor as Navy cook Gulsher

== Production ==
The trailer of the film was released on 9 December 2021.

== See also ==
- Laal (film)
- Aik Hai Nigar
- Ek Thi Marium
