= Alif Allah Aur Insaan =

Pakistani Sufi spiritual drama series

- Urdu: الف الله اور انسان
- Genre: Sufi; Spirituality; Drama; Ontology
- Created by: Momina Duraid
- Based on: Alif Allah Aur Insaan by Qaisra Hayat
- Developed by: Hum Network
- Written by: Qaisra Hayat
- Directed by: Ahson Talish
- Presented by: Hum TV; Hum Network; MD Productions
- Starring: Mikaal Zulfiqar; Kubra Khan; Shehzad Sheikh; Ushna Shah; Imran Ashraf; Sana Fakhar
- Theme music composer: Naveed Nashad
- Opening theme: "Alif Allah Aur Insaan"; Singer(s); Shafqat Amanat Ali; Lyrics by Ahson Talish
- Composer: Naveed Nashad
- Country of origin: Pakistan
- Original languages: Urdu; Punjabi
- No. of seasons: 1
- No. of episodes: 43

Production
- Producer: Momina Duraid
- Production locations: Sindh; Punjab
- Cinematography: Zeb Rao
- Editor: Mehmood Ali
- Camera setup: Multi-camera setup
- Running time: 37-40 minutes
- Production company: MD Productions

Original release
- Network: Hum TV; PTV Home
- Release: 25 April 2017 – 13 February 2018

Alif Allah Aur Insaan (Urdu: الف اللہ اور انسان; lit: "A" Allah and Human) is a Pakistani Sufi spiritual drama series that originally aired on Hum TV from April 25, 2017 to February 13, 2018. It was produced by Momina Duraid, as part of a night program all under Duraid's MD Productions and was written by Qaisra Hayat, based on her novel of the same name. The series was directed by Ahson Talish. It was also telecast on state channel PTV Home from August 2019 through 2020. It stars Usman Peerzada, Mikaal Zulfiqar, Kubra Khan, Ushna Shah, Shehzad Sheikh, Imran Ashraf, and Sana Fakhar.

Alif Allah Aur Insaan revolved around five people from five totally different backgrounds and their faith and conviction. It highlighted the concept of how the Creator rewards people who believe in hard work and patience. The series received the highest ratings and positive reviews on its premiere, and was the slot leader throughout the time that it was on air.

== Plot ==
Alif Allah Aur Insaan is a story of trust, loyalty, and relationships. The story revolves around five different people from five totally different backgrounds and their faith and conviction. It highlights the concept of how the Creator rewards the people who believe in hard work and patience.

It depicts the story of a young landlord, Shahzeb, who once saw Nazneen Malik at her sister's wedding and fell in love with her. Nazneen happens to be the spoiled child of Hashmat Malik. At the same wedding, Nazneen insults Shamu and his ensemble, who were invited by her parents to perform a dance. Nazi insults them for being transgenders, after which Shammu curses her so that one day she will lose all her faith. Meanwhile, the story depicts the life of Rani, a street beggar, who is forced to bring the money she earns to her father. She believes in human equality and once saved Shamu from mocking goons, which left him in love with her. One day, Rani comes across a beautiful place where a florist tells her about the beauty and faith of the town's well-known woman,'Nigar Begum'. This fascinates Rani, who constantly prays to be like her one day. It is revealed that Nigar Begum is a head tawaif who shelters homeless girls in her kotha.

It's revealed, in flashbacks, that Shahzeb was once forced by his friends to see Nigar Begum's Mujra dance. Despite going there because of his friends' insistence, Shahzeb wasn't the least bit interested, which made Nigar fall in love with him. He rejects her love and insults her, after which a heartbroken Nigar curses him so that one day he will be rejected in the same way.

Rani's father decides to get her married to Rasheed, who will in turn pay him an extra Mahr Payment. In order to stop begging and to avoid her father's command to marry, Rani decides to fulfill her only dream of becoming like Nigar Begum. She visits Nigar and asks her to keep her as her maid, thinking that she will live a life better than that of a beggar. Rani rejects Shamu's love, insults him for being a transgender, and approaches Nigar Begum, keeping in mind that once she has arrived - she can never go back. Facing her rejection, Shamu is left heartbroken and decides to earn a decent living, thus joining a local barbershop. Nigar Begum keeps Rani as her maid and renames her, Reena Begum.

Shahzeb takes his marriage proposal for Nazneen to her father and gets engaged, while she isn't interested in marrying him. Later, she opens up about her wish to study, so she's sent to Lahore with Shahzeb's consent, and her parents consider Basit her guardian. With time, Shahzeb begins questioning himself and God about why Nazneen doesn't love him back. As his questions cause him to face religious confusion, he regularly visits an Islamic Molvi, whose knowledge and words help him.

Shamu becomes a popular hairstylist whereas Rani starts to realise that her life hasn't changed the way she imagined.

Nazneen falls in love with Basit, who holds his parents' respect as his highest priority.

== Cast ==
Main Characters of Alif Allah Aur Insaan featuring (left to right) Sana Nawaz as Nigar Begum Ushna Shah as Raani/Reena Begum, Mikaal Zulfiqar as Shahzeb, Kubra Khan as Nazneen, Shehzad Sheikh as Basit and Imran Ashraf as Shammo

=== Main cast ===
- Meekal Zulfiqar as Shahzeb Shah
- Qavi Khan as Ahmad Shah Bukhari (Baba Sain)
- Kubra Khan as Nazneen Malik
- Ushna Shah as Reena Begum (Rani)
- Shehzad Sheikh as Basit Ali
- Imran Ashraf as Shammo
- Sana Fakhar as Nigar Begum
- Usman Peerzada as Hashmat Malik

=== Supporting cast ===
- Annie Zaidi as Malkani, Nazneen's mother
- Naima Khan as Chaman Begum, Nigar's secretary
- Azra Mansoor as Zaitoon, Shahzeb's grandmother
- Nargis Rasheed as Barkate, Rani's mother
- Saife Hassan as Malka, Rani's father
- Noor ul Hassan as Qadir Ali, Basit's father
- Kinza Malik as Razia, Basit's mother
- Zahra Shah as Samina, Basit's sister
- Anas Ali Imran as Talha, Basit's friend
- Farhan Ali Agha as Nawazish Ali, a film producer and Nigar Begum's visitor
- Fahima Awan as Sarwat, Nazneen's roommate in hostel
- Hina Javed as Alisha, Nazneen's class fellow
- Akbar Islam as Achu, a flower seller near Nigar's Kotha
- Farrukh Darbar as Ustaad Chundu
- Aslam Sheikh as Nargis, Shammo's transgender mentor
- Sohail Masood as Barber, Shammo's mentor in profession
- Hassan Noman as Salma, Shammo's mentor in city
- Omar Shehzad as Shaheer
- Nimra Khan as Zimmal
- Ali Ansari as Arsalan
- Fazila Kaiser as Zimmil's mother
- Kaiser Khan Nizamani as Zimmil's father
- Seemi Pasha as Shaheer's mother
- Zia Gurchani
- Mahi Baloch as Fiza Bai, a tawaif from Nigar's Kotha
- Muhammad Ali Josh as Taimoor
- Nazish Jahangir as Roshni
- Bigul Hussain as Shahzeb's mother

== Production ==
=== Development ===
Alif Allah Aur Insaan is developed by Hum TV's senior producer Momina Duraid of MD Productions, the channel hired director Ahson Talish to direct the series. The story of the serial is based on Qaisra Hayat's novel of the same name. The screenplay was also written by Hayat while script composing was done by Muhammad Wasi-ul-Din who is best known for his compositions for channel series Diyar-e-Dil and Mann Mayal. Hayat has previously worked with Momina, when she wrote Saya-e-Dewar Bhi Nahi.

The song composition was done by Naveed Nashad while background scores were given by MAD Music, lyrics for the OST were penned by the director himself who chose Shafqat Amanat Ali for singing, thus marking Ali's comeback for Hum TV after performing the OST of the network's hit series Alvida in 2015. The channel released the first teaser promo on 13 April 2017 and premiered the series on 25 April 2017. It was given the prime slot on 8:00pm airing a weekly episode every Tuesdays. Under the production, Amir Shehzad and Saleem Sumrah were the production managers, while Akbar Balouch, Muhammad Bhatti and Amir Rehman khan were under the set department. Along with the director, Mehreen Suhail and Syed Sajad Habib were the executive directors.

=== Casting ===
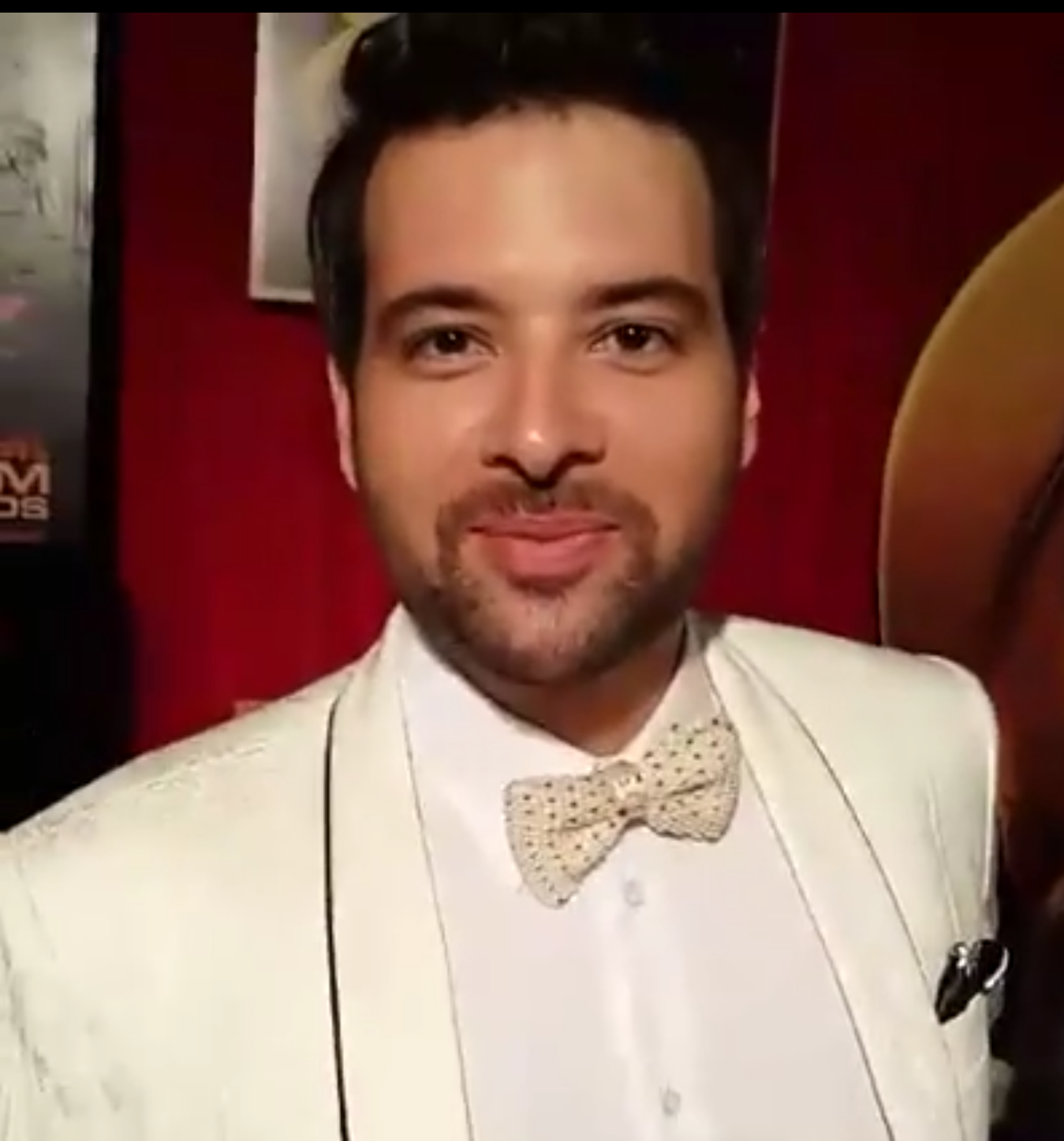
Mikaal Zulfiqar plays the male lead

Producer Momina Duraid, and director Ahson Talish mutually chose the cast which included Mikaal Zulfiqar, Ushna Shah, Sana Nawaz Kubra Khan, Shehzad Sheikh and Imran Ashraf to portray the leading roles. Mikaal Zulfiqar and Kubra Khan marked their second appearance together after their success in Duraid's Sang-e-Mar Mar. From 2015, actor Mikaal Zulfiqar was given several shows for the channel including Diyar-e-Dil, Maan, Sangat and Sang-e-Mar Mar all of which were a commercial success for the channel itself, after the channel's success in 2016's Sang-e-Mar Mar, Zulfiqar once again was finalised to portray the role of Shahzeb. Alongside Zulfiqar, Kubra Khan was finalised to portray the role of Nazneen after her success in her debut for Sange Mar Mar. The actress completed her series Muqabil and Andaz-e-Sitam for Ary Digital and Urdu1 and joined Alif Allah aur Insaan in 2017. Actor Shehzad Sheikh was finalised to portray the role of Basit right after the finale of his 2016 series Choti Si Zindagi.

Actress Ushna Shah was approached by the production head Mahesh Waswani from MD productions and Raza Moosavee, the head of the casting department for Hum TV. The actress was offered to portray the role of Rani which later earned her critical acclaim and success, Shah was interviewed by HIP and answered why she accepted the offer of Raani's role, she said, "When I read the script I knew I had to do it. Rani was just the one I had been looking for. The depth, the change, the crudeness, the rawness, and the reality is something the artist inside me had been craving since I joined the industry. Rani reminded me of why I became an actor" Speaking about her role Shah said, "Rani evolves a lot as she is an amalgamation of things: The walk was inspired by a lady who used to work in our house when I was a child; ironically her name was also Rani. The dialect was watching the working class growing up in Lahore. A lot of the mannerisms were things I observed in young girls begging on the street. So yes there was some character research involved at my end but everything else was thanks to the genius, Ahson Talish. He crafted the crassness of Rani beautifully, he created her." Alongside Shah, Lollywood film actress Sana Nawaz was approached by Mahesh Waswani for the role of Nigar Begum. The series was her second Hum TV project where she portrayed a challenging role, speaking about her character Nawaz said, "I play a character called Nigar, I really liked this role because it was very challenging and quite different from what I have done up till now ... It was an honour for me to work with Ahsan, as an actor it was a dream come true to work along a man who is so talented and understands his actors so well and gets the best performance out of them".

Apart from primary casting, the production team also finalised several veteran actors for secondary casts. Director Saife Hassan, who regularly directs several series for Hum TV, was finalised to portray the role of Raani's father. The actor had brief appearances in the introduction since he was busy directing Sammi for Hum TV, similarly Actor Noor-ul-Hassan and Actress Kinza Malik were shooting for Sammi but in November 2016 their roles were finished and they were finalised for Alif Allah aur Insaan. Similarly, veteran actor Usman Peerzada was selected to portray the role of Malik Ashar Khan alongside Ainy Zaidi who portrayed Nazneen's mother. Actress Azra Mansoor, previously selected in Diyar-e-Dil and Bin Roye, was finalised to portray the role of Zaitoon, Shahzeb's mother. Actor Qavi Khan was finalised to portray the role of a noble priest who had brief appearances within the play. Farhan Ally Agha was chosen to play Nawazish Ali.

In June 2017, actor Omer Shehzad and actress Nimra Khan joined the leading cast of the series. Speaking about his role, Shehzad said, "Also, my part is very strong, so I’m keeping my fingers crossed ... I’m also coming with a whole new look, I have a moustache, I’m wearing a bracelet in my hand and am always in shalwar kameez, so it’s kind of a wadera look and that’s something I’ve never done before ... I’m also very confident about it because my director told me that this particular character was in line with my presence."

=== Filming, shooting, and location ===
Principal photography commenced on 18 January 2017 and was concluded in June 2017. Later on the same month, the production house ordered more episodes with a new cast. On July, six more cast members joined the shoot and it concluded on 17 November 2017. The eleven-month shooting period marked Alif Allah Aur Insaan as the longest running serial of the 20:00 (GMT) slot on Hum TV. During its filming it had more than average episodes under production and to run it within the 2017 season the production heads decided to release it in April 2017 despite its ongoing shoot. The shooting was finished on 17 November 2017.

Before the shoot, the title of Alif Allah was used, but during the shoot it was changed to Alif Allah aur Insaan. Shooting was extensively done in remote areas of Hyderabad, Sindh and in Punjab areas. All the location units were overseen by Waqar Baloch who was leading the set department which includes Akbar Balouch, Muhammad Jathi Khan and Muhammad Rehman Khan.

Set-location of Nigar Begum's Haveli was a traditional Haveli which was used by the production house for the filming of their 2016 series Mann Mayal for the same channel. Shooting locations were overseen by art director Mirza Zeeshan Baig with cinematographer Zeb Rao and editor Mehmood Ali who returned as director of photography and chief editing respectively. All three of them previously worked with Duraid's Diyar-e-Dil, Mann Mayal, Sanam and Dil Banjaara that earned their skills critical praise and acclaim. Graphics were done by Hasnain Diswali and Syed Furqaan Ali Qazi of Hum TV. Several set locations were real including Nazneen's Haveli and Basit's house. Since the series was also filmed in a Punjab village its few filming locations were real. Actors Mikaal Zulfiqar, Shehzad Sheikh, Kubra Khan, Qavi Khan, Noor-ul-Hassan, Azra Mansoor, Kinza Malik, Usman Peerzada and Ainy Zaidi have mostly filmed in the Punjab region.

== Music ==
Alif Allah Aur Insaan OST

Soundtrack album by Shafqat Amanat Ali
- Released: 19 April 2017
- Recorded: 2017
- Genre: Television soundtrack
- Length: 03 Minutes 12 Seconds (3:12)
- Language: Punjabi
- Label: M.D Productions
- Producer: Momina Duraid

The title song of Alif Allah Aur Insaan was composed by musician Naveed Nashad, while the director Ahson Talish penned the series while the background score for the series was done by Mad Music. The OST was performed by Shafqat Amanat Ali. It marked the return of the singer to Hum TV since performing the channel's hit drama series Alvida's OST in 2015. The OST dominated the fourth position of Top four OST's of 2017 season where Sanam dominated the #1 rank, Rang Dey (of Orangreza) dominated the #2 rank, and Main Hojaoun Na Baaghi (of Baaghi) dominated #3 Rank.

=== Track listing ===
All lyrics are written by Ahson Talish and Ali Raza; all music is composed by Naveed Nashad and Mad Music.

No.	Title	Artist(s)	Length
1.	"Maula Ji"	Shafqat Amanat Ali	3:12
2.	"Unka Gharur"	Rasmia Baloch	2:55
3.	"Mehwar"	Rasmia Baloch	2.40
Total length:			4:52

== Release ==
=== Broadcast ===
Alif Allah Aur Insaan premiered on 25 April 2017 . Alif Allah Aur Insaanl aired a weekly episode every Tuesday succeeding Choti Si Zindagi, starting from its premiere date, with the time slot of 8:00 pm. It was aired on Hum Europe in UK, on Hum TV USA in USA and Hum TV Mena on UAE, with the same timings and premiered date. All international broadcasting aired the series in accordance with their standard times. It was broadcast by Hum Network's new channel Hum World HD for US and Canada. It was also telecast on state channel PTV Home from August 2019 through 2020

=== Home media ===
In late January 2017, Hum Network protected all its episodes from YouTube and the series had no episodes available in the Pakistani region. All episodes of Alif Allah Aur Insaan were available on Hum's official site. But by June 2017, the channel opened their episodes on YouTube once again and as a result all the episodes were available in Pakistan. iflix contracted Hum Network and screened all of Hum TV's Shows after syndication, the series remained the part of the same contract. In August 2019, all episodes were again uploaded by Hum TV on its official YouTube channel but this time the music was muted.

== Reception ==
=== Ratings ===
Number of Episodes	Timeslot (PST)	Premiere			Finale			TV Season	Rank (2017)	Overall viewership (Millions)
Number of Episodes	Timeslot (PST)	Date	Pakistani Ratings (Millions)	Television Rating Points (TRP)	Date	BARB ratings (Thousands)	Television Rating Points (TRP)	TV Season	Rank (2017)	Overall viewership (Millions)
44	Tuesdays; 08:00 pm	13 February 2018	73.7	5.5	TBA	2.86	8.5	2017	No #5	TBA

After Alif Allah Aur Insaan's premier, Hum TV claimed on their Facebook page that they had received the highest rating with Alif Allah Aur Insaan gaining 5.5 TV Rating Points (TRP) leading the 8:00 pm PST / 20:00 GMT time slot just within the pilot episode. On 4 May 2017, Hum TV provided another rating information given by Media Logic and Kantar Media according to which Alif Allah Aur Insaan once again dominated the Tuesday timeslot with a 5.4 TRP on its second episode. The next week, the series received 5 Ratings. On 16 May 2017, there was competition amongst the TV Channels where ‘’Alif Allah Aur Insaan’’ once again dominated the time slot with 4.5 TRP on its fourth episode. Despite facing a 0.5 rating decrease (to last week) the channel still managed to receive the first rank. According to the same source there was a competition with the channel ARY Digital which came in second delivering 2.0 TRP.

On its fifth episode the series once again averaged higher ratings of 5.0 TRP but there was a competition seen where ARY increased to 4.0 TRP. On its sixth episode it increased its TRP reach to 5.1. In June 2017 there was no rating information provided by the channel since it had no transmissions for the month of Ramadan. During the entire month, ARY Digital dominated the top rank with its game show Jeeto Pakistan, followed by Bol News as second rank, Alif Allah Aur Insaan dominated the third rank. On 7 July, Hum TV announced that they had received a 4.5 TRP on average with Alif Allah Aur Insaan's eleventh episode and had also dominated the top rank. With its thirteenth episode the series received its highest ratings of all bringing 7.4 TRPs on average. Whereas on its fourteenth episode it led the Tuesday day slot with 5.9 TRPs on average.

By the end of August 2017, Alif Allah Aur Insaan's' timeslot ranking fell to the fourth position, the Tuesday time slot was then dominated by Ary Digital for three weeks. The series was termed as a drag by the critics and further fell in terms of viewership. However on 9 September, it was announced that the series once again dominated the #1 rank with an average TRP of 4.4 on its twentieth episode. The next week it further increased to a rating of 4.9 on its twenty-first episode, and 4.8 on its twenty-second episode respectively. With its twenty-third episode, the channel saw a boost with Alif Allah Aur Insaan delivering 7.89 ratings with a viewership of 3.3 million. On the twenty-fourth episode Alif Allah Aur Insaan's rating saw another increase of 7.0 TRPs. Despite receiving mixed reviews after twenty-five episodes, Alif Allah Aur Insaan managed to receive 6.1 TRPs on its twenty-sixth episode. On Alif Allah Aur Insaan's twenty-seventh episode Hum TV received a record-breaking rating of 8.6 TRPs leaving behind Ary Digital, Geo TV, Filmazia, and all rival channels. On its twenty-eighth episode Alif Allah Aur Insaan averaged 7.12 TRPs with a viewership of 3.0 Million

On 13 November, a decline of 3.9 TRPs was seen on Alif Allah Aur Insaan's thirtieth episode but despite its decline it still managed to lead the Tuesday 8:00 pm PST / 20:00 GMT time-slot with the #1 rank. Onwards, the same episode in the series began receiving positive reviews once again. Two weeks after its decline, Alif Allah Aur Insaan jumped to the #1 rank again and delivered 7.4 TRPs with a viewership of 2.5 Million on its thirty-second episode, and after the thirty-second episode the series saw a boost in terms of ratings,

It delivered a viewership of 2.5 million with 5.5 TRPs on its thirty-third episode to Hum TV, 4.9 TRPs on its thirty-seventh episode, 5.0 TRPs on its thirty-eighth episode, and 6.2 TRPs on its thirty-ninth episode. The fortieth episode saw another boost for Hum TV as Alif Allah Aur Insaan brought 7.0 TRPs. The forty-first episode delivered 7.8 TRPs and forty-second delivered 8.2 TRPs. The last episode averaged 8.5 TRPs.

=== Episode ranking ===
Alif Allah Aur Insaan episode rankings in the PAK television market
Episode	Timeslot (PST)	TV season	Rank	Viewers (millions)
11	Tuesday 8:00pm	2017	#1	2.54
15	Tuesday 8:00pm	2017	#1	2.32
23	Tuesday 8:00pm	2017	#1	3.33
28	Tuesday 8:00pm	2017	#1	3.05
32	Tuesday 8:00pm	2017	#1	2.57
33	Tuesday 8:00pm	2017	#1	2.55
39	Tuesday 8:00pm	2018	#1	2.68
42	Tuesday 8:00pm	2018	#1	2.86

=== Critical reception ===
The series received mostly positive reviews from critics with praise for its storyline and the cast performances. A reviewer from the Express Tribune criticised it for glamouring the Tawaifs, noting that, "Rather than addressing this issue with a progressive stance," it "glamourised the controversial issue". The News International criticised the unnecessary killing of the characters in the story.

== Accolades ==
Year	Award	Date	Category	Recipient(s)	Result	Ref.
2018	Hum Awards	July 28, 2018	Best Drama Serial - Popular	Momina Duraid	Nominated	
2018	Hum Awards	July 28, 2018	Best Drama Serial - Jury	Momina Duraid	Won	
2018	Hum Awards	July 28, 2018	Best Director Drama Serial	Ahson Talish	Won	
2018	Hum Awards	July 28, 2018	Best Writer Drama Serial	Qaisra Hayat	Won	
2018	Hum Awards	July 28, 2018	Best Actor- Jury	Meekal Zulfiqar	Nominated	
2018	Hum Awards	July 28, 2018	Best Actor - Popular	Meekal Zulfiqar	Nominated	
2018	Hum Awards	July 28, 2018	Best Actress - Popular	Kubra Khan	Nominated	
2018	Hum Awards	July 28, 2018	Best Actress - Popular	Ushna Shah	Nominated	
2018	Hum Awards	July 28, 2018	Best Actor in a Negative Role	Ushna Shah	Won	
2018	Hum Awards	July 28, 2018	Best Supporting Actor - Male	Imran Ashraf	Won	
2018	Hum Awards	July 28, 2018	Best Supporting Actor - Female	Sana Nawaz	Won	
2018	Hum Awards	July 28, 2018	Most Impactful Character	Qavi Khan	Won	
2018	Hum Awards	July 28, 2018	Best Original Soundtrack	Sab tun Uncha Nam Hai Allah by Shafqat Amanat Ali	Nominated	
2018	Hum Awards	July 28, 2018	Best Onscreen Couple - Popular	Kubra Khan & Shehzad Sheikh	Nominated	
2018	Hum Awards	July 28, 2018	Best Onscreen Couple - Popular	Ushna Shah & Imran Ashraf	Won	
2018	Lux Style Awards	February 20, 2018				
2018	Lux Style Awards	February 20, 2018	Best TV Play	Momina Duraid	Nominated	
2018	Lux Style Awards	February 20, 2018	Best TV Director	Ahson Talish	Nominated	
2018	Lux Style Awards	February 20, 2018	Best TV Writer	Qaisra Hayat	Nominated	
2018	IPPA Awards	10 September 2018	Best Actor TV	Meekal Zulfiqar	Won	
2018	IPPA Awards	10 September 2018	Best TV Director	Ahson Talish	Nominated	
2018	IPPA Awards	10 September 2018	Best Supporting Actor TV Serial	Sana Fakhar	Won	
2018	IPPA Awards	10 September 2018	Best Actress TV	Kubra Khan	Nominated	
2018	IPPA Awards	10 September 2018	Best TV Serial	Momina Duraid	Nominated	

== See also ==
- List of programs broadcast by Hum TV
- 2017 in Pakistani television
