= Choti Choti Batain =

Pakistani television anthology series

- Official title card
- Genre: Drama; Mystery drama
- Created by: Shahzad Javed
- Developed by: Shahzad Javed
- Written by: Saima Akram Choudhary, Misbah Nousheen and More
- Story by: Shahzad Javed
- Directed by: Angeline Malik
- Starring: Yumna Zaidi; Zahid Ahmed; Farah Shah; Ushna Shah; Mohsin Abbas Haider; Hina Dilpazeer; Atiqa Odho; Mariyam Nafees; Sukaina Khan; Hajra Yamin; Osama Tahir; Saman Ansari; Sajid Hassan; Kubra Khan; Saima Qureshi; Shehzad Sheikh; Saba Hameed; Gul-e-Rana; Shehryar Zaidi; Ahson Talish; Amar Khan; Muneeb Butt; Mehmood Aslam; Lubna Aslam; Rubina Ashraf; Ghana Ali; Rabya Kulsoom (and many more)
- Country of origin: Pakistan
- Original language: Urdu
- No. of episodes: 25

Production
- Producers: Momina Duraid; Angeline Malik
- Production location: Pakistan
- Camera setup: Multi-camera setup
- Running time: 37 minutes
- Production companies: MD Productions; Angelic Films

Original release
- Network: Hum TV
- Release: 10 March – 6 October 2019

Related
- Kitni Girhain Baaki Hain

Choti Choti Batain (Urdu: چھوٹی چھوٹی باتیں, lit. 'Small Little Things') is a 2019 Pakistani anthology television series, created and developed by Shahzad Javed, Head of Content, HUM TV, co-produced by Momina Duraid of MD Productions and Angeline Malik.

The series is promoted as a collection of different stories for breaking stereotypes prevailing in Pakistani society. Malik earlier announced the title of the series as Inkaar Karo, which was later changed to Choti Choti Batain.

== Premise ==
=== Story - 1 ===
Name	Airing date	No. of episodes	Writer	Director	Cast
Bandhan; lit: Relation	10 March 2019 – 31 March 2019	4	Saima Akram	Angeline Malik	Yumna Zaidi, Zahid Ahmed, Farah Shah

=== Story 2 ===
Name	Airing date	No. of episodes	Writer	Director	Cast
Mujhay Tum Pasand Ho; lit: I Like You	7 April 2019 – 28 April 2019	4	Misbah Nosheen	Angeline Malik	Ushna Shah, Mohsin Abbas Haider, Hina Dilpazeer

=== Story 3 ===
Name	Airing date	No. of episodes	Writer	Director	Cast
Dil Hi Tou Hai; lit:It's my heart	9 June 2019 – 30 June 2019	4	Rida Bilal	Angeline Malik	Atiqa Odho, Mariyam Nafees, Osama Tahir, Hajra Yamin, Sukaina Khan, Saman Ansari

The story explores the life of single parents, and how they feel when their children grow up and get busy with their lives. Saif (Osama Tahir) and Anaya (Hajra Yamin) are a married couple living with Saif's father, Hassan (Sajid Hassan), while Sofia (Atiqa Odho) is the single mother of two daughters, Aliya (Mariyam Nafees) and Neha (Sukaina Khan). Slowly after their children's marriage, Hassan and Sofia realize what they are missing out on: they crave companionship. Both, by fate, meet each other and end up being a couple after a little family drama in both families.

=== Story 4 ===
Name	Airing date	No Of Episodes	Writer	Director	Cast
Kuch To Log Kahengay; lit: People Will Talk	7 July 2019	4		Angeline Malik	Kubra Khan, Shehzad Sheikh, Saba Hameed, Gul-e-Rana, Shehryar Zaidi

=== Story 5 ===
Name	Airing date	No Of Episodes	Writer	Director	Cast
Wajah Tum Ho; lit: You are the reason	5 August 2019	4	Ibn-e-Aas	Angeline Malik	Saheefa Jabbar Khattak, Azfar Rehman

=== Story 6 ===
Name	Airing date	No Of Episodes	Writer	Director	Cast
Roop; lit: Complexion	1 September 2019	5	Parisa Siddiqui	Angeline Malik	Amar Khan, Muneeb Butt, Ghana Ali

The story follows the life of Zeena (Amar Khan) who is a plain looking young woman from a middle-class family in Karachi. Zeena is a sincere worker. She is naive but intelligent. She has faced rejection largely from society simply because of her looks. Zeena somehow lands her dream job at Office. She is appointed as the assistant to Rehaan (Muneeb Butt) and after a rough start soon becomes indispensable at work. She falls in love with Rehaan but keeps her feelings to herself.

== Cast ==
=== Story - 1 (Bandhan) ===
- Zahid Ahmed as Fahad
- Yumna Zaidi as Bisma
- Farah Shah as Salma; Fahad's mother
- Saima Qureshi as Nayla; as Bisma's mother
- Saife Hassan as Nasir; Bisma's father
- Khalid Anam as Raza; Fahad's father

=== Story - 2 (Mujhay Tum Pasand Ho) ===
- Ushna Shah as Pareshay (Pari)
- Mohsin Abbas Haider as Akaash
- Hina Dilpazeer as Akaash's mother
- Shahood Alvi as Akaash's father
- Shermeen Ali as Samiya
- Fazila Qazi as Pari's mother
- Sajid Shah as Pari's father
- Ikram Abbasi as Umair
- Hasan Khan as Shahid

=== Story - 3 (Dil Hi Tou Hai) ===
- Atiqa Odho as Sofia Arif/Sofia Hassan
- Mariyam Nafees as Aliya Raheel
- Sukaina Khan as Neha Waqar
- Hajra Yamin as Anaya Saif
- Osama Tahir as Saif Hassan
- Saman Ansari as Shehnaz
- Sajid Hassan as Hassan Ahmed

=== Story - 4 (Kuch Toh Log Kahenge) ===
- Kubra Khan as Sana
- Shehzad Sheikh as Zain/Guddu
- Saba Hameed as Shaista
- Gul-e-Rana as Guddu's mother
- Shehryar Zaidi as Taimoor
- Ahson Talish as Ahmad

=== Story - 5 (Wajah Tum Ho) ===
- Saheefa Jabbar Khattak as Hania
- Azfar Rehman as Sarim
- Hira Tareen as Nadia
- Tipu Sharif as Tanveer

=== Story - 6 (Roop) ===
- Amar Khan as Zeena
- Muneeb Butt
- Mehmood Aslam
- Lubna Aslam
- Rubina Ashraf
- Ghana Ali
- Rabya Kulsoom
- Sara Razi

== Release ==
The series airs weekly on Hum TV every Sunday evening. It had been hiatus during Ramadan after Mujhay Tum Pasand Ho as the channel ran a transmission the whole day for the first time in years, leaving space for very few serials in a week. It resumed with Dil Hi Toh Hai on 9 June 2019. Each episode of the drama has near one million or at least one million views on YouTube.
