= Shahzad Sheikh =

Pakistani television actor (born 1982)

- شہزاد شیخ
- Born: 26 September 1986 (age 40); Karachi, Sindh, Pakistan
- Education: New York Film Academy
- Occupation: Actor
- Years active: 2011–present
- Height: 180 cm (5 ft 11 in)
- Spouse: Hina Mir (m. 2012)
- Children: 2
- Father: Jawed Sheikh
- Relatives: Momal Sheikh (sister); Behroze Sabzwari (uncle); Saleem Sheikh (uncle); Shehroz Sabzwari (cousin)

Shahzad Sheikh (Punjabi, Urdu: شہزاد شیخ) is a Pakistani television and film actor. He is the son of Pakistani actor, director and producer Jawed Sheikh. He made his acting debut with the television series Dreamers (2011), and has since gained success with starring roles in several successful television series, including the comedy Annie Ki Ayegi Baraat (2012), the teen romance Choti Si Zindagi (2016), the romantic drama Mohabbat Tumse Nafrat Hai (2017), the spiritual drama Alif Allah Aur Insaan (2017), and the romantic dramas Qurban (2017), Tabeer (2018), and Anaa (2019).

Sheikh is also known for playing a troubled Punjabi lover in the comedy telefilm Main Kukkoo Aur woh (2013), a cricketer in the sports drama film Main Hoon Shahid Afridi (2013), and an introvert in the romantic comedy film Karachi Se Lahore (2015), both of which were commercially successful at the box office. In 2021, Sheikh appeared opposite Kinza Hashmi in the comedy telefilm Pyar Mein Blind which released on Eid-ul-Adha. In 2021, he appeared as charming lieutenant commander Hadi in telefilm Hangor S-131. In 2022, he appeared in the freshbreath serial Meray Humnasheen as Dr.Hadi. In 2022, he also made his phenomenal act in Ibn-e-Hawwa opposed Hira Mani and Aymen Saleem on Hum TV.

In December 2022, he appeared in Tere Bina Main Nahi gaining fame alongside Sonya Hussyn and Aiza Awan.

== Early life ==
Sheikh was born to actor Javed Sheikh and his wife, Zeenat Mangi, a housewife. He has a sister, actress Momal Sheikh. He is the nephew of Saleem Sheikh and Behroze Sabzwari and the cousin of Shahroz Sabzwari, all actors. He has spent his early life in Larkana, where he attended primary and secondary school. He later went to the New York Film Academy, in the United States, to attain his degree in method acting and filmmaking.

== Career ==
Sheikh started his acting career from television shows like AAG TV's 2011's Dreamers in which he played the lead role of Mickey along with Ainy Jaffri. In 2012, Sheikh played a lead role of Mikaal Ahmad in Geo TV's series Kis Ki Ayegi Baraat's fourth season Annie Ki Ayegi Baraat along with Naveen Waqar as Annie, and the other cast included Alishba Yousuf, Bushra Ansari, Javed Sheikh, Samina Ahmed, and Hina Dilpazeer. Marina Khan directed the season and was written by Vasay Chaudhry. Sheikh also played another lead in 2012 as Zeeshan in the Geo's serial Mi Raqsam along with Ayeza Khan, Waseem Abbas, and Salman Shahid which Sabiha Sumar directed and written by Kifayat Rodani.

In 2013, Sheikh played a supporting role in Hum TV's Halki Si Khalish along with Javed Sheikh, Mehreen Raheel, and Mawra Hocane. He also played another supporting role in 2013 in the ARY Digital's serial Mere Hamrahi as Aahad, along with Fahad Mustafa and Soniya Hussain in the lead. Furqan Khan directed while Sana Fahad wrote the serial. Sheikh made his film debut the same year, by playing a supporting role of a cricketer Mikaal Qureshi in the sports drama Main Hoon Shahid Afridi opposite Humayun Saeed, Noman Habib, Javed Sheikh, Mahnoor Baloch and Nadeem Baig. The film was directed by Syed Ali Raza Usama and scripted by Vasay Chaudhry, released domestically on August 23, 2013, by ARY Films.

In 2014, he starred in a supporting role in ARY's serial Bhabhi along with Aijaz Aslam and Sohai Ali Abro, which Asif Younus directed and Ghazala Aziz wrote. He played a supporting role in the ARY's Soteli along with Ayesha Khan, Deepak Perwani, and Sabreen Hisbani, directed by Shehrazade Sheikh and written by Seema Ghazal.

Sheikh came on board as the lead in the road comedy film Karachi Se Lahore (2015), directed by Wajahat Rauf and written by Yasir Hussain. Ayesha Omer and Javed Sheikh also starred in the film, which released domestically on 31 July 2015. Sheikh then won the accolades for playing the polite and naive Gulraiz in Mohabbat Tumse Nafrat Hai alongside Ayeza Khan and Imran Abbas Naqvi. Sheikh also played the parallel lead of Shahmir in ARY's Qurban along with Iqra Aziz and Bilal Abbas Khan. In 2018, Sheikh played the lead role of Fawad Azam in the HUM TV's hit drama Tabeer along with Iqra Aziz. This marked his third collaboration with Iqra Aziz. In 2019, he played the lead role of Areesh in Hum TV's Anaa along with Hania Amir, and played the character of Salar in the series Deewar-e-Shab, alongside Sarah Khan, Shehroz Sabzwari, Bushra Ansari. In 2020, he starred as Irtiza in Geo Entertainment series Raaz-e-Ulfat, opposite Yumna Zaidi and Komal Aziz Khan. The series was reviewed positively, and he was praised for his performance. He concluded the year with the Hum TV series Tum Ho Wajah, along with an ensemble cast of Sawera Nadeem, Shahood Alvi, Saboor Aly and Sumbul Iqbal.

== Personal life ==
Sheikh married lawyer Hina Mir on 28 December 2012 in Karachi. According to the actor, they met at a mutual friend's wedding and fell in love at first sight. The couple have two children.

== Filmography ==
Key
†	Denotes film / drama that has not released yet
†	Denotes films / drama that are currently on cinema / on air

=== Films ===
Title	Year	Role	Director	Note
2013	Main Hoon Shahid Afridi	Mikaal Qureshi	Syed Ali Raza Usama	Film Debut
2015	Karachi Se Lahore	Zaheem	Wajahat Rauf	Lead Actor
2018	Wajood	-	Jawed Sheikh	Producer
2021	Hangor S-131	Lt Cdr Haadi	Saqib Khan	Telefilm

=== Television ===
Year	Title	Role	Opposite	Notes
2011	Dreamers	Mickey	Ainy Jaffri	(TV Debut)
2012	Resham Se Resham	Inshal	Humaima Malick	PTV Home
2012	Hum Parinday	Kabeer	Janita Zafar	TV One
2012	Annie Ki Ayegi Baraat	Mikaal	Naveen Waqar	Geo TV
2012	Mi Raqsam	Zeeshan	Ayeza Khan	Geo TV
2013	Teesri Manzil	Sami	Sonya Hussyn	A-Plus TV
2013	Na Mehram	Zain	Ayesha Khan	TV One
2013	Halki Si Khalish	Khurram	Mehreen Raheel	Hum TV
2013	Mere Hamrahi	Aahad	Sonya Hussyn	ARY Digital
2014	Bhabhi	Sarim	Sohai Ali Abro	ARY Digital
2014	Soteli	Mikaal	Sadia Faisal	ARY Digital
2014–2015	Wafa Na Ashna	Waleed	Mansha Pasha, Sidra Batool	PTV Home
2015	Dil He To Hai	Faizi	Sana Sarfaraz	Express TV
2015	Madawa	Baari	Yumna Zaidi	Hum Sitaray
2015	Vasl e Yaar	Asfand	Ayesha Khan	ARY Digital
2016–2017	Izn-e-Rukhsat	Haidar	Sonia Mishal	Geo TV
2016–2017	Choti Si Zindagi	Urwah Ahmed	Iqra Aziz, Nimra Khan, Hiba Bukhari	Hum TV
2017	Khaali Haath	Haisam	Aiman Khan	Geo TV
2017	Mohabbat Tumse Nafrat Hai	Gulraiz Akhtar	Ayeza Khan	Geo TV
2017–2018	Alif Allah Aur Insaan	Basit Ali	Kubra Khan	Hum TV
2017–2018	Qurban	Shahmir Khan	Iqra Aziz	ARY Digital
2017–2018	Ghar Titli Ka Par	Azar	Aiman Khan	Geo TV
2018	Tabeer	Fawad	Iqra Aziz	Hum TV
2018–2019	Khudparast	Hannan	Ramsha Khan	ARY Digital
2019	Anaa	Areesh	Hania Aamir	Hum TV
2019	Choti Choti Batain	Zain (Guddu)	Kubra Khan	Hum TV
2019–2020	Deewar-e-Shab	Salaar	Sarah Khan	Hum TV
2020	Raaz-e-Ulfat	Irteza Hassan	Yumna Zaidi, Komal Aziz Khan	Geo TV
2020	Tum Ho Wajah	Shahab Hussein	Sumbul Iqbal	Hum TV
2021	Phaans	Sahil	Zara Noor Abbas	Hum TV
2022	Ibn-e-Hawwa	Zahid	Hira Mani - Aymen Saleem	Hum TV
2022	Meray Humnasheen	Hadi Shahryar	Hiba Bukhari	Geo TV
2022–2023	Tere Bina Main Nahi	Murtaza	Sonya Hussyn	ARY Digital
2023–2024	Muhabbat Ki Akhri Kahani	Farhad	Alizeh Shah	Express Entertainment
2023–2024	Zulm	Shahvaiz	Sahar Hashmi	Hum TV
2024	Fanaa	Rizwan	Nazish Jahangir	Green Entertainment
2024	Tere Mere Sapnay	Azlaan	Sabeena Farooq	Geo Entertainment
2025	Kaarzar-e-Dua	Raazi	Hina Altaf	Geo Entertainment
2025	Mohalla †	Haider	Maha Hasan	Express TV
2025-26	Muamma	Shah Jahan	Saba Qamar and Sidra Niazi	Hum TV
2026	Rang De	Ahad	Sabeena Farooq	Geo Entertainment

=== Other appearances ===
Year	Title	Role	Notes	Channel
2011	Kitni Girhain Baaki Hain	Feroze Ahmed	Story: Ghulam Gardish	HUM TV
2014	Shareek-e-Hayat	Recurring	Anthology Romantic	HUM TV
2019 –	Darr Khuda Say	Irrfan	Guest Appearance	Geo TV
2020	Prem Gali	Manzoor Ahmed	Guest Appearance	ARY Digital
2025	Paradise	Shahzad	Guest appearance	Express TV

=== Telefilms ===
Year	Title	Role	Opposite
2012	Salaam 2012	Shahrukh	Ainy Jaffri
2012	Family Man	Mikaal	Eshita Syed
2013	Zara Si Aurat	Shahroze	Ayeza Khan
2013	Youn Hum Miley	Awais	Sajal Aly
2013	Sayaa	Shahzad	Ayeza Khan
2013	Eid Wid Pyar Vyar	Ahmed	Alishba Yousuf
2013	Band Bajj Gaya	Ehsan	Sajal Aly
2014	Bhagtee Bareera	Zaid	Sonya Hussyn
2014	Kahin Pol Na Khul Jaye	Farhan	Ayeza Khan
2014	Main Kukko Aur Woh	Ahmad Raza	Ayeza Khan
2014	Arranged Shadi ki Love Story	Shaamil	Aamina Sheikh
2014	Han Qabool Hai	Fahad	Aiman Khan
2014	Lakeerain	Aadil	Rabiya Kazi
2016	Arranged Marriage	Imran	Sonya Hussyn
2016	Phupho Ki Beti	Sikandar	Faryal Mehmood
2016	Aik Aur Phupho Ki Beti	Sikandar	Faryal Mehmood
2017	Loji Love Ho Gaya	Jibran	Rabab Hashim
2017	Principal Nadra 19 Grade	Ali Shan	Sarah Khan, Faryal Mehmood
2018	Rok Sako To Rok Lo	Sultan	Kinza Hashmi
2018	Breakup Ke Baad	Ali	Ushna Shah
2019	Vespa Girl	Asim	Ayeza Khan
2019	Raja Ki Raji	Ayaz Khan	Yumna Zaidi
2020	Bholay Bhalay Saiyan	Salman	Kubra Khan
2021	Garmee	Haider	
2021	Pyar Mai Blind	Ali	Kinza Hashmi
2022	Chand Raat Aur Chandni	Shaami	Alizeh Shah
2023	Neelofer Tsunami	Shariq	Ushna Shah
2023	Mummy Nahin Manain Gi	Saad	Hiba Bukhari
2023	Fakhroo Ki Dulhaniya	Fakhir (Fakhroo)	Madiha Imam
2023	Tamak Toiyan	Mazhar Alam	Sonya Hussyn
2025	Bechara Dil	Umar	Aiza Awan

== Awards and nominations ==
Date	Dramas	Awards	Category	Result
2017	Choti Si Zindagi	5th Hum Awards	Best On-Screen Couple along with Iqra Aziz	Nominated
2018	Alif Allah Aur Insaan	6th Hum Awards	Best On-Screen Couple along with Kubra Khan	Nominated
2019	Tabeer	7th Hum Awards	Hum Award for Best Actor Popular	Nominated
2019	Tabeer	7th Hum Awards	Best On-Screen Couple along with Iqra Aziz	Nominated
2022	Phaans	8th Hum Awards	Hum Award for Best Actor in a Negative Role	Won
