= Fazila Kaiser =

Pakistani actress

- فضیلہ قاضی
- Born: 1967 (age 58–59)
- Occupations: Actress, model
- Years active: 1988–present
- Spouse: Kaiser Khan Nizamani

Fazila Kaiser (née Qazi; Urdu: فضیلہ قاضی) is a Pakistani television actress, producer, writer and chef. She has been a major television personality for over four decades. Once noted as the epitome of Pakistan's traditional "girl next door", Kazi established her reputation in 1988 as a fashion model and entered the drama industry in 1991.

== Early life and education ==
Kaiser's was born in 1967 to Qazi Nazeer Akbar Abassi. She studied at the government School and attended the Urdu Science College and later forwarded for a BA degree from Karachi University.

== Personal life ==
Her husband, Kaiser Khan Nizamani, is also a famous actor, director and producer. They married in 1993 and have two sons.

== Select filmography ==
Year	Title	Role	Channel	Ref
1990	Rozi	Nazia	PTV	
2000	Tipu Sultan	Tajdar Begum	PTV	
2011	Khuda Aur Muhabbat	Baji	Geo TV	
2011	Dareecha		ARY Digital	
2015	Khatoon Manzil	Tasneem	ARY Digital	
2016	Deewana		Hum TV	
2016	Haya Ke Daaman Main	Mahjabeen	Hum TV	
2016	Natak		Hum TV	
2016	Nazr-e-Bad	Nusrat	Hum TV	
2016	Iss Khamoshi Ka Matlab	Salina	Geo TV	
2017	Daldal	Shaheen	Hum TV	
2017	Parchayee	Rehana	Hum TV	
2017	Alif Allah Aur Insaan		Hum TV	
2017	Tumhari Marium		Hum TV	
2017	Ghairat		ARY Digital	
2017	Bay Khudi	Rukhsana	ARY Digital	
2018	Tawaan	Tahira	Hum TV	
2019	Mere Humdam		Hum TV	
2019	Mera Rab Waris		Geo TV	
2019	Choti Choti Batain		Hum TV	
2019	Mere Mohsin		Hum TV	
2019	Sach	Shabana	Hum TV	
2020	Muqaddar	Bilquis, Haris’ mother	Geo TV	
2020	Makafaat		Geo TV	
2021	Rang Mahal		Geo TV	
2021	Wafa Be Mol		Hum TV	
2021	Mohabbat Daagh Ki Soorat		Geo TV	
2022	Dil Awaiz		Geo Tv	
2022	Bhagam Bhag	Sobia Ahmad	ARY Digital	
2022	Thori Sazish Thori Mudakhlat	Razia	Hum TV	
2022	Hasrat		Hum TV	
2022	Tere Bin	Anila Ahmed	Geo Entertainment	
2023	Sirf Tum	Farah Faraz	Geo Entertainment	
