= Jhooti =

Pakistani drama serial by ARY Digital

- Official title card
- جھوٹی
- Genre: Thriller; Romance
- Written by: Ali Moeen
- Directed by: Syed Ramish Rizvi
- Starring: Iqra Aziz; Yasir Hussain
- Country of origin: Pakistan
- Original language: Urdu
- No. of seasons: 1
- No. of episodes: 26

Production
- Producer: Abdullah Seja
- Production location: Pakistan
- Cinematography: Kaleem Hussain
- Camera setup: Multi-camera setup
- Running time: 37-45 minutes
- Production company: Idream Entertainment

Original release
- Network: ARY Digital
- Release: 1 February – 25 July 2020

Related
- Meray Paas Tum Ho; Log Kya Kahenge

Jhooti (transl. Liar) is a 2020 Pakistani television series that premiered on ARY Digital from 1 February 2020. Iqra Aziz plays a leading role with her real-life husband Yasir Hussain playing the main antagonist. Directed by Syed Ramish Rizvi, Jhooti revolves around Nirma who has a habit of lying in order to get whatever she wants. She lies with conviction and never gets caught until karma catches up with.

== Cast ==
- Iqra Aziz as Nirma Akbar : Akbar and Azra's daughter; Ahmed and Majid's sister; Nasir's ex-wife.

- Ahmed Ali Butt as Nasir Manzoor : Manzoor and Zubeida's son; Nirma's ex-husband.
- Asma Abbas as Azra Akbar : Akbar's wife; Ahmed, Majid and Nirma's mother.
- Madiha Rizvi as Zubia Ahmed : Ahmed's wife.
- Yasir Hussain as Ali : Nirma's husband.
- Paras Masroor as Ahmed Akbar : Akbar and Azra's son; Majid and Nirma's brother; Zubia's husband.
- Tauqeer Nasir as Akbar : Azra's husband; Ahmed, Majid and Nirma's father.
- Qasim Khan as Majid Akbar : Akbar and Azra's son; Ahmed and Nirma's brother; Saman's husband.
- Mariyam Nafees as Saman Majid : Majid's wife.
- Shaista Jabeen as Zubeida Manzoor : Manzoor's wife; Nasir's mother.
- Nida Hussain as Zara : Ali's ex friend
- Zahid Qureshi as Manzoor : Nasir's father; Zubeida's husband.
- Syeda Iman Zaidi as Ameen : Nirma's Bestfriend.
- Syed Saim Ali as Hashim : Ali's friend.

== Soundtrack ==
Jhooti

Soundtrack album by Sajjad Ali
- Released: 17 February 2020
- Genre: Television soundtrack
- Length: 4:04
- Language: Urdu
- Label: Ary Digital

Music video
- "OST: Jhooti" on YouTube

The OST is sung and composed by Sajjad Ali on his own lyrics. The music for the series is given by Shabi.

== Reception ==
The first episode of Jhooti got more than 13 million views on YouTube as of July 2024.

=== Accolades ===
Date of ceremony	Award	Category	Recipients	Result	Ref.
November 5, 2021	Pakistan International Screen Awards	Best Supporting Actor	Ahmed Ali Butt	Won	
