= Momal Sheikh =

Pakistani actress and producer (born 1986)

Momal Sheikh Nawaz
- مومل شیخ
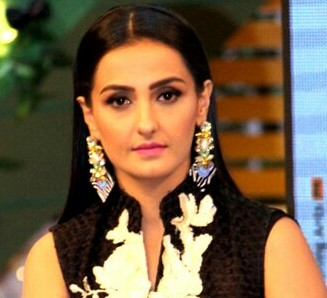
- Momal Sheikh at The Kapil Sharma Show
- Born: April 6, 1984 (age 42); Karachi,Sindh, Pakistan
- Occupation: Actress
- Years active: 2008-present
- Spouse: Muhammad Nadir Nawaz (m. 2012)
- Children: 2
- Parent: Javed Sheikh (father)
- Relatives: Shahzad Sheikh (brother); Behroze Sabzwari (uncle); Saleem Sheikh (uncle); Shehroz Sabzwari (cousin)

Momal Sheikh Nawaz (née Sheikh; Urdu: مومل شیخ) is a Pakistani actress and producer. Her works in serials are Yeh Zindagi Hai in 2008 and Mirat Ul Uroos in 2013. She made her film debut with 2016 film Happy Bhag Jayegi. Sheikh also co-produced 2018 film Wujood with Shehzad Sheikh under her father's production banner Javed Sheikh Films, which features Danish Taimoor and Saeeda Imtiaz in lead.

== Personal life ==
She is the daughter of actor Javed Sheikh and Zeenat Mangi and sister of Shahzad Sheikh, niece of Behroze Sabzwari and Saleem Sheikh and cousin of Shahroz Sabzwari. She is of Punjabi descent from father's side and Sindhi descent from mother's side. She is married to Muhammad Nadir. They have a son named Ibrahim, and a daughter, who was born on 20 August 2020.

== Career ==
She has worked in television serials such as Mirat Ul Uroos on Geo TV. She made her Bollywood film debut with Happy Bhaag Jayegi.

== Filmography ==
=== Film ===
Title	Year	Role	Notes
Happy Bhaag Jayegi	2016	Zoya	Indian Hindi film
Wujood	2018		Producer

=== Television ===
Title	Year	Role	Notes
Yeh Zindagi Hai	2008	Jalebi	
Mirat Ul Uroos	2012	Hamna	
Mujhe Khuda Pe Yaqeen Hai	2013	Areba	
Kadoorat	2013	Alina	
Silsilay	2018	Abeeha	
Khaas	2019		
Yaariyan	2019	Sadia	
Damsa	2019-2020	Saman	
Mushk	2020	Mahak	
Dil-e-Momin	2021	Ashi	
