= Mushk =

2020 Pakistani television series

- Clockwise, from top left: Urwa Hocane, Imran Ashraf, Moomal Sheikh and Osama Tahir
- Urdu: مشک
- Genre: Romance; Serial drama
- Written by: Imran Ashraf
- Directed by: Aehsun Talish
- Starring: Imran Ashraf; Momal Sheikh; Urwa Hocane; Osama Tahir
- Theme music composer: Naveed Nashad
- Opening theme: "Mushk" by Ali Zafar
- Country of origin: Pakistan
- Original language: Urdu
- No. of episodes: 26

Production
- Producer: Momina Duraid
- Cinematography: Nadeem Rahman
- Editor: Syed Tanveer Alam
- Production company: MD Productions

Original release
- Network: Hum TV
- Release: 17 August 2020 – 13 February 2021

Mushk (Urdu: مشک, lit. 'Fragrance') is a Pakistani drama that aired on Hum TV. The actors starring in this show include Imran Ashraf, Urwa Hocane, Momal Sheikh and Osama Tahir. With Imran Ashraf also as the writer, the play is directed by Aehsun Talish. A weekly episode started airing on Hum TV from 17 August 2020.

The show earned widespread critical acclaim for its performances, dialogues, and cinematography, and achieved decent viewership, peaking at 5.1 TRPs. It received nomination of Best TV Actress - Critics' choice for Hocane at the 22nd Lux Style Awards.

== Plot ==
The story starts with Mehak, a girl who is born in a conventional family. Even though she gets a chance to go abroad for further education, that doesn't change the conventional thinking of her family, who wants to get her married as soon as she gets back. Little do they know that Mehak has started a new life out there; she is married and even has a young son who is named Shahmeer. Shahmeer's father is the man Mehak loves, Shayan. While Mehak is enjoying a happy life out there, a man named Adam, who has been in love with her for years, awaits her and lives in Mehak's village. It seems like all he will get is his heart broken.

Mehak's happy family doesn't stay together for long, as on Shayan's visit to Pakistan, he is trapped and locked up by his uncle as he wants Shayan to marry his daughter, but Shayaan doesn't want to marry her as he is already married and there is a large age gap between them. This leads to Mehak coming back to Pakistan in his search. But how can she tell her family that she is married if she is not able to find Shayan? How will she reveal her son?

Fate saves her day by making her meet a poor girl called Guddi who fakes to be the mother of her child and agrees to spend some time in Mehak's haveli as a servant until she finds Shayan. Soon, Mehak has disclosed to Guddi that she went to London and fell in love with Shayan. After some time Shayan had to go back to Pakistan for some reason, but Mehak was worried that he will never come back so she forced him to marry her and he did so.

Once, Guddi abused Mehak's Tai Zulekha and she in return throws Guddi out of the house. This leads to Guddi taking Mehak's son with her to the train station. Mehak asks Adam for help and tells him that Shahmeer is her son. Adam goes to the train station and brings Guddi back. Guddi seeks forgiveness from Tai but in her heart, she wants revenge. Once, Saqib comes to meet Roshni and Guddi, Tai, and Mehak see them. Dada comes and asks who was meeting Saqib. Tai lies to Dada that Saqib came to meet Mehak. Dada on the next day goes to Adam's house and asks him to marry Mehak. After coming back the next day, upon Mehak's plan, Adam agrees.

Their engagement is planned to take place on the same day as Roshni's nikkah, with whom Tai has arranged through her husband's Doctor Sahab. Guddi's vengeance plan is to have Roshni elope with Saqib, so that it would demean Tai's izzat (respect). Roshni escapes on her nikkah day, but Adam and Mehak's engagement take place. Roshni and Saqib arrive at the train station, where they are aided by a man who dwells there.

Meanwhile, Dada is informed that Roshni has actually escaped, and ends up in the hospital after panicking. Adam is sent to find Roshni. Saqib and Roshni are planning their nikkah to finally get married. On the other hand, Shayan now lives as a guest in his Uncle's house to soon marry his daughter but attempts another time to escape. However, when he goes to inform the police about his Uncle, he realizes that the police are also under his control. He is again forced to return to his Uncle's house. Saqib is revealed to be taking revenge for his sister from Roshni's father and dumps Roshni at a woman's house. Adam arrives at the train station and is finally told by the man at the train station about where Roshni is.

== Cast ==
- Urwa Hocane as Guddi
- Imran Ashraf as Adam
- Momal Sheikh as Mehak Shayan
- Osama Tahir as Shayan
- Raja Haider as Dr. Rana
- Sohail Sameer as Sajjad
- Ahson Talish as Muqaddar Khan
- Natasha Ali as Muqaddar Khan's wife
- Syed Mohammad Ahmed
- Zara Tareen as Zulekha
- Hassan Ahmed as Zulekha's husband
- Manzoor Qureshi as Mehak's grandfather
- Raza Talish as Saqib
- Sehar Khan as Roshni
- Qavi Khan as Railway Station porter
- Sami Khan as Munna
- Laiba Shah as Aliya
- Syeda Hurain as Masooma
- Areeba Ali Hamdani as Guriya
- Salma Asim as Adam's mother

== Production ==
Imran Ashraf, who is primarily known as an actor, also wrote the mega-hit tragic drama serial Tabeer a few years back.

In 2019, he returned to writing with Mushk; his second play as a writer that will also feature him in the lead alongside Urwa Hocane. This marks the second writing collaboration he has made with Aehsun Talish who also directed the 2019–20 drama Yeh Dil Mera.

In October 2019, it was announced that Urwa Hocane, last appeared in the network's social-drama Udaari, will make a comeback on TV screens with Mushk alongside Imran Ashraf and the script will be written by Ashraf himself. In the talk show Bol Nights, actress Kubra Khan and actor Gohar Rasheed announced that they were to be part of Mushk, but later dropped due to scheduling conflicts. In turn, Momal Sheikh replaced Kubra and Gohar Rasheed was replaced by Osama Tahir.

The first and second teasers of the show were released on 4 August 2020.

== Soundtrack ==
Mushk OST

Soundtrack album by Ali Zafar
- Released: 9 August 2020
- Recorded: 2020
- Genre: Television soundtrack
- Length: 4:18
- Language: Urdu, Punjabi
- Label: M.D Productions
- Producer: Momina Duraid

Music video
- "Mushk" OST on YouTube

The official soundtrack of the serial has been composed by Naveed Nashad and sung by Ali Zafar while the lyrics are written by Ahson Talish.

== Reception ==
=== Critical reception ===
The show garnered widespread critical acclaim, with particular praise for its cast's performances, dialogues, and cinematography The incorporation of raw Urdu in the dialogues was especially commended. Reviewers from The Nation and DAWN Images lauded the cast's performances, storyline, direction, and script. In a review of the 20 episodes, Intsab Sahi of The News International praised the script for its "charming" characters, the "purposeful" plot and thought-provoking portrayal of various issues, albeit noting that some dialogues were overly philosophical.

=== Audience reception ===
The series received a decent TRPs throughout its run and leading the time slot for first time in its 15th episode by gaining 5.1 TRPs, followed by 4.55 TRPs in 16th episode and 3.7 TRPs in 17th episode.

== Awards and nominations ==
| Date of ceremony | Award | Category | Recipients | Result | Ref. |
|---|---|---|---|---|---|
| October 9, 2021 | Lux Style Awards | Best Female Actor - Critics | Urwa Hocane | Nominated | |
| November 5, 2021 | Pakistan International Screen Awards | Best Television Actor (Jury) | Imran Ashraf | Nominated | |
| November 5, 2021 | Pakistan International Screen Awards | Best Supporting Actress | Zara Tareen | Nominated | |
| November 5, 2021 | Pakistan International Screen Awards | Best Original Soundtrack | Ali Zafar and Naved Nashad | Nominated | |

== See also ==
- List of programs broadcast by Hum TV
