= Dareecha =

- Genre: Horror; Mystery
- Written by: Syed Mohammad Ahmed
- Directed by: Farrukh Faiz
- Starring: Fazila Qazi; Salma Hassan; Sana Askari; Imran Aslam; Yasir Hussain; Sonya Hussyn
- Opening theme: "Galiyaon Pe Chaya Hua Hai" by Jaffer Zaidi
- Country of origin: Pakistan
- Original language: Urdu
- No. of episodes: 103

Production
- Executive producer: Jerjees Seja
- Producer: Adeel Farhan
- Production locations: Karsaz, Karachi
- Cinematography: Shani Ali
- Editor: Waqas Pasha
- Running time: 18–20 minutes(per episode)
- Production company: MContent

Original release
- Network: ARY Digital
- Release: 12 September 2011 – 13 March 2012

Dareecha (Urdu: دریچہ, lit. 'Window') is a Pakistani horror-mystery soap television series that aired during 2011–12 on ARY Digital. It was produced by Abdullah Seja and Jeerjes Seja under Idream Entertainment. It featured Fazila Qazi, Sana Askari, Imran Aslam, Yasir Hussain and Sonya Hussyn in pivotal roles.

== Synopsis ==
The drama focuses on the main character Maheen, who faces many challenges in life due to her love marriage with Faizan. Faizan, a psychologically disturbed man, tortures every woman he marries. In the past he has married 4 other women and harmed them physically and mentally. He plans to do the same to Maheen. Soon after, guided by her sixth sense, Maheen realizes that Faizan's family and past has been impacted by black magic. Furthermore, suspense occurs when Maheen begins to see ghosts of the dead. She must find out Faizan's past and the hidden truths.

== Cast ==
- Fazila Qazi as Geati Aara, matriarch of Bari haveli and Faizan's mother
- Imran Aslam / Asad Siddiqui as Faizan, Geati Aara's son
- Sana Askari as Maheen, Faizan's wife
- Yasir Hussain as Shahrukh, the servant in Geati Aara's house
- Salma Hassan as Roshan Aara, “Bebo Khala”, Geati Aara's younger sister
- Sonya Hussyn as Surraya, Faizan's office employee
- Fawad Khan as Moeen, Faizan's office employee
- Hina Khawaja Bayat as Shamshad Bibi, a female scholar and Geati Aara's friend
- Kaif Ghaznavi as Shamsa Bibi, a scholar
- Adnan Shah Tipu as Abdul Quddus; Maheen's maternal uncle
- Rashid Farooqui as Ejaz, Surraya's father
- Syed Mohammad Ahmed as Iftikhar Shah “Shah Jee”, Geati Aara's deceased husband
