= Deewana (TV series) =

2016 Pakistani TV Series

- Genre: Serial drama; Supernatural drama; Family drama; Romantic drama
- Written by: Adeel Razzaq
- Directed by: Ahson Talish
- Starring: Shehroz Sabzwari; Saba Hameed; Iqra Aziz; Farah Shah; Waseem Abbas
- Opening theme: Singers; Akbar Ali Khan; Beena Khan; Poetry by Siraj Aurangabadi; Qawwali by Fareed Ayaz; Abu Muhammad
- Composer: Naveed Wajid Nashad
- Country of origin: Pakistan
- Original language: Urdu
- No. of seasons: 1
- No. of episodes: 46

Production
- Executive producer: Moomal Shunaid
- Producer: Moomal Entertainment
- Production location: Karachi
- Camera setup: Multi-camera setup
- Running time: 40 minutes
- Production company: Moomal Entertainment

Original release
- Network: Hum TV
- Release: 11 May – 2 November 2016

Deewana (Urdu: ديوانہ; ISO: Dīvānā ; lit: Madman) is a Pakistani television drama series which aired from 11 May to 2 November 2016 on Hum TV. It aired every Wednesday and Thursday at 9:10 pm PST.

== Plot ==
Deewana is the story of two brothers, Subhan (Tariq Jameel Paracha) and Tabrez (Waseem Abbas). The younger brother, Tabrez, considers his older brother a father figure. Subhan Qureshi is married to Shamma (Saba Hameed) and later loses his ability to talk. Tabrez is married to Abdun (Farah Shah). Subhan and Shamma have a son, Shayan, and a daughter, Mehru/Mehr Sultana (Iqra Aziz). Tabrez has a son, Harris (Junaid Akhter), and a daughter, Rabia. Shayan falls in love with Rabia and marries her. One day, Shayan and Rabia fight. She expresses her dislike for Shayan. Shayan grabs his pistol, but Rabia snatches it from him. By the time the rest of the family arrives, Rabia has shot Shayan and committed suicide.

This incident leads to a fight between the two families because Tabrez and his family think that Mehru killed Rabia. However, Tabrez apologizes to Subhan and his wife after a court decision. Shamma does not forgive him, but Subhan does. Mehru and Harris like each other, so Shamma arranges their marriage. To make it even more complicated, Harris was angry with Mehru for shooting his sister, but eventually, they forgive each other. Later, they both get married. Tabrez has decided to take revenge for his daughter's murder on Mehru, so he asks Harris to leave her on their wedding night. Harris was upset that he had to betray his wife like that, but he did so, leaving a note from his father to Shamma telling her that they had taken their revenge. Mehru wakes up and finds the note. She runs after Harris, trying to find him, but cannot; that night, it was also raining heavily. While running, Mehru falls in front of Falak's (Shehroz Sabzwari) cycle, and she faints. Falak carries her to his home. There, he tries to wake her up, but Falak's mother Husn Ara (Hina Bayat) arrives and tells him to take her to her people (humans), as both of them are jinns. Abdun's (Farah Shah) cousin Shabnam (Fazila Qazi) lives near Mehru's house, and she sees Falak bring Mehru back and immediately informs Abdun (Farah Shah) about it.

Falak once again goes to Mehru's house, where he finds her depressed and somehow learns all of her stories. He is fascinated by Mehru and keeps helping her out whenever Mehru is upset, despite Falak's mother expressing her unhappiness and fears about Falak's growing attachment to Mehru. Meanwhile, Falak and Husn Ara are hiding, and Husn Ara is worried because of a jinn (Aly Khan) who wants to marry her and who also murdered her husband, Agha Wali, and became the Agha (head of the jinns' tribe) himself. As it was, Falak was the one who should become the Agha after his father, so Husn Ara watches Falak from a magic mirror because she is worried that Agha would hurt him. Falak often asks her why she fears Agha and never lets him roam around the world free; however, Husn Ara never lets him know because if she knows that if she does, despite looking jolly and angerless, Falak can kill Agha or anyone who has angered him if he is enraged. And she does not want her son to get involved in any such thing and always teaches him to love and forgive. When Agha finds out where Falak and Husn Ara are hiding, he threatens her to come to him; otherwise, he will hurt Falak. Husn Ara gets worried, and Falak finds a way of getting closer to Mehru. As the Mehrus family is going through a crisis, they decide to rent a portion of their house. Shabnam, to get more involved in the family matters. offers Shamma four lakhs' rent for the portion with advance, but Falak arrives in time and offers ten lakhs. Shamma gets confused, but finally, after some questions, gives the portion to Falak. Gaiti Shabnam's cunning and outspoken daughter falls in love with Falak. While Falak, just being friendly, treats her like a friend.

Falak and Mehru become closer as time passes. He takes her to meet Harris in Lahore as Mehru still hopes to reconcile with her husband. However, when Mehru meets Harris, he insults her and her family, causing Mehru to slap him. Leaving Harris shocked, Falak and Mehru leave. That night, for the first time, Falak takes Mehru to his world (the jinn world). Mehru does not understand exactly where she is, but her surroundings enchant her and she finds herself falling in love with Falak. She seems to have finally found happiness and peace.

Falak's mother, Husn Ara, calls Falak back home. Upon reaching home, Mehru develops a high fever and falls into an odd state of unconsciousness. Shamma cannot understand what is wrong with her daughter, and Husn Ara believes this is Falak's doing. When Falak comes to meet Mehru and calls her name, she hears his voice and, strangely and abruptly, wakes from her state of unconsciousness. She runs into his arms, to the astonishment of her family and Husn Ara. She wept and asked him why he brought her back to all this pain when, finally, she was happy with him.

Later, Husn Ara accuses Falak of bringing Mehru under his spell and using his powers to manipulate her emotions. This accusation brings Falak to his knees. In tears, Falak professes to his mother and Shams that he has not cast any spell on Mehru. He is simply and deeply in love with her. He swears that he never influenced her feelings for him. Husn Ara is surprised to hear this declaration, but she believes her son.

With time, Harris becomes estranged from his family, as he discovers he is an adopted child, which is why his parents mourn the death of their daughter so much more. He leaves his family to go back to Mehru but finds that it is too late. Mehru can no longer find a place in her heart for Harris. Concurrently, she is also confused by Falak, who always manages to cheer her up with his antics but does not seem to have clear answers for any of her questions.

In an effort to keep Falak away from Mehru, Husn Ara traps Falak in his room using her powers. Somehow, Mehru manages to enter the room and release Falak although the human eye cannot ordinarily see past such magic. Falak calls it a miracle of their love and is overjoyed to be reunited with Mehru. However, he cannot answer her when she asks him if he intends to marry her once she divorces Harris.

Meanwhile, Harris grows increasingly agitated when Mehru insists she no longer loves him. He barges into her room one fateful night and tries to force himself on her. Falak saves Mehru and throws Harris off her. Mehru is terrified and screams for her mother. Subhan Qureshi, Mehru's father, cannot take the stress of Harris's accusations against Mehru's character and commits suicide. Falak tries to save Mehru's father but his efforts are hampered when Agha intercedes and captures Falak. Falak is now trapped in the jinn world.

Mehru cannot understand what has happened. She is traumatized by her father's death and by everyone accusing Falak of killing him. A moulvi sahib reveals to Mehru and her mother that Falak belonged to the family of jinns. During this time, Harris tries repeatedly to reunite with Mehru, but she cannot seem to forget about Falak and thwarts his advances.

Back in the Jinn world, Husn Ara and Shams save Falak from Agha. He returns to Mehru, just in time to yet again, save her life. Now, when Mehru finally finds out that Falak is not human, she is terrified of him. She asks him how she could ever have loved him if he is not even human. For that, Falak has no answer. He is distressed because it seems he cannot give Mehru what she needs unless he is human. In her dreams, Mehru's father visits her. He gently brings her to terms with her feelings. Her conversation with him makes her realize that her love for Falak is genuine and otherworldly. They complete each other. Falak may not be human, but he resides in her heart.

Falak finds a way to become human. However, in doing so, he can never return to his old world and turn back to his old form. He decides he is ready to leave everything to become human for Mehru. However, Mehru is poisoned by Harris's new wife, Gaiti, before she can truly reunite with a human Falak. And for the first time, Falak is unable to prevent harm from coming from Mehru's way as he is a mere mortal. Falak returns to her, eagerly declares that he is now human for her, only to find Mehru dying.

A distraught Falak carries Mehru outside and runs in the rain. This ending is symmetrical to their first meeting when Mehru met Falak in the rain and bumped into his bicycle. Falak cries for help. The ending is left ambiguous and open for the viewer. We do not know if Mehru survived or if Falak had to be human without her. The ending strikes a chord with the title referring to Falak who was "Deewana" for Mehru without a limit.

Deewana's opening theme speaks about an irrevocable, blind and limitless love. It is the kind of love that supersedes existence. Against all odds, Falak and Mehru defied nature and loved each other just as deeply.

== Cast ==
- Shehroz Sabzwari as Falak (Djinn);
  A jinn of age 500 years and Husnara's son, with a cheerful, impish, and kind personality. He slowly falls in love with Mehru and vows to protect her at all costs.
- Iqra Aziz as Meher Sultana (Mehru);
  Shamma and Subhan's daughter, Rabia's cousin & Shayan's sister, A young woman who actually loves Haris but because of Haris' betrayal she grows to hates him. She befriends the mischievous but loving Falak and eventually falls in love with him.
- Junaid Akhter as Haris;
  A male lead protagonist who is the step-son of Tabrez and Amtul, who betrays Mehru.
- Waseem Abbas as Tabrez
- Saba Hameed as Shamma
- Tariq Jameel as Subhan/Qureshi Sahab
- Hina Khawaja Bayat as Husanara (Djinn mother)
- Waseem Tirmazi as Shayan (Mehru's brother, Tabrez's nephew and son-in-law, Shamma and Subhan's son)
- Farah Shah as Amdun (Harris's mother, Shabnam's cousin)
- Fazila Qazi as Shabnam
- Anita Campher as Chandabi
- Alyy Khan as Agha
- Mizna Waqas as Geti
- Shazia Qaiser as Meher's aunt
- Salma Qadir as Rasheeda (Shabnam's friend)
- Akbar Khan
- Anwar Baloch
- Ahmed Mujtaba
- Tauqeer Ahmed Paul as Shams (Falak's friend)
- Anita Kaneez

== Awards and nominations ==
Year	Awards	Category	Nominee	Result	Ref.
April 29, 2017	Hum Awards	Best Original Soundtrack	Fareed Ayaz & Abu Mohammad; composed by Naveed Wajid Nashad	Nominated	

== See also ==
- List of programs broadcast by Hum TV
- 2016 in Pakistani television
