= Qurban (TV series) =

2017 Pakistani drama serial on Ary Digital

- Title Card
- قربان
- Genre: Drama; Romance
- Written by: Zafar Mairaj
- Directed by: Ahmed Bhatti
- Starring: Iqra Aziz; Bilal Abbas Khan; Shahzad Sheikh
- Theme music composer: Goher Mumtaz
- Opening theme: Sun Sayiaan by Masroor Ali Shah and Goher Mumtaz
- Ending theme: Sun Sayiaan by Masroor Ali Shah and Goher Mumtaz
- Composer: Goher Mumtaz
- Country of origin: Pakistan
- Original language: Urdu
- No. of episodes: 29

Production
- Producer: Abdullah Seja
- Production locations: Karachi, Pakistan
- Editors: Kamran Hashim; Erum Lakhani; Saniya Khan
- Camera setup: Multi-camera setup
- Running time: 37 minutes
- Production company: Idream Entertainment

Original release
- Network: ARY Digital
- Release: 20 November 2017 – 19 March 2018

Qurban (Urdu: قربان, lit. 'Sacrificed') is a Pakistani romantic Drama television series that premiered on ARY Digital on 20 November 2017. The series is directed by Ahmed Bhatti, produced by Abdullah Seja and written by Zafar Mairaj under the banner of IDream Entertainment. It features Iqra Aziz, Bilal Abbas, and Shahzad Sheikh in lead role.

== Plot ==
'Qurban' is a story about Heer, Jamal, and Shahmir, three individuals entangled in an intense love triangle. Heer (Iqra Aziz), is a nice and bright girl hailing from a rich household. She falls in love with a fellow student Jamal (Bilal Abbas Khan) who, although intelligent and hardworking, is extremely poor. Heer idolizes her father, who in turn, dotes on her. She wants to marry someone like her dad, who had gone through struggle and hardship in his life and worked very hard to be a senior Bureaucrat. Heer finds this level of dedication and hard work in Jamal and falls in love with him. Jamal is scared that Heer's family will not accept him, so he does not profess his love to her, but finally, after seeing that Heer will not give up on him, he tells her that he is also in love with her.

Through twists and turns in the plot, it is revealed that Heer's marriage has already been decided since she was two months old, to a boy named Shahmir. Shahmir is from her father's village, the grandson of the woman who brought her father up when his family died in a storm. Heer takes Jamal to her parents so he can ask for her hand in marriage when he is settled, but Heer's father tells her to ask him to leave. Heer's father tries to break the engagement on Heer's request, but then is reminded that "respect" is the most important thing in the world to the people of the village. He forces Heer to marry Shahmir.

Heer is disappointed and upset with her father, as she believed her father would do anything for her. A headstrong Heer goes and marries Jamal. No one knows about this nikkah except Heer's friend Mishal and two of Jamal's co-workers. Heer plans to run away with him, but Jamal decides to take her back home to request her parents again with the nikkah certificate, because running away didn't feel right to him. Before leaving, Jamal goes to the mosque to pray while Heer sits outside and awaits him. Shahmir's older brother who had been following her all this time, finds the opportunity and kidnaps her and takes her to his home and threatens to not mention anything and to be nice to the whole soon to be in-laws.

Not being able to find Heer, Jamal reaches Heer's home. Heer's father is so angry to see Jamal that he gets the police force to arrest him and beat him up. After being beaten up and released, Jamal has a car accident and a temporary memory loss. Heer searches for him and even tells her mother that she has married Jamal and cannot marry Shahmir but she does not believes Heer, thinking she is just making excuses so as to not marry Shahmir.

Heer is left with no choice. She thinks Jamal has left her and taken advantage of her. She has no idea about the accident. Heer finally marries Shahmir; meaning Heer is stuck in a double nikkah.

Shahmir is initially rude to Heer, but soon Heer finds out Shahmir has a girlfriend. Shamir opens up to Heer, and they decide to become 'just friends'. Heer has given up on life and is destined to her fate.

Meanwhile, a nurse named Marium takes care of Jamal because she falls in love with him. She keeps him at her house with her fellow nurse. She nurses him back to health and helps him find Heer. Jamal learns from Heer's family that she's married, upsetting him. After some struggles, Jamal eventually finds Heer, but an extremely distraught and emotional Heer tells Jamal that she cannot be with him. Her father will die if she brings the family shame.

Jamal leaves for his village. Shahmir's girlfriend breaks up with him after finding out that he's married. Shahmir then wants to make it work with Heer. But Heer is hellbent on getting a divorce from Jamal who is nowhere to be found. Shahmir and Jamaal meet, and Shamir asks Jamaal to accept Heer since they both love each other. Upon hearing this, Jamaal figures that Shahmir loves Heer more than he does himself. He leaves, and Heer calls Jamaal to meet. The next day when they do meet, it is revealed that they were being followed by Shahmir's elder brother, who is angry seeing Jamaal and Heer together. It is also shown that Shahmir is present in the area. Shahmir's brother ends up shooting Jamaal more than once and shoots Heer on the shoulder. Shahmir hears gunshots and runs to where Jamaal and Heer were. He sees his brother firing shots, he pushes him out of the way and before fainting, Heer sees a glimpse of Shahmir holding the gun. Shahmir in shock and despair, turns himself in to the police saving his brother. Jamaal dies from his injuries and Heer recovers. She files a report against Shahmir, but it is revealed to her that it was his brother who actually shot both Jamaal and Heer. Shahmir's brother, embarrassed, shoots himself in the head and dies.

After her recovery, Heer decides to move to Jamaal's village and live with his mother. Jamaal's mother calls Shahmir to the village to marry Heer. She gives the couple her blessings and they leave to their home to start afresh.

== Cast ==
=== Main ===
- Shahzad Sheikh as Shahmir Khan, he is the second husband of Heer who despite being against the marriage earlier, falls deeply in love with her.
- Bilal Abbas Khan as Jamal, he is the first husband and former love interest of Heer
- Iqra Aziz as Heer Shahmir Khan, who sacrifices her love for Jamal and marries for the sake of her family but as fate would have it falls in love with her husband.

=== Other Cast ===
- Laila Wasti as Shehla, mother of Heer
- Rehan Sheikh as Shafi Mohammad, father of Heer, he was raised by Amma Ji after his parents died in a flood
- Shamim Hilaly as Amma Ji mother-in-law of Heer and grandmother of Shahmeer, she has a dominating personality, conniving in nature, and forces her family members to follow her decisions
- Yashma Gill as Maryam the nurse who helped Jamal; she secretly loves Jamal
- Omair Rana as Qaiser Khan. He pressures Heer's parents to have her marry Shameer. He is narrowminded. He is responsible for Jamal's death.
- Humaira Zahid as Zubaida, Heer's aunt and kind person.
- Fahima Awan as Shehnaz, Shahmir's sister and a sweet person.
- Ayesha Toor as Rabia, Heer and Shahmir's aunt

== Broadcast ==
The series is originally broadcast on ARY Digital and also rerun on ARY Zindagi in Pakistan. Broadcasting for the series in other Countries are listed below.

Country	Title	Network
Arab World	أجل من الحب	MBC Bollywood
Somaliland	Jaceyl Dartiis	HCTV
Pakistan	قربان	ARY Zindagi; ARY Digital

== Awards and nominations ==
Year	Award	Category	Recipient(s)	Result	Ref.
2019	ARY Digital- Social Media Drama Awards 2018	Best OST	Qurban	Nominated	
2019	ARY Digital- Social Media Drama Awards 2018	Best Script Writer	Zafar Mairaj	Nominated	
