= Choti Si Zindagi =

2016 Pakistani TV series

- Official title screen
- Genre: Family drama; Serial drama; Romantic drama
- Written by: Sarwat Nazir
- Directed by: Shaquille Khan and Adeel Qamar Khan
- Starring: Iqra Aziz; Shahzad Sheikh; Nimra Khan
- Opening theme: Choti Si Zindagi by Nabeel Shaukat Ali and Sara Raza Khan
- Country of origin: Pakistan
- Original language: Urdu
- No. of seasons: 1
- No. of episodes: 28

Production
- Producer: Momina Duraid
- Production locations: Karachi; Multan; Sahiwal
- Camera setup: Multi-camera setup
- Production company: MD Productions

Original release
- Network: Hum TV
- Release: 27 September 2016 – 18 April 2017

Choti Si Zindagi (Urdu: چھوٹی سی زندگی; ISO: Chōṭī-sī Zindagī ; lit:A short life) is a Pakistani drama serial that was first aired on 27 September 2016 on Hum TV, replacing Zara Yaad Kar. It stars Iqra Aziz, Shahzad Sheikh and Nimra Khan in lead roles. It is directed by Shaquille Khan but after 24 episodes the drama was then directed by Adeel Qamar Khan. The drama was highly rated.

== Plot ==
The series is set in the late 1970s, a period in which early and arranged marriages were common. It centers on Urwa, an engineering student, and Amina, a young girl whom he is compelled to marry under family and societal pressure, as well as Azra, Urwa’s college sweetheart.

Urwa (played by Shahzad Sheikh) is in love with his classmate Azra (played by Nimra Khan), who reciprocates his feelings. Their relationship is discovered by Urwa’s father, who disapproves and forces Urwa into an arranged marriage with his cousin Amina (played by Iqra Aziz), a 15-year-old girl who is immature, inexperienced, and unfamiliar with household responsibilities. Following the marriage, Urwa treats Amina poorly, teasing her and frequently arguing with her. His mother assigns Amina household tasks she does not know how to perform, though over time Amina gradually learns domestic skills and earns her mother-in-law’s affection.

Urwa returns to college without informing Azra of his marriage and continues to communicate with her, though increasingly distantly. During a vacation at home, he notices Amina’s emotional and personal growth and begins to develop feelings for her. After receiving a letter from Azra, Urwa returns to Karachi, where he finally tells her about his marriage. Azra subsequently leaves for England.

As Urwa progresses through college, he takes a part-time job following news of his father’s impending retirement. He moves into a rented flat with his best friend Sohail, who is aware of Urwa’s circumstances. There they meet their neighbor Saqia, who becomes infatuated with Urwa and attempts to ingratiate herself by bringing him food. Concerned that Urwa lacks proper care, his father sends Amina to live with him at the flat. Saqia mistakenly assumes Amina is a housemaid, leading to misunderstandings and jealousy. Tensions escalate as Saqia openly flirts with Urwa, resulting in frequent arguments between Urwa and Amina. Eventually, Urwa sends Amina back to her parents’ home.

Amina’s distressed parents contact Urwa’s father, who confronts his son and persuades him to reconcile. Amina later becomes pregnant, but due to illness she stays with her parents, and Urwa remains unaware of the pregnancy until he learns that their son, Ali, has been born. After completing his engineering degree, Urwa struggles to find stable employment. Financial strain and the demands of caring for their child place further stress on the marriage, particularly as Amina’s attention focuses on their son. Over time, their situation improves, and they later have a daughter as well.

As their children reach school age, the family again faces financial difficulties, which are alleviated with assistance from Sohail, who has become wealthy. Urwa eventually moves with Amina and their children to Saudi Arabia for work. Years later, after their children have grown into adults, Urwa encounters Azra once more and reflects on his past. He rejects her renewed interest, affirming his commitment to Amina. The series end with Urwa playing with his grandson.

== Cast ==
- Iqra Aziz as Amina
- Shahzad Sheikh as Urwa
- Nimra Khan as Azra Riaz
- Farah Shah as Zubaida Irfan
- Tahira Imam as Sakina Furqan
- Afraz Rasool as Sohail Bhatti
- Rashid Farooqui as Irfan
- Hiba Bukhari as Saiqa
- Shehryar Zaidi as Riaz Ahmed
- Khalid Butt as Nizami Sahab
- Mubshira Khanum as Syka's grandmother
- Bilawal Firdous as Ali (son of Urwa & Ameena)
- Alizeh Shah as Alina (daughter of Urwa and Ameena)
- Rimha Ahmed
- Ramha Khan
- Kiran Qureshi
- Umair Butt
- Sohail Maqsood
- Neelum Gul
- Asma Saif
- Raham Rala as Syka's mother
- Tiram Rala
- Rahira Khan

== Nominations ==
Award	Category	Recipient(s) and nominee(s)	Result	Ref(s)
5th Hum Awards	Best Actress	Iqra Aziz	Nominated	
5th Hum Awards	Best Drama Serial	Choti Si Zindagi	Nominated	
5th Hum Awards	Best On-Screen Couple	Iqra Aziz and Shahzad Sheikh	Nominated	

== See also ==
- List of programs broadcast by Hum TV
- 2016 in Pakistani television
