= Ghairat =

- غیرت
- Genre: Drama; Romance; Crime
- Written by: Edison Idrees Masih
- Directed by: Ahmed Bhatti
- Starring: Iqra Aziz; Muneeb Butt; Syed Jibran
- Country of origin: Pakistan
- Original language: Urdu
- No. of seasons: 1
- No. of episodes: 26

Production
- Producer: Abdullah Seja
- Production company: Idream Entertainment

Original release
- Network: ARY Digital
- Release: 24 July – 13 November 2017

Ghairat (Urdu: غيرت, lit. 'Honour') is a Pakistani television series which aired on ARY Digital. It features Iqra Aziz and Muneeb Butt in lead roles with Syed Jibran as the antagonist. Premiering on 24 July 2017, Ghairat ended its run on 13 November 2017 after 24 episodes. The story of the series revolves around Honour Killing.

== Synopsis ==
The story revolves around Saba (Iqra Aziz). She has lived a sheltered life within the constraints of patriarchal norms. Saba finds a teacher and a friend in her elder sister Iqra (Jinaan Hussain). In a tragic turn of events, their elder brother Usman (Syed Jibran) burns Iqra alive in the name of honour. Saba, who held deep respect for Usman as his elder brother who she thought couldn't even harm a fly, now sees him in a completely different light. She grows up the day she sees her sister engulfed in flames and grows out of many ideals she had grown up with.

== Cast ==
- Iqra Aziz as Saba
- Muneeb Butt as Zohaib
- Jinaan Hussain as Iqra; Saba's sister
- Syed Jibran as Usman; Saba and Iqra's brother
- Saman Ansari as Shagufta; Usman's wife
- Samina Ahmad as Saba's mother
- Faizan Sheikh as Adnan
- Fazila Kaiser
- Saad Qureshi as Kashif
- Aqeel Abbas as Shagufta's Brother
