= Shahroz Sabzwari =

Pakistani actor and model

- شہروز سبزواری
- Born: 25 August 1985 (age 40); Abu Dhabi, United Arab Emirates
- Occupations: Model, actor
- Spouses: Syra Yousuf (m. 2012; div. 2020) Sadaf Kanwal (m. 2020)
- Parent: Behroze Sabzwari (father)
- Relatives: Jawed Sheikh (uncle); Shahzad Sheikh (cousin); Momal Sheikh (cousin)

Shahroz Sabzwari (Urdu: شہروز سبزواری; born 25 August 1985) is a Pakistani actor and model who is known for his role in the film Khulay Aasman Ke Neechay directed by Javed Sheikh. He played the lead role in the 2016 television drama series Deewana produced by Hum TV.

== Personal life ==
He married actress Syra Yousuf on 21 October 2012 and their Nikkah took place in Karachi in a private ceremony. They announced their separation on 29 February 2020. They later announced their divorce. On 31 May 2020, Sabzwari married model Sadaf Kanwal.

== Filmography ==
=== Films ===
Year	Film	Role	Notes	Ref(s)
2008	Khulay Aasman Ke Neechay	Saleem	Debut film	
2017	Chain Aye Na	Rayyan	Main lead	
2023	Babylicious	Omar	Main lead	
2025	Qulfee	Xulfee	Main lead	
TBA	Kolachi	Akbar	Post-production	

=== Television ===
Year	Serial	Role	Channel	Notes
2004	Ana		Geo TV	Acting debut
2004	Maamta		PTV	
2006	Kuch Dil Ne Kaha	Naveed	Geo TV	
2006	Karachi High		ARY Digital	
2008–2013	Yeh Zindagi Hai	Sheroz	Geo TV	
2010	Don't Jealous		TV ONE	
2010–11	Parsa	Shahrukh	Hum TV	
2011	Badtameez		ARY Digital	
2012	Vanee		Geo TV	
2012–2013	Tanhaiyan Naye Silsilay	Shamsuddin Altamash	ARY Digital	
2013–2014	Billo Bablu Aur Bhaiyya	Bilal/Bablu	ARY Digital	
2013	Nanhi	Shahid	Geo TV	
2013	Dard-e-Ashna		A-Plus TV	
2014	Kahani Raima Aur Manahil Ki		Hum TV	
2014	Bhool	Shazan	Hum TV	
2014	Aahista Aahista	Mustafa	Hum TV	
2014–2015	Shareek-e-Hayat		Hum TV	Episode 2 (Is Bhool Ki Maafi Nahin)
2014–2015	Khata	Romi	ARY Digital	
2015–2016	Maana Ka Gharana	Khizer	Hum TV	
2016	Deewana	Falk/Adam	Hum TV	
2016	Pasheman	Taimoor	Express TV	
2017	Shikwa Nahi Kisi Se		A-Plus TV	
2017	Teri Raza	Rameez	ARY Digital	
2017–2018	Begangi	Omar	A-Plus TV	
2017–2018	Zard Zamano Ka Sawera	Meer	ARY Digital	
2018	Seep	Bilal	TV ONE	
2018	Kyunke Ishq Baraye Farokht Nahi	Mustafa	A-Plus TV	
2018	Ghar Jamai	Iqtedar	ARY Digital	
2018	Bisaat e Dil	Shahnawaz	Hum TV	
2018	Aangan	Dr. Ehsaan	Hum TV	
2019	Juda Na Hona	Sudais	TVOne	
2019	Deewar-e-Shab	Khayyam	Hum TV	
2019	Hasad	Armaan	ARY Digital	
2020	Dil Ruba	Junaid	Hum TV	
2020	Nand	Saqib	ARY Digital	
2022	Teri Rah Mein	Ahmar	ARY Digital	
2022	Yeh Ishq Samajh Na Aaye	Shahaan	AUR Life	
2022	Dil-e-Veeran	Talal	ARY Digital	
2022-2023	Hook	Shaheer	ARY Digital	
2023	Khel	Sarim	Hum TV	
2025	Mubarakan Mubarakan	Sarmad	Aur Life	
2025	Pehli Barish	Mehran Behzad (Maani)	Geo TV	
