= Aehsun Talish =

Pakistani TV director

Ahsan Talish
- Born: Ahson Agha Ali Abbas; 10 July 1965 (age 61); Lahore, Punjab, Pakistan
- Occupations: Actor, director, producer
- Years active: 1985–present
- Children: Raza Talish
- Parent(s): Nasreen Shamsa(mother); Agha Talish (father)

Aehsun Talish (Urdu: احسن تالش) is a Pakistani television director, producer, and actor. He has worked in many successful television dramas. Ahson has directing a number of hit television serials, such as Deewana (2016), Alif Allah Aur Insaan (2017), Daldal (2017), Tabeer (2018), Suno Chanda (2018), Suno Chanda 2 (2019), and Yeh Dil Mera (2019). For directing the comedy series Suno Chanda, he received a nomination for the Lux Style Award for Best Director.

== Early life and education ==
Talish was born on 10 July 1965, in Karachi, Sindh, to Agha Ali Abbas Qizilbash, a character actor popularly known as known as Agha Talish, and Umrao Jaan, a homemaker. He is married to Tasniem Talish, with whom he has a son, actor Raza Talish.

Ahson was an aeronautical engineering cadet in PAF College Sargodha. Later leaving the air force he started his career in 1985 as an actor and started as a director after the death of his father, by establishing a production company in his father's name, Agha Talish Productions, in 1998.

== Television series ==
Year	Title	Director	Actor	Producer	Lyricist	Network
1996	Aahan		Yes			PTV
1999	Number 26		Yes			PTV
1999	Chandpur Ka Chandoo	Yes				PTV
2000	Lunch	Yes				PTV
2002	Chamak	Yes				PTV
2003	Raakh	Yes				ARY Digital
2004	Hum Sub Umeed Se Hain	Yes		Yes		Geo TV
2004	Aik Zindagi			Yes		ARY Digital
2005	Tobha	Yes				Geo TV
2006	Neeli Chatri			Yes		ARY Digital
2006	Umrao Jan-e-Ada		Yes			Geo TV
2007	Aitraaf	Yes				Geo TV
2007	Wilco	Yes				PTV
2007	Dost	Yes				ARY Digital
2008	Bina	Yes				ATV
2009	Mohabbat Karney Walay	Yes				Hum TV
2009	Dil Ko Manana Aaya Nahin	Yes				PTV
2010	Koi To Baraye	Yes				ARY Digital
2011	Mere Sapno Ki Rani	Yes				Hum TV
2013	Phir Se Meri Qismat Likh De	Yes				Hum TV
2013	Numm	Yes				Geo TV
2014	Takkabur	Yes				A-Plus TV
2014	Paras	Yes				A-Plus TV
2015	Takabur	Yes				A-Plus TV
2015	Ailaan	Yes				Hum TV
2016	Deewana	Yes	Yes			Hum TV
2016	Gumrah		Yes			Hum TV
2016	Daldal		Yes			Hum TV
2017	Alif Allah Aur Insaan	Yes			Yes	Hum TV
2018	Tabeer	Yes	Yes			Hum TV
2018	Suno Chanda	Yes			Yes	Hum TV
2018	Choti Choti Batain (segment)		Yes			Hum TV
2019	Suno Chanda 2	Yes				Hum TV
2019	Yeh Dil Mera	Yes			Yes	Hum TV
2019	Pyaar Kahani	Yes				Hum TV
2020	Mushk	Yes			Yes	Hum TV
2021	Sinf-e-Aahan		Yes			ARY Digital
2021	Aye Musht-e-Khaak	Yes			Yes	Geo TV
2022	Chauraha	Yes				Geo TV
2023	Sukoon		Yes			ARY Digital
2024	Bismil	Yes			Yes	ARY Digital
2025	Sher	Yes				ARY Digital
2025	Sharpasand	Yes				ARY Digital
2026	Mirza Ki Heer	Yes				ARY Digital

== Awards and nominations ==
Year	Ceremony	Category	Project	Result
2018	17th Lux Style Awards	Best TV Director	Alif Allah Aur Insaan	Nominated
2019	18th Lux Style Awards	Best TV Director	Suno Chanda	Nominated
