= Hum Awards =

Entertainment Industry awards in Pakistan

- Current: 10th Hum Awards; 2025; Pending: 11th Hum Awards; 2026
- Hum Award statuette
- Native name: انعامات ہم
- Awarded for: Excellence in television, film and music achievements
- Country: Pakistan
- Presented by: Hum Network Limited
- First award: 2013
- Website: humawards.com

Television/radio coverage
- Network: Hum TV

Hum Awards are annual Pakistani entertainment awards presented by Hum Network Limited to recognise achievements in Pakistani television, fashion and music. The awards were launched in 2013 and are broadcast by Hum TV. The first ceremony was held at the Karachi Expo Centre in March 2013, with awards presented in television, fashion and music categories.

The ceremony has been staged in Pakistan and internationally, including in Dubai, Canada, Houston and London. Since its launch, major winning dramas have included Shehr-e-Zaat, Zindagi Gulzar Hai, Sadqay Tumhare, Diyar-e-Dil, Udaari, Yaqeen Ka Safar, Suno Chanda, Dar Si Jaati Hai Sila, Parizaad, Fairy Tale and Ishq Murshid.

== History ==
Hum Network announced the awards in 2013 as an annual awards programme for Pakistani television, fashion and music. The initial format included jury-selected awards and viewer-voted categories. The first ceremony was held at the Karachi Expo Centre in March 2013, with awards presented in television, fashion and music categories. Shehr-e-Zaat won Best Drama Serial at the ceremony.

Several ceremonies of the annual awards were later held outside Pakistan, beginning with the 3rd Hum Awards in Dubai in 2015. Sadqay Tumhare was the most awarded drama of the ceremony, winning ten awards, while Bunty I Love You won Best Serial Jury. At the 4th Hum Awards in 2016, Diyar-e-Dil won both Best Drama Serial and Best Drama Serial Jury.

The 5th Hum Awards took place in Lahore in 2017. Udaari won both the popular and jury awards for Best Drama Serial, while Sang-e-Mar Mar also received multiple awards. The 6th Hum Awards were held in Canada in 2018, where Yaqeen Ka Safar was among the major winners. The 7th Hum Awards were held in Houston in 2019, with Dar Si Jaati Hai Sila and Suno Chanda among the major drama winners.

After the 2019 ceremony, the next edition was held in Canada in 2022. Parizaad was the major winner at the 8th Hum Awards. The 2022 ceremony also drew criticism because it was held during the 2022 Pakistan floods. Hum TV later held a fundraising gala in Toronto for flood relief and rehabilitation efforts.

The 9th Hum Awards were held at OVO Arena Wembley in London on 28 September 2024 and covered achievements from 2022 and 2023. The 10th Hum Awards were held at NRG Arena in Houston on 11 October 2025.

== Ceremonies ==
Ceremony	Date	Best Drama Serial	Best Drama Serial Popular	Host(s)	Venue	Ref.
1st Hum Awards	12 March 2013	Shehr-e-Zaat	—	Mahira Khan; Mikaal Zulfiqar	Karachi Expo Centre, Karachi	
2nd Hum Awards	29 March 2014	Zindagi Gulzar Hai	Zindagi Gulzar Hai	Mikaal Zulfiqar; Sanam Saeed	Karachi Expo Centre, Karachi	
3rd Hum Awards	9 April 2015	Bunty I Love You	Sadqay Tumhare	Sanam Jung; Hamza Ali Abbasi	Dubai World Trade Centre, Dubai, United Arab Emirates	
4th Hum Awards	23 April 2016	Diyar-e-Dil	Diyar-e-Dil	Sanam Jung; Hamza Ali Abbasi; Ayesha Khan	Karachi Expo Centre, Karachi	
5th Hum Awards	29 April 2017	Udaari	Udaari	Mikaal Zulfiqar; Nadia Khan; Hareem Farooq	Lahore	
6th Hum Awards	28 July 2018	Alif Allah Aur Insaan	Yaqeen Ka Safar	Ahmed Ali Butt; Bushra Ansari; Ali Rehman Khan; Yasir Hussain	FirstOntario Centre, Hamilton, Ontario, Canada	
7th Hum Awards	5 October 2019	Dar Si Jaati Hai Sila	Suno Chanda	Ali Rehman Khan; Mikaal Zulfiqar; Sanam Jung; Ayesha Omar; Bushra Ansari; Ahmad Ali Butt	NRG Arena, Houston, Texas, United States	
8th Hum Awards	24 September 2022	Parizaad	Parizaad	—	FirstOntario Centre, Hamilton, Ontario, Canada	
9th Hum Awards	28 September 2024	Sang-e-Mah	Fairy Tale	Ahmad Ali Butt; Ahad Raza Mir; Ahmed Ali Akbar; Ramsha Khan; Yumna Zaidi	OVO Arena Wembley, London, England	
10th Hum Awards	11 October 2025	Zard Patton Ka Bunn	Ishq Murshid	Hamza Sohail; Dananeer Mobeen; Hareem Farooq; Mohib Mirza; Yasir Hussain	NRG Arena, Houston, Texas, United States	

== See also ==
- Lux Style Awards
- International Pakistan Prestige Awards
- List of Asian television awards
- List of fashion awards
