= 2022 in Pakistani television =

The following is a list of events affecting Pakistani television in 2022. Events listed include television show debuts, and finales; channel launches, and closures; stations changing or adding their network affiliations; and information about changes of ownership of channels or stations.

During the year two new "General Entertainment" channels were introduced. "Aur Life HD" launched its transmission during the first quarter of 2022 whereas another channel, Aan TV was launched in October 2022.

== Television shows ==
=== Programs debuting in 2022 ===
==== Reality shows ====
S.No.	First aired	Title	Network	Source
1	20 August	Tamasha	ARY Digital	
2	15 October	The Ultimate Muqabla	ARY Digital	

==== Dramas ====
S.No.	First aired	Title	Network	Source
1	3 January	Teri Rah Mein	ARY Digital	
2	9 January	Sang-e-Mah	Hum TV	
3	10 January	Inteqam	Geo Network	
4	12 January	Ishq Pagal Karay	TV One	
5	17 January	Jugnu	Express TV	
6	24 January	Tum Kahan Jao Gy	Express TV	
7	24 January	Aitebaar	Hum TV	
8	24 January	Naqqara-e-Khuda	TV One	
9	24 January	Yeh Na Thi Hamari Qismat	ARY Digital	
10	7 February	Beqadar	Hum TV	
11	8 February	Ibn-e-Hawwa	Hum TV	
12	8 February	Mein Aisi Kiun Hun	Express TV	
13	16 February	Aujhal	Aur Life HD	
14	17 February	Socha Na Tha	Aur Life HD	
15	18 February	Dil E Benaam	Aur Life HD	
16	20 February	Yeh Ishq Samajh Na Aaye	Aur Life HD	
17	21 February	Roag	Hum TV	
18	1 March	Badshah Begum	Hum TV	
19	2 March	Badzaat	Geo Network	
20	7 March	Angana	ARY Digital	
21	10 March	Dil Zaar Zaar	Geo Network	
22	3 April	Paristan	Hum TV	
23	3 April	Hum Tum	Hum TV	
24	3 April	Chaudhry and Sons	Geo Network	
25	21 March	Aik Sitam Aur	ARY Digital	
26	28 March	Haseena	APlus TV	
27	6 May	Saaya Season 2	Geo Network	
28	6 May	Meray Humnasheen	Geo Network	
29	6 May	Dil Awaiz	Geo Network	
30	7 May	Bichoo	Hum TV	
31	9 May	Us Ne Chaha Tha Chand	PTV Home	
32	9 May	Pyar Deewangi Hai	ARY Digital	
33	9 May	Nehar	Hum TV	
34	10 May	Hoor Pari Noor	Express TV	
35	10 May	Habs	ARY Digital	
36	11 May	Rasm-e-Ulfat	PTV Home	
37	11 May	Hasrat	Hum TV	
38	11 May	Kaisi Teri Khudgarzi	ARY Digital	
39	14 May	Fraud	ARY Digital	
40	26 May	Dushman	PTV Home	
41	27 May	Mor Moharan	TV One & PTV Home	
42	31 May	Choraha	Geo Network	
43	7 June	Dil-E-Veeran	ARY Digital	
44	9 June	Pehchaan	Hum TV	
45	11 June	Zakham	Geo Network	
46	15 June	Dil Bhatkay	TV One Global	
47	19 June	Inaam-e-Mohabbat	Geo Network	
48	22 June	Wehem	Hum TV	
49	17 July	Bakhtawar	Hum TV	
50	23 July	Mushkil	Geo Network	
51	27 July	Woh Pagal Si	ARY Digital	
52	8 August	Antul Hayat	Hum TV	
53	10 August	Daraar	Geo Network	
54	11 August	Baarwan Khiladi	Express TV	
55	18 August	Guddu	Geo Network	
56	18 August	Bikhray Hain Hum	Hum TV	
57	29 August	Wehshi	Hum TV	
58	3 September	Wabaal	Hum TV	
59	5 September	Siyani	Geo Network	
60	16 September	Kala Doriya	Hum TV	
61	22 September	Meri Shehzadi	Hum TV	
62	26 September	Tinkay Ka Sahara	Hum TV	
63	6 October	Pinjra	ARY Digital	
64	8 October	Betiyaan	ARY Digital	
65	10 October	Taqdeer	ARY Digital	
66	14 October	Qalandar	Geo Network	
67	25 October	Bepanah	Hum TV	
68	26 October	Agar	Hum TV	
69	31 October	Zindagi Aik Paheli	Geo Network	
79	31 October	Farq	Geo Network	
71	7 November	Noor	Express TV	
72	8 December	Aik Thi Laila	Express TV	
73	8 December	Mere Damaad	Hum TV	
74	12 December	Mujhe Pyaar Hua Tha	ARY Digital	
75	19 December	Muqaddar Ka Sitara	ARY Digital	
76	21 December	Hook (2022 TV series)	ARY Digital	
77	27 December	Tere Bina Mein Nahi	ARY Digital	
78	28 December	Tere Bin	Geo Network	
