= Dobara (TV series) =

Pakistani television series

- Title Card
- Genre: Drama; Romance
- Written by: Sarwat Nazir
- Directed by: Danish Nawaz
- Starring: Hadiqa Kiani; Bilal Abbas Khan
- Country of origin: Pakistan
- Original language: Urdu
- No. of episodes: 33

Production
- Producer: Momina Duraid
- Production locations: Karachi, Pakistan
- Camera setup: Multi-camera setup
- Running time: 39 minutes
- Production company: MD Productions

Original release
- Network: Hum TV
- Release: 20 October 2021 – 15 June 2022

Dobara (Urdu: دوبارہ, lit. 'Again') is a Pakistani television series produced by Momina Duraid under banner MD Productions, directed by Danish Nawaz and written by Sarwat Nazir. It broadcast on Hum TV from 20 October 2021 to 15 June 2022. It features Hadiqa Kiani as Mehrunisa who gets a chance to relive her life after the death of her dominating husband when she comes across Maahir, a carefree and jobless bachelor, played by Bilal Abbas Khan. It also features Usama Khan, Nabeel Zuberi, Zoya Nasir, Sakina Samo, Sabeena Syed and Maheen Siddiqui in supporting roles.

At 22nd Lux Style Awards, it received a nomination for Best TV Actress - Critics' choice for Kiani and won Best TV Actor - Critics' choice for Khan.

Dobara generated highest TRP of 8.8 and did well in terms of TRP.

== Synopsis ==
When her husband Hidayatullah dies in his early seventies, Mehrunissa feels like a free spirit and recalls the bitter memories of her past when her dying father decided to marry her off at 16 years of age to Hidayatullah, who was around 40 at the time. At the time of her husband's funeral Mehrunissa does not seem emotionally affected by his death. Maahir is from a lower middle-class family with broken family and abnormal childhood.

== Cast ==
- Hadiqa Kiani as Mehrunnisa "Mehru" Maahir : Hidayatullah's widow; Maahir's wife; Affan and Minal's mother.
  - Prerna Bajaj as Mehru (young)
- Bilal Abbas Khan as Maahir Jahangir: Mehrunnisa's second husband; Naheed and Jahangir's son; Asfar, Izzah and Madiha's half brother.
- Usama Khan as Affan Hidyatullah: Hidayatullah and Mehrunnisa's son; Minal's brother; Sehar's husband.
- Maheen Siddiqui as Minal Zameer: Hidayatullah and Mehrunnisa's daughter; Affan's sister; Zameer's wife.
- Sabeena Syed as Sehar Affan: Affan's wife; Ghazal and Mubarak's daughter
- Nabeel Zuberi as Zameer Ahmed: Minal's husband
- Zoya Nasir as Narmeen: Maahir's ex lover
- Sarah Nadeem as Nayyara: Mehru's friend and confidant
- Angeline Malik as Naheed Anwar: Jahangir's ex wife; Anwar's wife; Maahir and Anwar's mother
- Shabbir Jan as Jahangir: Maahir, Izaah and Madiha's father; Naheed's ex husband; Adeela's husband
- Fareeda Shabbir as Adeela Jahangir: Jahangir's wife; Maahir's stepmother; Izaah and Madiha's mother
- Amber Khan as Ghazal: Sehar's mother; Mubarak's wife;
- Raja Haider as Mubarak: Sehar's father; Ghazal's husband
- Salma Asim as Narmeen's mother
- Mojiz Hasan as Babar
- Nauman Ijaz as Hidayatullah: Mehru's husband; Minal and Affan's father; Durdana and Farzana's brother(only in flashbacks)
- Aurangzeb Leghari as Mehru's father (only in flashbacks)
- Sakina Samo as Durdana Ehtesham: Hidayatullah and Farzana's sister
- Javed Sheikh as Ibtisam: Durdana's brother-in-law
- Hira Umer as Nadia: Zameer's ex-girlfriend

== Production ==
The project was first announced on 8 July 2021. Osman Khalid Butt was first approached to portray the leading role of Maahir, however due to his other commitments he could not do it. Later, Bilal Abbas Khan was cast in the role. With Khan, singer-turned-actress Hadiqa Kiani was selected to portray the other leading role. It marked her second series after her debut in poetic-romance Raqeeb Se. She revealed in an interview that Mehru [Dobara] is her attempt to break some norms as an actor regarding age.

== Reception ==
=== Television rating ===
It led the rating charts for its 6th episode with 6.2 trps. It again led the slot in 11th episode by achieving 6.5 trps. The 13th episode of the serial received ratings of 7.2 TRPs. 15th episode received 6.7 TRPs. The 16th episode saw a boost and it led the slot with 7.6 TRPs. The 17th episode saw another boost and the serial achieved the whopping 8.8 TRPs. 25th episode received 6.1 TRPs. In the month of Ramadan, Dobara was continuously leading its slot with 5-6 TRPs and became No 1 drama of the week. After Ramadan, it received tough competition from rivals but still managed to receive decent ratings of 4-5 TRPs and ended on 6.5.

=== Critical reception ===
Critically, the series received acclaim for its storyline and performances especially for the performance of the lead cast. In an initial review of the series by Gaitee Ara Saiddiqi of The News International, the series was praised for its unconventional storyline, relatable characters, and strong performances, but the typecasting of Sakina Samo was critiqued. DAWN Images lauded its diversified and plot and strong narrative against the societal stereotypes. Maliha Rehman of Dawn gave mixed reviews to its narrative stating, "Most of the time, Dobara is narrated with great sensitivity and attention to detail." Afreen Seher of the DAWN Images criticised the series for prioritizing wealth over its intended romantic storyline, reducing the protagonist's worth to her possessions, but appreciates its initial attempt at a refreshing narrative featuring a middle-aged woman remarrying a younger man by choice.

With the introduction of false allegations of sexual harassment, social media users criticized the script. Due to weak characterization of the male lead, the series' conclusion received mixed reviews from social media users.

== Accolades ==
| Year | Ceremony | Category | Recipient | Result | Ref(s). |
|---|---|---|---|---|---|
| 2023 | Lux Style Awards | Best TV Actress - Critics' choice | Hadiqa Kiani | Nominated | |
| 2023 | Lux Style Awards | Best TV Actor -Critics' Choice | Bilal Abbas Khan | Won | |
