= Sinf-e-Aahan =

2021 Pakistani television series

- Opening title card
- صنف آہن
- Genre: Drama; Action
- Showrunner: ARY Digital
- Written by: Umera Ahmad
- Screenplay by: Umera Ahmed
- Directed by: Nadeem Baig
- Creative director: Nadeem Baig
- Starring: Sajal Aly; Kubra Khan; Yumna Zaidi; Ramsha Khan; Syra Yousuf (See Full Cast)
- Narrated by: Kubra Khan
- Composer: Asim Azhar
- Country of origin: Pakistan
- Original language: Urdu (Note: Sinhala, Balochi, Pashto, English are the minor languages in the series.)
- No. of seasons: 1
- No. of episodes: 23 (List of Episodes)

Production
- Executive producers: Samina Humayun Saeed; Sana Shahnawaz
- Producers: Humayun Saeed; Shahzad Nasib
- Production locations: Pakistan Military Academy, Pakistan
- Cinematography: Zaib Rao
- Camera setup: Multi-camera setup 1080p
- Running time: 35 minutes
- Production companies: Next Level Entertainment; Six Sigma Plus; Inter Services Public Relations

Original release
- Network: ARY Digital
- Release: 27 November 2021 – 7 May 2022

Sinf-e-Aahan (Urdu: صنف آہن, romanized: Sinf-ē-Āhana, lit. 'Women of Steel') is a Pakistani television series co-produced by Next Level Entertainment and Six Sigma Plus in collaboration with ISPR. It is directed by Nadeem Baig and written by Umera Ahmad. The serial stars Sajal Aly, Kubra Khan, Yumna Zaidi, Ramsha Khan and Syra Yousuf.

Sinf-e-Aahan is the story of seven girls from different backgrounds whose lives change after joining the army. The serial aired weekly on Saturday on ARY Digital from 27 November 2021 to 7 May 2022. It was the ninth most searched term in the category of 'Movies & TV' on Google in Pakistan, in 2022.

== Plot ==
Six girls from different backgrounds and walks of life abandon routine female duties to achieve something greater than themselves and the expectations of their families by responding to their country's call to duty. Though all are extremely competent both academically (all having been educated to Masters Level) and socially, they find that there is more to life than what the world thinks of women to be. Taking it upon themselves to go through all the trials and tribulations that constitute the forging of an army officer, we see how they are transformed from soft rose-petal-like shy timid girls to Women of Steel Sinf-e-Aahan as the name suggests by going through the same rigours and furnaces as their male counterparts in order to stand shoulder-to-shoulder with men in the service of their nation.

=== Episodes 1 - 5 ===
The story begins as we see the main characters enter the stage. Arzoo Daniel is a Catholic girl from Youhana Bagh neighbourhood of Lahore who lives with her parents, two sisters and brother in a relatively hostile area where girls are jeered at and ridiculed. They live on rent in a house owned by Naurez's family. Naurez and Arzoo like each other. Second, Mahjabeen Mastaan – an Overseas Pakistani businessman's aristocratic minded daughter who has nothing but fashion on her mind, but idolizes the great women of Pakistan who have made their mark in the country's history, especially Lt. Gen. Nigar Johar. She has a very strained relationship with her parents and spends most of her time out with friends. She is very close to one of her cousins Kumail and the latter sees her as a possible life partner. Third, Pariwesh Jamal, the daughter of a labouring farmer under the yoke of the local landlord who has kept her father's land on mortgage against a loan with which Jamal has educated his daughter to Masters Level. Fourth, Rabia Safeer, an upper middle class pampered girl who aspires to do something else with her life apart from baking and entertaining guests, some of whom come for her hand in marriage, Fifth, Shaista Khanzada a Pakhtoon from Waziristan who is an artist. She joins the army to run away from home (especially from the grasp of her Hitler-like grandmother), but her fiancé cousin, Kaamil who has a soft corner for her, is always protective of her. Sixth, Syeda Sidra Batool, the comic member of the group who seemingly joins the Army to ‘Have a Good Time.’ The first 5 episodes open the canvas to show how each of these girls breaks the chains of normal ‘girl life’ and goes through the rigours of the Pakistan Armed Forces selection process and meet for the first time at their nearest Inter-Services Selection Board Testing Centre. At their selection, each is overjoyed to run away from home. At the ISSB selection centre, as these girls spend close to 5 days under close evaluation for their physical, mental and psychological skills, each of them discloses their strengths and weaknesses in the personality interview. At the end of the 5 days at the ISSB selection centre, our six main characters receive their appointment letters and, due to them all being post grads in their respective field of study, they are inducted directly at the rank of Captain.

As each of these six girls arrives at the Pakistan Military Academy (PMA), they say goodbye to their parents and family members. Jamal comes to drop Pariwesh but is afraid of his daughter's future, as his landlord's son Subuk is also at PMA and (to Jamal's thinking) Subuk may be a hindrance to Pariwesh's career. To settle this, the Commandant consoles Jamal and meets the landlord to congratulate him on giving permission for Pariwesh to join Pakistan Army. This increases the respect the landlord has in his heart for Jamal and Pariwesh.

As the story now moves for the first time to Kandy, Sri Lanka, we see our 7th main character, Nathmy Pereira (Yehali Tashiya Kalidasa) as she comes home from Lankan Military Academy with a ‘letter of attachment’ with Pakistan Military Academy (PMA). Nathmy's mother is overjoyed at this news that her daughter is going to follow in her father's footsteps by going for training with PMA. As Nathmy thinks of her possible future there, her mother removes from her closet a much treasured memory of Nathmy's father's days at PMA with a photograph of Nathmy's father, Lankan Army Officer Tehaan Pereira and his platoon mates with (especially his best friend) Mujahid Saleem. Her mother also hands over an item of Mujahid Saleem's personal possession which needs to be returned to him (if Nathmy gets a chance to meet him – that is). During this time, Nathmy has been polishing her command over the Urdu language so as to feel comfortable during her time in her second home.

=== Episodes 6 - 10 ===
The beginning of Episode 6 continues in Kandy, Sri Lanka, where Nathmy Pereira who is selected for attachment to Pakistan Military Academy (PMA), an institution which is in no way alien to her, to her father and to the Republic of Sri Lanka from where cadets have been inducted for several years into PMA is preparing to leave for Pakistan. We are told that Nathmy's father trained at PMA. We see Nathmy prepare for her departure to PMA, as do all the other six girls. We also get to know that Nathmy's father, Tehaan Pereira had a dear friend from his days at PMA (Col. Mujahid Saleem) and who served with him during the Sri Lankan Army's joint coalition with Pak Army against the LTTE during 2008-2009 Terrorist Attacks, in which Nathmy's father was martyred.

Our attention turns to a new cast member who joins to head the battalion command of the ladies wing at PMA - SSG Commando, Major Usama, and his wife, Kiran and their daughter. As Nathmy arrives in Pakistan, she receives a warm welcome by the representatives of Pak Army who are to escort her from Islamabad International Airport to PMA Kakul, Abbottabad. All Lady Cadets arrive at PMA and are heartily welcomed at the inaugural gala dinner where Nathmy meets a young Gentleman Cadet (GC) Shehryar, who relates his family link to the Sri Lankan culture and Sri Lankan Army via his father (later to see that he is the son of the same Col. Mujahid Saleem who was Nathmy's father's comrade in the Pak - Lankan Military coalition against the LTTE.) While all other lady Cadets marvel at the facilities, Mahjabeen is not amused. The mere thought of being tied down by rules immediately ignites an inner hostility against PMA's system, and she vows to run away the moment any pressure of compliance is placed upon her. Suddenly Mahjabeen sees Rabia's brother who was once her love interest, but chooses to ignore him. When the lady Cadets (LCs) enter the company lines, their luggage is checked and all useless stuff is instructed to be sent back home. This meant that all flashy lady-like makeup / dresses / paraphernalia brought by Mahjabeen and spiritual items like amulets, rosaries, and talismans and the like brought by others were all impermissible.

The girls’ first company 'fall-in' left a lot to be desired and it was clear that this LCs batch would require the equivalent of a mountain to be climbed. For issues ranging from attitude, agility, stamina, mental tuning, motivation and overall military bearing, they had a long road ahead of them. It was clear that the next six months for them would be nothing short of ‘hell on earth’. The LC's ‘iron tough’ platoon commander Maj. Samia (real Maj. Samia Rahman) is seen in her private life as a tender mother of an ailing son, thus revealing the other side of her personality. The girls console each other as they are all home-sick and even wipe each other's tears. As Maj. Usama takes command of the LCs unit, he remembers his own days at PMA with his best friend Capt. Taimur.

At the early morning PT drill and 'fall-in', the girls are introduced to a literal meaning and paraphrase of each couplet in the Pakistan National Anthem to make their sense of commitment to their country even stronger. We are made to witness the beginning of the many rigours that these ‘rose petal- like’ flimsy girls would require in order to turn them into ‘Women of Steel’. At the end of each tough day they take turns in massaging one other's bruises and blisters. We are shown some of the mischief that the girls get up to – being girls. Major Usama watches the girls going through their drills and as they grunt, whimper and moan during which his mind wanders back to his own days along with Taimur. We see Usama's wife's own flashbacks of her first marriage with Usama's best friend Taimur. Pariwesh's father Jamal gets into trouble as his landlord finds out that without his permission, Jamal sent his daughter to enrol in the Pakistan Military Academy, but then the landlord, is internally glad at Jamal's desire for progress. At the end of the first week each LC writes a letter home which their department will dispatch.

=== Episodes 11 – 15 ===
As each of the LCs write to their parents and family members, we – the viewers get a good insight to how good or otherwise their communication is with their families. For example, Mahjabeen who perhaps was writing to her parents for the first time, made not only her parents cry but also the viewers about how life - as she knew it - has turned on its head as she learned for the first time perhaps – what it means to be a complete Pakistani with purpose in life. By now the rest of the platoon have been able to understand that there is a strong sense of bad blood between Rabia and Mahjabeen, and they all in their own way try to ease the tension between the two. Meanwhile, Kiran's friend discusses with her husband possible reasons for the change in Kiran's manner after the death of her first husband Taimur. Shaista Khanzada, the second LC, writes to her grandma about her experiences and how she has become the disciplined young woman her grandma and parents wanted her to be. As the girls platoon change roommates, Nathmy moves in with Rabia who figures out that Nathmy can not only understand Urdu but can speak Urdu to considerable proficiency (because Nathmy's father served with the Pakistan Army and in turn taught her and her mother). The other LCs now are at ease in communicating with Nathmy in Urdu. As Rabia writes home to her brother, she shares the fact that no matter how strong she ever becomes after being trained by PMA, she will always remain his baby sister who is afraid of mice, and gets upset about the fact that the ladies may only get to serve Pak Army in support services – not in the front line combat zones or on the battlefield.

As Usama watches the LCs during their drill again, and he thinks back to all the goof-ups he and Taimur used to be involved in, and that he too found the training at PMA unbearable at times. When we see Pariwesh writing home, she mentions more of her aspirations once she becomes a full-fledged soldier, the fact that she will send her salary home to pay off the mortgage on her father's land instead of using it. She tells her father that all the lessons of rifle shooting and marksmanship which she learnt as a child are now coming in handy. As the LCs are at the shooting range, Nathmy holding her rifle thinks back to when her father returned from PMA and taught her how to fire a pistol. Her present ability to wield a weapon and use it made her think back to when her father lay mortally wounded, shouting for her to hand over the pistol – but she stood there frozen, and watched him being shot to death as he lay on the ground and also that (had her father been alive today) he would have indeed marvelled at her abilities and achievement.

Usama notices Kiran melancholy and in grief, but Kiran refuses to share the pain of Taimur's death and to discuss anything with him in that regard. In sympathy, all Usama can do is wait till she is ready to open up to him. Yet Kiran takes pride in watching Usama become the father to her daughter that she always wanted Taimur to be. The LCs get ready for a speech competition and Pariwesh is petrified, but Mahjabeen helps her to prepare. Arzoo writes home to tell her family that now she is old enough to uphold the household financial responsibilities. She has now found her life's objective: to not marry her landlord's son, Naurez.

The LCs go for their first assessment – the marching and saluting test. All LCs pass the test except Mahjabeen. All successful LCs are permitted to go home for the mid-term break after the assessment. Rabia asks the platoon commander for permission to take LC Nathmy home with her to Islamabad during the mid-term break. As Nathmy is an overseas cadet, prior approval is required from the Sri Lankan embassy, after which Nathmy is allowed to exit the grounds of PMA. Gladly, the Sri Lankan Embassy agree to allow Nathmy to leave the PMA grounds during vacations. Mahjabeen is heartbroken at her failure to perform and is determined to pass in the next attempt. As Pariwesh goes home, she and Jamal see the landlord awaiting his son, only to find out that GC Subuk has failed his marching and saluting test. Pariwesh request the landlord to return her father's land if she pays the mortgage from her salary. The landlord says nothing but is surprised at Pariwesh's sense of dignity and integrity, which he really admires. Shaista is picked up by her cousin and fiancé Kaamil to whom she requests to release her from her engagement commitment in return for the love he has for her, so that she can concentrate wholeheartedly on her Army career.

Arzoo beats up a bunch of hooligans in her neighbourhood showing that she doesn't tolerate crap from anyone. Nathmy is warmly welcomed at Rabia's house and she has a good time. Arzoo shows Naurez that she has better commitments with life than a marriage with him and tries to break off all links. As Usama, Kiran and their daughter go for a walk, she thinks about Taimur and how she wanted to be the wife of a commando to live in the most posh of Army neighbourhoods. Little did she know that her wish would one day come true after marrying Major Usama (who is an SSG Commando). Rabia and Nathmy go shopping and she bumps into her ex fiancé, Captain Nasar, who Nathmy beats up thinking he is a street mugger. Mahjabeen passes her marching and saluting test and goes home. When her car breaks down she shows her folks she can fix a car too. Naurez comes to Arzoo's house to attempt a patch up but she breaks up any remaining links by asking him to leave. Mahjabeen's friend Kumail also notes the change in her and is happy. Taimur's mother comes to visit Usama and Kiran and she treats Usama as if he was her own son. Kiran shares her grief with her ex-mother-in-law and the old woman in her wisdom tells her that she is the widow of one national hero and the wife of another. She should shed no tears or else no soldier will ever muster the courage to lay down his life for his country. Nathmy explores the Northern Areas of Pakistan towards Gilgit, Gilgit-Baltistan. As it is time for the LCs to go back to PMA, they all get ready to say goodbye to their families and loved-ones. While coming to say ‘goodbye’ to Mahjabeen, Captain Nasar confronts Mahjabeen for lying to him about Rabia that she is a ‘Bi-polar disordered patient’ thereby breaking up their engagement.

=== Episodes 16 – 20 ===
Taimur's mother at dinner with Usama, Kiran and their daughter Mahnoor, sees how the girl stresses on the importance of having salad more than the meal itself and it reminds her that Taimur was exactly the same – so his daughter is a ‘chip off the old block’. Every time anyone mentions Taimur (even if it is his mother), Kiran breaks out into tears and thus she tells Usama not to mention Taimur in front of her to his mother, to which Usama says that no one can stop a grieving mother from talking about her martyred son. Room-mates change again at PMA and this time Mahjabeen is paired up with Rabia. Now every time Rabia and Mahjabeen face each other, flashbacks emerge referring to the reason behind their fall out as friends. We are told that since a very long time Rabia had in her mind Mahjabeen (who was her best friend since childhood) as a perfect life partner for her elder brother - SSG Commando Capt. Daniyal, and it appeared very evidently that Daniyal and Mahjabeen were headed exactly towards this. However, once as Rabiya went to Mahjabeen's house, she overheard Mahjabeen talking to her cousin Kumail about how much he loves her. That changed Rabia's decision and she decided that if someone else likes Mahjabeen, then maybe matchmaking her for Daniyal wouldn't be a good idea, so without telling Mahjabeen, Rabia's family found another suitable match for Daniyal. Mahjabeen found out when she saw the engagement invitation cards. Of course, Mahjabeen felt betrayed and heartbroken, because no matter how aristocratic Mahjabeen was, she would cherish the idea of being her best friend's sister-in-law. So Mahjabeen in revenge made up a phoney story that Rabia was under medical treatment for ‘Bi-polar Disorder’ and she is not suitable for her cousin Capt. Nasar who was already Rabia's fiancé. Consequently Nasar, after making a decision purely on rumour and hear-say, broke up the engagement.

Four LCs are selected for the upcoming adventure course which includes mountaineering and paragliding. These are Rabia, Sidra, Arzoo and Nathmy. Rabia, Sidra and Arzoo go to the platoon commander and try to bail out of the course by giving the names of three replacement LCs. The platoon commander shuns their request and sends them off to prepare for the exercise. Sidra thinks it to be her last few hours alive, bids farewell to her comrades. After the adventure course, Naurez calls Arzoo and threatens her that if she doesn't resign from PMA and come back to the way things were before, then he will destroy her credibility by telling PMA that she has illicit relations with neighbourhood boys and would send photos of himself and Arzoo to support a fake claim. This worries Arzoo but she can't talk about this to anyone. On the next platoon exercise, Mahjabeen violates certain rules and codes of conduct and loses a part of her rifle. She is on the verge of being dismissed from PMA (as this is her third and final warning) just when Rabia finds the missing piece of Mahjabeen's rifle, consequently saving her career. Mahjabeen vows to repay this kindness with honour, but Rabia couldn't care less after what Mahjabeen has done by splitting up her and Nasar. After the field exercise, the disturbed Arzoo confides in her platoon commander and turns in her resignation from PMA rather than trash the credibility of PMA by her plight. But Major Samia refuses Arzoo's resignation and after discussing this issue with Major Usama, they decide to call Naurez to PMA and sort out this issue face to face. Naurez thinks that Arzoo has accepted his terms and comes to meet Arzoo at PMA. There Major Usama catches Naurez by the scruff of the neck and warns him against harassing Arzoo and her family or else be ready to face a prison sentence for attempted assault and mental torture. He takes Naurez's cell phone full of his and Arzoo's personal photos (and informs him that the data will be erased and the phone will be dispatched back to him by courier) and then throws him out through the gates of PMA. Maj. Usama and Maj. Samia assure Arzoo that they are willing to go to all lengths to assist her, as she is a valuable asset to the PMA.

Kiran watches a distraught Usama coming back from PMA and asks him what happened to which he doesn't reply. Usama thinks it is time for him to have a heart-to-heart talk with Kiran about Taimur whether she likes it or not. He relates the entire story of the last military campaign in which he and Taimur were action on the battlefront together, and how having been shot in the chest by terrorists, he died in Usama's arms, requesting him to take care of his family as a gesture of his love and friendship for him. After hearing this, Kiran is convinced of Usama's commitment to her and she lays her arms around him.

Finally come the days of the Annual PMA rifle shooting contest. After each failing shooter is dismissed, the third day begins with only two champions – Subuk (Pariwesh's Village landlord's son) and Pariwesh herself. After Pariwesh wins the contest, Subuk tells his father (the village landlord) that Jamal's daughter Pariwesh is in every way superior and better at rifle shooting than himself and that she and her family deserve honour and respect. When the LCs return home after the rifle shooting contest, the village landlord visits Jamal's house to meet Pariwesh. The landlord praises Pariwesh and returns the ownership deed of Jamal's land back to Pariwesh as a symbol of the respect and honour she has gained in his eyes. He also rewards her with an assault rifle as a gift.

After coming back home, Rabia talks to her brother about what could have been (the match between Daniyal and Mahjabeen and also the one between Nasar and herself) and says that life has gone too far forward and it is not possible to turn back the clock. On the other side, Shaista - seeing the good in her cousin Kaamil, re-affirms their engagement and the two smile at each other.

=== Episodes 21 – 23 ===
The LCs now embark on their final big exercise training mission called ‘Exercise Annihilation’ in which they are to put into practice and implement all gained theoretical knowledge as if they were on a real military combat mission. An overall test of physical and mental endurance, teamwork and sense of responsibility and motivation are to be closely evaluated and intensively tested. They take turns in cooking, guard duty, security and vigilance and of course shooting and destroying stationery and moving targets. As they are deeply involved in each exercise, all what they learned at PMA comes into play including camouflage, stealth and espionage skills. During one of their navigation exercises Nathmy seemingly goes missing and, unknown to her platoon, she falls down a steep hill and injures herself. While lying there, helpless and unable to move, she remembers how her father Tehaan Pereira must have felt during the last moments of his life. Unable to bear the pain of her injury she passes out. Meanwhile the entire platoon go out in search of Nathmy, along with the Pakistan Army searchlight helicopter. Daring to go down that steep grassy hill, Arzoo finds an unconscious Nathmy while the rest of the platoon including Maj. Samia and Maj. Usama follow and who call for the air ambulance to carry Nathmy by stretcher on to the air ambulance and straight to Abbottabad CMH. The intensity of Nathmy's back injury required her to take rest for a few days. During this time, as a surprise from Maj. Usama and Maj. Samia, she is visited in hospital by the one person she has been wanting to meet for more than ten years – her father's wartime comrade, Col. Mujahid Saleem. Her delight to meet him was indescribable and they talked as though they were father and daughter. However, the battle scars of the LTTE Terrorist Attack were clearly seen on Col. Mujahid also, as he lost both his lower limbs and was permanently on a wheelchair. After a few days, a recovered Nathmy returns to PMA among her platoon-mates who are delighted to have her back. That evening, out on the PMA grounds, the LC platoon gather around a campfire and turn by turn relate their experiences of their time at PMA as their training is almost complete.

A few days later, the Award Ceremony, Nathmy (though Sri Lankan) sang an Urdu song on stage with Arzoo. The LC platoon won an award in almost all the award categories and each one of our main seven LCs (except for Syeda Sidra Batool) won an accolade in one particular area of accomplishment. The LCs now imagined going back into their world as stronger, more polished individuals with a new found determination and truly as 'Women of Steel'. At the mess table, they are visited by the PMA Commandant and in a sudden fear of having to repeat a scene from ISPR's 1990's serial Sunehray Din, Sidra fears having to drink a glass full of water and curry cocktail.

=== Episodes 24 (Finale) ===
Standing out in the PMA gardens, the LCs are all talking to their families on the phone and confirming their attendance for the ‘Passing Out’ ceremony. Then during the tea-time get-together in the common room as the TV is on, a news reel pops up in which there is information of military unrest in Waziristan and Rabia's brother SSG Commando Captain Daniyal is very badly wounded in action. Rabia loses control and forgets that she has to keep herself mentally intact to lead the parade during the ‘Passing Out’ Ceremony. Trying to confirm the extent of her brother's injuries she is given the option of leaving PMA and going to see her brother in hospital instead of leading the parade. In her place, Mahjabeen is selected to lead. But Mahjabeen simply cannot side-line Rabia a second time as she is already paying the price of her betrayal the first time. So she builds up Rabia's mental composure, self-esteem and courage and encourages her to lead the platoon. They mend fences and go back to being as close as they had always been since childhood. However, at one point during this entire emotional scene, Rabia was on the verge of telling Mahjabeen that one of the reasons why Rabia's parents didn't finalize the match between Daniyal and Mahjabeen is that – deep inside Daniyal only had 'brother-sister' like feelings for Mahjabeen (and never looked upon her from the viewpoint of being a possible life-partner.) But had Rabia told this to Mahjabeen – she would have been even more heart broken.

On the Parade day, Rabia leads the LCs on the ground and wins the Sword of Honour as the best student of PMA. As all the LCs have their families and friends at the ceremony, Nathmy meets and congratulates Shehryar Mujahid and his family for his passing out too. The LCs write their ‘farewell’ notes on the Dorms notice-board along with their photos in uniform. After the ceremony, Rabia hurries to CMH Rawalpindi to see her brother who is already half healed after seeing a strong ‘Captain Rabia’. He is delighted to see her so confident. Nasar sees her and congratulates her on her achievement and offers to drive her back to PMA.

We are made to witness each LC's welcome home coming. We witness each one leaving the stage almost in the same order as we saw them enter the stage one by one with Arzoo being the first and Nathmy the last. And as each one salutes her people on behalf of the Pakistan Army, they each mention that they are the first female Army Officer in their community. Shaista returns home to see that her fiancé Kaamil has opened a girls school in her name; Pariwesh gets a lavish welcome by her Tribal leader and landlord and witnesses her rifle-shooting and marksmanship skills first hand in front of the entire clan. Mahjabeen arrives home to a lavish aristocratic party as she walks in wearing her all-black Pakistan Army Ceremonial Attire. Lastly, Nathmy Pereira is seen off at Islamabad Airport to go home to Sri Lanka by the family of her dear ‘Uncle’ Col. Mujahid Saleem.

== Cast ==
=== Main ===
Name	Role	Notes
Sajal Aly	Rabia Safeer	SSG Capt. Daniyal's sister & Capt. Nasar's fiancé
Kubra Khan	Mahjabeen Mastaan	Capt. Nasar's cousin
Yumna Zaidi	Shaista Khanzada	Kaamil's fiancé & Gul's sister
Ramsha Khan	Pariwesh Jamal	Balochi village girl from Sibi
Syra Yousuf	Arzoo Daniel	Agnes' and Daniel's daughter
Yehali Tashiya Kalidasa	Nathmy Perrera	Overseas Sri-Lankan Lady Cadet
Dananeer Mobeen	Syeda Sidra Batool	One of the girls in the LC group

=== Recurring ===
Name	Role	Notes
Sheheryar Munawar Siddiqui	SSG Commando Major Usama	Kiran's husband
Usman Mukhtar	SSG Commando Capt. Daniyal Safeer	Rabia's brother
Asim Azhar	Capt. Nasar	Mahjabeen's cousin and Rabia's fiancé
Sonia Mishal	Kiran	Major Usama wife
Ghazala Kaifee	Mrs. Safeer	Rabia's mother
Munazzah Arif	Agnes	Arzoo's mother
Syed Mohammad Ahmed	Daniel	Arzoo's father
Junaid Jamshed Niazi	Kaamil	Shaista's cousin and fiancé
Asad Siddiqui	Noraiz	Arzoo's friend
Asal Din Khan	Moosa Khanzada	Shaista's father
Ali Rehman Khan	Kumail	Mahjabeen's fiancé
Merub Ali	Gul Khanzada	Shaista's sister
Komail Anam	Wali Muhammad Khan	Shaista's cousin
Usman Peerzada	Mahjabeen's father	
Saba Hameed	Mahjabeen's mother	
Abdullah Mehrab Khann		
Nayeem Asensio		
Aehsun Talish		Recurring appearance; episode 15
Omer Ahmed Bokhari	Commandant of PMA	Recurring appearance

== Production ==
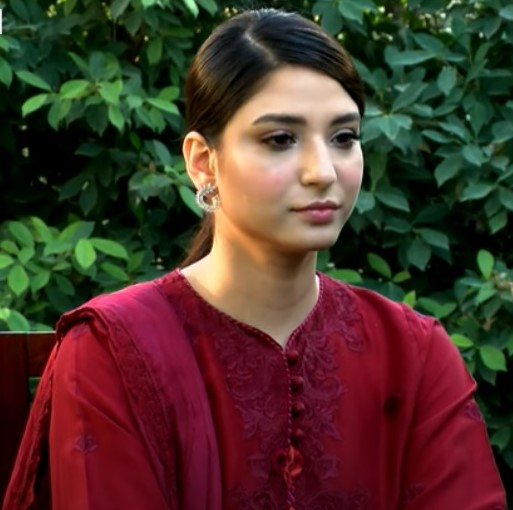
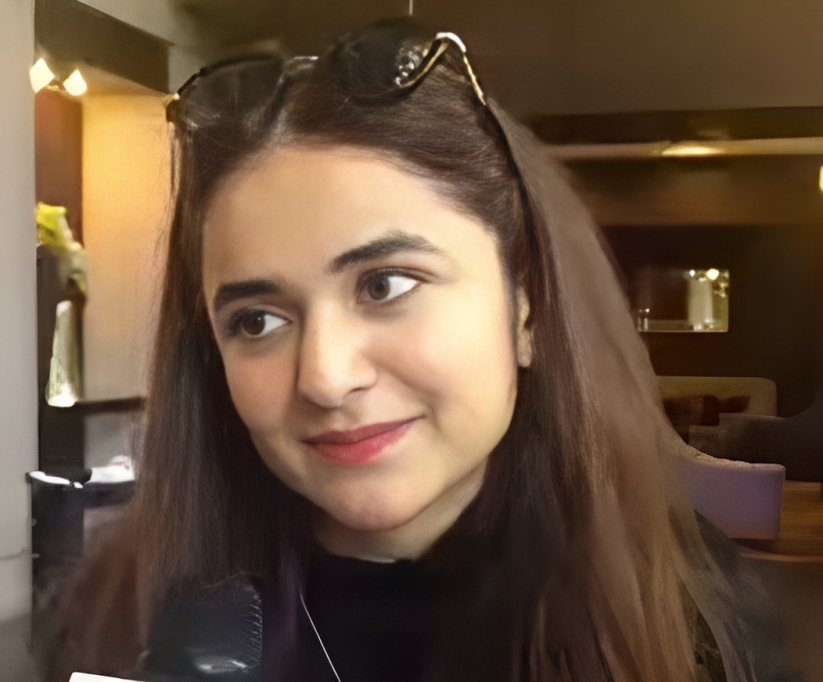
Ramsha Khan, Yumna Zaidi, Sajal Aly played the leads Pariwesh, Shaista and Rabia respectively, alongside Kubra Khan and Syra Yousuf

Producers first announced the project on 29 June 2021 along with cast revelation. Ramsha Khan, Yumna Zaidi, Sajal Aly, Kubra Khan and Syra Yousuf were cast as the leads. The poster of the serial along with first teaser was released on 10 November 2021. During filming, the lead cast received military training and participated in physical training at Pakistan Military Academy.

== Soundtrack ==
"Sinf-e-Aahan"

Song by Zeb Bangash and Asim Azhar
- Language: Urdu
- Released: 17 December 2021
- Recorded: 2021
- Genre: Television soundtrack
- Length: 4:26 (Male version); 4:15 (Female version)
- Label: ARY Digital; ISPR
- Composer: Asim Azhar
- Lyricists: Asim Azhar; Hassan Ali; Ahsan Talish
- Producer: Qasim Azhar
External videos
- Male version on YouTube
- Female version on YouTube

The soundtrack of the drama has been composed by Asim Azhar and has been sung by Azhar along with Zeb Bangash. The lyrics have been penned by Hassan Ali, Ahsan Talish and Asim Azhar. Azhar performed the OST of the series without any charges.

== Reception ==
Sinf-e-Aahan was ranked by the media portals as one of the best TV series of 2022 season. Yumna Zaidi and Junaid Jamshed Niazi's pair was termed as one of the most loved on-screen couple of 2022.

Something Haute noted, "Sinf e Aahan aims to feature women embracing their strengths. Every character's performance was on point and their story easily grips the audience. All the actors have a powerful screen presence, which makes the drama an absolute treat to watch." Images Dawn wrote, "The discipline, the physical exertion and the uniformity of everything is a complete shock to the girls. It results in moments which range from hilarious to emotional. This serial is an entire package appropriate for multi-generational viewing.

Sinf-e-Aahan was dubbed in Azerbaijani and was broadcast in Azerbaijan.

== Accolades ==
Year	Awards	Category	Nominee	Result	Ref(s).
2023	Lux Style Awards	Best TV Play	Sinf-e-Aahan	Nominated	
2023	Lux Style Awards	Best TV Director	Nadeem Baig	Nominated	
2023	Lux Style Awards	Best TV Writer	Umera Ahmad	Nominated	
2023	Lux Style Awards	Best TV Actress – Critics' choice	Sajal Aly	Nominated	
2023	Lux Style Awards	Best Emerging Talent in TV	Dananeer Mobeen	Won	
2023	Lux Style Awards	Best Ensemble Play	Sinf-e-Aahan	Won	
2023	IPPA Awards	Best Drama	Sinf-e-Aahan	Won	
2023	IPPA Awards	Best Director TV Serial	Nadeem Baig	Nominated	
2023	IPPA Awards	Best Actor Male TV Serial	Sheheryar Munawar	Nominated	
2023	IPPA Awards	Best Actor Female TV Serial	Sajal Aly and Yumna Zaidi	Nominated	
2023	IPPA Awards	Best Supporting Actor TV Serial	Saba Hamid and Ramsha Kanwal	Nominated	

== See also ==
- ARY Digital Programming
- Team Muhafiz
- Ehd-e-Wafa
