= Lux Style Award for Best TV Actress - Critics' choice =

Lux Style Award for Best TV Actress - Critics
- Awarded for: Best TV Actress
- Country: Pakistan
- Presented by: Unilever Pakistan
- First award: Iqra Aziz (2019)
- Currently held by: Yumna Zaidi (2023)

Lux Style Award for Best Television Actress - Critics' choice is the award given by Lux in its annual award ceremony to honour an actress with critically acclaimed actress. The category was first introduced in 2019 in 18th Lux Style Awards. In first two years, no separate nominees were announced for the category.

== Winners and nominees ==
Listed below are the winners of the award for each year, as well as the other nominees.

Key	Meaning
	Indicates the winning actress

Year	Actress	Role	TV series	Network
2018 (18th)	Iqra Aziz	Ajiya Nazakat Ali/ Jiya	Suno Chanda	Hum TV
2019 (19th)	Iqra Aziz	Noor Bano/ Noori	Ranjha Ranjha Kardi	Hum TV
2020 (20th)
2020 (20th)	Yumna Zaidi	Mahjabeen	Pyar Ke Sadqay	Hum TV
2020 (20th)	Sajal Aly	Momina Sultan	Alif	Geo Entertainment
2020 (20th)	Hira Mani	Kashf	Kashf	Hum TV
2020 (20th)	Mawra Hocane	Anaya Aziz	Sabaat	Hum TV
2020 (20th)	Urwa Hocane	Guddi	Mushk	Hum TV
2021 (21st)
2021 (21st)	Hadiqa Kiani	Sakina	Raqeeb Se	Hum TV
2021 (21st)	Iqra Aziz	Ameera	Raqeeb Se	Hum TV
2021 (21st)	Mahira Khan	Mehreen Aswad	Hum Kahan Ke Sachay Thay	Hum TV
2021 (21st)	Kubra Khan	Mashal Sultan	Hum Kahan Ke Sachay Thay	Hum TV
2021 (21st)	Yumna Zaidi	Sumbul/ Allah Rakhi	Dil Na Umeed To Nahi	TV One
2022 (22nd)
2022 (22nd)	Yumna Zaidi	Bakhtawar	Bakhtawar	Hum TV
2022 (22nd)	Sajal Aly	Rabia Safeer	Sinf-e-Aahan	ARY Digital
2022 (22nd)	Iqra Aziz	Laila	Aik Thi Laila	Express Entertainment
2022 (22nd)	Hania Aamir	Hala Hamza Ahmad	Mere Humsafar	ARY Digital
2022 (22nd)	Hadiqa Kiani	Mehrunnisa	Dobaara	Hum TV

=== Multiple wins ===
- Iqra Aziz-2
- Yumna Zaidi-2
