= Dua Zehra case =

Child marriage case in Pakistan

- Court: Sindh High Court
- Verdict: The case doesn't warrant the charge of kidnapping and Dua Zehra is free to decide her fate. Later, her custody was granted to her parents.
- Defendant: Zaheer Ahmed (husband)
- Plaintiff: Mehdi Ali Kazmi (father)

Keywords
- Child marriage

Dua Zehra is a girl from Karachi, Pakistan who went missing from her home on 16 April 2022 and days after was found, married to a boy in Okara, Punjab. The case made headlines across the country and continued to dominate the news cycle for months.

After she was traced on 26 April 2022, she said that she left her home on her own free will and defended her marriage to Zaheer Ahmed claiming to be 18 years old. Her parents fought a long legal battle for her return, asserting her marriage to be child marriage.

== Background ==
On 16 April 2022 her parents reported to Police that Dua Zehra went missing from Alfalah Town. CM Sindh Murad Ali Shah took notice of the case and IG Sindh formed a team to recover her. Ten days later she was traced to Okara, Punjab, and found to be married to a boy named Zaheer Ahmed in Lahore. In a video message released she said she left her home on her own free will and claimed to be 18 years old. She was presented to a magistrate in Lahore where after her statement she was allowed to go with her husband. Her parents on other hand argued that she is a minor as per Nadra's record and can't get married.

== Investigation ==
According to Police, Dua Zehra and Zaheer Ahmed became friends on social media from where they proposed to marry. She married Zaheer in Lahore after leaving her home in Karachi and according to her Nikahnama, the bride's age was 16 while the groom was 21. Her parents moved to Sindh High Court for determination of her age. The High Court asked Police to present her before the court. Police for weeks failed to recover her as the couple went into hiding again. From Lahore they went on till Mansehra, Khyber Pakhtunkhwa, and Muzaffarabad, Azad Kashmir, and were finally recovered from Bahawalnagar, Punjab, on 5 June 2022. She was brought to Karachi and a medical test was conducted where her age was determined to be 16–17 years old by the Police's surgeon. The High Court ruled that the case doesn't warrant the charge of kidnapping and she's free to decide her fate. The Lahore High Court also stopped the police from harassing Zaheer's family and viewed no case of abduction was found. Sindh Police also filed in court for the quashing of the charges after the High Court's ruling.

== Later developments ==
Dua Zehra's father Mehdi Ali Kazmi challenged the Sindh High Court's verdict in the Supreme Court of Pakistan. Lawyer and activist Jibran Nasir assisted Nabeel Kolachi, who moved the petition contending that the High Court had erred in not giving minor's custody to parents. The Supreme Court disposed off the petition asking them to approach a proper forum for determination of child marriage as two courts have ruled against kidnapping in the case specifically allowing the Petitioner to approach the relevant forum for constitution of a medical board and noting that any and all observation in respect of age of minor by the High Court would not be an impediment and/or would be disregarded

Afterwards, Dua's father filed in a Karachi court for the constitution of a medical board to determine her age. The court allowed for it and a 10-member medical board was constituted by the Sindh Health Department. The medical board viewed that her age is between 14 and 16 years old.

Later on Dua Zehra made a plea in court to be shifted to Darul Aman alleging threats from parents and also not being on good terms with her husband. She was then shifted to Darul Aman. On the order of Sindh High Court she was moved back to Karachi to remain in the custody of the Child Protection Bureau for trial. On January 6, 2023, Dua Zehra's custody was granted to the parents. Dua Zehra asked the court to go back In a further twist in the case, Karachi Police later told the court that 24 people, including Dua's purported husband Zaheer, were found to be involved in the abduction and child marriage While on the other hand Dua's father sought the removal of the Investigation Officer which the court granted and asked the new IO to submit challan in the case. On March 8, 2025, a Court has ruled that the marriage of Dua Zehra and Zaheer Ahmed is valid, dismissing a petition that sought to declare their Nikah (marriage contract) as fake.

== See also ==
- Child marriage in Pakistan
- Child Marriage Restraint Act
- Sindh Child Marriage Restraint Act 2013
