= Child marriage in Pakistan =

Child marriage (marriage of minors under the age of 18) is banned by law and is criminalized under the Pakistan Penal Code. But, it is practised in some parts of the country, with the highest prevalence in the Sindh province. It disproportionately affects the female children. According to UNICEF report from 2018, around 18% of women aged 20–24 years were found to be married before the age of 18 (almost 20.5 million). For children married before the age of 15, the number drops to 4% or 5 million. Child marriage occurs most often in rural areas, and the primary driving factor is poverty among the low-income households where education is minimal.

== Causes ==
Early and child marriage are directly attributable to deep-rooted gender inequalities, traditional practices, and customs. Dependency on elders and lack of occupational aspirations further hampers the efforts of limiting child marriages.

The close relationship between female chastity and family honour forces family members to marry girls at an early age to prevent sexual transgressions and consequent damage to family reputation. The conceptualization of the girl child as 'other's property' who has to eventually move to her husband's home prevents parents from investing in their daughter's education and daughters thus are married off at an early age to relieve parents of their 'burden'.

The problem of child marriage is at times justified on the basis of religious foundations. Historically, it can be explained as a reaction to invasions by foreigners; desire to perpetuate the cult of the family by marrying the son early; by marrying the daughter early to escape the discredit caused to the family by the presence of grown-up maiden; or by desire of the mother to marry her son early so that she may sooner obtain the possession of a daughter-in-law in whom the mother could inculcate her habits of obedience and who could share the domestic chores with the mother. In the case of parents, sometimes it is due to their keenness to relieve themselves of the responsibility of marrying their daughter. They are also considered socially acceptable for reasons of responsibility and economically desirable for saving marriage expenses, bride price/dowry.

In certain situations, it is known as dand or bada in Sindh, vani in Punjab, and swara in Khyber Pakhtunkhwa and the tribal areas. In this practice, an accused family gives its girl or girls in marriage to an aggrieved family to settle a blood feud between the two parties.

At times, women and girl children are deprived of their property rights by symbolically marrying them to the Quran. This ensures that the girl child will not bear children in the future and will not demand her rightful share in the family property. Sometimes poor parents who cannot afford to marry their daughters rely on this symbolic arrangement.

Exchange marriage or Watta Satta is also practised in many parts of Pakistan. In a watta satta arrangement, both families trade brides. Both families must have a daughter and a son and must be willing to betroth them to the daughter and son of the other family. Watta satta marriages put females in a precarious position as a divorce between one of the couples may trigger a divorce between the other couple because of strong sibling ties. Such marriages are a crime if child marriages are involved in the arrangement.

Another custom in Pakistan, called swara or vani, involves village elders solving family disputes or settling unpaid debts by marrying off girls. The average marriage age of swara girls is between 5 and 9.

The phenomenon known as "monsoon brides" has been brought on by the consequences of climate change, which have been more apparent in recent years. Although there haven't been any official studies on child marriage, nonprofit organizations like Sujag Sansar claim that anecdotal evidence points to the practice being more common throughout the country.

== Consequences ==
Over the years, there has been a decline in the occurrence of child marriages. The trend of child marriages has been a major cause of girls' illiteracy or lower level of education. It can also damage the girls physical, mental and social health leading to serious health issues in the future. Prenatal, neonatal, and maternal health problems are also tied to women married before the age of 18. It is also evident that child marriages are widely prevalent alongside child labour, especially in rural areas. The possibility of mismatches of marriages is high. Infants born to the child mothers are many times feeble. The marital lives remain unhappy, and "child-wives" lack happiness due to their inability to support their lot. Often, the young wives become vulnerable to sexually transmitted diseases.

== Laws against child marriage ==
=== The Child Marriage Restraint Act 1929 ===
Child marriage in Pakistan is legally prohibited under the Child Marriage Restraint Act 1929 (No XIX). Under the Act, the minimum age for marriage was 18 years for a male and 16 years for a female (section 2). However, under a new bill passed in Pakistani Senate, the minimum age of marriage for female was increased to 18. Contravention is punishable with a fine of Rs.1000 and an imprisonment of one month or both for

- An adult male (above 18 years of age) who contracts marriage with a child (section 4).
- A person who solemnizes a child marriage (section 5).
- A parent or guardian who does not act to prevent a child marriage (section 6).

The 1929 Act is one of those few laws on the statute books that were introduced by the founder of Pakistan, Muhammad Ali Jinnah, while he was a member of the British India Legislative Assembly. It was passed on October 1, 1929, to restrain the solemnization of child marriages and applied to the whole of India effective April 1, 1930. It still remains in force, and extends to the whole of Pakistan. It applies to, both Muslim and Non-Muslim, citizens of Pakistan, and regardless of whether they are resident in Pakistan or elsewhere.

Prior to the 1929 Act, the Age of Consent Act in 1891 was enacted which laid down the age below which a marriage should not be consummated. Child marriages however continued unabated. It was in order to control this menace that the 1929 Act was enacted. The purpose of the Act, as its title signifies, is to restrain the solemnization of child marriages. Child was originally defined in the Act to mean a "person who, if a male, is under 14 years of age, and if a female, is under 12 years of age." The age was subsequently raised. The Muslim Family Laws Ordinance 1961 (No VIII) effective July 15, 1961, raised the age of girl child in the Act from 14 to 16 years of age; and lowered the age of male from 21 to 18 years to the extent of the Muslim citizens; this means that the age for the non-Muslim citizens remains the same as prior to the 1961 Amendment. The Act, after being amended by the 1961 Ordinance, states that, whoever being a male above 18 years of age, contracts a marriage with a girl child of less than 16 years, shall be punishable with simple imprisonment extending up to one month, or with fine extending up to Rs 1000, or with both.

Additionally whoever performs, conducts or directs any child marriage, defined as marriage to which either of the contracting parties is a child, is punishable with simple imprisonment extending up to one month, or fine extending up to Rs 1000, or with both, unless he proves that he had reason to believe that the marriage was not a child marriage. Similarly, any person having charge of the minor contracting a child marriage, whether as parent or guardian or in any other capacity, lawful or unlawful,

- who does any act to promote the marriage; or
- permits it to be solemnized; or
- negligently fails to prevent it from being solemnized;

is punishable with simple imprisonment extending up to one month, or with, fine extending up to Rs 1000, or with both, provided that no woman is punishable with imprisonment. For purposes of this section of the Act, it will be presumed under law, unless and until the contrary is proved, that where a minor has contracted a child marriage, the person having charge of such minor has negligently failed to prevent the marriage from being solemnized. No court other than Magistrate of the first class can take cognizance of, or try, any offense under the Act. However even he cannot take cognizance after the expiry of one year from the date on which the offense is alleged to have been committed; and unless, except in Punjab, a complaint is made by the union council within whose jurisdiction a child marriage is or is about to be solemnized, or if there is no union council in the area by such authority as the provincial government may in this behalf prescribe.

In cases where the court is satisfied from information laid before it through a complaint or otherwise that a child marriage has been arranged or is about to be solemnized, the court may issue an injunction against any of male contracting the marriage; or the persons involved in the performance, conduct or direction of the child marriage; or the persons having charge of the minor whether as parent or guardian or in any other capacity whether lawful or unlawful. No injunction, however, can be issued unless the court has previously given notice to the person concerned, and has afforded him an opportunity to show cause against the issue of the injunction. Such an injunction order can also be rescinded or altered by the court. Disobedience of the injunction order is punishable with imprisonment extending up to three months, or with fine extending up to Rs 1000, or with both, provided that no woman can be punished under this section of the Act.

=== Prevention of Anti-Women Practices Act, 2011 ===
This law prohibits several oppressive and discriminatory customs practiced towards women in Pakistan which are not only against the dignity of women but also violate human rights and are contrary to Islamic Injunctions. The 2011 Act amended Pakistan Penal Code and Criminal Procedure Code as well by adding a new chapter to Pakistan Penal Code to bring the punishments into effect.

Section 310-A: There shall be punishment for giving a female in marriage or otherwise in badla-e sulh, wanni or swara or any other custom or practice under any name in consideration of settling a civil dispute or a criminal liability, shall be punished with imprisonment of 3–7 years, and shall also be liable to a fine of 500,000 rupees.

Section 498-A: Depriving women from inheriting property by deceitful or illegal means shall be punished with imprisonment of 5–10 years, or with a fine of 1,000,000 rupees or both.

Section 498-B: Involvement in forced marriages will result in an imprisonment of 3–10 years, along with a fine of 500,000 rupees.

Section 498-C: Forcing, arranging or facilitating a woman's marriage with the Holy Quran is punishable with a jail term of 3–7 years, along with a fine of 500,000 rupees.

=== Child Marriage Restraint (Amendment) Bill, 2018 ===
In 2019, a bill introduced by Pakistani senator, Sherry Rehman, was passed in the Pakistani Senate to increase the minimum age of marriage for female to 18. The bill was aimed at ending child marriage in Pakistan. The bill was passed with overwhelming majority. However, some Pakistani religious political parties like Jamiat Ulema-e-Islam (JUI-F) and Jamaat-e-Islami (JI) opposed the bill. The parties claimed that the bill was against Islam. However, the senator Sherry Rehman said that the Muslim countries like Oman, Turkey and United Arab Emirates have already set 18 as the minimum age of marriage.

One of the senators, Raza Rabbani, stated that a similar bill Sindh Child Marriage Restraint Act 2013 was passed in Sindh assembly back in 2014 and it was not challenged by anyone at any forum.

On May 30, 2025, President Zardari signed the bill.
