= Tere Ishq Ke Naam =

2023 Pakistani television series

- Genre: Drama
- Written by: Maha Malik
- Directed by: Ahmed Bhatti
- Starring: Hiba Bukhari; Zaviyar Nauman Ijaz
- Country of origin: Pakistan
- Original language: Urdu
- No. of episodes: 34

Production
- Producer: Fahad Mustafa
- Production company: iDream Entertainment

Original release
- Network: ARY Digital
- Release: 27 April – 12 October 2023

Tere Ishq Ke Naam is a Pakistani television series written by Maha Malik and produced by Fahad Mustafa under the banner of iDream Entertainment. The series stars Hiba Bukhari and Zaviyar Nauman Ijaz. It premiered on ARY Digital on 27 April 2023. The series received nomination for Best TV Play at Lux Style Awards.

== Plot ==
The story follows Rutba, a young woman who is in love with her cousin Altamash. However, a misunderstanding changes the course of her life and leads to her marriage to Khursheed, another member of her extended family. As relationships develop, Rutba begins to reconsider her feelings and her understanding of love, responsibility and gratitude.

== Cast ==
- Hiba Bukhari as Rutba
- Zaviyar Naumaan Ijaz as Khursheed
- Usama Khan as Altamash
- Yashma Gill as Azka
- Jamal Shah
- Nida Mumtaz
- Arisha Razi Khan
- Nadia Afghan
- Sajid Shah
- Munazzah Arif
