= Fareeda Shabbir =

Pakistani actress

- فریدہ شبیر
- Born: 4 December 1970 (age 55); Karachi, Sindh, Pakistan
- Education: University of Karachi
- Occupation: Actress
- Years active: 1990 – present
- Spouses: Shabbir Jan (m. 1999) Raheel (m. 1987; div. 1997)
- Children: 2

Fareeda Shabbir is a Pakistani actress. She is known for her roles in Urdu TV dramas Ghalati, Romeo Weds Heer, Mera Dil Mera Dushman, Yeh Zindagi Hai, Saraab, Dobara and Bikhray Moti.

== Early life ==
She was born on 12 December 1970 in Karachi, Pakistan. She completed her education from University of Karachi.

== Career ==
Fareeda made her debut as an actress in 1990 on PTV. She was noted for her roles in dramas Pas-e-Aaina, Moam, Manjdhar, Rehnay Do and Phir Youn Love Hua. Then Fareeda appeared in dramas Aa Mere Pyar ki Khusboo, Dil Tou Kachha Hai Jee, and Bubbly Ghar Se Kyun Bhaagi. She appeared in drama series Yeh Zindagi Hai and Yeh Zindagi Hai Season 2 as Joga. Since then she appeared in dramas Saraab, Ghisi Piti Mohabbat, Ghalati, Romeo Weds Heer, Bikhray Moti and Mera Dil Mera Dushman.

== Personal life ==
Fareeda married Raheel in 1990 but after seven years they divorced in 1997. Then she married actor Shabbir Jan on 23 September in 2001. They have two children together, a son and daughter. Fareeda along with Shabbir runs their Shab's Salon & Spa. Fareeda's daughter Yasmeera Jan is also an actress.

== Filmography ==
=== Television ===
Year	Title	Role	Network
1992	Pas-e-Aaina	Murada	PTV
1993	Kashish	Dolly	PTV
1994	Rasm-E-Wafa	Naeema's mother	PTV
1995	Chand Sa Mukhda	Natasha	PTV
1996	Peela Jora	Paro	PTV
1997	Aanchal	Doctor Sahiba	PTV
1997	Panchwan Mausam	Farida	PTV
1997	Tipu Sultan: The Tiger Lord	Maharani	PTV
1998	Such Much	Aneesa	PTV
1998	Jinnah Se Quaid	Kasturba Ghandhi	PTV
1999	Saibaan	Zaheer's sister	PTV
2000	Aansoo	Tai	PTV
2000	Rehnay Do	Sundus	PTV
2004	Game	Rabia	PTV
2004	Phir Youn Love Hua	Amna's mother	PTV
2004	Naseeb	Tara	PTV
2006	Barson Baad	Zahida	PTV
2008	Yeh Zindagi Hai	Joja	Geo Entertainment
2009	Aa Mere Pyar ki Khusboo	Zainab	ATV
2009	Koi Aur Hai	Sania	Geo TV
2010	Moum	Roha's mother	PTV
2010	Aross Paross	Zanbeela	ARY Digital
2011	Teray Milnay Ko	Sabiha	ATV
2011	Dil Tou Kachha Hai Jee	Ramzan's mother	ARY Digital
2012	Bubbly Ghar Se Kyun Bhaagi	Romana	Geo TV
2012	Pak Villa	Ammi Jan	Geo TV
2013	Yeh Zindagi Hai Season 2	Joja	Geo Entertainment
2015	Yehi Hai Zindagi	Chamki	Express Entertainment
2016	Manjdhar	Shahida	Geo TV
2016	Hum Sab Ajeeb Se Hain	Mrs. Kamal	Aaj Entertainment
2017	Bharosa	Seemi	ARY Digital
2017	Kab Mere Kehlaoge	Anika's mother	ARY Digital
2018	Khuwabzaadi	Khalil's mother	TV One
2018	Romeo Weds Heer	Rolly	Geo TV
2019	Ghalati	Samina	ARY Digital
2019	Dolly Darling	Doctor Deegi	Geo TV
2020	Mera Dil Mera Dushman	Shagufta Zafar	ARY Digital
2020	Dikhawa Season 1	Sabiqa's mother	Geo Entertainment
2020	Bikhray Moti	Qudsia	ARY Digital
2020	Saraab	Hoorain's Mother	Hum TV
2020	Ghisi Piti Mohabbat	Rubeena	ARY Digital
2021	Juda Huay Kuch Is Tarha	Erum	Hum TV
2021	Banno	Ayesha	Geo Entertainment
2021	Sirat-e-Mustaqeem	Bilqis	ARY Digital
2021	Dobara	Adeela	Hum TV
2021	Baddua	Haleema	ARY Digital
2022	Jo Na Mil Sakay	Nuzhat	Aaj Entertainment
2022	Dil Zaar Zaar	Khalida	Geo Entertainment
2022	Sirat-e-Mustaqeem Season 2	Sabra	ARY Digital
2022	Mamlaat	Faiza's mother	Geo TV
2022	Bulbulay Season 2	Afreen	ARY Digital
2022	Mere Damad	Dua's mother	Hum TV
2022	Dil Bhatkay	Samina	TV One
2022	Meray Humnasheen	Bakhtawar	Geo TV
2022	Habs	Bilquis	ARY Digital
2022	Siyani	Maria's mother	Geo Entertainment
2022	Zindagi Aik Paheli	Nargis	Geo TV
2022	Agar	Zainab's mother	Hum TV
2023	Grift	Bano	Geo Entertainment
2023	Sirat-e-Mustaqeem Season 3	Mrs. Majid	ARY Digital
2023	Fareb	Bua	Hum TV
2023	Jinzada	Shehnaz Begum	Geo Entertainment
2023	Pyari Nimmo	Rizwana	Geo Entertainment
2023	Jaisay Aapki Marzi	Mrs. Afzar	ARY Digital
2023	Kahain Kis Se	Sabiha	Hum TV
2023	Rah e Junoon	Usman's mother	Hum TV
2024	Sirat-e-Mustaqeem Season 4	Irha's mother	ARY Digital
2024	Khudsar	Rida's mother	ARY Digital
2024	Teri Chhaon Mein	Naveed's mother	Hum TV
2024	Tark-e-Wafa	Razia	ARY Digital
2025	Dastak	Roomi	ARY Digital
2025	Pal Do Pal	Zuleikha	ARY Digital
2025	Daam-e-Mohabbat	Shaheen Begum	Hum TV
2025	Madawa	Ishrat	ARY Digital

=== Telefilm ===
Year	Title	Role
2023	Pyar Paisa Aur Eid	Jamila
