= Maha Tahirani =

Maha Ishaq Tahirani is a Pakistani super model and actress. She is known for winning 'Best Model of The Year' award at the Lux Style Awards 2023. She has also acted in Jamun Ka Darakht movie featuring Adnan Siddiqui.

== Career ==
After completing her LLB degree from the University of China, Maha Tahirani came back to Pakistan to pursue a career in modelling. Her first modelling project was for Sana Safinaz. Her first international shoot was held in Dubai. In 2020, she was nominated for the 'Best Emerging Talent' award at the 19th Lux Style Awards. In 2021, she was nominated for the female 'Model of the year' award at the 20th Lux Style Awards. Next year, Maha was also nominated for 'Best Fashion Model of the year award'. In 2023, she won the 'Best Fashion Model of the year' at the 22nd Lux Style Awards. In the same year, she made her acting debut with Jamun Ka Darakht, a short film by Rafay Rashidi starring Adnan Siddiqui.

== Biography ==
Born in Pakistan, Maha Tahirani pursued a degree in criminal law from the University of London at the age of 20. After becoming a lawyer, she came back to Pakistan. She has been vocal about the issue of colorism, having turned down a fairness cream rebranding offer. She has also called out brands for unethical practices of payment.

== Awards and nominations ==
Lux Style Awards
Year	Award	Category	Result	Ref.(s)
2020	Best Emerging Talent	Female Model	Nominated	
2021	Model of the year	Female	Nominated	
2022	Best Fashion Model of the year	Male/Female	Nominated	
2023	Best Fashion Model of the year	Male-Female	Won	
