= Mujhe Pyaar Hua Tha =

Pakistani television series

- Title screen
- Genre: Love Triangle; Class/ Status Difference; Revenge
- Written by: Sidra Seher Imran
- Directed by: Badar Mehmood
- Starring: Wahaj Ali; Hania Aamir; Zaviyar Nauman Ijaz
- Music by: SK Salman Khan
- Opening theme: Mujhe Pyaar Hua Tha by Kaifi Khalil
- Country of origin: Pakistan
- Original language: Urdu
- No. of episodes: 32

Production
- Producers: Fahad Mustafa; Dr. Ali Kazmi
- Camera setup: Multi-camera setup
- Running time: 38–45 minutes
- Production company: Big Bang Entertainment

Original release
- Network: ARY Digital
- Release: 12 December 2022 – 31 July 2023

Mujhe Pyaar Hua Tha (I Had Fallen in Love) is a 2022 Pakistani romantic drama television series, written by Sidra Seher Imran and directed by Badar Mehmood. Produced by Fahad Mustafa and Dr. Ali Kazmi under the banner Big Bang Entertainment, it aired from 12 December 2022 to 31 July 2023. It stars Wahaj Ali, Hania Aamir and Zaviyar Nauman Ijaz with Rabya Kulsoom, Salma Hassan, Shaheen Khan and Angeline Malik.

The series depicts a story of love, trust and betrayal which revolves around the main characters, Saad, Maheer and Areeb. The series met with mixed to negative reviews from the critics. Despite this, it has gained popularity in Pakistan, India and Bangladesh.

== Plot ==
Maheer Azhar (Hania Aamir) is a very carefree girl, living with her family, which consists of her parents Azhar Hussain (Shahood Alvi) and Rafia Azhar Hussain (Salma Hassan), her uncle Sarwar Hussain (Noor ul Hassan) and aunt Aneesa Sarwar Hussain (Shaheen Khan), her cousins Saad Hussain (Wahaj Ali) and Neelo Sarwar Hussain (Rabya Kulsoom). Saad has always been in love with Maheer, which only Neelo knows about. Afterwards, Maheer goes to her cousin Anabia's engagement, where she meets Anabia's friend Areeb (Zaviyar Nauman Ijaz), who falls in love with her. Saad becomes suspicious of him after meeting him. Rafia tells Azhar she wants Maheer to live a luxurious life with a rich and fancy husband, which Azhar isn't happy about.

After meeting Areeb a few more times and after he proposed to her, Maheer starts to develop feelings for Areeb. Sarwar is then forced by Neelo to talk to Azhar about finalising Saad and Maheer's marriage. Azhar agrees, but Maheer is mad about this, which Saad notices. Maheer tells Saad that she thinks of him as her best friend and that she likes Areeb. Saad promises that she will get what she wants, so Saad tells Azhar he doesn't want to marry Maheer, resulting in Azhar kicking him out and Sarwar slapping him.

Areeb arrives with his mother Beenish (Angeline Malik), but she leaves after seeing Maheer's cramped house and her style. Areeb then points a gun to himself in front of his parents for them to make a decision, so Beenish forcefully fixes Maheer and Areeb's marriage. But on the wedding day, Areeb's father Rehan (Javed Sheikh) suffers a heart attack, resulting in his being admitted to the hospital. After trying to contact Areeb, Azhar is called by Beenish, who lies to him that Areeb never loved Maheer and she insults Maheer's whole family. Maheer is heartbroken after this. Sarwar then decides to put Saad in Areeb's place as the groom.

Maheer says yes to her marriage with Saad in sadness, forcing Saad to say yes as well to the marriage, but Saad says the rukhsati won't happen yet and he leaves. When Areeb arrives, Sarwar and Azhar kick him out, and Beenish calls Areeb to tell him that Rehan has died, leaving Areeb distraught and in guilt. It is revealed that Rafia told Saad to say no to his and Maheer's marriage. Saad and Maheer are trying to adjust to their married life but Neelo tells her parents that Saad has always loved Maheer and Maheer knew Areeb and liked him before their marriage was finalised, which makes Sarwar go to Azhar and he yells at Rafia, asking her why she put all the blame on Saad. Maheer also confronts her mother about this, saying that it was never Saad's fault and she wasn't capable of Areeb's love and trust.

Areeb tries his best to win Maheer. He forcefully tries to talk to Maheer but she ignores him. Areeb gets into an accident and Saad is arrested. Areeb's self-proclaimed fiancée Faha blames Maheer for Areeb's condition. Sarwar dies from a heart attack and Neelo blames Maheer for it. Maheer and Saad come closer she realises Saad's love for her and accepts him as her husband. Then Maheer rejects Areeb and starts a new life with Saad.

== Cast ==
=== Main ===
- Wahaj Ali as Saad Hussain- Sarwar and Aneesa's son; Neelo's brother; Maheer's husband
- Hania Aamir as Maheer Saad (nee Azhar)- Azhar and Rafia's daughter; Saad's wife
- Zaviyar Nauman Ijaz as Areeb Rehan- Rehan and Beenish's son; Maheer and Faha's ex fiancé

=== Recurring ===
- Noor ul Hassan as Sarwar Hussain- Azhar's elder brother; Aneesa's husband; Saad and Neelo's father (Dead).
- Shaheen Khan as Aneesa Sarwar Hussain- Sarwar's wife; Saad and Neelo's mother.
- Rabya Kulsoom as Neelo Sarwar Hussain- Sarwar and Aneesa's daughter; Saad's sister.
- Ayesha Mirza as Hiba- Maheer and Saad's friend.
- Shahood Alvi as Azhar Hussain- Sarwar's younger brother; Rafia's husband; Maheer's father.
- Salma Hassan as Rafia Azhar Hussain- Azhar's wife; Amna's sister; Maheer's mother.
- Ambar Khan as Amna Saud- Rafia's sister; Saud's wife; Anabia's mother.
- Sabeena Syed as Anabia Faris- Amna and Saud's daughter; Maheer's cousin.
- Abduallah Khan as Faris- Anabia's husband.
- Javed Sheikh as Rehan- Beenish's husband; Areeb's father (Dead).
- Angeline Malik as Beenish Rehan- Rehan's widow; Areeb's mother.
- Washma Fatima as Faha- Areeb's cousin and ex fiancé.

== Production ==
Initially the series was titled "Rasam-e-Dil" and launched with the current title "Mujhe Pyaar Hua Tha", based on the lyrics of the song "Kahani Suno" by Kaifi Khalil, who also sang the OST. The series marked Aamir and Ijaz's second on-screen appearance after Sang-e-Mah.

== Soundtrack ==
"Mujhe Pyaar Hua Tha"

Single by Kaifi Khalil
- Language: Urdu
- Genre: Theme song
- Length: 3:31
- Songwriter: Kaifi Khalil
- Producers: Fahad Mustafa; Dr. Ali Kazmi
External videos
- Music video on YouTube

The Mujhe Pyaar Hua Tha title song is composed, written and sung by Kaifi Khalil. It is an updated version of his popular song "Kahani Suno", adapted for the series.

Track list
No.	Title	Singer(s)	Length
1.	"Mujhe Pyaar Hua Tha" (OST)	Kaifi Khalil	3:31

== Reception ==
The serial received highly negative reviews for its direction, storyline and performances mainly; Aamir and Naumaan's acting was criticized by critics. However, Ali's acting was highly appreciated by critics as well as audience. Nevertheless, It managed to high ratings during its television slot and digitally on YouTube and against expectations trending in Pakistan, India and Bangladesh.
