= Salma Hassan =

Pakistani actress (born 1975)

- Born: Salma Hassan; 25 February 1975 (age 51); Karachi, Pakistan
- Education: University of Karachi
- Occupations: Actress, host
- Years active: 1998 – present
- Spouse: Azfar Ali (m. 2001; div. 2012)
- Children: Fatima (daughter)

Salma Hassan (born 25 February 1975) is a Pakistani actress. She is best known for her role in sitcom Sub Set Hai. Some of her other notable appearances include Tanhaiyan Naye Silsilay, Khaani, Do Bol, Pyar Ke Sadqay and Parizaad.

== Career ==
Salma Hassan born on 25 February 1975 in Karachi, Sindh, Pakistan. Hassan made her debut as an actress in 1998 on PTV with a supporting role in Mehreen Jabbar's Dhoop Mein Sawan. In 2001, she rose to prominence with her comic role in sitcom Sub Set Hai. After a few more appearances, she went into hiatus of few years. After her return, she is now widely cast in the role of mothers. Khaani, Pyar Ke Sadqay, Parizaad and Mujhe Pyar Hua Tha are some of the television series where she portrayed such roles.

== Personal life ==
Hassan was married to director and actor Azfar Ali, with whom she had worked on the sitcom Sub Set Hai of Indus Vision. They worked together on screen too. They were divorced in 2012, and have one daughter from their marriage.

== Filmography ==
=== Television ===
Year	Title	Role	Network	Notes
1998	Dhoop Mein Sawan	Sara	PTV	Acting debut
2001	Sub Set Hai	Nadia	Indus Vision	Lead role
2003	Umrao Jaan Ada	Ram Dai	Geo TV	Guest appearance
2010	Vasl	Soni	Hum TV	
2011	Dareecha	Sanam	ARY Digital	
2012	Talafi	Nomeer's wife	PTV	
2012	Tanhaiyan Naye Silsilay	Sania's friend	ARY Digital	
2014	Choti	Naila	Geo TV	
2016	Aap Ke Liye	Bhabi	ARY Digital	
2016	Socha Na Tha	Zarina	ARY Zindagi	
2017	Phir Wohi Mohabbat	Ramsha	Hum TV	
2017	Khaani	Sonia Salman Ali Khan	Geo Entertainment	
2018	Mere Khudaya	Shaheena	ARY Digital	
2019	Bharam	Ishrat Mushtaq	Hum TV	
2019	Do Bol	Nasreen	ARY Digital	
2020	Pyar Ke Sadqay	Seema	Hum TV	
2020	Tum Ho Wajah	Shahaab's mother	Hum TV	
2020	Dunk	Mahnoor	ARY Digital	
2021	Shehnai	Tooba	ARY Digital	
2021	Parizaad	Shaista	Hum TV	
2021	Rang Mahal	Durdana	Geo TV	
2021	Juda Huway Kuch Is Tarhan	Khadija	Hum TV	
2021	Baddua	Ayesha	ARY Digital	
2022	Meray Humnasheen	Dr. Sabika	Geo TV	
2022	Mujhe Pyaar Hua Tha	Rafia	ARY Digital	
2023	Fairy Tale	Zeenat	Hum TV	
2023	Jurm	Bunty	Geo Entertainment	Cameo
2023	Ishq Murshid	Safia	Hum TV	
2023	Fairy Tale Season 2	Zeenat	Hum TV	
2024	Very Filmy	Savera	Hum TV	
2024	Bharam	Rabia	ARY Digital	
2025	Mafaad Parast	Farah	Geo TV	
2026	Sara Aapi	Khalida	Geo TV	
2026	Rehmat	Zubaida	ARY Digital	
2026	Rutba		ARY Digital	

=== Web series ===
Year	Title	Role	Network
2021	Dhoop Ki Deewar	Ayesha	ZEE5
2023	Family Bizniss	Pinky's mother	Tamasha Channel

=== Film ===
Year	Title	Role
2022	XXL	Mehak's mother
