= 22nd Lux Style Awards =

Pakistani film awards ceremony

- Sponsored by: Lux
- Date: 6 October 2023
- Location: Expo Centre, Karachi
- Country: Pakistan
- Hosted by: Saba Qamar; Dur-e-Fishan Saleem; Fahad Mustafa; Ahmad Ali Butt

Highlights
- Most awards: Sinf-e-Aahan (2); Sang-e-Mah (2); Bakhtawar (2)
- Most nominations: Sang-e-Mah (7); Mere Humsafar (7)
- Best Film: Kamli
- Best Television Play: Kaisi Teri Khudgarzi
- Best Song of the Year: "Kahani Suno" – Kaifi Khalil
- Best Fashion Model: Maha Tahirani

Television/radio coverage
- Network: Hum TV
- Produced by: Hum TV
- Directed by: Muhammad Jamal Khan

The 22nd Lux Style Awards was an award ceremony presented by Lux to honour the best in fashion, music, films, and television of 2022, which took place on 6 October 2023 in Karachi, Pakistan. The ceremony was hosted by Saba Qamar, Dur-e-Fishan Saleem, Fahad Mustafa and Ahmad Ali Butt.

Kamli led the ceremony among the films by winning three awards while Sang-e-Mah, Bakhtawar and Sinf-e-Aahan each won two awards, highest for any television production.

== Winners and Nominees ==
The submissions were announced the first week of September with nominations being announced on 27 September 2023.

=== Film ===
Best Film (Viewers' Choice)	Best Film (Critics' Choice)
Quaid-e-Azam Zindabad; Tich Button; Joyland; London Nahi Jaunga; Kamli	Kamli; Joyland; Dum Mastam; Ghabrana Nahi Hai; Quaid-e-Azam Zindabad
Best Film Actor	Best Film Actress
Feroze Khan - Tich Button; Farhan Saeed - Tich Button; Humayun Saeed - London Nahi Jaunga; Fahad Mustafa - Quaid-e-Azam Zindabad; Imran Ashraf - Dum Mastam	Saba Qamar - Kamli; Hania Amir - Parde Mein Rehne Do; Kubra Khan - London Nahi Jaunga; Mahira Khan - Quaid-e-Azam Zindabad; Alina Khan - Joyland
Best Film Director	Best Film Song
Sarmad Khoosat - Kamli; Saim Sadiq - Joyland; Yasir Nawaz - Chakkar; Wajahat Rauf - Parde Mein Rehne Do	"Peela Rung" from Parde Mein Rehne Do - Hassan Ali Hashmi, Nehaal Naseem; "Mainu Tu " from Kamli; "Ehsaan Hai Tumhara" from Tich Button; "Mahiya Ve Mahiya" from London Nahi Jaunga; "Loota Rey" from Quaid-e-Azam Zindabad

=== Television ===
Best TV Play (Viewers' Choice)	Best Ensemble Play (Critics' Choice)
Kaisi Teri Khudgarzi (ARY Digital); Hum Tum (Hum TV); Mere Humsafar (ARY Digital); Sinf-e-Aahan (ARY Digital); Sang-e-Mah (Hum TV)	Sinf-e-Aahan (ARY Digital); Hum Tum (Hum TV); Mere Humsafar (ARY Digital); Badshah Begum (Hum TV); Sang-e-Mah (Hum TV)
Best Television Actor (Viewers' Choice)	Best Television Actress (Viewers' Choice)
Arslan Naseer - Paristan (Hum TV); Farhan Saeed - Mere Humsafar (ARY Digital); Atif Aslam - Sang-e-Mah (Hum TV); Danish Taimoor - Kaisi Teri Khudgarzi (ARY Digital); Feroze Khan - Habs (ARY Digital)	Yumna Zaidi - Bakhtawar (Hum TV); Ramsha Khan - Hum Tum (Hum TV); Hania Amir - Mere Humsafar (ARY Digital); Ayeza Khan - Chaudhry and Sons (Geo Entertainment); Hiba Bukhari - Meray Humnasheen (Geo Entertainment)
Best Television Actor (Critics' Choice)	Best Television Actress (Critics' Choice)
Bilal Abbas Khan - Dobara (Hum TV); Farhan Saeed - Mere Humsafar (ARY Digital); Noman Ijaz - Kaisi Teri Khudgarzi (ARY Digital); Yasir Hussain - Aik Thi Laila (Express Entertainment); Faysal Quraishi - Dil-e-Momin (Geo Entertainment)	Yumna Zaidi - Bakhtawar (Hum TV); Hania Amir - Mere Humsafar (ARY Digital); Iqra Aziz - Aik Thi Laila (Express Entertainment); Sajal Aly - Sinf-e-Aahan (ARY Digital); Hadiqa Kiani - Dobara (Hum TV)
Best Television Director	Best Television Writer
Saife Hassan - Sang-e-Mah (Hum TV); Shahid Shafaat - Bakhtawar (Hum TV); Ahson Talish - Chauraha (Geo Entertainment); Yasir Hussain - Aik Thi Laila (Express Entertainment); Nadeem Baig - Sinf-e-Aahan (ARY Digital)	Mustafa Afridi - Sang-e-Mah (Hum TV); Nadia Ahmed - Bakhtawar (Hum TV); Faiza Iftikhar - Aik Thi Laila (Express Entertainment); Qaisra Hayat - Ishq-e-Laa (Hum TV); Umera Ahmed - Sinf-e-Aahan (ARY Digital)
Best Television Long Play	Best Emerging Talent in Television
Betiyaan (ARY Digital); Paristan (Hum TV); Mushkil (Geo Entertainment); Siyani (Geo Entertainment); Woh Pagal Si (ARY Digital)	Dananeer Mobeen - Sinf-e-Aahan (ARY Digital); Atif Aslam - Sang-e-Mah (Hum TV); Sachal Afzal - Bakhtawar (Hum TV); Janice Tessa - Habs (ARY Digital); Azaan Sami Khan - Ishq E Laa (Hum TV)
Best Television Track
Mere Humsafar (ARY Digital) - Sung by: Amanat Ali, Yashal Shahid and Zaheer Abbas; Composed by: Naveed Nashad; Hum Tum (Hum TV) Sung by: Ali Zafar, Damia Farooq; Composed by: Naveed Nashad; Kaisi Teri Khudgarzi (ARY Digital); Sang-e-Mah (Hum TV) Sung by: Atif Aslam; Composed by: Sahir Ali Bagga; Habs (ARY Digital)

=== Music ===
Singer of the Year	Song of the Year
Ali Sethi - "Pasoori"; Abida Parveen - "Tu Jhoom"; Asfar Hussain - "Mehram"; Asim Azhar - "Habibi"; Kaifi Khalil - "Kan Yaari"	"Kahani Suno" - Kaifi Khalil; "Pasoori - Ali Sethi & Shae Gill; "Habibi" - Asim Azhar; "Saaz" - Auj; "Tu Jhoom" - Abida Parveen & Naseebo Lal
Most Streamed Song of the Year	Music Producer of the Year
"Pasoori"- Ali Sethi & Shae Gill; "Iraaday" - Abdul Hannan; "Mehram" - Asfar Hussain & Arooj Aftab; "Phir Milenge" - Faisal Kapadia &Young Stunners; "Ye Dunya"- Talha Anjum, Faris Shafi & Karakoram	Abdullah Siddiqui & Xulfi - "Pasoori"; Abdullah Siddiqui & Xulfi - "Tu Jhoom"; Abdullah Siddiqui, Xulfi, Arsalan Hasan & Sherry Khattak - "Kana Yaari"; Xulfi & Abdullah Siddiqui - "Phir Milenge"; Zain & Xulfi - "Thagyan"

=== Fashion ===
Emerging Talent of the Year	Fashion Model of the Year (Male/Female)
Abeer Asad; Aisha Kamran; Maleena Mansoor; Mamya Shajaffar; Sauban Umais	Maha Tahirani; Sachal Afzal; Sauban Umais; Abeer Asad; Fatima Hasan
Fashion Forward Brand of the Year	Fashion Photographer/ Videographer of the Year
Hussain Rehar; Khaadi; Sania Maskatiya; Suffuse by Sana Yasir; Zainab Salman	Aleena Naqvi; Asad bin Javed; HM Studio; MHM; OKB Films
Fashion Hair and Make-up Artist of the Year	Fashion Stylist of the Year
Sunil Nawab; Arshad Khan; Qasim Liaqat; Salman at NABILA's; Shainal Pervaiz	Tabesh Khoja; Hafsa Farooq; Mehek Saeed; Yasser Dar; Zahra Sarfraz
Most Stylish Musician of the Year
Meesha Shafi; Aima Baig; Risham Faiz; Taha G; Talhah Yunus

=== Honorary ===
Life Time Achievement Award	Lux Changemaker Award
Reema Khan	Marina Khan
