= Qissa Meherbano Ka =

Pakistani television series

- Official title card
- Genre: Romance; Drama
- Written by: Fakhra Jabeen
- Directed by: Iqbal Hussain
- Starring: Mawra Hocane; Ahsan Khan; Zaviyar Nauman Ijaz; Mashal Khan
- Country of origin: Pakistan
- Original language: Urdu
- No. of episodes: 24

Production
- Executive producer: Momina Duraid
- Producer: Momina Duraid
- Running time: approx. 38-40 minutes
- Production company: MD Productions

Original release
- Network: Hum TV
- Release: 28 August 2021 – 26 February 2022

Qissa Meherbano Ka (Urdu: قصہ مہربانو کا, lit. 'Tale of Meherbano') is a 2021 Pakistani television series premiered on 28 August 2021 on Hum TV. It is directed by Iqbal Hussain, written by Fakhra Jabeen and produced by Momina Duraid under MD Productions. The serial stars Mawra Hocane, Ahsan Khan, Zaviyar Nauman Ijaz and Mashal Khan in lead roles while Zaib Rehman, Syed Mohammad Ahmed, Ghazala Kaifee, Khushhal Khan and Areej Mohyudin in supporting roles.

== Cast ==
- Mawra Hocane as Meherbano ''Mehru'' Muraad Ali
- Ahsan Khan as Muraad Ali
- Zaviyar Nauman Ijaz as Mehraan Ali Mehtaab
- Mashal Khan as Fariyaal "Fari" Murad Ali
- Syed Mohammad Ahmed as Asghar Ali Mehtaab
- Zaib Rehman as Afiya and Murad's mother
- Ghazala Kaifee as Ghazala
- Laila Zuberi as Safiya
- Areej Mohyudin as Noor Ayaz Mehtaab
- Isha Khan as Sarah
- Khushhal Khan as Ayaz Atif Ali Mehtaab
- Mahrunisa Iqbal as Eman
- Hassan Noman as Achhay Mian
- Waqas Shahzad as Atif Ali Mehtaab
- Sadia Farooq as Afiya Ali Mehtaab
- Faiza Azeem as Mehru's aunt
- Sahir Jahangir

== Production ==
=== Background and development ===
In mid-June 2021, Zaviyar Nauman Ijaz, son of veteran actor Nauman Ijaz, revealed that he is going to make his television debut in a MD Productions drama. Later, Hocane also announced being a part of the serial through her Instagram account in late June 2021. The principal photography began in same month in Islamabad. The series is directed by Iqbal Ansari who previously directed Zebaish (2020). The script was written by Fakhra Jabeen which had the trivial portrayal of marital rape. On Hocane's account, the script was altered and the scenes were reshoot.
