= Zaviyar Nauman Ijaz =

Pakistani actor (born 1997)

- Born: Zaviyar Nauman Ijaz; 21 November 2001 (age 25); Lahore, Pakistan
- Education: Aitchison College
- Occupations: Actor; Model
- Years active: 2021 – present
- Relatives: Nauman Ijaz (father)

Zaviyar Nauman Ijaz is a Pakistani actor who works in Urdu television. He made his acting debut with the drama Qissa Meherbano Ka and has since appeared in dramas including Sang-e-Mah, Wehem, Bakhtawar and Mujhe Pyaar Hua Tha.

== Early life and education ==
Ijaz is the son of veteran TV actor Nauman Ijaz.

He completed his early education from Aitchison College from Lahore and later he moved to Canada and opened a restaurant. He got interested in acting during his second year in university. He studied business management and also did theatre plays.

Later, he returned to Pakistan and did some modeling and soon then he was cast in drama Qissa Meherbano Ka in 2021. Before entering acting, he struggled with weight issues, and went from 105kg to 75kg in five months in order to start his professional career, citing Nawazuddin Siddiqui as his main acting role-model.

== Career ==
After doing modeling he was offered drama Qissa Meherbano Ka (2021) which he accepted, portraying the role of Mehraan, a shy and caring friend of Meherbano, which received positive reviews. He won Best New Sensation Actor Award at 8th Hum Awards for his role in drama Qissa Meherbano Ka. In 2022 he appeared in the ensemble cast drama Sang-e-Mah with Hania Aamir, which mainly stars Atif Aslam, Sania Saeed and Nauman Ijaz. He portrayed the role of Hikmat Khan a bubbly, courageous and mad-in-love with Gul Meena which was portrayed by Aamir.

The same year, he appeared in the romance drama Mujhe Pyaar Hua Tha along with Wahaj Ali and Hania Aamir where he portrayed the role of Areeb Rehan a wealthy friend of Maheer. This was his second collaboration with Aamir after Sang-e-Mah. Later he cast in drama Wehem which was written by Imran Nazir and directed by Adnan Wai Qureshi with Savera Nadeem, Kinza Hashmi and Babar Ali. He portrayed the role of Junaid who is the cousin of Eshal portrayed by Kinza and who are in love with each other but Eshal parents want to marry her with him but his's mother has a problem with Eshal's father. Then he appeared as Malik Dilawar in drama Bakhtawar with Yumna Zaidi.

In 2023 he appeared in drama Tere Ishq Ke Naam with Hiba Bukhari, Usama Khan and Yashma Gill on ARY Digital. Later he appeared in drama Gunjal along with Noor Zafar Khan, Imran Aslam and Sahiba and he did the role of a college student Kabeer.

== Filmography ==
=== Television serials ===
Year	Title	Role	Network	Note	Ref(s)
2021	Qissa Meherbano Ka	Mehran	Hum TV	Leading role	
2022	Sang-e-Mah	Hikmat Khan	Hum TV	Supporting role	
2022	Mujhe Pyaar Hua Tha	Areeb Rehan	ARY Digital	Leading role	
2022	Wehem	Junaid	Hum TV	Leading role	
2022	Bakhtawar	Malik Dilawar	Hum TV	Leading role	
2023	Tere Ishq Ke Naam	Khurshid	ARY Digital	Leading role	
2023	Gunjal	Kabeer	Aur Life	Leading role	
2024	Rafta Rafta	Hamza	Green Entertainment	Leading role	
2024	Hum Dono	Shahroz	Hum TV	Leading role	
2024	Diyar-e-Yaar	Shahmir	Green Entertainment	Leading role	
2025	Agar Tum Sath Ho	Saahir	Hum TV	Leading role	
2026	Ghulam Bashah Sundri	Bashah	Green Entertainment	Leading role	
2026	Raja London Ka	Adil Sultan	Express TV	Leading role	
2026	Hey Fam	Faizan Mustaqeem	ARY Digital	Leading role	

== Awards and nominations ==
Year	Award	Category	Work	Result	Ref.
2022	8th Hum Awards	Best Television Sensation - Male	Qissa Meherbano Ka	Won	
2023	International Pakistan Prestige Awards	Best On-Screen Couple with (Hania Aamir)	Sang-e-Mah	Nominated	
