= Hey Fam =

2026 Pakistani television series

- Genre: Family drama
- Written by: Awais Ahmad Joyia
- Directed by: Zeshan Ansari
- Starring: Dua Zahra; Zaviyar Nauman Ijaz; Zarrar Khan; Faysal Quraishi; Nadia Afgan
- Country of origin: Pakistan
- Original language: Urdu

Production
- Producer: iDream Entertainment

Original release
- Network: ARY Digital
- Release: 16 September 2026

Hey Fam is a Pakistani television drama series produced by iDream Entertainment. The series features Dua Zahra, Zaviyar Nauman Ijaz and Zarrar Khan in leading roles, alongside Faysal Quraishi and Nadia Afgan. It premiered on ARY Digital on 16 September 2026.

== Plot ==
The story follows Seerat Ansari, a young woman from a middle-class family whose life changes after a video she shares on social media attracts widespread attention. Her sudden popularity introduces new opportunities but also creates complications in her personal relationships.

The series also follows Faizan Mustaqeem, an investigative journalist, and Ayyan, a social media personality. Their experiences provide different perspectives on online popularity, public image and the challenges of navigating a world increasingly influenced by digital platforms.

== Cast ==
- Dua Zahra as Seerat Ansari
- Zaviyar Nauman Ijaz as Faizan Mustaqeem
- Zarrar Khan as Ayyan
- Faysal Quraishi
- Nauman Masood
- Nadia Afgan
- Arjumand Rahim
- Mashal Karim
- Haleema Ali

== Production ==
Hey Fam was produced by iDream Entertainment. Awais Ahmad Joyia wrote the series, while Zeshan Ansari directed it. The production focuses on social media culture and the influence of online popularity on personal relationships.

One of the production's notable technical features was a ten-minute sequence filmed in a single continuous take without conventional editing cuts. Film producer Abdullah Seja praised the sequence and the director's execution of the scene.
