= Hania Aamir =

Pakistani Television actress (born 1997)

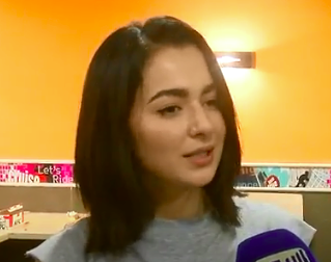
- Aamir in 2026
- Born: 12 February 1997 (age 29); Rawalpindi, Punjab, Pakistan
- Occupation: Actress
- Years active: 2016–present

Hania Aamir (Note: Urdu: ہانیہ عامر) is a Pakistani actress who works in Urdu television and films. She has received three Hum Awards and a Lux Style Award. In 2026, she was featured in Forbes Asia's 30 Under 30 list.

Aamir made her acting debut with the comedy films Janaan (2016), Na Maloom Afraad 2 (2017) and subsequently began her television career with Phir Wohi Mohabbat (2017) which earned her the Hum Award for Best Television Sensation Female and rose to fame with the commercially successful films the combat war Parwaaz Hai Junoon (2018) and the romantic comedy Sardaarji 3 (2025). Further popularity came with Mere Humsafar (2022), Mujhe Pyaar Hua Tha (2023) and Meri Zindagi Hai Tu (2025). Aamir received praise for her portrayals in the romantic dramas Anaa (2019), Ishqiya (2020), Kabhi Main Kabhi Tum (2024). For the latter she received her first Lux Style Award for Best TV Actress.

In addition to acting, she serves as the ambassador for several brands and products. On Instagram, Aamir is the most-followed Pakistani woman.

== Early life and education ==
Aamir was born in Rawalpindi in the Punjab province and comes from a Punjabi speaking family with roots in Murree. Her parents separated early in her life, and she was raised by a single mother. Hania has spoken publicly about facing emotional trauma and financial difficulties during her childhood.

She enrolled at the Foundation for Advancement of Science and Technology (FAST-NUCES), which is where she was studying when she auditioned for her debut film, Janaan (2016). She later dropped out of college, citing her need to earn money to financially support her family. She described herself as having been a "rebellious" student during her time in college.

== Career ==
=== Early work (2016–2019) ===
Aamir was studying at the Foundation for Advancement of Science and Technology (FAST-NUCES), when she auditioned for the romantic comedy Janaan (2016).

Aamir subsequently starred as a beauty-obsessed unfaithful wife in the 2017 romantic drama Titli. Her performance in Hum TV's romantic drama Phir Wohi Mohabbat (2017), earned her the Best Television Sensation Female at the Hum Awards. That same year, Aamir played a headstrong bride-to-be in the heist comedy Na Maloom Afraad 2. The following year, Aamir featured in Parwaaz Hai Junoon alongside Hamza Ali Abbasi, Ahad Raza Mir and Kubra Khan. Her next portrayal was of a girl next door in the melodrama Visaal (2018), opposite Zahid Ahmed and Saboor Aly.

Aamir played the free-spirited heiress of Shergarh in Anaa (2019) opposite Shehzad Sheikh. She also sang the title track of the series along with Sahir Ali Bagga, which has garnered 8 million views on YouTube. She received positive reviews for her work.

=== Rise to fame (2020–present) ===
In 2020, Aamir played a carefree and outgoing girl Rumaisa Siddique, in Ishqiya opposite Feroze Khan. She received a nomination for Best Actress TV at the 2nd Pakistan International Screen Awards. The same year she starred as a flirty TikToker girl, Sanam Jameel in Dil Ruba.

In 2022, she briefly appeared as Gul Meena in the ensemble cast drama Sang-e-Mah, co-starring Zaviyar Nauman Ijaz. In 2023, Aamir portrayed Maheer Saad Hussain opposite Wahaj Ali and Zaviyar Nauman Ijaz, in the romantic drama Mujhe Pyaar Hua Tha. Her performance received mixed to negative reviews. In 2024, she starred in Kabhi Main Kabhi Tum opposite Fahad Mustafa where she played Sharjeena, a role that earned positive reviews. In 2025, Hania appeared in the Punjabi-language Indian film Sardaar Ji 3 alongside Diljit Dosanjh and Neeru Bajwa, marking her debut in the Indian Punjabi-language film industry. In 2026, Hania released her debut single, "Pablo".

== Other work and media image ==
Aamir has been described in the media, one of the Pakistan's most popular and highest-paid actresses. She has featured in Hello Pakistan's HOT100 list in the "Headliners" category. She walked the ramp for Zainab Chottani at the "Pakistan Fashion Week" in 2019. She has also done various photoshoots for "Eid Collections" and for designers like Asim Jofa. Aamir is a brand ambassador for several brands like Maybelline New York and Sprite. In 2022, Aamir was named the brand ambassador for Peshawar Zalmi in the Pakistan Super League. Aamir is the most-followed Pakistani celebrity on Instagram, surpassing Ayeza Khan. Aamir was placed 9th in Eastern Eye's Top 50 Asian Stars of 2024.

Following the 2025 Pahalgam attack and the subsequent 2025 India–Pakistan standoff, access to accounts of several Pakistani entertainers on Instagram was restricted within India. Aamir's profile was among those blocked for Indian users. During this period, a fabricated statement claiming she had appealed to the Prime Minister of India, Narendra Modi, circulated on social media. Aamir denied the quote and clarified through her Instagram Stories that she had not issued any such statement. In 2026, she was featured Forbes 30 Under 30 Asia list.

== Filmography ==
=== Films ===
Year	Title	Role	Notes	Ref.
2016	Janaan	Palwasha Asad Khan	Acting Debut - Supporting Role	
2017	Na Maloom Afraad 2	Pari		
2018	Parwaaz Hai Junoon	Sania Taimoor		
2018	Load Wedding	Khalil's love interest	Special appearance	
2019	Superstar	Herself	Special appearance	
2022	Parde Mein Rehne Do	Nazish "Nazo"		
2025	Sardaar Ji 3	Noor	Indian-Punjabi language film	

=== Television ===
Year	Title	Role	Notes	Ref
2017	Titli	Naila	Negative Role	
2017	Phir Wohi Mohabbat	Alishba Waleed		
2017	Mujhay Jeenay Do	Saira		
2018	Visaal	Pari		
2019	Anaa	Daneen	Also singer for title song	
2020	Ishqiya	Romaisa Siddique		
2020	Dil Ruba	Sanam Sabih		
2020	Meray Dost Meray Yaar Season 2	Zoya	Mini series	
2021–2022	Mere Humsafar	Hala Hamza Ahmad		
2022	Sang-e-Mah	Gul Meena		
2022–23	Mujhe Pyaar Hua Tha	Maheer Saad Hussain		
2024	Kaisi Hai Ye Ruswai	Aileen Baris		
2024	Kabhi Main Kabhi Tum	Sharjeena Mustafa Ahmed		
2025–26	Meri Zindagi Hai Tu	Dr. Ayra Kamyar		

=== Other appearances ===
Year	Title	Role	Network	Notes	Ref
2023	Siyaah	Nosheen "Noshi" Faryad	Green Entertainment	Episode: "Unko Chutti Na Mili"	

=== Telefilms ===
Year	Title	Role	Network	Ref.
2018	Band Toh Baje Ga	Mariyam Sohail	Hum TV	
2019	Pyaar Kahani	Masha Rehman	Hum TV	
2021	Dil Ke Chor	Remail	Hum TV	

=== Web series ===
Year	Title	Role	Network	Notes	Ref
2026	Jo Bachay Hain Sang Samait Lo	Umm-e-Mariyam aka Sam	Netflix	Pre–production	

=== Music videos ===
Year	Title	Artist	Notes	Ref.
2020	Sassi	Asim Azhar	Asim Jofa - Ad campaign	
2020	Zalmi	Fortitude - Pukhtoon Core	Peshawar Zalmi Anthem 2020	
2020	Sondhi Sondhi	Grehan Band	Rangrasiya - Ad campaign	
2021	Piyaar Sufiana	Farhan Saeed	Asim Jofa - Ad campaign	
2023	Jani Door Gaye	Hadiqa Kiani		
2024	Dhanak	Haider Mustehsan (HYDR)		
2024	Zalmi Yama	Abdullah Siddiqui, Nehaal & Zahoor	Official Zalmi Anthem for PSL 9	
2026	Pablo	Hania Aamir	Debut single	

== Awards and nominations ==
Year	Award	Category	Work	Result	Ref
2017	16th Lux Style Awards	Best Supporting Actress	Janaan	Nominated	
2018	6th Hum Awards	Best Television Sensation Female	Phir Wohi Mohabbat	Won	
2018	International Pakistan Prestige Awards	Best Actress (Film)	Na Maloom Afraad 2	Nominated	
2018	Hum Style Awards	Most Stylish Film Actress	—N/a	Won	
2020	PISA Awards	Best Television Actress	Anaa	Nominated	
2020	Hum Style Awards	Most Stylish Actress	—N/a	Nominated	
2021	ARY People's Choice Awards	Favourite Actress in a Role of Sister	Ishqiya	Won	
2021	ARY People's Choice Awards	Favourite Jodi with Feroze Khan	Ishqiya	Nominated	
2021	2nd PISA Awards	Best TV Actress (Popular)	Ishqiya	Nominated	
2023	22nd Lux Style Awards	Best Film Actress – Viewer's choice	Parde Mein Rehne Do	Nominated	
2023	22nd Lux Style Awards	Best TV Actress	Mere Humsafar	Nominated	
2023	22nd Lux Style Awards	Best TV Actress Critics Choice	Mere Humsafar	Nominated	
2024	Hum Style Awards	Most Stylish Television Actor Female	—N/a	Won	
2024	9th Hum Awards	Best Actress	Sang-e-Mah	Nominated	
2024	9th Hum Awards	Best Onscreen Couple with Zaviyar Nauman Ijaz	Sang-e-Mah	Nominated	
2024	International Pakistan Prestige Awards	Best Actor – Female	Sang-e-Mah	Won	
2025	UK Parliament	For contribution to the Entertainment industry	Honoured	Won	
2025	23rd Lux Style Awards	Best TV Actress	Mujhe Pyaar Hua Tha	Nominated	
2025	10th Hum Awards	Global Star Award	Honoured	Won	
2025	24th Lux Style Awards	Best Actress of the Year	Kabhi Main Kabhi Tum	Won	
2026	3rd PISA Awards	Best Actress TV (Popular)	Kabhi Main Kabhi Tum	Nominated	
2026	3rd PISA Awards	Best Onscreen couple with Fahad Mustafa	Kabhi Main Kabhi Tum	Nominated	
