= Phir Wohi Mohabbat =

2017 Pakistani television series

- پھر وہی محبّت
- Genre: Psychological drama; Revenge
- Written by: Mansoor Saeed
- Directed by: Mohsin Mirza
- Starring: Ahmed Ali Akbar; Hania Aamir
- Country of origin: Pakistan
- Original language: Urdu
- No. of seasons: 1
- No. of episodes: 22

Production
- Producers: Humayun Saeed, Shahzad Nasib, Momina Duraid
- Camera setup: Multi-camera setup
- Running time: 35 minutes
- Production companies: Six Sigma Plus; MD Productions

Original release
- Network: Hum TV
- Release: 16 March – 10 August 2017

Phir Wohi Mohabbat (Urdu: پھر وہی محبت, lit. 'Again that love') is a Pakistani television series which started airing on Hum TV from 16 March 2017 every Thursday at 8:00 pm. The lead cast included Ahmed Ali Akbar and Hania Aamir. The script was written by Mansoor Saeed and directed by Mohsin Mirza.

The show was dubbed in Pashto under the title Biya Hagha Meena (Pashto: بیاهغه مینه) and aired on Hum Pashto 1.

== Plot ==
Ashar and Yasir are brothers married to two sisters, Samra and Ramsha. Samra is pregnant and already has a daughter, Alishba. The family's loyal servant, Raffiq, cares deeply for Alishba.

During Samra's baby shower, she insults Raffiq's pregnant wife, causing tension in the household. Soon after, Ashar rushes home when Samra goes into labor and accidentally hits Raffiq's wife and son with his car, killing them. He panics and flees. Samra also loses her baby in the hospital. Consumed by guilt, Ashar confesses to Yasir. Raffiq overhears, kidnaps Alishba, and disappears. The shock leaves Samra paralyzed.

Fifteen Years Later
Raffiq has raised Alishba as his daughter and calls her Alina. Alina grew up in a small village, the native place of Raffiq. He becomes seriously ill and moves to Karachi for treatment. To earn money for his operation, Alina unknowingly begins working in her real parents’ home.

The family eventually discovers her true identity. Raffiq apologizes and dies soon after. Samra, who had been depressed since the kidnapping, finds hope again. Alishba struggles to adjust but gradually settles in.

Meanwhile, Waleed (Ramsha's son) returns for his engagement to Sana, but their relationship deteriorates. Waleed grows close to Alishba; Ramsha dislikes Alishba and can't bear to see her sight. Sheheryar, Waleed's friend, falls for Alishba, and Dadi arranges their marriage alongside Waleed and Sana's. But Waleed confesses his love for Alishba, breaking both engagements.

Alishba eventually agrees to marry Waleed and slowly begins to love him, though Ramsha continues trying to separate them. Alishba gets pregnant, but her mother-in-law still wants to create a divide between Alishba and Waleed.

Sana returns and teams up with Ramsha to ruin Alishba's marriage. Ramsha pays a man, Rehmat, to falsely claim Alishba as his wife “Hina” who married Waleed for money. The family doubts her; only Samra stands by her. Hurt, Alishba leaves Waleed and demands a divorce but cannot go through with it; she returns to the village where she was raised.

Waleed, pressured and heartbroken, agrees to remarry Sana. On the wedding day, Sana exposes Ramsha's scheme with evidence. The wedding is cancelled, and Ramsha attempts suicide, leaving herself brain-damaged.

At the same time, Alishba goes into labor. Waleed rushes to her, seeks forgiveness, and she accepts. They have a son whom Ramsha later names Waqas.

== Production ==
According to Amir, she wasn't sure what she was getting into the character of the series as it had a lot of weeping and crying, but it was a learning experience.

== Cast ==
=== Main ===
- Ahmed Ali Akbar as Waleed Yasir: Yasir and Ramsha's son; Alishba's husband.
- Hania Aamir as Alishba Ashar/Alishba Waleed: Ashar and Samra's daughter; Waleed's wife.

=== Recurring ===
- Shamoon Abbasi as Ashar: Alishba's father; Yasir's brother; Samra's husband.
- Zainab Qayyum as Samra Ashar: Alishba's mother; Ramsha's sister; Ashar's wife.
- Shamil Khan as Yasir: Waleed's father; Ashar's younger brother; Ramsha's husband.
- Salma Hassan as Ramsha Yasir: Yasir's wife; Waleed's mother; Samra's elder sister.
- Haris Waheed as Sheheryar: Waleed's childhood friend; Alishba's ex-fiancé.
- Mariam Mirza as Sana's mother.
- Jinaan Hussain as Sana, Waleed's ex-fiancé.

=== Former cast ===
- Saleem Mairaj as Raffiq: the family servant; Alishba's adoptive father (Dead)
- Shamim Hilaly as Amma: Ashar and Yasir's mother. (Dead)

== See also ==
- 2017 in Pakistani television
- List of programs broadcast by Hum TV
