= Wehem =

Pakistani television series

- Genre: Thriller, Romance
- Written by: Imran Nazir (writer)
- Directed by: Adnan Wai Qureshi
- Starring: Savera Nadeem; Shamim Hilaly; Babar Ali; Kinza Hashmi; Zaviyar Nauman Ijaz
- Theme music composer: Ahmed Jahanzeb
- Opening theme: Zeb Bangash
- Country of origin: Pakistan
- Original language: Urdu
- No. of episodes: 29

Production
- Executive producer: Moomal Shuanid
- Editor: Syed Tariq Hussain
- Running time: 36–38 minutes
- Production company: Moomal Productions

Original release
- Network: Hum TV
- Release: 22 June 2022 – 4 January 2023

Wehem (Urdu: وہم, lit. 'Illusion') is a 2022 Pakistani thriller drama television series produced by Moomal Entertainment. The series revolves around the mysterious happenings of an isolated and independent woman who pretends to be caring and sympathetic. The series features Savera Nadeem, Shamim Hilaly, Babar Ali, Kinza Hashmi, and Zaviyar Nauman Ijaz in leading roles. The series first aired on Hum TV in the night programming line-up on 22 June 2022.

== Plot ==
Junaid and Eshal are cousins and in love with each other. Eshal's parents want her to marry him, but Junaid's mother Rukhsana has problems with Eshal's father, Khawar. Years ago, Rukhsana's husband Anwar had gone to Hyderabad and never returned, and she thinks Khawar is responsible for it as he didn't try to find him.

== Cast ==
- Savera Nadeem as Rukhsana Anwar née Saleem
- Shamim Hilaly as Amma Bi
- Babar Ali as Khawar Amin
- Kinza Hashmi as Eshal Khawar
- Zaviyar Nauman Ijaz as Junaid
- Fawad Jalal as Anwar Amin
- Adnan Samad Khan as Fareed
- Hurriya Mansoor as Saira
- Tara Mahmood as Sabahat
- Hajra Khan as Naseem
- Syeda Hurain as Faiza

== Soundtrack ==
The official soundtrack of the series was sung by Zeb Bangash, music was composed by Ahmed Jahanzeb and lyrics were penned by Sabir Zafar.

== Production ==
The series is written by Imran Nazir. Adnan Wai Qureshi, who also directed Neelum Kinaray and Aashti, directed the series while Moomal Shunaid produced it under her banner Moomal Productions.

The principal photography mainly took place in a house located near Shri Swaminarayan Mandir, Karachi.

== Reception ==
=== Critical reception ===
In a review by The News International, the newspaper praised the teasers for having created a peculiar and mysterious atmosphere. While reviewing the first episode positively, the same reviewer praised the performances of the lead cast especially of Nadeem and Hilaly. Youlin Magazine praised the acting performances of Hashmi, Ali, Hilaly and particularly Nadeem, but criticised the dragging story.
