= Habs (TV series) =

2022 Pakistani television drama series

- Title screen
- Urdu: حبس
- Genre: Drama
- Written by: Aliya Makhdoom
- Directed by: Musaddiq Malek, Muhammad Ammad
- Creative director: Muhammad Ammad
- Starring: Ushna Shah; Feroze Khan; Ayesha Omar; Saba Faisal
- Country of origin: Pakistan
- Original language: Urdu
- No. of seasons: 1
- No. of episodes: 33

Production
- Producers: Hamuyan Saeed; Shahzad Naseeb
- Production locations: Karachi, Pakistan
- Camera setup: Multi-camera setup 1080p
- Running time: 40 minutes
- Production company: Six Sigma Plus

Original release
- Network: ARY Digital
- Release: 10 May – 20 December 2022

Habs (Urdu: حبس, transl. Suffocation) is a 2022 Pakistani television series that aired on ARY Digital. It was written by Aliya Makhdoom, directed by Musaddiq Malek in his directorial debut, and produced by Six Sigma Plus. The Project Planning by Muhammad Ammad. The series stars Feroze Khan and Ushna Shah in lead roles.

== Plot ==
Ayesha is trying to find a job because her family is in a financial crisis. Her family consists of her mother Qudsia, her aunt Bobby, and her two sisters Bano and Zoya. Qudsia wants the women of the family to marry rich people, because they are impoverished, and so she never allowed Bobby to marry, since the groom wasn't rich. Ayesha is hired successfully by a company, and she starts working for the rich boss of the company, Basit Salman Khan.

Basit is a short-tempered man and he has a bad relationship with his mother Sadia, because Sadia abandoned Basit to live with her new husband. Because of this trauma, Basit is opposed to getting married. Since Sadia left, Basit has been living with his father Salman, but after Salman dies, Basit reads in the will that the company will only belong to him once he gets married. Basit tries to marry his friend Soha, but after she realises he is rushing to marry anyone he can, Soha refuses him. After Sadia tries to take over Basit's company, Basit lies to her, saying that he has married Ayesha, who is shocked.

Bano is in a relationship with Talaal, but after her mother rejects him due to not being rich and Talaal's mother becoming sick, Talaal marries Zainab, and Bano breaks up with him. Qudsia then meets Basit and decides to have him and Ayesha marry, and Basit pays Qudsia 75 lakh rupees for their marriage, at Qudsia's request. After their marriage, Basit fires Ayesha from her job, which angers her. Later, at Basit's birthday party, he embarrasses Sadia in front of the guests, causing her to collapse and die from the stress.

Zoya is in a relationship with Aamir, but when Aamir's mother Bilquis asks for a dowry, Basit is enraged, leading to Zoya running away and eloping with Aamir. Ayesha hides this from Basit, since she thinks that Basit will think badly about her family. She tells her friend Fahad about Zoya, but Basit mistakenly suspects that Fahad and Ayesha are having an affair. Basit expels Fahad and Ayesha from the house, and Fahad is involved in a car accident. Fahad tells Basit the truth about Zoya, and Basit regrets mistreating Ayesha. Basit asks for forgiveness, and Ayesha forgives him.

Things remain happy, until Soha returns and tries to separate Basit and Ayesha, claiming they are not suitable for each other. Ayesha is then revealed to be pregnant. Zoya returns, but after it is revealed that Zoya stole 1 lakh from Bilquis, Qudsia lies to Aamir saying that Zoya is pregnant, so that Aamir doesn't divorce Zoya.

Ultimately, Aamir learns of Zoya's lies and almost divorces her. Fahad tells Soha about the 75 lakh rupees, so she tells Ayesha this as well, which greatly upsets her. She runs away, with Soha's help. Basit tries to find Ayesha, but cannot. Bano warns Soha to stay away from Basit and Ayesha, so Soha tells Basit that she told Ayesha about his and Qudsia's deal, which Ayesha hears. Ayesha becomes mad at Basit and Soha, and she asks for a divorce. Basit agrees, and they almost divorce, but Basit asks Ayesha to meet him one last time after he tells her he is leaving Pakistan forever.

Meanwhile, Zoya begs for forgiveness from Aamir, but he tells her it will take him some time to forgive her. Basit tells Ayesha he is giving the house to Ayesha for her and her child. Ayesha, worrying whether her child will ask about Basit in the future, and seeing how much Basit has changed, forgives Basit and reunites with him.

Three years later, Bobby is getting married, Zoya and Aamir have reunited, Fahad and Bano are married, and Qudsia is happy. Basit and Ayesha are celebrating with their daughter, Sadia. Everyone takes a group photo together.

== Cast ==
- Feroze Khan as Basit Salman Khan : Salman and Sadia's son; Soha's ex fiance; Ayesha's husband
- Ushna Shah as Ayesha Basit Khan (nee Sadiq) : Sadiq and Qudsia's daughter; Bano's younger sister; Zoya's older sister; Basit's wife
- Ayesha Omar as Soha : Basit's friend and ex fiancée
- Saba Faisal as Qudsiya Sadiq : Sadiq's wife; Ayesha, Bano and Zoya's mother
- Dania Enwer as Bano Sadiq : Sadiq and Qudsia's daughter; Ayesha and Zoya's eldest sister
- Janice Tessa as Zoya Aamir (nee Sadiq) : Sadiq and Qudsia's daughter; Ayesha and Bano's youngest sister, Aamir's wife
- Hina Rizvi as Bobby : Sadiq's sister
- Irsa Ghazal as Sadia Salman Khan : Salman's wife; Basit's mother (dead)
- Mussadiq Malik as Fahad : Basit's best friend
- Imran Aslam as Talal Rasheed : Rasheed and Shamsa's son; Bano's love interest
- Shazia Qaiser as Shamsa Rasheed : Rasheed's wife; Talal's mother
- Hamzah Tariq Jamil as Aamir : Zoya's husband
- Fareeda Shabbir as Bilquis : Aamir's mother
- Birjees Farooqui as Fehmida : Fahad's mother
- Hammad Farooq as Kareem : Basit's friend
- Muhammad Ammad as Salim : Basit's friend

=== Guest appearances ===
- Jawed Sheikh as Salman Khan : Sadia's husband; Basit's father (Episode 1) (dead)
- Anoushay Abbasi as Fahad's wife (Episode 25)

== Critical reception ==
While reviewing the first episode, Cutacut.com said that the series had a "strong start", and called the storyline "relatable" and "intriguing". Noor Ul Huda of The News International reviewing the first few episodes, stated that the story has "nothing new", as the topics of abandonment issues and hatred of mothers have already been extensively done. Maliha Rehman of Dawn praised the direction and actors' performances, but raised the story differing from the title as an issue.

== Accolades ==
Year	Ceremony	Category	Recipient	Result	Ref(s).
October 6, 2023	Lux Style Awards	Best TV Actor (Viewers' Choice)	Feroze Khan	Nominated	
October 6, 2023	Lux Style Awards	Best Emerging Talent in TV	Janice Tessa	Nominated	
October 6, 2023	Lux Style Awards	Best TV Track	Sung by: Nirmal Roy & Shehroze Butt, Composed by: Azad Azim	Nominated	
