= Aik Thi Laila =

Pakistani television series

- Urdu: ایک تھی لیلیٰ
- Written by: Faiza Iftikhar
- Directed by: Yasir Hussain
- Starring: Iqra Aziz; Faysal Quraishi; Yasir Hussain; Maham Amir; Hassan Ahmed
- Music by: SK Salman Khan
- Country of origin: Pakistan
- Original language: Urdu
- No. of episodes: 6

Original release
- Network: Express Entertainment
- Release: 1 December 2022 – 12 January 2023

Aik Thi Laila is a Pakistani television series directed by Yasir Hussain, and written by Faiza Iftikhar. It stars Iqra Aziz, Yasir Hussain, Faysal Quraishi, Hassan Ahmed and Maham Amir with Sheheryar Munawar in a cameo appearance. It aired from 8 December 2022 to 12 January 2023, on Express Entertainment.

At 22nd Lux Style Awards, it received four nominations.

== Cast ==
- Iqra Aziz as Laila
- Yasir Hussain as Inspector Sajid
- Faysal Quraishi as Azeem Ullah
- Inaya Khan as Saba Azeem Ullah
- Gul e Rana as Nuzhat Keenchi
- Nayyar Ejaz as Hafeez
- Hassan Ahmed as Fareed
- Maham Amir as Inspector Rukaiyya
- Saad Farrukh Khan as Majnu
- Usama Bin Ateeq as Kashif
- Fareeha Jabeen as Kashif's mother
- Sheheryar Munawar as Qais (cameo)
- Asif Latta

== Production ==
=== Background and development ===
On 11 August 2022, it reported that Aziz will feature in her husband Hussain's directorial Aik Thi Laila. The other cast members were also revealed along with the genre of the series, which will be murder-mystery. Express Tribune reported that the series will revolve around a disappearance case, much like the Dua Zehra case. The series marked Aziz's comeback to television after 2 years. In conservation with Daily Pakistan, she further reveled that series will have only 5 episodes.

=== Promotion and release ===
The poster of the series featuring the cast members was unveiled by the network on 12 November. The first teaser of the series was released on 15 November 2022.

== Accolades ==
Date of ceremony	Award	Category	Nominee(s)	Result	Ref.
October 6, 2023	Lux Style Awards	Best Television Director	Yasir Hussain	Nominated	
October 6, 2023	Lux Style Awards	Best Television Writer	Faiza Iftikhar	Nominated	
October 6, 2023	Lux Style Awards	Best Television Actor - Critics' choice	Yasir Hussain	Nominated	
October 6, 2023	Lux Style Awards	Best Television Actress - Critics' choice	Iqra Aziz	Nominated	
