= Bakhtawar =

Pakistani drama television series

- بختاور
- Written by: Nadia Ahmed
- Directed by: Shahid Shafaat
- Country of origin: Pakistan
- Original language: Urdu
- No. of episodes: 25

Production
- Executive producer: Momina Duraid
- Camera setup: Multi-camera setup
- Running time: 36–41 minutes approx.
- Production company: MD Productions

Original release
- Network: Hum TV
- Release: 17 July 2022 – 29 January 2023

Bakhtawar (Urdu: بختاور, lit. 'Fortunate') is a Pakistani drama television series directed by Shahid Shafaat and first broadcast on Hum TV from 17 July 2022. It is produced by Momina Duraid under banner MD Productions. It features Yumna Zaidi in the title role as a young headstrong girl who wants to escape from her difficulties and create a better tomorrow for herself. It ended on 29 January 2023, after 25 episodes.

Zaidi's performance in the series was praised for which she won Best TV Actress and Best TV Actress - Critics' choice awards at 22nd Lux Style Awards.

== Plot ==
Living in a small village, Bakhtawar is an ambitious student living in a family of five with a mother, Shareefa, a disabled younger brother, Guddu, and an elder sister, Naseema. Her gambler father, Razaq, forcefully sends her Naseema in a forced marriage, and himself goes leaving the house. Due to poverty, Guddu's treatment couldn't be done and he dies on which her maternal uncle (Maamu) Hameed tries to get her married to his mentally challenged son, Raajo, forcefully. Bakhtawar doesn't let Hameed do so and flees to Karachi with Shareefa by the help of her best friend Naima's brother Ahad, who is in love with her and support her dreams.

There, they live in Sakina's house who lives with her husband, Gaffar and is Shareefa's cousin. Bakhtawar tries to get a job but gets rejected from everywhere until she gets a job of bus conductor. However, it becomes difficult for her to pursue the job due to the behaviour of male passengers and her friend Parveen's murder by their boss after she refused to marry him. Sakina tells her husband that she will sell out them to Hameed as now she is jobless, unable to pay them. Bakhtawar hears it and leaves her house and rents a room from Haji Nazar, a shady man who lives with his wife, Naveeda, and is not in the favour of women's freedom.

She eventually has to disguise herself as a man so she can try to get a job. She lives a double life of Bakhtawar and her twin brother Bakhtu. Bakhtawar as Bakhtu, then works in a restaurant as a waiter and witnesses Malik Dilawar, son of a politician, getting shot. She stays behind to help him and later, he hires her for his job. She works as Bakhtu as Dilawar's personal assistant.

Dilawar is pressurised by his father Malik Sher Zaman to marry Hooriya, a budding politician, who is daughter of famous politician Chaudhary Dastageer, for his political career. However, Hooriya is a selfish and arrogant woman and she dislikes that Dilawar favours Bakhtu.

Bakhtawar's neighbor Shahid aka Sheeda who is a loafer starts harassing her and sends proposal to her. When she refused he decided to throw acid on her face which he accidentally threw on Shahana, classmate of Bakhtawar.

Bakhtawar in her original identity, meets Dilawar and tells her about the acid incident and requests justice for victim. On Dilawar's insisting, police arrests Sheeda. Hooriya gets interested in the case due to Dilawar's involvement and bails out Sheeda. After bail, he again harasses Bakhtawar and also blackmails Hooriya for money.

On the engagement day of Dilawar and Hooriya, the ring goes missing and is found from Bakhtu's office. During investigation, Bakhtu reveals that he is a girl Bakhtawar to Inspector Mohsin, and also reveals her problems. It is revealed that another employee, Ameen, framed Bakhtu. He is arrested.

Sheeda gets to know about Bakhtawar's truth but before he can reveal it, he is murdered by Dastageer's men. On the other hand, Dilwar's maid Noora is lovetrapped by Hooriya's brother Salar. She is warned by Bakhtu but she ignores.

Bakhtawar agrees to marry Ahad and they get engaged. Meanwhile, on Dilawar and Hooriya's pre wedding event, Salar tries to harass Noora but she jumps from the balcony to save her honor. Salar puts blame on Bakhtu, who elopes from the venue.

Police take Bakhtawar and Shareefa to police station so that Bakhtu will come finding them. However, Bakhtawar reveals truth about her identity in front of police and Dilawar. She also gives testimony that Salar had harassed Noora. Dilawar feels betrayed and upset with Bakhtawar for faking her identity but still support and sympathise with her upon realising her life's tough situations which made her do this. On Bakhtawar's statement, Salar gets arrested.

Hooriya and Dastageer use various tactics to end this controversy by maligning Bakhtawar's image and bribing Noora's family to give fake statement but Bakhtawar and Dilawar support her. Noora gives statement and Salar gets punished. Meanwhile, Bakhtawar tells her life story in press conference and receive applaud from public. She thanks Ahad for playing an important role in her life. Meanwhile, Dilawar breaks engagement with Hooriya upon knowing all her wrongdoings.

Haji Nazar's underage second wife Kulsoom, is rescued by Dilawar and Bakhtawar who take responsibility of education of Noora and Kulsoom. Bakhtawar thanks Dilawar for his support and mentorship throughout her journey.

In the end, Dilawar becomes successful politician working for women's education and Bakhtawar and Ahad together in their village educating young girls.

== Cast ==
- Yumna Zaidi as Bakhtawar alias Bakhtu : Shareefa and Razaq's daughter; Naseema and Guddu's sister; Ahad's love interest.
- Zaviyar Nauman Ijaz as Malik Dilawar : Sher Zaman and Saba's son; Hooriya's ex fiancé; Bakhtawar's mentor.
- Ali Wasi Kazmi as Ahad : Naima's brother; Bakhtawar's love interest.
- Huma Nawab as Shareefa Razaq : Naseema, Bakhtawar and Guddu's mother; Razaq's wife; Hameed's sister.
- Saqib Sumeer as Haji Nazar : Bakhtawar's Landlord; Naveeda's husband.
- Mizna Waqas as Naveeda : Haji Nazar's wife.
- Noreen Gulwani as Hooriya Dastageer : Dilawar's ex fianceé; Dastageer's daughter; Salar's sister.
- Adnan Shah Tipu as Hameed : Shareefa's brother; Mukhtar's husband; Raajo's father.
- Kauser Siddiqui as Mukhtar Begum : Hameed's wife; Raajo's mother.
- Qaiser Khan Nizamani as Malik Sher Zaman : Saba's husband; Dilawar's father.
- Fazila Qazi as Malikani Saba Sher Zaman : Sher Zaman's wife; Dilawar's mother.
- Babar Ali as Chaudhary Dastageer : Hooriya and Salar's father.
- Sachal Afzal as Chaudhary Salar : Dastageer's son; Hooriya's brother.
- Sunil Shankar as Shahid aka Sheeda : Bakhtawar's neighbour. (Dead)
- Sana Khan as Noora : Dilawar's maid.
- Salma Asim as Sakina Gaffar : Shareefa and Hameed's cousin; Gaffar's wife.
- Aslam Sheikh as Gaffar : Sakina's husband.
- Shamoon Abbasi as Inspector Mohsin : Dilawar's friend.
- Ayesha Sohail as Nazneen : Hooriya's friend.

=== Guest ===
- Noor ul Hassan as Razaq : Naseema, Bakhtawar and Guddu's father; Shareefa's husband. (Episode 1)
- Washma Fatima as Naseema Razaq : Shareefa and Razaq's daughter; Bakhtawar and Guddu's sister. (Episode 1)
- Rizwan Arshad Abbasi as Job interviewer (Episode 3)

== Production ==
The details about the project were first reported in May 2022, with Sajal Aly was first selected for the title role but later she left the project after shooting some days and eventually replaced by Yumna Zaidi. It was also reported that Zaidi will pair opposite Arsalan Naseer.

The first look of the series was unveiled on 4 July 2022.

== Reception ==
=== Critical reception ===
The drama received critical acclaim instantly right after its first episode. It was praised for its fast pace and close-to-reality plot. Yumna Zaidi is being continuously praised for her performance as Bakhtawar. While reviewing the first episode, a reviewer from The News International praised the direction for depiction of issues and rural Pakistan, cinematography and Zaidi's performance. Another reviewer of the same newspaper was appreciative of the performances of the actors, strong characters and unusual storyline.

=== Television ratings ===
Bakhtawar was highest rated Hum TV program of 2022.

Ep#	Broadcast date	TRP(s)
1	17 July 2022	4.3
2	24 July 2022	6.1
3	31 July 2022	6.0
4	7 August 2022	6.9
5	14 August 2022	6.6
6	21 August 2022	5.0
8	18 September 2022	8.3
21	1 January 2023	8.8
22	8 January 2023	11.3
23	15 January 2023	11.6
24	22 January 2023	8.5
25	29 January 2023	12.0

== Accolades ==
Year	Awards	Category	Nominee	Result	Ref(s).
2023	Lux Style Awards	Best TV Director	Shahid Shafaat	Nominated	
2023	Lux Style Awards	Best TV Writer	Nadia Ahmed	Nominated	
2023	Lux Style Awards	Best TV Actress	Yumna Zaidi	Won	
2023	Lux Style Awards	Best TV Actress - Critics' choice	Yumna Zaidi	Won	
2023	Lux Style Awards	Best Emerging Talent in TV	Sachal Afzal	Nominated	
