= Sindh Child Marriage Restraint Act, 2013 =

The Sindh Child Marriage Restraint Act 2013, passed in 2014, in the Provincial Assembly of Sindh in Pakistan, prohibits the marriage of any child under the age of eighteen years old. The act provides penalties for a male contracting party, the person who solemnizes the marriage as well as the parent or guardian concerned.
