= Sang-e-Mah =

Pakistani television series

- Official Title card
- سنگِ ماہ
- Genre: Romance; Tragedy; Drama
- Inspired by: Hamlet by William Shakespeare
- Written by: Mustafa Afridi
- Directed by: Saife Hassan
- Opening theme: Atif Aslam
- Composer: Sahir Ali Bagga
- Country of origin: Pakistan
- Original language: Urdu
- No. of episodes: 26

Production
- Executive producer: Momina Duraid
- Production locations: Bhogarmang Valley, Balakot
- Camera setup: Multi-camera setup
- Running time: 36–41 minutes approx.
- Production company: MD Productions

Original release
- Network: Hum TV
- Release: 9 January – 3 July 2022

Related
- Sang-e-Mar Mar

Sang-e-Mah (Urdu: سنگِ ماہ, transl. Moonstone) is a Pakistani television series, and second series in the trilogy preceded by Sang-e-Mar Mar. Having a central plot line inspired from William Shakespeare's Hamlet, it is written by Mustafa Afridi, directed by Saife Hassan and produced by Momina Duraid under her banner production MD Productions. The series revolves around the mysteries that unfold when a young man Hilmand decides to avenge the murder of his father. It focuses on the oppression of women in the form of 'ghag' (Note: a custom practiced in the tribal areas of Pakistan in which a man lays claims to a woman to marry her by force.) in tribal areas and also deals with interreligious harmony. It features an ensemble cast of Nauman Ijaz, Atif Aslam, Sania Saeed, Samiya Mumtaz and Omair Rana with Kubra Khan, Zaviyar Nauman Ijaz and Hania Aamir in supporting roles. This marks the television acting debut of Aslam who played the main role of Hilmand Khan, and sang the soundtrack of the series as well. The series had a cinematic launch on 8 January 2022, while it premiered on Hum TV on 9 January.

Sang-e-Mah earned widespread critical acclaim for the cast's performances, Aridi's script including the engaging storyline, strong characters, and impactful dialogues but was faulted for stereotypical portrayals of Pashtuns, with TRPs ranging from 4.4 to 9.3, throughout its run. At the 22nd Lux Style Awards, it won Best TV Writer and Best TV Director out of seven nominations.

== Premise ==
A transcendent tale of love and retribution.

Sang-e-Mah follows the story of a family who belong to the tribal regions of Pakistan. The drama will reveal how people have to sacrifice their lives and love because of an untruthful tradition.

== Plot ==
The story is set in the fictional town of 'Laspiraan'. Hilmand (Atif Aslam) usually spends time at the grave of his father, Nasrullah Khan. Hilmand wants to get revenge on Haji Marjaan Khan (Nauman Ijaz) because Hilmand believes Marjaan killed Nasrullah to marry Hilmand's mother Zarsanga (Samiya Mumtaz). Zarsanga and Marjaan's son and Hilmand's half-brother, Hikmat (Zaviyar Nauman Ijaz), is in love with his cousin Gul Meena (Hania Amir), daughter of Zarsanga's sister Zarghuna (Sania Saeed).

Zarghuna hates Mastan Singh (Omair Rana), since Mastan killed Zarghuna's husband Asadullah Khan. Zarghuna rejects Hikmat and Gul Meena's relationship, so Hikmat goes to do "Ghag", where he will go to Gul Meena's house and make an announcement that Gul Meena can only be Hikmat's bride. But, Zarghuna discovers that Hilmand did the Ghag instead. Mastan goes to kill Hilmand, but is stopped due to his father's death. It is revealed that Mastan's father, Hakeem Guru Baksh, gave Marjaan poison to kill Nasrullah.

Meanwhile, Sheherzaad (Kubra Khan) learns about the Ghag and comes to Laspiraan to gather research, since Sheherzaad is a reporter. When she comes to Laspiraan, she and Marjaan start bonding and she meets Hilmand, who gives Sheherzaad his blanket. Sheherzaad then remembers being harassed by her cousin Haider (Shamil Khan) when she was young. Mastan finds Hilmand and stabs him, but at the hospital, Haider and Sheherzaad reunite since Haider is now a doctor.

After seeing Haider, Sheherzaad uses the nurse's help to move Hilmand somewhere else for safety. It is also revealed that Marjaan got Zarghuna married to his servant, Awal Khan (Syed Muntazim Shah). But when he was abusive towards her, she divorced him and married Asadullah, who was Awal Khan's younger brother. Seeing Sheherzaad as his daughter, Marjaan goes to Haider's house and tells his wife the truth about Sheherzaad's past with Haider. The nurse leaks this to the hospital and Haider is arrested.

After Hilmand recovers, he calls a "jirga" (meeting) for Hikmat, who is responsible for the attack on Hilmand, even though Hilmand knows Mastan did the attack. Hilmand threatens Mastan to testify against Marjaan so Hilmand can get his revenge against Marjaan, but if Mastan doesn't, Hilmand won't let Mastan get married. So, Mastan's fiancée Harshaali Kaur (Najiba Faiz) convinces Mastan to do what Hilmand says.

At the jirga, Hilmand says Hikmat didn't do anything and Mastan says that when his father was dying, he didn't say anything about giving Marjaan poison to kill Nasrullah, but he said for Mastan to get married. Mastan also reveals that he attacked Hilmand. Zarsanga decides to go the jirga herself and decides to tell the truth there, with Sheherzaad running after her.

At the jirga, after failing to produce evidence against Marjaan, Hilmand asks Marjaan to say under oath on the hand of Shah Sab that he did not kill Nasrullah. Marjaan proceeds to do so but the moment he was to say the words, Zarsanga appears and stops Marjaan. Marjaan asks Zarsanga to go but she refuses to leave. Hilmand goes to meet her mother and tells her that Marjaan killed his father and her husband. At that moment Zarsanga reveals that she killed Nasrullah. Hilmand runs into the forests after listening to that and everyone in the jirga are shocked.

Hilmand goes to his father's village to verify what his mother has revealed as he feels that she had lied to save Marjaan. But after meeting Mashallah Khan (Asif Khan), his grandfather, the true character of his father is revealed and he is broken. Mashallah Khan on the other hand, intrigued at Hilmand's coming to meet him after all these years, sends his sons to Laspiraan to know the reason. He gets to know about the confession of Zarsanga and now starts plotting to extract hefty amounts from Marjaan. On the other hand, Sheherzaad is looking frantically looking for Hilmand. She implores him to accompany her to the city but he is completely broken and leaves the place.

Mashallah then calls another jirga on Zarsanga for killing his son Nasrullah. Zarsanga tells Sheherzaad she doesn't want to attend the jirga. The day before the jirga, Marjaan gives his turban to Hikmat, saying he should make a decision which can give everyone justice and which can save Zarsanga's respect and also make Hikmat the new Haji and the new leader of Laspiraan. At the jirga, Hikmat comes wearing the turban in Marjaan's place. Then, Zarghuna, Sheherzaad, Gul Meena, and all the other women in Laspiraan suffering Ghag arrive at the jirga.

Gul Meena then shares her Ghag story, when Hilmand arrives. Mashallah Khan says he wants a share of the money for Zarsanga's death because he wants blood for blood. But, Hilmand reveals papers for some land so he asks for a whole share and all the money from Mashallah, so he and his sons leave in silence, and the elders decide to put an end to Ghag immediately, and whoever does Ghag after this will be punished immediately. Hilmand reveals to Hikmat that the papers were fake.

Hilmand and Sheherzaad come home to find Marjaan and Zarsanga lying dead together. The night before, Marjaan and Zarsanga both decided to kill themselves to save themselves from embarrassment. Hilmand comforts a crying Sheherzaad.

A few years later, an elderly Awal Khan asks a young kid named Marjaan Khan where his father is. The young Marjaan points Awal Khan to where his father is and Awal Khan tells him that Mashallah Khan's sons have done Ghag again. The father is revealed to be Hilmand, who is now Haji Hilmand Khan, and he turns around and looks at Awal Khan, implying that Hilmand will give his uncles a good punishment.

== Cast ==
From left to right: Gul Meena (Hania Aamir), Hikmat Khan (Zaviyar Nauman Ijaz), Sheherzaad (Kubra Khan), Hilmand (Atif Aslam), Haji Marjaan Khan (Nauman Ijaz), Zarsanga (Samiya Mumtaz), Zarghuna (Sania Saeed), Mastaan Singh (Omair Rana), Harshaali Kaur (Najiba Faiz).

Name	Role	Note
Atif Aslam	Hilmand Khan	He is strong-willed and lives in cemetery with his friends whose only aim to avenge the murder of his father; based on Prince Hamlet of William Shakespeare. The letter "H" stands for both Hamlet and Hilmand.
Nauman Ijaz	Haji Marjaan Khan	Step-father of Hilmand and father of Hikmat; based on Claudius
Sania Saeed	Zarghuna	Zarsanga's sister, Gul Meena's mother and widow of Asad Ullah Khan
Samiya Mumtaz	Zarsanga	Mother of Hilmand and Hikmat and second wife of Haji Marjaan Khan; based on Gertrude
Omair Rana	Mastaan Singh	A sikh servant of Zarghuna who looks after her lands when he is accused of the murder of her husband
Kubra Khan	Sheherzaad	A newspaper journalist who comes to Laspeeran to cover the practice of 'Ghag'; based on Ophelia
Zaviyar Nauman Ijaz	Hikmat Khan	Zarsanga and Haji Marjaan Khan's son who loves Gul Meena and wants to marry her
Hania Aamir	Gul Meena	Zarghuna's daughter who loves Hikmat Khan
Najiba Faiz	Harshaali Kaur	Mastaan Singh's fiancé
Hassan Noman	Badam Gul	Servant of Zarghuna
Nadia Afgan		Sheherzaad's boss
Shamil Khan	Dr. Haider	Sheherzaad's cousin who raped her in her teenage
Muhammad Hunbal	Sabz Ali	A coward person who is a chamcha of Hilmand
Syed Muntazim Shah	Awal Khan	Haji's body guard and informer and ex-husband of Zarghuna
	Pir Yousuf Shah “Shah Sahab”	A Saint of Laspiran who lives in Dargah and Masjid. Who knows everything about the people's of Laspiran.
Asif Khan	Masha'Allah Khan	Hilmand's grandfather
Adeel Afzal	Saifullah	Hilmand's Friend

== Production ==
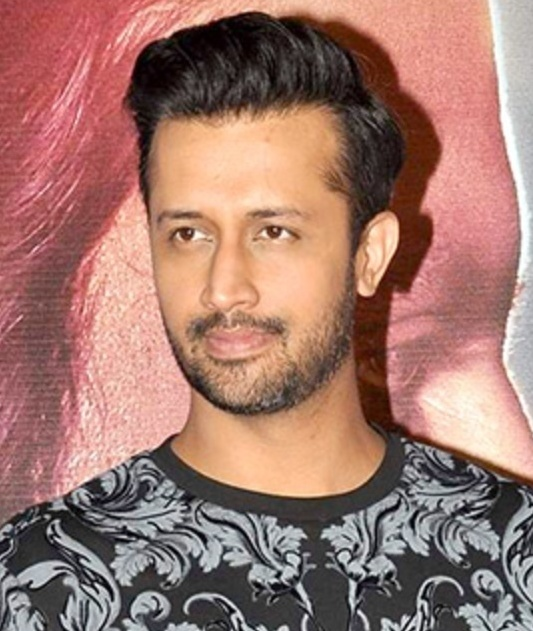
Atif Aslam made his television debut by portraying Hilmand Khan, a role based on Prince Hamlet.

In July 2021, Saife Hassan announced in an exclusive interview that he is going to revamp the Sang-e-Mar Mar with a new season. He revealed Sania Saeed, Nauman Ijaz, Kubra Khan and Samiya Mumtaz as leading actors. Hassan also announced that it will be a trilogy, and after Sang-e-Mah, he will make Sang-e-Siyah.

Saeed, Ijaz and Khan reprise their roles from Sang-e-Mar Mar while Mumtaz, Nadia Afgan and Hania Amir joined for the second season. There were also rumours of the singer Atif Aslam being part of the series; his casting was confirmed in late August 2021. Before Aslam, film actor Bilal Ashraf had been cast for the lead role of Hilmamd; however, he turned down the project due to date conflicts. Previously, the role had been rejected by Ali Zafar and Fawad Khan for unknown reasons. While discussing the story, Hassan revealed that the first part of the trilogy will focus on Pakhtoon family issues and will also tackle problematic traditions such as forced marriages.

The first teaser of the series was released on 10 December 2021.

=== Principal photography ===
The principal photography began in Islamabad on 13 August 2021. The series was shot majorly in Bhogerr Mong Valley, located near Balakot; Dadar, located near Balakot; and Shinkiari, and some regions of Azad Kashmir, where shooting was done extensively, which began in October 2021 and ended on 6 December 2021. Some of the initial sequences were filmed in the Gurdwara of Nankana Sahib, which were filmed after receiving the permission.

== Soundtrack ==
"Sang-e-Mah"

Song by Atif Aslam
- Released: 7 January 2022
- Recorded: 2021
- Length: 5:19
- Label: Hum
- Composer: Sahir Ali Bagga
- Lyricist: Fatima Najeeb
- Producer: Moomal Shunaid

Music video
- "Sang e Mah" Lyrical OST on YouTube

The official soundtrack of the series is performed by Atif Aslam on the lyrics of Fatima Najeeb with music composition by Sahir Ali Bagga.

== Reception ==
=== Critical reception ===
In late December 2021, the series received appraisal for its teasers which, promising a powerful story with larger than life characters and touch of Shakespearean tragedy. The serial had views of all teasers and trailers were as high as 8.3 Million. The News International while reviewing the first episode praised the storyline and characterisation stating that, series features an intriguing storyline and convincing characterisation. In another article, the newspaper praised the dialogues of the series by describing them as, "powerful and impactful." Aneela Khalid of Independent Urdu reviewed the first two episodes, criticizing writing of Mustafa Afridi for blurring the lines between 'ghag' and 'love', leaving viewers confused, but praised the tackling the evil custom of 'ghag' and its potential to spark change. On premiere, the series faced criticism for stereotyping Pashtuns, but Sania Saeed, the show's lead actress, has defended the series, arguing that it offers nuanced and complex portrayals of the community, avoiding caricatures and stereotypes. Mehreen Odho of DAWN Images compared it with Shakespeare's Hamlet and praised its writing and characterisation. In a review by The Friday Times published in April 2022, the reviewer praised the performances of Saeed, Aamir, Khan, Aslam and Ijaz. The on-screen chemistry of Aslam and Khan was also praised. While reviewing the last episode, The Friday Times praised the writing while noticing the female portrayal and the evolution of some characters.

=== Television ratings ===
EP	Date	TRP(s)	ref
1	9 January 2022	9.3	
2	16 January 2022	8.0	
3	23 January 2022	7.5	
4	30 January 2022	5.6	
5	6 February 2022	7.0	
6	13 February 2022	5.9	
7	20 February 2022	6.3	
8	27 February 2022	5.2	
9	6 March 2022	5.2	
10	13 March 2022	6.9	
11	12 March 2022	6.0	
12	27 March 2022	5.2	
13	3 April 2022	6.1	
14	17 April 2022	5.1	
18	8 May 2022	5.0	
22	5 June 2022	5.2	
23	12 June 2022	4.4	
24	19 June 2022	5.7	
25	26 June 2022	7.0	
26	3 July 2022	6.9	

=== YouTube Views ===
As of 23 August 2023, the first episode generated 28 Million+ views and last episode had generated 12 Million+ views on YouTube.The total views of all Episodes on YouTube are 299 million+ as of 23 August 2023.

== Accolades ==
Year	Ceremony	Category	Recipient	Result	Ref(s).
October 6, 2023	Lux Style Awards	Best TV Play	Sang-e-Mah	Nominated	
October 6, 2023	Lux Style Awards	Best TV Actor (Viewers' Choice)	Atif Aslam	Nominated	
October 6, 2023	Lux Style Awards	Best Emerging Talent in TV	Atif Aslam	Nominated	
October 6, 2023	Lux Style Awards	Best TV Director	Saife Hassan	Won	
October 6, 2023	Lux Style Awards	Best TV Writer	Mustafa Afridi	Won	
October 6, 2023	Lux Style Awards	Best TV OST	Sang-e-Mah	Nominated	
October 6, 2023	Lux Style Awards	Best Ensemble Play	Sang-e-Mah	Nominated	
October 21, 2023	IPPA Awards	Best Drama Serial	Sang-e-Mah	Nominated	
October 21, 2023	IPPA Awards	Best Director TV Serial	Saife Hassan	Won	
October 21, 2023	IPPA Awards	Best Actor Male TV Serial	Atif Aslam	Nominated	
October 21, 2023	IPPA Awards	Best Actor Female TV Serial	Hania Aamir	Won	
October 21, 2023	IPPA Awards	Best Actor Female TV Serial	Kubra Khan	Nominated	
October 21, 2023	IPPA Awards	Best Supporting Actor TV Serial	Samiya Mumtaz	Won	
October 21, 2023	IPPA Awards	Best Supporting Actor TV Serial	Sania Saeed	Nominated	
October 21, 2023	IPPA Awards	Best On-screen Couple TV Serial	Zaviyar Nauman Ijaz and Hania Aamir	Nominated	
October 21, 2023	IPPA Awards	Best On-screen Couple TV Serial	Atif Aslam and Kubra Khan	Nominated	
September 28, 2024	Hum Awards	Best Drama Serial	Sang-e-Mah	Won	
September 28, 2024	Hum Awards	Best Director Drama Serial	Saife Hassan	Won	
September 28, 2024	Hum Awards	Best Writer Drama Serial	Mustafa Afridi	Won	
September 28, 2024	Hum Awards	Best Actor	Atif Aslam	Nominated	
September 28, 2024	Hum Awards	Best Actress	Kubra Khan	Nominated	
September 28, 2024	Hum Awards	Best Actress	Hania Aamir	Nominated	
September 28, 2024	Hum Awards	Best Actor in a Negative Role	Nauman Ijaz	Nominated	
September 28, 2024	Hum Awards	Most Impactful Character	Sania Saeed	Won	
September 28, 2024	Hum Awards	Best Supporting Actor	Zaviyar Nauman Ijaz	Nominated	
September 28, 2024	Hum Awards	Best Supporting Actress	Samiya Mumtaz	Won	
September 28, 2024	Hum Awards	Best Television Sensation Male	Atif Aslam	Won	
September 28, 2024	Hum Awards	Best Original Soundtrack	Sahir Ali Bagga and Momina Duraid	Won	

== Broadcast ==
The show is distributed worldwide by the following TV channels:

- HUM TV
- HUM EUROPE
- HUM TV MENA
- HUM World
