= Rabya Kulsoom =

Pakistani television actress

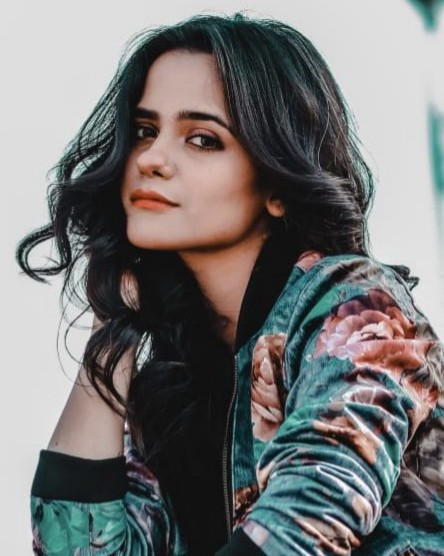
- Kulsoom during photoshoot in 2020
- Born: 21 January 1989 (age 37); Karachi, Sindh, Pakistan
- Occupation: Actress‚ model
- Years active: 2016 – present
- Spouse: Rehan Nazim (m. 2016)
- Relatives: Parveen Akbar (mother); Faizan Shaikh (brother); Maham Amir (sister-in-law)

Rabya Kulsoom is a Pakistani television and film actress. She played the role of Maria in Shehr-e-Malal. Aside from television, she has appeared in music videos like "Pyar Hua" and "Main Kashmir Hoon". She was also seen in the feature film Gawah Rehna and starred in the web series Ek Jhoothi Love Story.

== Personal life ==
She married singer Rehan Nazim, lead vocalist of the pop rock band Mirage on 14 February 2016. The couple had a son in 2021.

== Filmography ==
Key
†	Denotes film/series that have not yet been released

=== Television ===
Year	Title	Role	Network	Notes
2017	Zamani Manzil Kay Maskharay	Zainab	Geo Entertainment	
2017	Dhund	Amna	TV One	
2017	Mera Aangan	Natasha	ARY Digital	
2017	Jannat	Nadia	A-Plus TV	
2018	Ishq Bepanah	Asiya	Express TV	
2018	Tere Naal Luv Hogaya	Sumbul	Play Entertainment	
2018	Haara Dil	Abeer	A-Plus TV	
2018	Dilara	Choti	Bol Network	
2019	Choti Choti Batain	Zara	Hum TV	Episode "Roop"
2019	Zara Sambhal Kay	Adeena	A-Plus TV	
2019	Meer Abru	Sana	Hum TV	
2020	Shehr-e-Malal	Maria	Express TV	
2020-2021	Bharaas	Sasha	ARY Digital	
2022–23	Fraud	Maila	ARY Digital	
2022–23	Farq	Bano	Geo TV	
2022–23	Mujhe Pyaar Hua Tha	Neelo	ARY Digital	
2023	Mannat Murad	Azra	Geo Entertainment	
2024	Tera Waada	Maria	ARY Digital	
2024-2025	Bharam	Ramsha	ARY Digital	

=== Web ===
Year	Title	Role	Production	Notes
2018	Rukhsati		Teeli	
2018	Gora Complex		Teeli	
2020	Mr. Black		Nashpati Prime	
2020	Eid Pe Kya Pehnugi	Mina	Nashpati Prime	Short film
2020	Ek Jhoothi Love Story			Mehreen Jabbar's web series

=== Film ===
Year	Title	Role	Notes
2020	Gawah Rehna †	Chandni	Pakistani–Turkish Joint Venture; Filming

=== Music video ===
Year	Title	Artist	Notes
2016	Pyar Hua	Rehan Nazim	
2019	Main Kashmir Hoon	Rehan Nazim & Nimra Rafiq	
2020	Daro Na	Abdullah Qureshi	
