= Farah Mahbub =

Farah Mahbub is the name of:

- Farah Mahbub (judge) (born 1966), Bangladeshi judge
- Farah Mahbub (photographer) (born 1965), Pakistani photographer
