= Muhammad Faizan Sheikh =

Pakistani actor

Faizan Sheikh
- Born: 5 September 1997 (age 28); Karachi, Sindh, Pakistan
- Education: SZABIST University
- Occupations: Actor‚ model, host
- Years active: 2012–present
- Known for: Ready Steady Go as Pyaare; Main aur Tum 2.0; Saaya as Sajid
- Spouse: Maham Aamir (m. 2018)
- Children: 1
- Mother: Parveen Akbar
- Relatives: Rabya Kulsoom (sister)

Faizan Sheikh is a Pakistani actor who appears in television series and films. He is known for appearing in various comical, romantic, antagonist and supporting roles. Currently, Sheikh is hosting The Mazedar Show on TV One and also appearing as a co-host with Faysal Qureshi on ARY Zindagi's morning show Salam Zindagi.

== Career ==
Faizan started his career as a model, and soon made his acting debut on television. He acted in theatre and gradually had roles in television. Sheikh played lead role in the play You Only Marry Twice. He performed the character of Yar Baloch in the play Lakhon Main Teen. He also performed the lead role of Romeo in the play Sorry Juliet, Paaro loves Romeo.

He started his drama career by playing a supporting role in Geo TV's drama serial Mann Ke Moti. He has also worked in drama serials such as Riffat Aapa ki Bahuein, and appeared in a lead role in Mera Naam Yousuf Hai, alongside Imran Abbas. He had the lead role of Pyaare in the sitcom Ready Steady Go. He has also worked in a lead role in ARY Digital drama Main aur Tum 2.0. He also worked in the ARY Digital drama Mera Aangan.

Faizan Sheikh has also had roles in films, which include the role of Muneer in the film Maalik (2016). The following year, he appeared in the film Parchi.

Faizan is a co-host on ARY Zindagi's morning show Salam Zindagi. In 2018, he played the lead role of Sajid in the Geo Entertainment supernatural drama serial Saaya, along with Sohail Sameer. He is currently hosting The Mazedar Show along with Aadi Adeel on TV One.

== Personal life ==
Shaikh is the son of veteran television actress Parveen Akbar and brother of Rabya Kulsoom. He married co-actor Maham Aamir in 2018 with whom he has work in renowned comedy show Ready Steady Go. The couple became parents of a daughter in 2021.

== Filmography ==
Key
†	Denotes film/serial that have not yet been released

=== Film ===
Year	Title	Role	Notes
2016	Maalik	Muneer	Supporting
2018	Parchi	Biscuit	Supporting
2019	Heer Maan Ja	Wajdaan	Negative Role
2021	Udham Patakh	TBA	Upcoming

=== Television ===
Year	Show	Role	Channel
2012	Mann Ke Moti	Ashfaq	Geo Entertainment
2014	Mera Naam Yousuf Hai	Wali	A-Plus TV
2015	Riffat Appa Ki Bahuein	Aslam	ARY Digital
2015	Main Kamli	Aslam	Aaj Entertainment
2016	Bhatti & DD	DD	TV One
2016	Bache Baraye Farokht	Jahanzaib	Urdu 1
2016	Dil e Barbaad	Minhaaj	ARY Digital
2017	Mera Angan	Furqaan	ARY Digital
2017	Ghairat	Adnan	ARY Digital
2017	Main Aur Tum 2.0	Faizan	ARY Digital
2017-2020	Ready Steady Go	Pyaare	Play Entertainment
2018	Saaya	Sajid	Geo Entertainment
2018	Ab Dekh Khuda Kya Karta Hai	Kashif	Geo Entertainment
2018	Babban Khala Ki Betiyan	Guddu	ARY Digital
2018	Namak Paray	Jawad	ARY Digital
2020	Gustakh	Shahmeer	Express Entertainment
2020	Hamaray Dada Ki Wasiyat	Ali	Express Entertainment
2021	Pyaar Aur Kirayedar	Asad	Telefilm on LTN Family
2021	The Mazedaar Show	Host	TVOne Global
2021	Get Set Go	Pyaare	TVOne Global
2021	Jeem Chay	Jerry	Express Entertainment
2022	Tum Kahan Jao Gay		Express Entertainment
2022	Charagar		Aaj Entertainment
2023	Guddu Ka Gharana	Guddu	LTN Family
2023	Meray Hi Rehna	Farhan	ARY Digital
2023	Tamasha (Season 2)	Contestant	ARY Digital
2024	Rafta Rafta		Green Entertainment
