= Saira Sheikh =

Pakistani artist

Saira Sheikh (1975-2017) was an artist who was head of the liberal arts program at the Indus Valley School of Art and Architecture (IVS), where she also taught as an associate professor. She created multiple artworks, most of which were created with Omer Wasim, a visual artist.

== Personal life ==
Sheikh was born in Karachi, Pakistan in 1975. She was educated at Kinnaird College in Lahore, Punjab, Pakistan, where she received a B.A. in English literature and psychology in 1995. After receiving the degree she worked as the curator and gallery manager at Rohtas 2, an art gallery in Pakistan. She went on to receive a B.F.A. from the National College of Arts (NCA) and an EdM in art and art education from the Teachers College at Columbia University in New York City.

During 2017, Sheikh was diagnosed with cancer, which led to her death on August 13 of the same year. Prior to her death Sheikh had one child, her son Sikandar.

== Career ==
After receiving her teaching degree Sheikh returned to Karachi, where she became an associate professor and head of the liberal arts program at the Indus Valley School of Art and Architecture. While working at the school Sheikh met colleague Omer Wasim, who would be a large influence on her art and with whom she would collaborate heavily.

Sheikh was considered a pioneer in the founding of the field of art education in Pakistan. She helped to co-found the art education program at the School of Visual Arts and Design, Beaconhouse National University (SVAD-BNU), the country's only program of art education.

== Artwork ==
Sheikh created the majority of her art with Wasim, as their artistic vision aligned significantly. Political messages and activism, particularly Pakistani political climates and situations, were strong influences in their art, through which they wished to challenge the conventional methods by which art engagement occurs. The two believed that as artists, it was important for them to play their part and record the history and movements occurring around their surroundings. Specific influences in their art included the Western political interests in Pakistan and how their influence and power are modifying Pakistan and the economic disparities they saw within Karachi, Pakistan, contrasting the poorest parts of the city with the richest.

When creating Mirror Mirror on the Wall, the two intended that it “questions the idea of a maker; where the artist is not making anything, and instead, the viewers become the makers. In fact, this particular work questions all notions of making; the subject, maker, spectator and the gaze. Everything turns upside down”. The art features two women overlapped over each other. Her mouth isn't drawn and other features are barely visible. Other artworks include The Optics of Labor.

After Sheikh's death in 2017 Wasim stated that he would continue to complete projects that the two had planned together.

=== Methods ===
When creating artwork Sheikh would often take an issue found in politics or within social boundaries and view it in a different perspective, after which she would reflect on the issue with her peers. She would then transform this into her art.

== Awards and honors ==
Sheikh was selected for various awards from her education and was selected to participate in many experimental artist programs.

== Exhibitions ==
=== Solo and with Wasim ===
- “Up Close and Personal” at Rohtas 2 in Lahore (2004, solo)
- [Unstated] at Canvas Gallery in Karachi (2016, with Wasim)
- “Optics of Labour” at Koel Gallery in Karachi (2017, with Wasim)
- [Unstated] at Cairo Video Festival (2017, with Wasim)
- Drawing documents at IVS Gallery (2017, released posthumously, with Wasim)
- "Sweeping Back the Sea" at Aicon Gallery, New York (2018, released posthumously, with Wasim)

=== Group shows ===
- “Mirror Mirror on the Wall” at Rohtas 2 in Lahore (2012, performance)
- “Artist Statement” at CICA Museum in Gimp, South Korea (2016, group)
