= Ishrat Made in China =

2022 Pakistani film by Mohib Mirza

- Theatrical poster
- Directed by: Mohib Mirza
- Written by: Ahsan Raza Firdousi
- Screenplay by: Mohib Mirza
- Produced by: Mohib Mirza
- Starring: Mohib Mirza; Sanam Saeed; Sara Loren; HSY
- Cinematography: Rana Kamran
- Edited by: Nasir Ghani
- Music by: Various (see below); Shani Arshad (score)
- Production companies: Ek Alif Films; Eleven Eleven Films
- Distributed by: Mintrio; Geo Films; Eveready Pictures
- Release date: 3 March 2022
- Country: Pakistan
- Language: Urdu
- Budget: 14-15 crore
- Box office: 0.65 crore

Ishrat Made in China is a 2022 Pakistani romantic action comedy film, co-written, produced and directed as a debut by Mohib Mirza, who also stars as the titled character Ishrat. The film was also co-directed by Parmesh Adiwal and Tehseen Khan. The film is a spin-off of the 2006 television comedy series "Ishrat Baji", also starring Mohib Mirza. The film was released on 3 March 2022 under the banners of Ek Alif Films and Eleven Eleven Films, while distributed by Geo Films and Eveready Pictures. It received negative reviews, and was a box office disaster.

== Plot ==
The film is about a young man named Ishrat (Mohib), who goes to China in order to fulfill his dream. He then gets into some mishaps against the tyrant of a local gang.

== Cast ==
- Mohib Mirza as Ishrat
- Sanam Saeed as Akhtar
- Sara Loren as Jia
- HSY as Master Mangshi
- Shamoon Abbasi as Master BP
- Mani as Naushad / Chunke
- Ali Kazmi as Shamshad / Chun
- Mustafa Chaudhry as Dilshad / Li
- Imam Syed as Jee
- Shabbir Jan as Inspector Saab
- Nayyar Ejaz as Principal
- Parveen Akbar as Ishrat's Mom
- Laila Wasti as Nilofer
- Urooj Abbas as Minister Diesel Chandio
- Amir Yameen as Sabzi Wala
- Tara Mahmood as Neighbour
- Osama Bin Atiq as Sallu
- Ahsan Raza Firdousi as Ittefaq Ul Haq
- Faiza Saleem as Marjan
- Ramsha Akmal as Sheen
- Waseem Hassan Sheikh as Mr. Excuse Me
- Akhlaque Mahesar as Waderay Ka Beta
- Aadi Adeal Amjad as 1st Race Commentator
- Abis Raza as Barey Hakim Sahab
- Zarmeena Ikram as 1st Girl Accompanying Master Mangshi

The three actors above have played Dual role. Additionally, Aadi Adeal Amjad, Waqar Zaka, Faiza Saleem, Amir Yameen, Waseem Hassan Sheikh, Parveen Akbar, Zarmeena Ikram, Osama Bin Atiq, Tara Mahmood, Akhlaque Mahesar, Ramsha K. Akmal, and Abis Raza appear. (Note: Cast extracted from Sanam Saeed's post on Instagram)

== Production ==
Mohib Mirza announced on 20 January 2019 that he began the production of his new film, titled Ishrat Made in China. Script writer Ahsan Raza Firdousi revealed that the film has bits of Mirza's 2006 television series Ishrat Baji, but in completely different universe. The first filming spell was completed before March 2019 in Karachi, during which he performed his stunts himself and got injuries as well. A well physical training was received by him, including HSY and Sara Loren.

Ishrat will be my directorial debut […] The film has action, comedy and romance […] It's a passion project that I have been thinking of working on for long.

~ Mohib Mirza to The News

Second filming spell took place during 2 to 24 March 2020. While some of the cast and crew flew in there in late-February, and flew back on 18 March, a team of 21 members were stuck at a hotel in Kanchanaburi and they couldn't move to Bangkok for a safe travel due to the COVID-19 pandemic in Thailand. After a wrap-up of principal photography, the flight was being delayed from 25 March due to closure of airports, until 14 April 2020 when they flew back to Islamabad on a special flight of Pakistan International Airlines. After safely testing negative for the virus, they traveled in a bus to Karachi for post-production phase, thus utilizing an extra budget.

The soundtrack has been composed by Simaab Sen, Sami Khan, Shany Haider, and Talha Dar, while the former two are also lyricists along with Amit G and Ahmed Murtaza. The singers include Ali Noor, Sami Khan, Nayantara Rashmeet, Asad Raza Sonu, and Mohsin Afzal Sain. Action directors include Mehboob Shah, Pradit Seeluem, and David Simone. Rana Kamran has done the cinematography, while Shani Arshad performed the background score. (Note: Credits extracted from the Film trailer on YouTube)

== Soundtrack ==
Ishrat Made in China

Soundtrack album by various artists
- Recorded: 2019–21
- Language: Urdu; English
- Label: Geo

| No. | Title | Lyrics | Music | Singer(s) | Length |
|---|---|---|---|---|---|
| 1. | "TickTalk" | Sami Khan | Simaab Sen | Rashmeet, Asad Raza Sonu |
| 2. | "Ishrat Aaya Re" | Ahmed Murtaza | Talha Dar | Ahmed Murtaza |
| 3. | "Raado Laado Parado" | Shani Haider, Mohib Mirza | Shani Haider | Shani Haider |
| 4. | "Kaash" | Simaab Sen, Amit G | Simaab Sen | Nayantara Bhatkal |
| 5. | "Mangshi" | Sami Khan | Sami Khan | Sami Khan, Mohsin Afzal Hussain |
| 6. | "Yaad Aounga" (Slowburn Remix) | Sami Khan | Sami Khan | Sami Khan |

== Release ==
The names of the cast were officially revealed in June 2020, while being reported earlier also. After delays due to the COVID-19 pandemic in Pakistan, the teaser was released on 17 December 2021, and the official trailer on 13 February 2022.

The film premiered on 2 March in Neuplex Cinemas, Karachi, while it released on 3 March 2022 everywhere.
