= Sami Khan (child actor) =

Pakistani male child actor

- سمیع خان
- Born: 18 February 2008 (age 18); Karachi, Pakistan
- Occupation: Actor
- Years active: 2016–present

Sami Khan (Urdu: سمیع خان) is a Pakistani child actor. He is known for his role as DJ (Jiya's younger brother) in Suno Chanda for which he received Hum Awards for Best Child Actor. In 2019, Khan appeared in the film Heer Maan Ja.

== Career ==
Sami has appeared in several advertisements and television serials. He got recognition after his appearance as DJ in the critically acclaimed 2018 TV series Suno Chanda. He reprised his role in the sequel Suno Chanda 2. His other appearances include Woh Aik Pal and Tum Kon Piya. In 2019, he appeared in sitcom Dolly Darling and film Heer Maan Ja, co-featuring Hareem Farooq and Ali Rehman Khan.

== Filmography ==
=== Television ===
Year	Title	Role	Notes	Refs
2016	Tum Kon Piya	Afnan		
2018	Suno Chanda	Danial Nazakat Ali (DJ)	Hum Award for Best Child Actor	
2019	Suno Chanda 2	Danial Nazakat Ali (DJ)		
2019	Dolly Darling	Junior		
2019	Jadugaryan	Rohan		
2019	Makafaat		Episode 20	
2020	Dikhawa		Episode "Parvarish & "Salami"	
2020	Makafaat (season 2)		Episode "Nashukri"	
2021	Chaudhry and Sons	Behzaad		
2024	Burns Road Kay Romeo Juliet	Bilal (Billu)	ARY Digital	
2024	Shiddat	Shayan	Geo TV	
2024	Kaffara	Sitara's brother	Geo TV	
2024	Iqtidar	Zeeshan "Shani" Shehroz	Green TV	

=== Film ===
Year	Film	Role	Note	Ref.
2019	Heer Maan Ja		Feature film	
