= Mojiz Hasan =

Pakistani film and theatre actor

- Born: Karachi, Pakistan
- Occupation: Actor
- Years active: 2017–present

Mojiz Hasan is a Pakistani theatre and film actor. He has appeared in several notable theatre plays and feature films. In 2019, he played a role of Jerry in Azfar Jafri's Heer Maan Ja opposite Hareem Farooq and Ali Rehman Khan. Mojiz Hasan is known for his comedy, his acting skills are natural. As per the big stars of Lollywood, "Mojiz Hasan is the real actor, he is what he is". "His acting skills are natural, he is the same in real life and off the camera". Mojiz Hasan started his career as a stage actor for some well known stage shows written by Pakistan's biggest star "Anwar Maqsood". After his stage shows Mojiz Hasan become famous for his acting skills and in 2018 he signed up for his first featured film "Parchi". His comedy character was highlighted so much that in the year 2019 and 2021 "Mojiz Hasan" signed 2 more films. He is also a gold medalist from Indus Valley School of Arts. Mojiz Hasan completed his graduation in the year 2016 in Communication Design and was awarded the Alumni Award.

Mojiz currently works as the head of Marketing in the food industry in Dubai since 2023.

== Filmography ==
=== Film ===
Year	Title	Role	Co-actors	Ref(s)
2021	Khel Khel Mein	Pervaiz, Student, Group Friend	Sajal Aly, Bilal Abbas Khan	
2018	Parchi	Virgo	Hareem Farooq, Ahmed Ali Akbar, Ali Rehman, Usman Mukhtar	
2019	Heer Maan Ja	Jerry; Kabir's best friend	Hareem Farooq, Ali Rehman Khan	
2019	Laal Kabootar	Cameo	Mansha Pasha, Ahmed Ali Akbar	

=== Television ===
Year	Title	Role
2020	Hamaray Dada Ki Wasiyat	Jumma
2020	Mera Maan Rakhna	Faris
2021	Masters	Aryan
2021	Dobara	Babar

=== Theatre ===
Year	Title	Role	Theatre	Ref(s)
2016	Parwaney		NAPA, Karachi	
2017	Sawa 14 August	Bangali	NAPA, Karachi	
2018	Pawnay 14 August		NAPA, Karachi	
2020	Doodh Ka Jala	Nanha	Karachi Arts Council	
