= Saaya season 1 =

Pakistani television drama series

Saaya
- Season 1
- Poster featuring Maham Amir as Ghost
- Starring: Maham Amir; Sohail Sameer; Kiran Tabeer; Faizan Shaikh
- No. of episodes: Season 1: 70 (64 on Geo Kahani); Season 2: 44

Release
- Original network: Geo TV
- Original release: 21 March – 21 November 2018

Season chronology
- Next → Season 2

Saaya is a 2018 Pakistani horror drama television series directed by Syed Muhammad Khurram, produced by Babar Javed and written by Wajeeha Sahar. The drama stars Maham Amir, Sohail Sameer and Kiran Tabeer in lead roles, and premiered on Geo Entertainment. The theme of the series is karma.

In 2021, serial was released on the network's sister channel Geo Kahani. Its second season titled "Saaya 2" premiered on 6 May 2022, on Geo Entertainment. The second season stars Mashal Khan, Momina Iqbal and Danial Afzal Khan.

== Plot ==
The drama revolves around a girl named Sauleha who lives with her husband Rashid and his family. Sauleha is pressured by her mother-in-law to give birth to a son if she wishes to continue living in the house. Sauleha has two daughters and becomes pregnant with a boy, who is exchanged at birth with a girl by a nurse, Qayoom who is desperate for a son. The mother-in-law is forced to keep Sauleha in the house by Rashid but the mother does not give up and so she and her niece do black magic on her making Sauleha have a mental illness and then make a plan to kill Sauleha. They push her off the roof and state that she killed herself. Rashid is forced to marry Saba but he does not accept her as his wife but Saba does not like it. Sauleha starts to haunt the people in the house and once everyone knows about the supernatural presence they stay aware but Sauleha disturbs Saba and Rashid thinks that Saba has an illness. Sauleha continues to haunt the people in the house protecting her daughters and soon reaches out to Qayoom and decides to irritate her.

== Series overview ==
Season	No. of episodes	Originally broadcast (Pakistan)	
Season	No. of episodes	First episode	Last episode
1	70	21 March 2018	21 November 2018
2	44	6 May 2022	18 June 2022

== Cast ==
=== Main ===
- Maham Amir as Sauleha
- Sohail Sameer as Rashid
- Kiran Tabeir as Saba
- Faizan Shaikh as Sajid
- Mizna Waqas as Raheela
- Ghana Ali as Maheen

=== Recurring ===
- Sumbul Shahid as Ateeqa: Rashid, Sajid and Shela's mother
- Hajra Khan as Shela: Rashid and Sajid's sister
- Saleem Iqbal as Hamid: Rashid, Sajid and Shela's father
- Saleem Mairaj as Shams: a spiritual scholar
- Falaq Naz as Rafiqa: Saba's mother
- Usman Patel as Ishaq: Saba's brother and Maheen's husband
- Sana Pervaiz as Ghana: Saba's friend and Sajid's wife
- Sana Humayun as Dr. Areesha
- Wahaj Ahmed as Qayuum: Raheela's husband
- Zulfikar Ali as Waseem: Shela's husband
- Salma Qadir as Rifat: Shela's mother-in-law
- Vasia Fatima

=== Child cast ===
- Khushi Maheen as Pinky: Rashid/Sauleha's second daughter
- Bakhtawar Rasheed as Guriya: Rashid/Sauleha's first daughter
- Anabia as Shafaq: Rashid/Sauleha"s third daughter but actually is Qayum/Raheela's daughter
- Sameer as Ahsan: Shela/Waseem's son
- Sania Zehra as Laraib: (Qayum/Raheela's first daughter
- Hoorain as Manahil: Qayum/Raheela's second daughter
- Alizay as Sidra: Qayum/Raheela's third daughter
- Akbar as Akbar: Qayum/Raheela's fourth son who is actually Rashid/Sauleha's son who the nurse swapped with their daughter

== Production ==
In September 2017, Syed Mohammad Khurram started shooting officially for his horror series "Jinn" which changed to "Saaya" afterwards. Faysal Manzoor headed the project whereas Wajiha Sehar written the script for the series. Shooting for the series started in September 2017 and it had to be launched in January 2018 but due to nikah of two stars of the series Maham Amir and Faizan Shaikh, shooting and editing was interrupted. Later it was launched in March 2018.

It was slated to go off air after 55 episodes but due to positive reviews and feedbacks, it was extended with new storyline which was produced by Erfan Ghanchi of Blue Eye Entertainment who previously produced Naagin. Lollywood actress Ghana Ali joined the cast on extension. The serial was concluded on 21 November 2018 with a two hour long episode.

== Release ==
The series was announced to premiere on 7 March 2018 but was delayed due to editing issues and premiered on 21 March on Wednesday at 9:00 pm. It airs thrice a week with the duration of one hour. The drama was previously titled as ‘Jin’ but changed afterward. During Ramadan, the channel reduced its running time to half an hour from 9:15 pm to 9:50 pm. From 20 June it returned to Wednesday to Friday at 9:00 pm with one-hour episodes, but after extension the show aired on Wednesday 9:00 pm due to delay in shooting issues. The series was among the top horror shows of 2018.

== Sequel ==
In December 2021, it was revealed that Season 2 of Saaya is in production starring Wajiha Khan Durrani, Mizna Waqas, Inaya Khan, Naveed Raza, Zainab Qayyum as initial cast members of the show. Later, Momina Iqbal, Mashal Khan were revealed as female leads. Sohail Sameer, Maham Aamir and Saleem Mairaj reprise their roles from the first season. It was released on 6 May 2022 on Geo Entertainment.
