= Dolly Darling =

- Genre: Sitcom; Humour
- Written by: Muhammad Younis Butt
- Directed by: Iftikhar Iffi
- Starring: Nadia Khan; Aijaz Aslam; Uroosa Siddiqui
- Country of origin: Pakistan
- Original language: Urdu
- No. of seasons: 1
- No. of episodes: 68

Production
- Producers: Abdullah Kadwani; Asad Qureshi
- Production locations: Karachi, Sindh
- Camera setup: Multi-camera setup
- Production company: 7th Sky Entertainment

Original release
- Network: Geo TV
- Release: 7 May 2019 – 16 February 2020

Dolly Darling is a Pakistani sitcom series produced by Abdullah Kadwani and Asad Qureshi under 7th Sky Entertainment. It features Nadia Khan, Aijaz Aslam, Uroosa Siddiqui, and Ali Rizvi in pivotal roles.

== Synopsis ==
Dolly Darling revolves around Dolly, a drama queen and an extrovert woman who lives with her husband who is an ad director but is completely different in nature. Dolly's extravagant and bubbling personality bothers her husband all the time and he keeps on finding ways to avoid her. Dolly, being obsessively in love with her husband, makes him uncomfortable in certain situations. Every time Dolly goes an extra mile to get her husband's attention and love, she fails to make an impression on him for one reason or another. Dolly eventually makes a plan to become a real-life heroine, Dolly Darling, to win over her husband.

== Cast ==
=== Main cast ===
- Nadia Khan as Dolly
- Aijaz Aslam as Mustaqeem
- Uroosa Siddiqui as Bemisaal
- Ali Rizvi as Andesha

=== Recurring cast ===
- Jia Ali as Love Guru
- Paras Masroor as Shahrukh
- Ismail Tara as Mehmood
- Rashid Farooqui as Namkeen
- Mizna Waqas as Rabia; Beautician/Pinky's fake mother
- Sami Khan as Junior
- Fareeha Jabeen as Inspector Dareena
- Shehnaz Pervaiz as Pammi Aunty / Dolly's mother
- Hareem Farooq as Hareem (Eid special episode, for the promotion of her film Heer Maan Ja)
- Ali Rehman Khan as Ali (Eid special episode, for the promotion of his film Heer Maan Ja)
- Shameen Khan as Madam KK
- Maham Amir as Mano (Dolly's friend)
- Kashif Mehmood as Uncle
- Faryal Mehmood as Pinky
- Ahmed Hassan as Jawad (Mano's Husband)
- Syed Sharjeel Mehmood as Kekra Sahab
- Adla Khan as Mansooba
- Asim Mehmood as Munasib
- Aruba Mirza as Nisha
- Raza Zaidi as Chuchu
- Fareeda Shabbir as Doctor Deegi
- Srha Asghar as Sofia
- Aiza Awan as Gori
- Hasan Noman as Gori's husband
- Ali Anwar as Tahir
- Irfan Motiwala as Mamu
- Hira Hussain
- Amir Qureshi
- Farah Nadir as Inspector Zareena
- Sonia Rao as Inspector Parveen Chitti
- Humaira Bano as Dolly's friend mother
- Jinaan Hussain as Salma
- Namrah Shahid
- Ayaz Samoo as Chintu

== Soundtrack ==
The original soundtrack of Dolly Darling was sung and composed by Faakhir Mehmood while the lyrics are by S. K. Khalish.
