= Saaya season 2 =

Pakistani drama TV series

Saaya
- Season 2
- Starring: Mashal Khan; Momina Iqbal; Danial Afzal Khan; Naveed Raza; Hareem Sohail; Asim Mehmood
- No. of episodes: 44

Release
- Original network: Geo Entertainment
- Original release: 6 May – 18 June 2022

Season chronology
- ← Previous; Season 1

Saaya 2 is a 2022 Pakistani horror drama television series directed by Sami Sani, produced by Erfan Ghanchi. It serves as a sequel to the 2018 drama Saaya. The drama stars Mashal Khan, Momina Iqbal, Danial Afzal Khan, and Naveed Raza in lead roles, whereas Sohail Sameer, Saleem Mairaj, Maham Amir, Mizna Waqas make their comeback from the first season. The season premiered on 6 May 2022 on Geo Entertainment.

== Cast ==
=== Main characters ===
- Maham Amir as Sauleha
- Sohail Sameer as Rashid
- Mashal Khan as Laila aka Pinky; Rashid/Sualeha daughter having feelings for Feroz unaware of the fact that he's a jinn
- Momina Iqbal as Guriya; Rashid/Sualeha daughter
- Hareem Sohail as Laiba; Sajid/Ghana daughter
- Danial Afzal Khan as Feroze; a jinn who falls in love with Laila
- Naveed Raza as Talal; a blind exorcist helping Rashid's family to deal with Jinn
- Inaya Khan as Sidra; Raheela's third daughter who likes Hassan and is jealous of his relation with Guriya
- Haris Waheed as Ahsan; Rashid's nephew who is adamant on marrying Guriya
- Mizna Waqas as Raheela
- Saleem Mairaj as Shams; a spiritual scholar

=== Supporting characters ===
- Shahzar Sani as Shariq; Rashid/Saba son
- Maria Naqvi as Ghana; Sajid's widow who has brought up and taken care of Rashid's children Guriya, Pinky and Shariq along with her own daughter Laiba
- Wajiha Khan as Laraib; Raheela eldest daughter
- Benazir Khan as Manahil; Raheela second daughter
- Esha Usman as Shafaq; Raheela youngest daughter
- Asim Mehmood as Hassan; Guriya's fiance and love interest
- Ayesha Khan as Rafia; Hassan's mother
- Hammad Shoaib as Arib; Hassan's brother doing specialization in London
- Naina as Vishal; Hassan's sister
- Sabiha Hashmi as Riffat; Ahsan's grand mother
- Sabahat Ali Bukhari as Naila
- Asad Zaman Khan as Shahnawaz
- Ruby Butt as Anaya
- Jinaan Hussain as Nilofar
- Beena Chaudhary as Rabiya
- Awais Khalid as Karcha
- Anam Tanveer as Dr Areesha
- Mehboob Sultan as SHO Abdul Nabi Khokar; police inspector in-charge of investigating Hassan's murder
- Rauf Bhutta as Zaidi
- Ibrahim as Rafi
- Sami Sani as Baba Sahil
- Urooj Kazmi as Noor; maid at Rashid's house who experiences paranormal activities
- Fauzia Raj as Samina
- Kiran as Shabana
- Uzair as Khizar

=== Guest appearance ===
- Kiran Tabeer as Saba; Rashid's second wife, appears in flashbacks and memories
