= Parchi (film) =

2018 Pakistani film by Azfar Jafri

- Urdu: پرچی
- Directed by: Azfar Jafri
- Written by: Shafqat Khan
- Produced by: Imran Kazmi; Hareem Farooq; Arif Lakhani
- Starring: Hareem Farooq; Ali Rehman Khan; Usman Mukhtar; Shafqat Cheema; Ahmed Ali Akbar; Shafqat Khan; Faizan Shaikh; Mojiz Hasan; Mahenur Haider
- Cinematography: Usman Mukhtar
- Edited by: Mitesh Soni
- Music by: Sahara; Manj Musik; Nindy Kaur; Ahmed Ali
- Production company: IRK Films
- Distributed by: ARY Films
- Release date: 5 January 2018 (Pakistan)
- Running time: 137 min
- Country: Pakistan
- Language: Urdu
- Budget: Rs. 4.30 crore (US$150,000)
- Box office: Rs. 17.10 crore (US$610,000)

Parchi (Urdu: پرچی, transl. Chit) is a 2018 Pakistani Urdu-language crime comedy film directed by Azfar Jafri and produced by Imran Kazmi and Arif Lakhani under the banner IRK Films. The film stars Hareem Farooq, Ali Rehman Khan and Shafqat Cheema, with Ahmed Ali Akbar, Faiza Saleem, Shafqat Khan and Usman Mukhtar in supporting roles. Khan also wrote film whilst Usman Mukhtar managed cinematography; Farooq also produced the film. It was released and distributed by ARY Films on 5 January 2018.

== Plot ==
"Parchi" is a Pakistani comedy film that follows the misadventures of a group of friends in Karachi. The plot revolves around a prank gone wrong, which leads to a series of chaotic events. The friends accidentally cross paths with a local gangster, and their lives take unexpected turns.

Eman, played by Hareem Farooq, and her friends, including Bash (Ali Rehman Khan) and Saqlain (Ahmed Ali Akbar), become embroiled in a world of crime, extortion, and danger. They must find a way to navigate this treacherous situation and outsmart the gangster who is after them.

As the story unfolds, "Parchi" combines elements of comedy, suspense, and action to depict the challenges and predicaments the friends face as they attempt to escape the consequences of their actions. The film explores themes of friendship, redemption, and the unexpected twists life can take when a seemingly harmless prank spirals out of control.

== Cast ==
- Hareem Farooq as Eman
- Ali Rehman Khan as Bash
- Shafqat Cheema as Zodiac
- Ahmed Ali Akbar as Saqlain
- Usman Mukhtar as Bilal
- Shafqat Khan as Bhola
- Faiza Saleem as Sumera
- Faizan Shaikh as Biscuit
- Mahenur Haider as Natasha
- Mojiz Hasan as Virgo
- Muhammad Usman Malik as Zain

Cameo Appearance

Syra Shehroz

== Production ==
=== Development and casting ===
In March 2016; producer Imran Kazmi in an interview with The Express Tribune revealed that his production team had begun with the film's pre-production, and with the intention to begin shooting for the film in October 2016. He confirmed that the script had been finalised. He also told that he would be co-producing with Hareem Farooq who will also play as one of the leads in the film alongside Ali Rehman and Usman Mukhtar.

=== Filming ===
Some of the filming for the film was done in Islamabad in the outskirts of the city. A night scene was shot in an old factory of an industrial zone, in very late hours of the night. Usman Mukhtar who in addition plays one of the lead characters in the film, managed the cinematography of the film.

== Release ==
The film's trailer was released on 2 December 2017 and the film released across Pakistan on 5 January 2018. Parchi was the first Pakistani movie to be released in Saudi cinemas.

=== Box office ===
The film opened in Pakistan to about Rs. 90 lakh in its first day, made up to Rs. 3 crore in its first weekend, and managed to collect up to Rs. 4.5 crore within a week. Per reports, The film grossed Rs. 9.5+ crore approx nationwide, making the total gross figures up to Rs. 11.5 crore in a month. The film ended its run at Rs. 17.1 crores worldwide.

== Reception ==
=== Critical reception ===
The film was premiered in Karachi on 3 January 2018. Iman Zia of MangoBaaz said, "while it isn't an entire failure, the film is not as forgettable as I had expected". Shahjehan Saleem of Something Haute rated 2.5 out of 5 stars and said, "Sadly its shortcomings let it down […] If the film has one thing going for it, it's the acting." Sonia Ashraf of DAWN Images and said, "Parchi is not a film without flaws but it has some redeemable qualities that make it worth a watch." Shahjahan Khurram of Samaa TV rated 2 out of 5 stars and said, "there were flashes of commendable performance in the flick but by and large, it failed to fire on all cylinders." Buraq Shabbir of The News International said, "The good thing is that Parchi has been shot very well, with good camera work and an exciting cast but unfortunately it falls flat in terms of plot and character development."

Rahul Aijaz of The Express Tribune rated 2.5 out of 5 stars and said, "Even with a lot going on in its favour, it's a forgettable film." For Daily Times, Haider Rifaat rated 4 out of 5 stars and praised it, "The fun driven film is a family entertainer for sure and manages to tease and thrill simultaneously." Saira Agha praised its cinematography but said, "Good actors cannot save a bad film and the same fate is met by Parchi." Ally Adnan praised only 3 actors, while he wrote that "Parchi will not blow anyone's mind"; adding "the 'Mummy Daddy Burger Film' genre does not consider originality and innovation to be a virtue" and it too borrows the ideas from "more than 20 films". Umair Sohail of Dunya News rated 3 out of 5 stars and said that it is "a full-on comedy movie".

== Music ==
No.	Title	Singer(s)	Length
1.	"Billo Hai"	Sahara, Manj Musik, Nindy Kaur	03:37
2.	"Imagine"	Mika Singh, Keka Ghoshal	03:58
3.	"Imagine" (Reprise)	Mika Singh, Keka Ghoshal	03:46
4.	"Parchi" (Title Track)	Ahmed Ali, Aash Chugtai	03:16
Total length:			13:57
