= Nadia Afgan =

Pakistani actress and comedian

- نادیہ افگن
- Born: Nadia Afgan; 7 September 1970 (age 55); Karachi, Pakistan
- Occupations: Actress; Director; Producer; Host
- Years active: 1990 – present
- Movement: Clean Water Access for Everyone

Nadia Afgan is a Pakistani actress who appears in Urdu films and television. She is known for her work in theatre and television. Her numerous works on television include a series of plays in both Urdu and Punjabi. She rose to prominence when she appeared in the hit TV serial Family Front in 1997. Further success came in 2000 with PTV Home's mostmemorable sitcom, Shashlik, which was later re-aired on Geo TV in 2011. Afghan garnered wider appreciation for her comic role in Hum TV's blockbuster comedy drama Suno Chanda (2018), and for its sequel, Suno Chanda 2, as Shahana Batool the following year.

== Early life ==
Nadia Afghan was born in Karachi and is the first-born among four siblings. Her parents are Naila Afghan and Tanvir Afghan, a retired Group Captain from the Pakistan Air Force. Due to her father's military postings, Nadia lived in various cities throughout her childhood. Inspired by her father's career, she aspired to become a fighter pilot herself but was unable to pursue this dream due to gender restrictions at the time.

== Career ==
Afgan started her career as an actress at PTV Lahore Center. She hosted talk shows and nighttime transmissions of PTV for early few years. In late 1990s and early 2000s, her comic roles in PTV's sitcoms such as Family Front, 1 2 3, and Hubahu earned her prominence but she gained recognition with her portrayal of Mishi in Sarmad Khoosat's directorial Shashlik. In early 2010s, besides her portrayals of comic roles, she played dramatic to tragic roles in Bilqees Kaur, Shehr-e-Zaat, Dil Muhallay Ki Haveli and Sannata. In 2016, she directed A&B Entertainment's Shaam Dhaley, and played a supporting role in it as well. In 2017, Afgan received her first ever award nomination–Hum Award for Best Supporting Actress for portraying an orphan nurse in Noorul Huda Shah's written and Saife Hassan's directorial Sammi. In 2018, her career saw a resurgence when besides popularity she gained widespread acclaim and various accolades for her portrayal of Shahana Batool, a typical Punjabi mother in Saima Akram Chaudhry's written Ramadan special Suno Chanda. The same year, her directorial venture Parlour Wali Larki debuted on Bol TV which revolves around two small town girls and their dreams and aspirations. In 2018, she respired her role of Shahana Batool in the sequel of Suno Chanda. In 2021, she received little praise for her role of a dutiful police officer in Shahzad Kashmiri's Parizaad. In 2022, she was praised for portraying the powerful head of a saraiki clan in Abullah Badini's Dushman. Following the success of Suno Chanda, she appeared in another Saima Akram Chaudhry's written, Kala Doriya in the same year, where she portrayed Tanno, a character similar to Shahana Batool. In 2023, Afgan portrayed Shamim, a selfless lover in Kashif Nisar's directed Kabuli Pulao.

In 2025, Afgan portrayed the gullible housewife from a small neighborhood in drama Sharpasand.

== Personal life ==
She is married to Jodi Pai, and the couple has been open about their decision not to have children. Nadia frequently shares her love for her pets, highlighting the joy and companionship they bring to her life.

== Filmography ==
=== Film ===
Year	Title	Role	Notes
2015	Manto	Saugandhi	
2019	Darling	Nagina	Short film
2019	Zindagi Tamasha	TV show Host	Cameo

=== Television ===
Year	Title	Role	Network	Notes	
1992	Maya	Shamim	PTV		
1993	Nazli	Rabia	PTV		
1994	1 2 3	Sharmim	PTV		
1995	Home Sweet Home	Firdaus	PTV		
1996	Teesra Aadmi	Nadia	PTV		
1997	Family Front	Bushra	PTV		
2000	Hubahu	Sonia	PTV		
2001	Shashlik	Mishal (Mishi)	PTV		
2004	Qurban Tere Ishq Pe	Zebunnisa	PTV		
2006	Mr and Misses	Shaista	PTV		
2010	Jinhein Raste Main Khaber Hui	Bilqees	PTV		
2010	Ye Jugnu Hamaray	Shazia	PTV		
2011	Karakti Bijliyan	Samina			
2011	Shashlik Xtra Hot	Mishi			
2012	Mere Huzoor	Saleha			
2012	Chalo Phir Se Jee Kay Dekhein	Shazia			
2012	Afsar Bekar e Khaas	Saima			
2012	Black & White	Noor			
2012	Wilyti Desi	Ayesha			
2012	Larka Karachi Ka Kuri Lahore di	Anjuman			
2012	Raju Rocket	Sameen			
2012	Bilqees Kaur	Mumtaz			
2012	Shehr-e-Zaat	Tabinda	Hum TV		
2013	Sannata	Husna			
2013	Dil Mohallay Ki Haveli	Safiya			
2013	Zindagi Teray Bina	Safiya			
2014	Ladoon Mein Pali	Samreen			
2015	Surkh Jorra	Sabiha			
2016	Shaam Dhaley	Wajeeha		Director also	
2016	Baaghi	Esma			
2016	Faltu Larki	Lubna			
2016	Kitni Girhain Baqi Hain	Amina/Kausar	Hum TV	Episode 9 and 17	
2017	Sammi	Naheed	Hum TV		Nominated — Hum Award for Best Supporting Actress
2017	Dil-e-Nadaan	Hina	Geo Entertainment		
2018	Zamani Manzil Kay Maskharay	Mehrunnisa	Geo Entertainment		
2018	Suno Chanda	Shahana Jamshed Ali aka Shanoo	Hum TV	Hum Award for Best Supporting Actress; Nominated — Hum Award for Most Impactful Character	
2018	Dukh Kam Na Hoge	Saima			
2018	Parlour Wali Larki	Rahat		Director also	
2019	Hoor Pari	Hajra			
2019	Suno Chanda 2	Shahana Jamshed Ali aka Shanoo	Hum TV		
2019	Bhool	Shabana	ARY Digital		
2020	Tum Se Kehna Tha	Saba Chaudhary			
2021	Dil Na Umeed To Nahi	Batool a.k.a. Batoolan	PTV		
2021	Terha Aangan	Shakila			
2021	Parizaad	DSP Badar Munir	Hum TV		
2022	Ibn-e-Hawwa	Shabratan	Hum TV		
2022	Sang-e-Mah	Sheherzaad's boss	Hum TV		
2022-2023	Dushman	Malkani	PTV		
2022-2023	Kala Doriya	Tehniyat Shuja Ahmed A.K.A Tanno	Hum TV		
2023	Kabuli Pulao	Shamim	Green Entertainment		
2023	Khel	Rafiya			
2023	Honey Moon	Shabnam			
2023	Tere Ishq Ke Naam	Ronaq Jehan			
2024	Radd	Shehla Zamin Shah	ARY Digital		
2024	Jafaa	Sadia	Hum TV		
2024	Pas-e-Dewar	Najm-Ul-Nisa	Green Entertainment		
2024	Tan Man Neel o Neel	Mehnaz	Hum TV		
2025	Dastakhat	Kulsoom	Hum TV		
2025	Sher	Saiqa	ARY Digital		
2025	Jinn Ki Shadi Unki Shadi	Farida	Hum TV		
2025	SharPasand	Rubina "Ruby"	ARY Digital		
2026	Aik Aur Pakeeza	Aliya	Geo Entertainment		

=== Telefilm ===
Year	Title	Role	Network	Notes
2010	Ronak Jehan Ka Nafsiyati Gharana	Gul-e-Banfashan		
2010	Pichal Pairiyaan	Imrana Shaukat		
2013	Behadd	Shafaq		
2023	Mera Dil Meri Marzi	Shehnaz Bano		
2025	Miss B.A Pass	Ramsha's mother		

=== Web series ===
Year	Title	Role	Network	Notes
2020	Churails	Aasia	ZEE5	Episode 3
2023	Khoj	Nargis	OTT	

== Accolades ==
Year	Awards	Category	Work	Result	Ref(s).
2018	Hum Awards	Best Supporting Actress	Sammi	Nominated	
2019	Hum Awards	Best Supporting Actress	Suno Chanda	Won	
2019	Hum Awards	Most Impactful Character	Suno Chanda	Nominated	
2020	Pakistan International Screen Awards	Best Television Actress in Comedy role	Suno Chanda	Won	

== Philanthropy ==
Nadia has recently become active in the charitable sector, with a particular focus on water-related relief efforts. She launched a fundraising campaign with Alkhidmat Foundation Pakistan aimed at improving access to clean drinking water in Pakistan. Through her initiative, she successfully raised over PKR 1 million, which has been allocated to sponsor the installation of a water filtration plant in the region.
