= Mizna Waqas =

Pakistani actress

- میزنا وقاص
- Born: Karachi, Pakistan
- Education: University of Karachi
- Occupations: Actress; Model; Host
- Years active: 2013–present
- Spouse: Waqas Ahmed Rajput
- Children: 1

Mizna Waqas, also known as Mizna, is a Pakistani television and theatre actress known for her supporting roles in several acclaimed drama series. She has played the role of Billo in Hum TV's popular series Suno Chanda and its sequel Suno Chanda 2 and the role of Naveeda in Bakhtawar.

== Filmography ==
Key
†	Denotes Series that have not yet been released
†	Denotes drama that are currently on air

=== Stage ===
Production	Year	Theater	Role	Notes
Khel Khel Mein	2016	NAPA, Karachi	Samina	Main Lead

=== Television ===
Year	Title	Role	Network	Ref(s) / Notes
2013	Mann Ke Moti	Maham	Geo Entertainment	
2014	Mere Meherbaan	Tabinda	Hum TV	
2014	Chingari	Rubab	Express Entertainment	
2014	Digest Writer	Shazia	Hum TV	
2014	Ishq Mein Aisa Bhi Haal Hona Hai	Farah	Express Entertainment	
2015	Mera Naam Yousuf Hai	Hajira Noor Mohammed	A-Plus TV	
2015	Ishq-e-Benaam	Arfa	Hum TV	
2016	Deewana	Geti	Hum TV	
2016	Bechari Mehrunnisa	Sarah	Geo Entertainment	
2016	Haasil	Momina	Geo Entertainment	
2016	Natak	Zarnab	Hum TV	
2017	Nazr-e-Bad	Umera	Hum TV	
2017	Ghar Titli Ka Par	Fakhira	Geo Entertainment	
2017	Manto	Minal	Geo Entertainment	
2018	Aik Thi Rania	Salma	Geo Entertainment	
2018	Suno Chanda	Arbella (Billo)	Hum TV	
2018	Tabeer	Muskaan	Hum TV	
2018	Saaya	Raheela	Geo Entertainment	
2018	Maryam Periera	Tabassum	TV One	
2018	Peek-A-Boo Shahwaiz	Beena	Play Entertainment	
2018	Saaya Season 1	Raheela	Geo Entertainment	
2018	Lamhay	Qaisera	Hum TV	
2019	Dil Kiya Karay	Zunaira	Geo Entertainment	
2019	Saibaan	Guest	Geo Entertainment	
2019	Suno Chanda 2	Arbella (Billo)	Hum TV	
2019	Makafaat	Farah		Episode 14
2019	Dolly Darling	Rabiya		
2019	Darr Khuda Say	Maham		
2020	Munafiq	Ramsha, Hamza's cousin.		
2020	Makafaat (season 2)	Recurring		Episode "Shak"
2020	Dikhawa	Faiza		Episode "Khushi Ke Rang"
2020	Mohabbat Tujhe Alvida	Noori		
2021	Qayamat	Saira	Geo Entertainment	
2021	Bechari Qudsia	Kishwar	Geo Entertainment	
2021	Oye Motti	Mrs. Zubair	Express Entertainment	
2021	Fitoor	Afia	Geo Entertainment	
2022	Parizaad	Hamida	Hum TV	
2022	Dour	Geeti	Geo Entertainment	
2022	Ishq Nahin Aasan	Gauriya	Aan TV	
2022	Siyani	Rakhshanda	Geo Entertainment	
2022	Saaya Season 2	Raheela	Geo Entertainment	
2022	Bakhtawar	Naveeda	Hum TV	
2022	Inteqam	Neelo	Geo Entertainment	
2023	Ab Meri Bari	Saba	Aan TV	
2023	Ziddi	Romaisa	Aan TV	
2023	Bojh	Naila	Geo Entertainment	
2023	Baby Baji	Rakhshanda	ARY Digital	
2023	Hoor Pari Noor	Bano	Express Entertainment	
2023	Jindo	Rukhna	Green Entertainment	
2023	Qabeel	Mumtaz Begum	Aur Life	
2023	Wonderland	Mizna	Green Entertainment	
2023	Mein Kahani Hun	Mrs. Shakir	Express Entertainment	
2023	Luka Chuppi	Bina	Play Entertainment	
2023	Muhabbat Ki Akhri Kahani	Zulekha	Express Entertainment	
2023	Nijaat	Fauzia	Hum TV	
2023	Namak Haram	Mureed's mother	Hum TV	
2023	Mannat Murad	Fazeelat	Geo Entertainment	
2023	Doosra Darwaza	Shehzadi	Mun TV	
2023	Khumar	Husna	Geo Entertainment	
2023	Mera Sardar	Sehrish	Mun TV	
2024	Lawaris	Naghma	Aur Life	
2024	Shiddat	Fakhra	Geo Entertainment	
2024	Makafaat Season 6	Noreen	Geo Entertainment	
2024	Nasihat	Shafiq's mother	Green Entertainment	
2024	Dua Aur Azan	Saima	Green Entertainment	
2024	Chaal	Sabeen	Geo Entertainment	
2024	Baby Baji Ki Bahuwain	Rakshi	ARY Digital	
2024	Teray Janay Kay Baad	Rushna	ARY Digital	
2024	Kaash Main Shakeela Hoti	Akila	Set Entertainment	
2024	Freaky Family	Mizna	Set Entertainment	
2024	Iqtidar	Parveen	Green Entertainment	
2025	Guddi	Ishrat	Geo Entertainment	
2025	Ishq Di Chashni	Nayyar	Green Entertainment	
2025	Case No. 9	Shazia	Geo Entertainment	

=== Telefilm ===
Year	Title	Role	Notes
2020	Dil Tera Hogaya	Chanada	
2020	Tuition Wali Tabbassum	Shagufta	
2021	Filmy Siyappa	Mina	

=== Film ===
Year	Title	Role	Notes
2015	Manto	Minal	
2023	Mardangi	Shagufta	
2023	Noor	Jabeen	

=== Other appearances ===
Year	Title	Role	Notes
2021	Naina Ki Sharafat	Herself	
