= Suno Chanda 2 =

Pakistani television drama series

- Season 2
- Starring: Farhan Saeed; Iqra Aziz; Raza Talish; Sabeena Farooq; Ali Safina; Mizna Waqas; Mashal Khan; (For entire cast see below)
- No. of episodes: 30 (Episodes)

Release
- Original network: Hum TV
- Original release: 7 May – 5 June 2019

Suno Chanda 2 is a 2019 Pakistani romantic comedy television series produced by Momina Duraid under their production banner MD Productions. It is a sequel to the 2018 series Suno Chanda. It is directed by Ahson Talish and written by Saima Akram Chaudhry. The first episode of the series was aired on 7 May 2019. In this sequel, Farhan Saeed and Iqra Aziz reprise their roles as Arsal and Ajiya respectively. It also focuses on story of Mithu and Maina played by Raza Talish (the director's real-life son) and Sabeena Farooq respectively. The serial became a sleeper hit in Pakistan, India and the United Kingdom.

== Premise ==
This season continues from where the first season ended. The series explores the story of Jiya and Arsal after their marriage and also focuses on the marriage ceremonies of Sherry with Kinza and Billo with Joji/Jawaad. They had realised their love for each other during the last season. It also has new characters Nagina Chachi who is Jawaad's mother and Shahana's aunt who has come for her son's wedding but she gets bumped into Shah Jahan/Agha Jaan and then they both have a liking for each other and start getting close to each other during the family drama and wedding functions. Mithu, who is the son of Shahana's first cousin Pari and Jalal's niece Maina, both start liking each other and after a little family drama tied the knot, too.

== Cast and characters ==
- Iqra Aziz as Ajiya "Jiya" Arsalan Ali (nee Nazakat Ali) - Daughter of Nazakat and Naeema; Daniyal's sister; Arsal's wife.
- Farhan Saeed as Arsalan "Arsal" Jamshed Ali - Son of Jamshed and Shahana; Jiya's husband.
- Raza Talish as Subugtageen aka Mithoo - Arsal's maternal second cousin; Pari's son; Shahana & Joji's cousin nephew; Maina's love interest turned husband.
- Sabeena Farooq as Romaina Khan aka Maina - Kinza's paternal cousin; Jalal's niece; Zarmeen Gul's daughter; Mithoo's love interest turned wife.
- Nabeel Zuberi as Shehryar Munawar Ali aka Sherry - Agha Jan's grandson; Munawar's son; Jiya, Daniyal and Arsal's second cousin; Kinza's husband.
- Mashal Khan as Kinza Sheheryar Ali (nee Jalal Khan)- Jalal and Masooma's daughter; Jiya, Daniyal and Arsal and Maina's cousin; Sherry's wife.
- Samina Ahmed as Mumtaz Begam aka Bi Jaan - Jamshed, Nazakat and Masooma's mother; Jiya, Daniyal, Kinza and Arsal's grandmother.
- Syed Mohammad Ahmed as Shah Jahan Ali aka Agha Jee - Munawar's father; Shehryar's grandfather.
- Fareeha Jabeen as Nagina Chaudhary - Joji's mother; Pari and Shahana's paternal aunt (chachi).
- Mizna Waqas as Arbela Jawad Chaudhary (nee Shehzadi) aka Billo - Jamshed's ex fiancée; Joji's wife.
- Ali Safina as Chaudhary Jawad aka Joji - Pari and Shahana's paternal cousin and Shahana’s ex fiance; Billo's husband; Nagina's son.
- Farhan Ali Agha as Jamshed Ali - Shahana's husband; Bi Jaan's son; Masooma and Nazakat's brother; Arsal's father.
- Nadia Afgan as Shahana Jamshed Ali (nee Batool) aka Shanno/Channo - Jamshed's wife; Arsal's mother.
- Sohail Sameer as Nazakat Ali - Naeema's husband; Bi Jaan's son; Masooma and Jamshed's brother; Jiya and Daniyal's father.
- Farah Shah as Naeema Nazakat Ali (nee Bibi) - Nazakat's wife; Jiya and Daniyal's mother.
- Adnan Shah Tipu as Jalal Khan - Masooma's husband; Jiya, Daniyal and Arsal's uncle; Kinza's father.
- Tara Mahmood as Masooma Jalal Khan (nee Ali) - Jalal's wife; Bi Jaan's daughter; Jamshed and Nazakat's sister; Kinza's mother; Arsal, Daniyal and Jiya's aunt.
- Arjumand Rahim as Parveen Mughal aka Pari/Peeno - Joji and Shahana's paternal cousin; Nazakat's old flame; Mithoo's mother.
- Sami Khan as Daniyal Nazakat Ali aka DJ - Nazakat and Naeema's son; Jiya's younger brother.
- Anumta Qureshi as Human Salahuddin - Jiya's bestfriend.
- Beena Chaudhary as Zarmeen Gul Khan - Maina's mother; Jalal's sister.
- Hamza Khan as Yasir - Arsal's friend.
- Raja Haider as Dariya Khan aka Daaji - Jalal and Zarmeen Gul's father; Maina and Kinza's grandfather.

== Production ==
In 2018, it was reported that Suno Chanda will have a sequel. Iqra Aziz confirmed being part of the Season. On 2 October 2018, it was reported that Farhan Saeed had signed up for the project opposite Aziz. On 10 October, it was reported that Nabeel Zuberi had also signed up.

Like previous season, this season also introduces some debutants including Raza Abbas Talish, son of director Ahson Talish. The first teaser was released on 22 April 2019. It aired in May 2019 during Ramadan. The first episode of the mini series was aired on 7 May 2019.

== Episodes ==
No.	Title	Directed by	Written by	Original release date
1	"Suno Chanda Season 2 Episode #01"	Aehsun Talish	Saima Akram Chudhery	May 7, 2019
The first episode picks up from where the first season ended and the fight between Arsal and Jiya continues, this time as husband and wife. The issues are Jiya did not get her gift of munh dekhai from Arsal and the loud snoring of Arsal. Arsal tries to establish his supremacy as he is 'son-in-law' of the house. Jiya dislikes his change of attitude. DJ is as usual spreading news of fights. Love continues to flourish between Joji and Billo. New characters appear on the scene from Gujrat as Parveen Mughal (Arjumand Rahim) (Pari), Shahana's cousin and Meetho (Raza Talish) as her son on invitation from Shanno. Nazakat Ali, Jiya's father has previous history with Pari of exchanging of rukka (love messages on chits), which was not liked by Bi Jaan. Shanno continues to entertain with her situational quote of Punjabi proverbs. Episodic reference:
2	"Suno Chanda Season 2 Episode #02"	Aehsun Talish	Saima Akram Chudhery	May 8, 2019
Jiya and Arsal are still fighting and reconciling like before. Jiya's dream of going to London for higher studies is cause of rift between the couple. Kinza and Sherry are enjoying courtship. The arrival of Pari caused commotion in the house. Naeema assures Arsal that she will fix her daughter by the time of walima, but when Arsal leaves, she shows her helplessness to Bi Jaan. Bi Jaan asks Shanno to call Joji's mother to fix his marriage with Billo. Pari introduces her obedient son, Meetho, to the family. Pari utters that she presumed Bi Jaan to be dead, which Bi Jaan overhears. Then she asks Agha Jaan if he is married to Bi Jaan as they were standing too close. Bi Jaan threatens to leave the house if Pari doesn't go back. Shanno requests Agha Jaan and later Arsal and Jiya to butter up Bi Jaan in favour of Pari. Episode reference:
3	"Suno Chanda Season 2 Episode #03"	Aehsun Talish	Saima Akram Chaudhery	May 9, 2019
Arsal and Jiya comes to cool down Bi Jaan. She declares that she will not attend walima if Pari stays. Agha Jaan informs that nikah of Sherry and Kinja will be solemnized at walima. Pari asks Meetho to prepare hookah for her by firing up shisha. DJ fools Meetho and makes him fire up shisha in Jalal's room. One minute Arsal and Jiya are making the honeymoon programme, the next minute she is fighting for inviting his friend Yasir. Shanno asks Najakat to placate Bi Jaan and allow Pari to stay. Pari thrashes Meetho for setting fire in Jalal's room. Seeing all this Bi Jaan softens and allows them to stay. DJ plays another prank by making Meetho wear his ID around his neck. Sherry-Kinja and Jijo-Billo go shopping. Arsal reconciles with Jiya and plans to take her to lunch. Shanno stops them as it is against tradition to go out. They plan to go stealthily. Jalal and Meetho tells-on DJ to Bi Jaan. Episode reference:
4	"Suno Chanda Season 2 Episode #04"	Aehsun Talish	Saima Akram Chaudhery	May 10, 2019
Bi Jaan punishes DJ for playing pranks on Mithoo. Shanno calls aunt Nagina to come fast. Bi Jaan stops Arsal and Jiya for going to lunch as traditionally it is bad and Jiya is to go on maklava. Pari brings sweet rice for Bi Jaan as peace offering. Mithoo requests his mother to arrange kite flying festival on the terrace. The family gathers for kite fighting. They create festival atmosphere and enjoy. They fire shots in air from a toy pistol. Police arrive and want to arrest Arsal for shooting. But the family convinces them to join their merry-making as it is a house of marriage and walima is on Sunday. In all the commotion Arsal and Jiya slip out for lunch. In house Bi Jaan accuses Pari of spoiling atmosphere of house as 'a single fish pollutes the whole pond'. Pari wants to leave house. Arsal and Jiya enjoy lunch but when the check comes, he finds that he forgot his wallet at home. He calls Mithoo to bring cash but he loses his way and is lost. Episode reference:
5	"Suno Chanda Season 2 Episode #05"	Aehsun Talish	Saima Akram Chaudhery	May 11, 2019
Meetho charges his phone by turning his mobike battery into a charger. Pari searches for Meetho in the house. He reaches the restaurant but lacks sufficient money. Sherry calls and Arsal asks him to come with money. They ask Mithoo to keep everything under wraps. But, he tells on them. Shanno takes their class. The issue of going abroad for higher studies again causes rift between the couple. At midnight Meetho feels hungry so Pari goes to the kitchen where Joji and Billo are discussing their marriage plans. The power goes off and Pari mistakes Jijo for a thief and thrashes him. The family gathers to discuss the incident. Arsal tells Jiya that she will have to break all relations to go abroad. Nagina, Joji's mother, (Fareeha Jabeen) arrives and is welcomed by Agha Jaan. DJ makes a video of Agha Jaan hitting on Nagina, and shows it to Bi Jaan. Nagina mistakes Kinja to be her future daughter-in-law, this embarrasses Billo. The episode ends with Arsal and Jiya arguing on Jiya's plans of going abroad. Episode reference:
6	"Suno Chanda Season 2 Episode #06"	Aehsun Talish	Saima Akram Chaudhery	May 12, 2019
Jiya declares that unless Arsal agrees to her going abroad she will not go to walima. The fight continues. Shanno informs Pari about arrival of Nagina, they make fun of her, recalling old memories. Kinza and Billo are upset over Nagina's remarks. Sherry and Joji try to mollify them with sweet-talk. Bi Jaan teases Agha Jaan over Nagina. Jiya asks Sherry and Kinza to mediate between her and Arsal, but Arsal doesn't like it. Jalal continues his flirting with Pari. Nagina overhears Billo telling Joji that she will marry him only if his mother agrees. Nagina becomes emotional and agrees to marriage. Shanno asks Arsal to take Jiya to parlour. Bi Jaan, Agha Jaan and Nagina decide to hold nikah of Joji and Billo at walima celebrations. Arsal takes Jiya's jewellery to parlour. Jiya refuses to go to walima with Arsal and asks Shanno to pick her up. Pari instructs Mithoo to start love affair with the girl she selects at walima. And, the fighting is still on outside and inside parlour with Shanoo trying to resolve standoff. Episode reference:
7	"Suno Chanda Season 2 Episode #07"	Aehsun Talish	Saima Akram Chaudhery	May 13, 2019
Arsal feels sorry, so Jiya goes to walima with her in-laws. Bi Jaan and Agha Jaan welcome guests in marriage hall. The couples make a grand entry cheered by all. Pari advises Mithoo to start his love story with Huma. Jiya announces good news of receipt of confirmation mail from UK university, which is taken lightly by all. Sherry-Kinja and Joji-Billo are bound in nikah. The couples become husband and wife with blessings of all. Everyone is having gala time, bantering and teasing but on dais Arsal and Jiya are having lover's tiff. A dejected Jiya slips out of marriage hall with Mithoo and DJ. The parents of the couple discuss the reason of their tiff, with Arsal. The episode ends with sad Jiya and Arsal sitting in the lawn. Episode reference:
8	"Suno Chanda Season 2 Episode #08"	Aehsun Talish	Saima Akram Chaudhery	May 14, 2019
Arsal becoming emotional tells Jiya that he can't live without her. Jiya calls Huma to come for emotional support. Mithoo starts his quest for love by trying to get her phone number, which she refuses. Nazakat requests Pari not to tell Naema about their past. Arsal gives Huma's phone number to Mithoo. And, he texts her a love message. Masooma and Kinza start making preparations for rukhsati. Jalal's niece keep calling on phone but they don't answer her call. On one side Arsal convinces his in-laws to stop Jiya going abroad and on the other side Jiya playing feminine card convinces her in-laws to send her abroad to study. DJ tells on Mithoo to Agha Jaan about him texting to Huma. Billo orders her wedding dress on internet. Living room of the house is livid with Pari, Jalal, Nagina and Joji fighting and the episode ends with the entry of Bi Jaan in the room. Episode reference:
9	"Suno Chanda Season 2 Episode #09"	Aehsun Talish	Saima Akram Chaudhery	May 15, 2019
Episode reference:
10	"Suno Chanda Season 2 Episode #10"	Aehsun Talish	Saima Akram Chaudhery	May 16, 2019
DJ informs Arsal and Jiya that Maina (Jalal's niece) has arrived at Mumtaz House. Jalal has fixed Kinza's engagement with Maina's brother Gul Khan when they were children. Sherry is upset over it and discloses their married status to Maina. Maina creates havoc in the house on knowing of Kinza and Sherry's nikah and warns Jalal that she will tell it to Masooma's in-laws. Dj makes a video of Jalal in which he is begging Maina not to give this news to his family. The video creates funny movements in the house. Jalal attempts to commit suicide by hanging but stopped when Maina promises him that she will keep quiet. Huma expresses her anger and negative feelings about Mithoo's proposal and warns him not to send her love messages. This breakup upsets Mithoo. Pari advises him to hate Huma and start his love story with Maina. Episode reference:
11	"Suno Chanda Season 2 Episode #11"	Aehsun Talish	Saima Akram Chaudhery	May 17, 2019
Episode reference:
12	"Suno Chanda Season 2 Episode #12"	Aehsun Talish	Saima Akram Chaudhery	May 18, 2019
Episode reference:
13	"Suno Chanda Season 2 Episode #13"	Aehsun Talish	Saima Akram Chaudhery	May 19, 2019
Jalal cries on rukhsati of Kinza. On darwaza rukai (block exit) tradition Joji and Sherry give their purses. Sherry gifts a phone to Kinza on munh dekhai. Arsal and Jiya go to collect their visas. On their return the family gathers to find the outcome. To their dismay they find that Jiya gets the visa but Arsal doesn't. Arsal asks Jiya to change her decision, but she refuses. Mithoo keeps eggs in microwave to boil that too in metal container, and blasts it. Arsal sends Jiya out of the room. Jalal makes fun of her and to get even DJ texts an unsavory message from Jalal's phone to Billo. Joji thrashes Jalal for that. Sherry tries to patch things up between Arsal and Jiya. Episode reference:
14	"Suno Chanda Season 2 Episode #14"	Aehsun Talish	Saima Akram Chaudhery	May 20, 2019
Episode reference:
15	"Suno Chanda Season 2 Episode #15"	Aehsun Talish	Saima Akram Chaudhery	May 21, 2019
There is tension between Arsal and Jiya. Nagina and family is given send off. Arsal goes to see Kinza and Sherry off at the airport with Masooma and Jalal. On return from there Jalal is sad and crying but gets scared on receiving call of daa ji. Jiya is having abdominal spasms as her stomach is aching but Arsal refuses to take her to see a doctor. Daa ji learns of Kinza's wedding as Maina posted pictures of wedding on FB. Huma helps Jiya in her packing for her flight the next day and advises her not to go but she is adamant. Arsal listens behind the door. Jiya keeps on vomiting continuously and refuses to eat or drink. Pari declares that she is expectant and congratulates Shahana on good news. Jalal reads in newspaper that daa ji has disinherited him, and at the same time Shahna comes and congratulates but Jalal thinks she is happy on him being disinherited. Jiya is feeling restless and calls Huma to go to see a doctor. Arsal feels elated on the news of Jiya's pregnancy and hums. Episode reference:
16	"Suno Chanda Season 2 Episode #16"	Aehsun Talish	Saima Akram Chaudhery	May 22, 2019
Episode reference:
17	"Suno Chanda Season 2 Episode #17"	Aehsun Talish	Saima Akram Chaudhery	May 23, 2019
Episode reference:
18	"Suno Chanda Season 2 Episode #18"	Aehsun Talish	Saima Akram Chaudhery	May 24, 2019
Episode reference:
19	"Suno Chanda Season 2 Episode #19"	Aehsun Talish	Saima Akram Chaudhery	May 25, 2019
Episode reference:
20	"Suno Chanda Season 2 Episode #20"	Aehsun Talish	Saima Akram Chaudhery	May 26, 2019
Episode reference:
21	"Suno Chanda Season 2 Episode #21"	Aehsun Talish	Saima Akram Chaudhery	May 27, 2019
Episode reference:
22	"Suno Chanda Season 2 Episode #22"	Aehsun Talish	Saima Akram Chaudhery	May 28, 2019
Episode reference:
23	"Suno Chanda Season 2 Episode #23"	Aehsun Talish	Saima Akram Chaudhery	May 29, 2019
Episode reference:
24	"Suno Chanda Season 2 Episode #24"	Aehsun Talish	Saima Akram Chaudhery	May 30, 2019
Episode reference:
25	"Suno Chanda Season 2 Episode #25"	Aehsun Talish	Saima Akram Chaudhery	May 31, 2019
Episode reference:
26	"Suno Chanda Season 2 Episode #26"	Aehsun Talish	Saima Akram Chaudhery	June 1, 2019
Episode reference:
27	"Suno Chanda Season 2 Episode #27"	Aehsun Talish	Saima Akram Chaudhery	June 2, 2019
Episode reference:
28	"Suno Chanda Season 2 Episode #28"	Aehsun Talish	Saima Akram Chaudhery	June 3, 2019
Jiya asks Arsal for breakfast. Shahana enters and tells Jiya, that she will take care of him and she doesn't have to worry. Jiya start crying and Arsal feels concerned. Maina's mother Zarmeen Gul and Jalal's father Daa Ji arrive and he fires shots in air. Jalal stages a fake heart attack and gets himself admitted to a hospital. On seeing Bi Jaan daaji softens and starts hitting on her. Aga Jaan feels jealous. DJ is rusticated from school for copying. Yasir sets up a Yusra, a fake girlfriend of Arsal to rekindle Jiya's feeling for Arsal. They talk about her in front of Jiya and Yasir calls him to chat posing as Yusra now and then. Huma and Jiya discuss about separation for which fifteen days are balance. On knowing about Jalal's heart attack daa ji and Gul go to hospital with Bi Jaan and Aga Jaan. Daa ji brings pistol in hospital too. Jiya enquires about Yusra from Mithoo and he tells her that Yusra is a tall and beautiful girl. Jiya feels frustrated and bad. Episode reference:
29	"Suno Chanda Season 2 Episode #29"	Aehsun Talish	Saima Akram Chaudhery	June 4, 2019
Jalal is still in hospital faking heart attack. Mithu finding burqa clad lady mistakes her to be Zarmeen Gul and starts begging her to accept him as her son-in-law, but she turns out to be Maina. Arsal continues to make Jiya jealous by faking his relationship with Yusra (Yasir posing as woman). Mithu on entering Maina's room finds same coloured burqa wearing lady and thinks her to be Maina, expresses his love, but she turns out to be her mother. She beats him soundly. She asks Maina to pack her bag and go to Peshewar. Agha Jaan orders women of the house to do purdah (cover face) in front of Daa Ji in retaliation of Daa Ji's flirtious attitude with Bi Jaan and Zarmeen wearing burqa in the house. Shanha asks Arsal to watch linemen repairing power lines on house top. Jiya unaware of this goes in lawn, when suddenly live electric wires fall towards her, Arsal jumps on the nick of time to save her and gets shock. He is taken to hospital. All are worried about him as there is no communication. At last Mithoo and then Jamshed call to inform that Arsal is well now. On return from hospital Arsal and Jiya share room as before. On suggestion of Jalal, Pari requests Bi Jaan to put Mithoo's marriage proposal with Maina to daa ji. By accident on picking Yasir's call to Arsal, Jiya discovers the fake Yusra story. Maina tells her family that she doesn't like Nasseb Khan, so daa ji tells Bi Jaan that he will consider the proposal. Jiya realises her mistakes and opens out her heart to Huma. Aghha Jaan aggravated asks Sherry to book his ticket for London. Shanha uses reverse psychology on Jiya to expose her true feelings for Arsal. The episode ends with Jamshed and Nazakat pursuing Agha Jaan to stop him from going to London. Episode reference:
30	"Suno Chanda Season 2 Episode #30"	Aehsun Talish	Saima Akram Chaudhery	June 5, 2019
Discussion is going on between Arsal and Jiya whether Jiya should go to London or not, Jamshed comes in and informs Jiya that her tickets are booked and she has a flight in four days. Mithu is lovelorn as Maina's mother wants Maina to go to Peshawar and marry her cousin Naseeb Khan. Maina earlier told Bi Jaan that she doesn't like Naseeb Khan so on insistence of Pari, Bi Jaan again talks to Daa Ji and Zarmeen Gul requesting them to give Maina's hand to Mithu. Maina on asking whether she likes Naseeb Khan or not, has replied in negative. Daa Ji accepts Mithu's proposal and marriage is fixed to take place in three days. Pari gives Shahana and Arsal this happy news. Mithu and Maina enjoy their pre-wedding moments. Shahana and Jiya have a heart to heart talk and Jiya on advice of Shahana tries to improve relations with Arsal. The wedding of Mithu and Maina is celebrated with great zeal as whole of the family comes including Kinza and Sherry on the happy occasion. At the event, Jiya informs everyone she doesn't want to go to London and that she cannot live without Arsal. Arsal handovers her an envelope in which it is written on a paper 'I love my wife, I can't live without you' which is passed on to each member of the family. Addressing Jiya, Arsal tells that if she can sacrifice her dream and career for him, he can also get a new passport and visa to go with her to London. This fact was known to whole family except Jiya. The serial ends on happy notes with a family photograph and an appeal by DJ to remember Suno Chanda family. Episode reference:

== Reception ==
The initial response to the series was good, it has been termed as a lighthearted sitcom. Maria Kari of the Dawn says, "after a long day of work, school or fasting we want some lighthearted, mindless, comic relief." According to BizAsia, the first episode of the series was watched by 84,600 viewers at 21:15 – peaking at 94,300 viewers. This was followed by another Hum TV serial Bharam with 33,300 viewers and Geo Entertainment's Siraat-e-Mustaqeem with 23,900 viewers.

=== Potential Sequel ===
It has been reported earlier that a sequel Suno Chanda 3, the third installment in the Suno Chanda series, will be made, however in an interview, Nadia Afgan denied and said "The Suno Chanda series will not be back and writer Saima Akram is writing something new for next Ramadan".
