= Shahid Sajjad =

Shahid Sajjad (1936 in Muzaffarnagar, British India – July 28, 2014, in Karachi, Pakistan) was a Pakistani sculptor. His work continues to influence subsequent practitioners of these genres across Pakistan.

== Life ==
Sajjad was born in Muzaffarnagar, Uttar Pradesh, in 1936. Shahid Sajjad was a self-taught sculptor who began his career in advertising in 1955; a path that led him to become art director at an advertising agency in Karachi. Shahid traveled through South-East Asia, the Middle East and Europe on a motorcycle between 1960 and 1963. His first one-man show was held at the Karachi Arts Council in 1964. During a trip to Paris, his encounter with a single wood carving by Gauguin at the Louvre convinced him that this was what he must do. His determination led to his journey to the Rangamati forest in 1965, where he prepared fallen trees for carving, learning the qualities of the wood through trial and error.

== Career ==
He took on a lucrative position in an advertising agency until around his twenties, deciding to travel Asia by motorbike. His journey left him at the Louvre in Paris. There, Sajjad was inspired by a Tahitian wood carving crafted by French artist Paul Gauguin.

In 1965, he returned to the South Asian subcontinent — a remote village called Rangamati in East Pakistan (now Bangladesh), located within the Chittagong Hill Tracts. Sajjad visited Japan just eight years later; there, he learned the lost-wax casting method from sculptor, Akio Kato.

Shahid lived and worked in the tribal area of the Chittagong Hill Tracts now Bangladesh. On his return from the Chittagong hill Tracts, he worked as art director for an advertising agency in Karachi until 1971, following which he turned to designing sets for a National dance ensemble for nearly two years. During the same period, he visited China and Japan, studying Lost Wax Bronze casting technique under Japanese sculptor Akio Kato whom he acknowledges as his only master. Shahid held a solo exhibition of wood and bronze sculptures at the Karachi Arts Council in 1974 and won the first prize in sculpture at the National Exhibition in Islamabad in 1977. A year later, he exhibited his bronze work at Atelier BM, Karachi. Shahid was commissioned by the Pakistan Army to execute a mural in bronze, later titled 'Cavalry through the Ages' that he completed in 1981. He was awarded national prize for sculpture in 1982. In 1980 he was offered the President’s Pride of Performance Award which he politely refused.

In 1987, Shahid showed his 'Deduction' prints at Chawkandi Art, Karachi. The following year, he was invited by Seoul Olympics Organizing Committee to participate in the Olympiad of Art. Shahid's sculpture 'Woman in Agony' remains on permanent display at the Seoul Olympic Sculpture Park, Seoul, South Korea. The sculptor also participated in the Indian Triennial in Delhi, India, in 1991 and SAARC Festival held in the capital city in 1992.

From 1992 to 1994, Shahid worked in Mansehra in North west Frontier Province of Pakistan on a series of woodcarvings that were shown at an exhibition titled 'My Primitives' held at Chawkandi art in 1994 and subsequently at the National college of Arts, Laahore. During this period, Shahid participated in the 6th Asian art Biennial held in Dacca, Bangladesh and the International Cairo Biennial in 1994 in Cairo, Egypt. In the same year, Shahid was also a participant in the IAA-UNESCO Conference at Fukuoka, Japan, as he was a year later in the Istaqlal 11 Festival in Jakarta, Indonesia.

Having executed the Nowshera Bronze mural successfully, Shahid was commissioned to execute a mural in cold cast bronze for the Maritime Museum, Karachi, in 1996, the same year he was conferred a fellowship of the National college of Arts. Shahid is also a founder member of the Indus Valley school of Arts and architecture, Karachi. Around the close of the year, Shahid participated in the UNESCO-sponsored International Sculpture Event organized by ANC-IAA at the Toolangi Forest near Melbourne, Australia. The work completed by participating artists remains on permanent display at the Toolangi forest discovery Center.

Shahid has held A retrospective exhibition at the National College of Arts, Lahore and subsequently at the Indus valley School of Arts and architecture in 2010.

== Exhibitions ==
- A retrospective at IVSAA, 2010
- Solo Show Karachi Arts Council, 1974
