= Shashlik (TV series) =

Pakistani sitcom

- Title screen
- Genre: Comedy
- Written by: Sarmad Khoosat
- Directed by: Jawad Bashir; Sarmad Khoosat
- Starring: Sarmad Khoosat; Nadia Afgan; Mandana Zaidi; Fatima Ahmed Khan; Nasreen Qureshi
- Country of origin: Pakistan
- Original language: Urdu
- No. of episodes: 92

Production
- Producer: Irfan Khoosat

Original release
- Network: PTV
- Release: 2001 – 2002

Shashlik is a Pakistani comedy-drama sitcom which was written by Sarmad Khoosat, and directed by Jawad Bashir and Khoosat. It was aired on Pakistan Television Corporation from 2001 to 2002. The main cast includes Khoosat, Nadia Afgan, Mandana Zaidi and Nasreen Qureshi. It was Khoosat's directorial and acting debut.

== Overview ==
The plot revolves around Cheeku who is not so manly, and his dynamics with her cousins who live in his house, Mishi, Munni, Chunni and his neighbour Kammo. The sitcom also contains several situational songs.

== Cast ==
- Nadia Afgan as Mishi
- Sarmad Khoosat as Cheeku
- Fatima Ahmed Khan as Kammo
- Mandana Zaidi as Munni
- Wajeeha Tahir as Chunni
- Nasreen Qureshi as Phuppo
- Irfan Khoosat
