= Suno Chanda =

2018 Pakistani television series

- Title Card
- Genre: Romance; Comedy; Drama
- Created by: MD Productions
- Written by: Saima Akram Chudhery
- Directed by: Ahson Talish
- Presented by: Hum TV
- Starring: Iqra Aziz; Farhan Saeed; Nabeel Zuberi; Mashal Khan; Samina Ahmad; Nadia Afgan; Farhan Ali Agha; Farah Shah; (For entire cast see below)
- Theme music composer: Naveed Nashad
- Opening theme: "Suno Chanda" by Farhan Saeed
- Ending theme: "Suno Chanda" by Farhan Saeed
- Composer: Naveed Nashad
- Country of origin: Pakistan
- Original language: Urdu
- No. of seasons: 2
- No. of episodes: 60

Production
- Producer: Momina Duraid
- Production locations: Karachi, Sindh
- Camera setup: Multi-camera setup
- Running time: 40 minutes
- Production companies: MD Productions; Hum Network

Original release
- Network: Hum TV; PTV Home
- Release: 17 May 2018 – 5 June 2019

Related
- Suno Chanda 2

Suno Chanda (Urdu: سنوچندا, lit. 'Listen (my dear) Moon') is a 2018 Pakistani Ramadan romantic comedy series developed by Shahzad Javed, directed by Ahson Talish, and written by Saima Akram Chaudhry. The series celebrates Pakistani wedding traditions and narrates the story of a couple who are cousins in Nikaah, living separately as the Rukhsati is yet to happen, and the relationship between their families. It was aired every night during Ramadan 2018 on Hum TV.

It features Iqra Aziz and Farhan Saeed as Jiya and Arsalan, respectively, in the leading roles, while Samina Ahmad, Syed Mohammed Ahmed, Sami Khan, Nadia Afgan, Farah Shah, Sohail Sameer, Farhan Ali Agha, Mizna Waqas, Ali Safina, Tara Mahmood, Adnan Shah Tipu Mashal Khan, and Nabeel Zuberi are in recurring roles. The series is produced by Momina Duraid under their production banner, MD Productions.

The series received five nominations at the 18th Lux Style Awards, including Best TV Play, Best Writer for Choudhary, Best Actress (critics and viewers) for Aziz, and Best Emerging Talent for Zuberi. It won three awards, including Best TV Play and Best Actress (both Critics and Viewers). The series received the highest ratings and positive reviews on its premiere and was the slot leader for the entire time it was on air. Its sequel, Suno Chanda 2, was released on May 7, 2019 and ended on June 5, 2019 after completely airing 30 episodes on Hum TV.

== Series overview ==
Season	No. of episodes	Originally broadcast (Pakistan)	
Season	No. of episodes	First episode	Last episode
1	30	17 May 2018	15 June 2018
2	30	7 May 2019	5 June 2019

== Plot ==
Arsalan Jamshed Ali and Ajiya Nazakat Ali are cousins and live in a joint family. Their family got them married when they were kids due to the last wish of their grandfather, but the rukhsati is yet to happen. Bi Jaan, their grandmother and head of the family, has two sons, Jamshed Ali and Nazakat Ali, and a daughter, Masooma, who is married to Jalal Khan. They live in Karachi. Jamshed Ali is married to Shahana, and Nazakat Ali is married to Naeema. Jiya has a younger brother, Daniyal Nazakat Ali (DJ), who is an aspiring news reporter. Jiya dreams of joining the London School of Economics for higher studies after her BBA.

Arsal and Jiya are childhood companions who play pranks on each other. Bi Jaan decides to get Arsal and Jiya's formal wedding and rukhsati done to honour her husband's last wish. Arsal and Jiya are against the marriage plan and team up with Kinza, Masooma's daughter, to stop the wedding.

Shah Jahan, Bi Jaan's brother-in-law, and his grandson Shehryar, who lives in London, visit Pakistan for Arsal and Jiya's planned wedding after Eid. Sherry is close to his cousins and a co-conspirator in their plots to stop the marriage. Sherry asks Arsal and Jiya to resolve their problem amicably. Sherry also helps Jiya fulfil her dream of joining the London School of Economics, and they plan to study together. Sherry eventually develops feelings for Jiya, which makes Arsal jealous.

Arsal and Jiya create misunderstandings between their parents. Meanwhile, Sherry falls in love with Jiya. Arsal and Jiya's parents want Arsal to divorce Jiya, but Arsal denies it. Jiya's father sends a divorce notice to Arsal, who then confesses his feelings to Jiya.

Jiya initially rejects Arsal but eventually realises her love for him.

Later, the family discovers that Arsal and Jiya have fallen in love. Arsal and Jiya's parents eventually give in to their love, and the wedding preparations begin. Sherry and Kinza also start liking each other.

Jiya and Arsal argue again on their wedding night, but later realise their foolishness and say sorry to each other. They promise not to repeat the same mistakes and to confess their love for each other.

== Cast ==
Name	Role	Notes
Iqra Aziz	Ajiya "Jiya" Nazakat Ali	Mumtaz and Jahangir's granddaughter; Nazakat and Naeema's daughter; Arsal's wife; Daniyal's sister; Shahana and Jamshed's daughter in law; Masooma and Jalal's niece; Kinza's cousin; Sherry's second cousin. She dislikes Arsal and schemes to disrupt their Nikah, but she finally falls in love with Arsal.
Farhan Saeed	Arsalan "Arsal" Jamshed Ali	Mumtaz and Jahangir's grandson; Jamshed and Shahana's son; Jiya's husband; Nazakat and Naeema's son in law; Masooma and Jalal's nephew; Daniyal and Kinza's cousin; Sherry's second cousin. Hates Jiya at the start of their relationship but later falls in love with her.
Samina Ahmad	Mumtaz Begum aka Bi Jaan	Jiya, Arsal, Daniyal and Kinza's grandmother; Jamshed, Nazakat and Masooma's mother; Jahangir's widow; Shahana, Naeema and Jalal's mother in law; Shah Jahan's old flame turned sister in law; Munawar's aunt; Sherry's grandaunt. She is considerate of others and doesn't want to break Jiya and Arsal's wedding. She is very strict and leads and heads her family united at all times like her late husband's wish.
Nabeel Zuberi	Shehryar "Sherry" Munawar Ali	Jiya, Arsal, Daniyal and Kinza's second cousin; Munawar's son; Agha Jee's grandson; Jamshed, Shahana, Nazakat, Naeema, Masooma and Jalal's cousin nephew. He plans to study abroad with Jiya and has a crush on her. He later falls in love with and marries Kinza.
Mashal Khan	Kinza Jalal Khan	Arsal, Jiya and Daniyal's cousin; Sherry's second cousin; Masooma and Jalal's daughter; Bi Jaan and Abba Jaan's granddaughter; Jamshed, Shahana, Nazakat and Naeema's niece. She had a crush on Arsal but later fell for Sherry and married him.
Farhan Ally Agha	Jamshed Ali	Arsal's father; Shahana's husband; Bi Jaan and Abba Jaan's son; Nazakat and Masooma's brother; Kinza and Daniyal's uncle; Jiya's father in law; Munawar's cousin; Sherry's cousin uncle; Agha Jee's nephew. Famous for his extramarital affair with Billo.
Sohail Sameer	Nazakat Ali	Jiya and Daniyal's father; Naeema's husband; Bi Jaaan and Abba Jaan's son; Jamshed and Masooma's brother; Kinza's uncle; Munawar's cousin; Sherry's cousin uncle; Arsal's father in law; Agha Jee's nephew. He is ill. Over dramatically gets worried about his health.
Nadia Afgan	Shahana "Shanno" Jamshed Ali (nee Batool)	Arsal's mother; Jamshed's wife; Bi Jaan and Abba Jaan's daughter in law; Jiya's mother in law; Daniyal and Kinza's aunt; Munawar's cousin; Sherry's cousin aunt; Agha Jee's niece; Joji's cousin and former fiancée. She is gullible.
Farah Shah	Naeema "Nima" Nazakat Ali (nee Bibi)	Jiya and Daniyal's mother; Nazakat's wife; Bi Jaan and Abba Jaan's daughter in law; Arsal's mother in law; Kinza's aunt; Sherry's cousin aunt. Tries to force Jiya to marry her friend's son.
Syed Mohammad Ahmed	Shah Jahan Ali aka Agha Jee	Sherry's grandfather; Munawar's father; Abba Jaan's brother; Bi Jaan's old flame turned brother in law; Shahana's maternal uncle (khalu), Jamshed, Masooma and Nazakat's elder uncle (taya); Jiya, Daniyal, Kinza and Arsal's granduncle.
Tara Mahmood	Masooma Jalal Khan (nee Ali)	Bi Jaan and Abba Jaan's daughter; Jalal's wife; Kinza's mother; Arsal, Jiya and Daniyal's aunt; Munawar's cousin; Sherry's cousin aunt; Agha Jee's niece. She wants Arsal to marry her daughter Kinza. Because of that, she gossips and creates conflict between the family members.
Adnan Shah Tipu	Jalal Ahmad Khan	Masooma's husband; Bi Jaan and Abba Jaan's son in law; Kinza's father; Arsal, Jiya and Daniyal's uncle; Sherry's cousin uncle. Known for constantly flirting with Billo.
Mizna Waqas	Arbela Shehzadi aka Billo	Bi Jaan's niece (Sister's daughter); Jamshed, Masooma and Nazakat's maternal cousin; Naeema's paternal cousin; Arsal, Jiya, Kinza, Sherry and Daniyal's cousin aunt. She was engaged to Jamshed, but later, he married Shahana. Shahana feels jealous and hatred towards her. She later falls for Joji.
Sami Khan	Daniyal Nazakat Ali aka DJ	Bi Jaan and Abba Jaan's grandson; Nazakat and Naeema's son; Jiya's brother; Arsal and Kinza's cousin; Sherry's second cousin; Jamshed, Shahana, Masooma and Jalal's nephew. He keeps making secret videos of gossip in the house and shares them with other house members.
Ali Safina	Jawad "Joji" Chaudhary	Nagina's son; Shahana's paternal cousin and ex fiancé. Came for Arsal and Jiya's wedding. Later he falls in love with and marries Billo/Arbela.
Agha Sajjad	Jahangir Ali aka Abba Jaan (dead)	Jiya, Arsal, Kinza and Daniyal's grandfather; Bi Jaan's husband; Jamshed, Nazakat and Masooma's father; Agha Jee's brother; Munawar's uncle; Sherry's granduncle; Shahana, Naeema and Jalal's father in law. Jiya and Arsal are married due to his last wish. He wanted his family to be united forever and took this promise from his wife Bi Jaan/Mumtaz.
Anumta Qureshi	Huma Salahuddin	Jiya's best friend.

== Soundtrack ==
Suno Chanda

Soundtrack album by Farhan Saeed
- Released: 30 May 2018
- Recorded: 2018
- Genre: Television soundtrack
- Length: (2:06)
- Language: Urdu
- Label: Hum TV
- Producer: MOMINA DURAID

Music video
- "Suno Chanda" OST on YouTube

Music is composed by Naveed Nashad, lyrics were by Ahson Talish.

== Production ==
The idea of the comic Ramadan special play was conceived by Saira Ghulam Nabi, and the writer Saima Akram Chaudhry was tasked to penned the script. MD Productions approved the idea, and Shehzad Javed provided significant input. Chaudhry developed the story and characters, and the production was completed rapidly, with episodes being written, shot, and aired in quick succession. Chaudhry took the idea of writing a story that depicts the entire family from the Baraat Series (2009–12) and Indian Punjabi cinema. The teasers of the series were released in early May 2018 revealing Iqraz Aziz and Farhan Saeed as leads. Zara Noor Abbas was earlier offered the lead female role, who turned down it.

== Release ==
=== Broadcast ===
The series was broadcast on the channel's international versions in the UK, USA, New Zealand, Australia, and Canada. Dubbed versions of the series including the Arabic version, which aired on MBC Bollywood under the title "زفاف بلا زوجين" and the Persian dubbed version which aired on MBC Persia under the title عروسی بی عروسی. It aired in the UK on Zee TV UK also.

It was rebroadcast on national television, PTV Home. It started airing on August 21, 2019, and both seasons were broadcast without a break between them.

=== Digital release ===
Alongside the series release on YouTube, it also released on Starzplay and ZEE5.

== Reception ==
The series broke previous records for Hum TV and is one of the most successful and watched dramas during Ramadan. It is praised for its blend of reality and culture mixed with humour and was applauded with positive reviews. The last episode of the drama aired on the first day of Eid-ul-Fitr. Aziz and Saeed are praised for their on-screen chemistry.Speaking to The Express Tribune, Aziz said that she is overwhelming and did not expect the series to be a massive hit. She further said about the character she played, "Jiya made me feel happy, and I was really intrigued by the fact that these two people, married to each other, know each other inside and out, but still don't want to live their lives together. Then, when I found out about their Tom & Jerry dynamic, and absolutely loved it!"

In a 2025 article published in The News International, the reviewer Sana Hussain found that for its humour, the series stood out to an extent.

== Awards and nominations ==
Year	Award	Category	Recipient(s)	Result	Ref.
2019	Lux Style Awards	Best TV Play	Suno Chanda	Won	
2019	Lux Style Awards	Best Director	Ahsan Talish	Won	
2019	Lux Style Awards	Best Emerging Talent	Nabeel Zuberi	Nominated	
2019	Lux Style Awards	Best Actress Viewers Choice	Iqra Aziz	Won	
2019	Lux Style Awards	Best Actress Critics	Iqra Aziz	Won	
2019	Hum Awards	Best Actress	Iqra Aziz	Won	
2019	Hum Awards	Best Writer	Saima Akram Chaudhary	Won	
2019	Hum Awards	Best Television Play	Suno Chanda	Nominated	
2019	Hum Awards	Best on-screen couple	Iqra Aziz & Farhan Saeed	Won	
2019	Hum Awards	Best Supporting Actor	Adnan Shah Tipu	Won	
2019	Hum Awards	Best Supporting Actress	Nadia Afgan	Won	
2019	Hum Awards	Most Impactful Character	Nadia Afgan	Nominated	
2019	Hum Awards	Best Male Actor	Farhan Saeed	Won	
2019	Hum Awards	Best Child Actor	Sami Khan	Won	
2019	IPPA Awards	Best Television series- Viewer's choice	Suno Chanda	Won	
2019	IPPA Awards	Best Director	Ahson Talish	Won	
2019	IPPA Awards	Best Actor-Jury	Farhan Saeed	Won	
2019	IPPA Awards	Best Actor-Viewer's choice	Farhan Saeed	Nominated	
2019	IPPA Awards	Best Actress-Jury	Iqra Aziz	Won	
2019	IPPA Awards	Best Actress-Viewer's choice	Iqra Aziz	Nominated	
2019	IPPA Awards	Best Supporting Actress	Nadia Afgan	Won	
2019	IPPA Awards	Best On-screen couple	Iqra Aziz & Farhan Saeed	Won	
2019	Pakistan International Screen Awards	Best Actor	Farhan Saeed	Won	
2019	Pakistan International Screen Awards	Best Original Soundtrack	Suno Chanda	Nominated	
2019	Pakistan International Screen Awards	Best Actor in a comic Role	Ali Safina	Won	
2019	Pakistan International Screen Awards	Best Actor in a comic Role	Adnan Shah Tipu	Nominated	
2019	Pakistan International Screen Awards	Best Actress in a comic role	Nadia Afgan	Won	
2019	Pakistan International Screen Awards	Best Actress in a comic role	Farah Shah	Nominated	
2020	Pakistan International Screen Awards	Best Television Actor	Farhan Saeed	Won	
2020	Pakistan International Screen Awards	Best Television Actor in Comedy role	Ali Safina	Nominated	
2020	Pakistan International Screen Awards	Best Television Actor in Comedy role	Adnan Shah Tipu	Nominated	
2020	Pakistan International Screen Awards	Best Television Actress in Comedy role	Nadia Afgan	Won	
2020	Pakistan International Screen Awards	Best Television Actress in Comedy role	Farah Shah	Nominated	
2020	Pakistan International Screen Awards	Best Original Soundtrack	Farhan Saeed, Damia Farooq & Rimsha Khan	Nominated	

== Impact ==
Suno Chanda set the trend of Ramadan special rom-coms for TV channels in Pakistan. Following its success, 30-episode Ramazan specials have become a regular fixture on Pakistani TV channels. The show's popularity led to its sequel as well in the Ramazan of 2019.

=== Sequel ===
The makers announced season 2. Iqra Aziz confirmed being part of the Season. On October 2, 2018, it was reported that Farhan Saeed had signed up for the project opposite Aziz. On October 10, it was reported that Nabeel Zuberi had also signed up. The series episodes aired on the first day of Ramadan, May 7, 2019, and the last episode was aired on June 6, 2019. In October 2019, the third season of Suno Chanda was announced. In an interview with Fuchsia Magazine, Aehsun Talish confirmed that the new season would be coming in Ramadan 2022. However, it was later revealed by writers that there was no season 3 of the show.

== See also ==
- List of programs broadcast by Hum TV
- Kis Din Mera Viyah Howay Ga (Season 04)
