= Adeela Suleman =

Pakistani sculptor and artist

- عدیلا سُلیمان
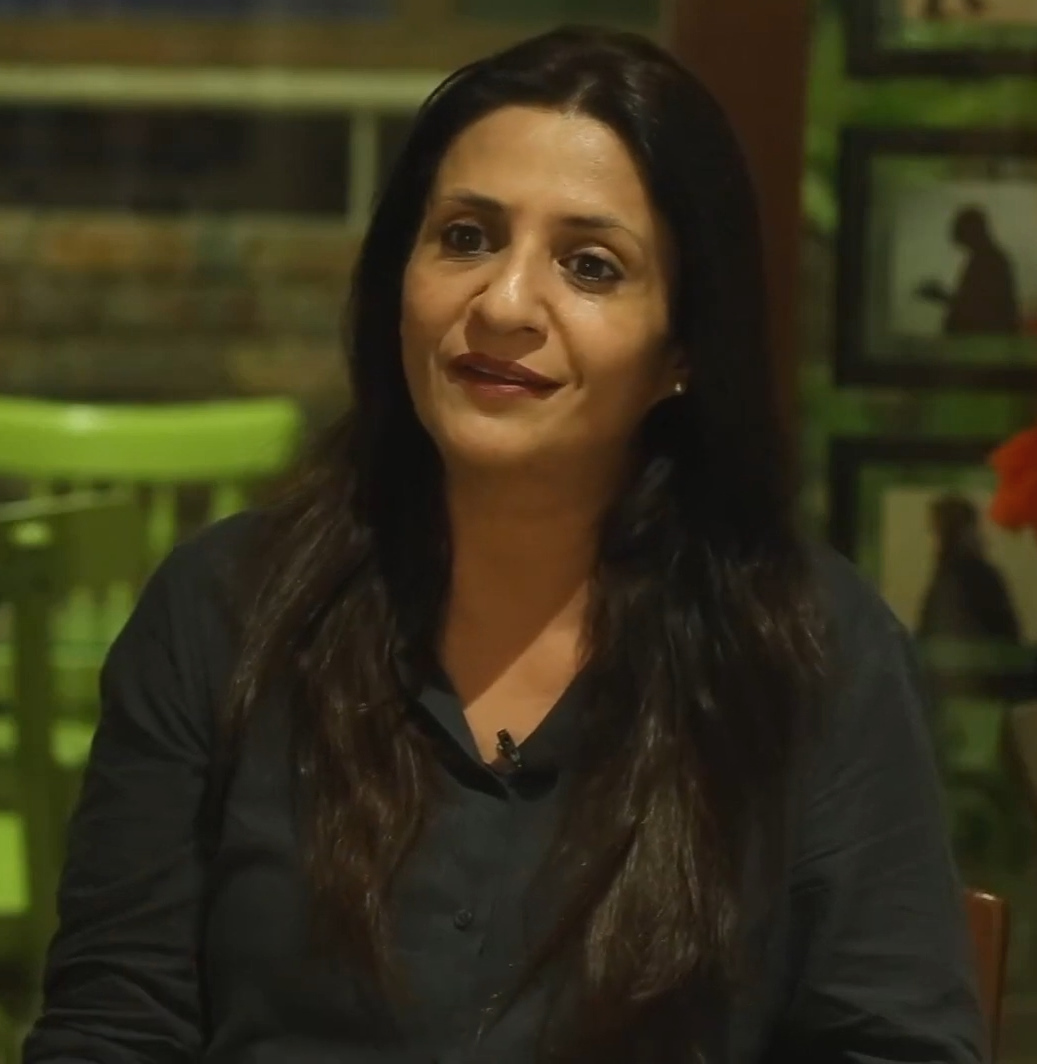
- Suleman in October 2019
- Born: 1970 (age 55–56); Karachi, Pakistan
- Education: University of Karachi (MFA), Indus Valley School of Art and Architecture (BFA)
- Occupations: Sculptor, Artist
- Years active: Since 2002
- Known for: Contemporary sculpture and installation art exploring social themes

Adeela Suleman (born 1970, Karachi, Pakistan) is a contemporary Pakistani sculptor and artist, based in Karachi. She is known for the social and political commentary underlying her sculptures, which are created out of mundane, everyday objects.

Suleman was an associate professor at the Indus Valley School of Art and Architecture and served as head of the Fine Arts Department at the university from 2008 to 2019. She is also the founding member and director of Vasl Artists' Association.

== Early life and education ==
Suleman completed her bachelor's degree from St. Joseph's and then acquired a master's degree in international relations from the University of Karachi in 1995. After this, she switched her focus to art, completing a Bachelor of Fine Arts in sculpture from the Indus Valley School of Art & Architecture in 1999.

== Career ==
Suleman's work takes domestic objects and materials from everyday life and transforms them into sculptures. Her art has consistently reflected an engagement with contemporary socio-political concerns, primarily gender in Pakistani society, an engagement that has continued from her earlier university days.

One of the themes running through her art is the restrictions that women face in the private sphere. She created helmets, body armour and corsets made out of kitchen utensils and other functional tools, to show the entrapment that the private sphere imposes upon women in Pakistani society.

Her more recent work has moved towards flatter silhouettes, creating tableaux on steel sheets, where pastoral scenes are rendered in the filigree tradition of Islamic art on the hard steel surface. These pastoral images are juxtaposed with symbols of destruction like weapons; the contradiction in these images signifies the indifference of society to the violence present within it. Suleman's work displays recurring motifs of organic elements like flowers and birds.

Suleman was the project coordinator of "Reimagining the Walls of Karachi", a scheme, run by I Am Karachi (a charity), that aimed to repaint the walls of the city and cover up the hate graffiti in 1600 different locations.

=== Exhibitions ===
Suleman's work has been exhibited in both national and international exhibitions. Some of her exhibitions include:

==== Solo ====
- Canvas Gallery, Karachi, Pakistan (2015)
- Aicon Gallery, New York, United States (2014)
- Canvas Gallery, Karachi, Pakistan (2012)
- Alberto Peola Gallery, Torino, Italy (2012)
- Aicon Gallery, London, UK (2011)
- Rohtas Gallery, Lahore, Pakistan (2008)

==== Group ====
- Pinakothek der Moderne, Munich, Germany
- Kasteel Van Gaasbeek, Brussels, Belgium
- National Taiwan Museum of Fine Arts, Taichung, Taiwan
- Phantoms of Asia - Asian Art Museum, San Francisco, United States
- Devi Art Foundation, Gurgaon, India
- Asia Society Museum, New York, United States
- Mohatta Palace Museum, Karachi, Pakistan
- Kiran Nader Museum of Art, New Delhi, India
- National Gallery of Indonesia, Jakarta, Indonesia
- La Triennale di Milano Museum, Milan, Italy
- National Gallery of Modern Art, Bombay, India
- Kunsthalle Fridericianum Kassel, Germany
- National Art Gallery, Islamabad, Pakistan
- Fondazione 107, Torino, Italy
- Apexart, New York, United States

She has also participated in the Singapore Biennale (2016), Sea Triennial, Jakarta (2013), Asia Triennial II, Manchester (2011), Fukuoka Asian Art Triennale (2002) and the Karachi Biennale (2017) and (2019).

Reviews and features of work appear in Artforum and the New York Times, among other publications.

==== Karachi Biennale 2019 ====
Suleman's installation "Killing Fields of Karachi", an exhibition on the 444 extra-judicial killings by Rao Anwar, a former Malir SSP (Senior Superintendent), was destroyed by law enforcement agencies. This sparked protest among Pakistani artists, academics and activists. The artist collective Creative Process Projects demanded that the Biennale and its organizers stand in support of Suleman. The call was endorsed by Sheema Kermani, Sharmeen Obaid-Chinoy, Marvi Mazhar and others.

In a statement, organizers of the Karachi Biennale said: "With regards to the exhibition in question, we feel that despite the artist's perspective, it is not compatible with the ethos of KB19 whose theme is 'Ecology and the Environment'."

The statement added that "politicizing the [Biennale] platform will go against our efforts to bring art into the public and drawing artists from the fringe to the mainstream cultural discourse".

=== Vasl Artists' Association ===
Vasl Artists' Association is affiliated with the Triangle Network, UK, an international network of artists and art organizations. The term Vasl, originating from both Urdu and Persian poetry, has an enriched deep association of a physical or transcendent connection between two. Inspired by this philosophy, Vasl Artists' Association functions as a platform for encouraging the freedom to express and nurture creativity.

Established in 2001 and based in Karachi, Pakistan, Vasl is a not-for-profit organization (global network of artists and visual arts organization) that supports professional development and cultural exchange. Since its inception, more than 600 international and local artists have undertaken Vasl residencies, attended various workshops and created projects of significance. Suleman is a founding member of Vasl Artists' Association and the current Director of the company.
