= Mahenur Haider =

Pakistani actress

- Born: Mahenur Haider Khan; 14 September 1995 (age 30); Lahore, Pakistan
- Education: Beaconhouse National University
- Occupations: Actress; Model
- Years active: 2013 – present
- Spouse: Zarrar Mustapha (m. 2018; div. 2020)
- Parents: Zarrar Haider (father); Amina Zarrar (mother)
- Relatives: Gulelala Khan (sister)

Mahenur Haider (born 14 September 1995) is a Pakistani actress and model. She is known for her role in drama Aulaad and in the movies Parchi and Teefa in Trouble. She runs her fashion brand called Zyre.

== Early life ==
Mahenur was born on 14 September 1995 in Lahore, Pakistan. She graduated with a degree in Visual Communication Design from Beaconhouse National University.

== Career ==
She also did theatre at school, she did stage performance in 2011 for Umair Ashfaq's play, The Will at Lahore's famous Alhamra Arts Council, playing the role of a Sikh woman named Aishwariya and after that she did a second play which was a Frankengujjar and was directed by Subhan Ahmad Bhutta. Mahenur first started modeling at age 17.

She first did her fashion shoot for Bareezé. For five years she did modeling for brands such as Khaadi, Nishat Linen, Maria B, Kayseria, Alkaram Studio, Beechtree, Charizma, Chen One, Clive Shoes, Limelight, Rang Ja, Rungrez, Shoe Planet and The Closet. She was also model for skincare brand and Conatural.

Mahenur later decided to do TV commercials and editorials. In 2016 she appeared in Jal’s music video for Layian Layian opposite Goher Mumtaz.

In 2018 she made her debuted in films with Imran Kazmi's Parchi, directed by Azfar Jafri. The film came out to be a blockbuster with Mahenur role of Natasha received positively reviews in newspapers and magazines.

The same year in July she appeared in the film Teefa in Trouble. Her role was Sara. The film was directed by Ahsan Rahim and had an ensemble cast of Ali Zafar, Maya Ali, Jawed Sheikh, Faisal Qureshi and Simi Raheal. Teefa in Trouble became one of the highest grossing films in the country her role was met with positive reviews.

In 2019, she appeared in the Strings music video for Raat Shabnami. The music video along with her performance garnered media attention and applaud.

In 2020 she was given the role of Muskaan in drama Aulaad aired on ARY Digital which she accepted. She also appeared in the music video So Long, Goodbye by Danyal Zafar brother of Ali Zafar. The following year she appeared in film Naseeba with Mohsin Abbas Haider.

== Personal life ==
She was married to businessman Zarrar Mustapha on 4th April 2018. They separated in 2020. She is fluent in four languages including English, Urdu, Pashto and Punjabi and loves Urdu poetry.

== Filmography ==
=== Television ===
| Year | Title | Role | Network |
|---|---|---|---|
| 2020 | Aulaad | Muskaan | ARY Digital |
| 2021 | Jeeto Pakistan League Season 2 | Herself | ARY Digital |
| 2021 | Ishq Hai | Nimra | ARY Digital |
| 2022 | Betiyaan | Ayeza | ARY Digital |
| 2023 | Jhok Sarkar | Lubna | Hum TV |
| 2023 | Grey | Mona Haider | Green Entertainment |
| 2024 | Khaie | Apana Khan | Geo Entertainment |
| 2024 | Aye Ishq e Junoon | Maheen Zulfiqar | ARY Digital |
| 2024 | Diyar-e-Yaar | Rubab | Green Entertainment |

=== Web series ===
| Year | Title | Role | Network |
|---|---|---|---|
| 2023 | Family Bizniss | | Tamasha Channel |

=== Telefilm ===
| Year | Title | Role |
|---|---|---|
| 2023 | Daku Bangaya Gentleman | Dia |
| 2024 | Love Hai Mushkil | Sajal |

=== Film ===
| Year | Title | Role |
|---|---|---|
| 2018 | Parchi | Natasha |
| 2018 | Teefa in Trouble | Sara |
| 2020 | Naseeba | Naeeba |
| 2021 | You… Me …Us | Ayra |

=== Music videos ===
| Year | Band/Singer | Song |
|---|---|---|
| 2016 | Jal | Layian Layian |
| 2019 | Strings | Raat Shabnami |
| 2020 | Danyal Zafar | So Long, Goodbye |
| 2022 | Raafay Israr | Chor Diya |
