= Farah Mahbub (photographer) =

Pakistani photographer (born 1965)

- Born: Farah Mahbub; April 10, 1965
- Known for: Photography

Farah Mahbub (born April 10, 1965) aka Farah Jee is a Pakistani fine art photographer and a photography professor teaching at Indus Valley School of Art and Architecture, Karachi, Pakistan. Mahbub was awarded second prize in the fine art category at Px3 (Prix de la Photographie, Paris).

== Biography ==
Mahbub graduated from PECHS College Karachi with Bachelor of Arts degree in 1987. She has been working as a professional photographer since 1988, doing fine art photography for personal self-expression and freelancing for publications. She has taught photography at Indus Valley School of Art and Architecture since 1997.

== Publications with contributions by Mahbub ==
- Chobi Mela IV. International Festival of Photography, Bangladesh, 2006.
- Blue Print to Cyanotypes: Exploring Historical Alternative Photographic Processes. Stockholm, Sweden, 2006. By Malin Fabbri and Gary Fabbri.
- Px3 Annual Book. 2007.
- Journeys of the Spirit – Pakistan Art in the New Millennium. Salwat Ali. Pakistan, 2008.
- Mazaar, Bazaar, Design and Visual Culture in Pakistan. Edited and designed by Saima Zaidi. 2009.
- K' Architecture. Edited by Arshad Faruqui and Amean J.. Black Olive Publication and the Institute of Architects of Pakistan, 2010.
- Kam Sukhan, 9 Years of Kiran Fine Jewellery. Pakistan: Markings, 2013.

== Exhibitions ==
=== Solo exhibitions ===
- November 2005: Ethereal Ether Echoes, V.M. Art Gallery, Karachi
- March 2012: Baraka Silsila.e.Nisbat, V.M. Art Gallery, Karachi

=== Group exhibitions ===
- February 2002: An Idea of Perfection, (PNCA) Pakistan National Council of the Arts Al-Hamra Gallery, Lahore, Pakistan
- 2006: Artists' Voices: Calligraphy, Amin Gulgee Gallery, Karachi, Pakistan. Co-curated by Sheherbano Hussain and Amin Gulgee.
- 2006: Artists' Voices: Body, Amin Gulgee Gallery, Karachi, Pakistan. Co-curated by Sheherbano Hussain and Amin Gulgee.
- June–July 2007: Px3, Prix de la Photographie, 13 Sévigné Gallery, Paris
- 29–31 May 2009: K'architecture, Karachi Expo Center, Karachi | IVS Gallery Karachi
- 9 December 2009: Images: There and Then, Mohatta Palace Museum, Karachi
- 18–30 April 2011, The Family, VM Art Gallery, Karachi
- 21 May – 8 June 2013: Kam Sukhan, IVS Gallery, Karachi

== Awards ==
- 2007: Second Prize in Fine Art category, Px3, Prix de la Photographie, 13 Sévigné Gallery, Paris, June/July 2007, for "Lifelines & Manuscripts 25."
