= Heer Maan Ja =

2019 Pakistani Urdu-language romantic comedy film

- Theatrical release poster
- Directed by: Azfar Jafri
- Written by: Owais Korai Baloch
- Produced by: Imran Raza Kazmi; Hareem Farooq; Arif Lakhani
- Starring: Ali Rehman Khan; Hareem Farooq
- Cinematography: Rana Kamran
- Edited by: Mitesh Soni
- Music by: Ahmed Ali
- Production companies: IRK Films; Arif Lakhani Films
- Distributed by: Geo Films; Distribution Club
- Release date: 12 August 2019 (Eid al-Adha)
- Running time: 146 minutes
- Country: Pakistan
- Language: Urdu
- Box office: Rs. 12 crore (US$430,000)

Heer Maan Ja is a 2019 Pakistani romantic comedy film, directed by Azfar Jafri. The film is produced by Imran Raza Kazmi under the banner of IRK Films, and distributed by the Distribution Club. The film stars Ali Rehman Khan and Hareem Farooq in the lead roles, alongside Faizan Shaikh, Shamayale Khattak, Sami Khan, and Mojiz Hasan in the supporting roles. The film was released on 12 August 2019, on the occasion of the Eid al-Adha.

== Cast ==
- Ali Rehman Khan as Kabeer Mustafa
- Hareem Farooq as Heer
- Faizan Shaikh as himself
- Abid Ali as Heer's Father
- Sami Khan as Child
- Mojiz Hasan as Jerry (Kabeer's Friend)
- Shamayale Khattak as Ramsey/Ramzan (Jerry's Cousin)
- Shaz Khan as Office Junior Employee
- Sabiha Hashmi as Heer's mother
- Aamina Sheikh as Saba
- Zara Sheikh as Jerry's friend
- Mikaal Zulfiqar as Doctor
- Zayn Khan as Bhai
- Ahmed Ali Akbar as Investigation Officer
- Ali Kazmi as Passport Guy
- Muhammad Usman Malik as Maan
- Alamdar Hussain as Office Colleague
- Anjum Habbibi as Faizan's father
- Samina Nighat as Heer's cousin
- Munazzah Arif as Faizan's mother
- Saleem Mairaj as Chaman Bhai
- Reham Rafiq as background dancer

== Production ==
=== Casting and Announcement ===
Imran Raza Kazmi hinted at the film on 30 December 2017, in an interview with Daily Times, stating that his next movie would be a romantic comedy with shooting starting by June 2018. This was the fourth film released under the banner of IRK Films and the fourth film from IRK Films directed by Azfar Jafri.

In an interview with Papperazi about Heer Maan Ja, CEO & Producer IRK Films, Imran Raza Kazmi said, "Heer Maan Ja" will be a different take on films and humor and people will see Hareem (Farooq) and Ali (Rehman Khan) in a completely different look and avatar compared to Parchi. This will be Hareem Farooq's second movie as a lead cast with Ali Rehman Khan, including Parchi released in 2018. In an interview with Celeb dhaba Hareem Farooq said "Heer Maan Ja is a family entertainment film with a heavy dose of entertainment and families can enjoy the film on a special occasion like Eid ul Adha." Talking to the media, Director Azfar Jafri said Heer Maan Ja will be different than his previous films as it is packed with comedy, action, and entertainment. Ali Rehman Khan said "I really enjoyed working on Heer Maan Ja. I have high expectations with the film and I really hope everyone will like the film."

== Reception ==
=== Critical response ===
Haider Rifaat of The Express Tribune and Naya Daur gave the film a 4/5 rating and stated, "Heer Maan Ja was a crowd-puller. The theme, direction and music of the film were thoroughly entertaining. There were no loose ends and each character got closure, especially Heer. Many stars made brief cameos that positively influenced the story. With emphasis on minute details, the film was shot and acted out smartly." Faisal Ali H of Hip in Pakistan praised the performances of Ali Rehman Khan and Hareem Farooq along with screenplay and direction. He made mention of supporting cast and said, "No review of Heer Maan Ja would be complete without the brilliant supporting performances and cameos." He felt that The film had lighthearted sequences, romance & emotions, which were woven into its chase-driven narrative. Concluding Saleem opined, "The film’s positive issue-based messaging is indicative of socially responsible filmmaking which must be lauded. The film easily has all it takes to keep you entertained for the over two hour of its runtime and will definitely spice up your Eid festivities."

== Soundtrack ==
Heer Maan Ja

Soundtrack album by Vee Music, Manj Musik, Ahmed Ali and Aakash Pervaiz
- Released: 25 July 2019
- Recorded: 2019
- Genre: Feature film soundtrack
- Length: 14:02
- Language: Urdu
- Label: Saga Music

The soundtrack of the film is composed by Vee Music, Manj Musik, Ahmed Ali and Aakash Pervaiz. Lyrics are written by Sunny B, Abdullah Qureshi (Singer), Kashaaf Iqbal, Fatima Najeeb and Herbie Sahara.

Track listing
No.	Title	Lyrics	Music	Singer(s)	Length
1.	"Heer Maan Ja - Title Track"	Sunny B	Vee Music	Herbie Sahara UK	3:30
2.	"Addi Maar"	Herbie Sahara	Manj Musik	Sahara UK, Nindy Kaur	3:50
3.	"Chan Mahi"	Abdullah Qureshi (Singer)	Ahmed Ali, Aakash Pervaiz	Abdullah Qureshi (Singer)	3:30
4.	"Kuch Tou Hua Hai"	Kashaaf Iqbal and Fatima Najeeb	Ahmed Ali, Aakash Pervaiz	Rameez Khalid, Aima Baig	4:12
Total length:					14:02

== See also ==
- List of Pakistani films of 2019
