= Mashal Khan (actress) =

Pakistani actress

- Born: Mashal Tariq Khan; Karachi, Pakistan
- Education: Karachi Grammar School, McGill University
- Occupations: Actress; Model; Host; Finance Coach & Advisor
- Years active: 2018–2025
- Known for: Suno Chanda; Suno Chanda 2

Mashal Khan (Urdu: مشال خان) is a Pakistani former actress turned finance coach and advisor. She gained popularity by playing the role of Kinza Jalal Khan in her debut serial Suno Chanda (2018), which proved to be the breakthrough for her.

== Early life and education ==
Born and raised in Karachi, Khan attended Karachi Grammar School before pursuing a degree in mathematics at McGill University in Canada, where she was also actively involved in theatre during her studies.

== Career ==
=== Acting (2018–2025) ===
In 2019, she appeared in Suno Chanda 2, a sequel to Suno Chanda and reprised her role of Kinza, which was her acting debut and earned her fame. The same year, her other notable roles include that of the antagonist in Mere Humdam and as Sonia in Khaas. She also appeared as host in travel guide show Amazing Nordics at Hum TV.

In August 2025, Khan announced that she would quit the showbiz industry to pursue career in finance.

=== Digital finance advocacy and cryptocurrency (2025–present) ===
Khan has recently gained attention for her active involvement in the finance, especially fintech, as well cryptocurrency spaces. She launched dedicated YouTube and Instagram platforms where she shares educational content aimed at young audiences and newcomers to the crypto market. Through short videos and commentary, Khan explains various aspects of digital assets, blockchain, and market trends in an informal and candid style tailored for the general public.

== Personal life ==
Khan was engaged to actor Ali Ansari since 2017. Later, in 2020, their relationship suddenly ended.

She identifies herself as a vegetarian.

== Filmography ==
=== Television series ===
Year	Title	Role	Network	Notes
2018	Suno Chanda	Kinza Jalal Khan	Hum TV	
2019	Mere Humdam	Paras	Hum TV	Antagonist
2019	Khaas	Sonia	Hum TV	
2019	Suno Chanda 2	Kinza Sheheryar Ali	Hum TV	
2019	Amazing Nordics	Herself	Hum TV	Travel show host
2019	Thora Sa Haq	Hareem	ARY Digital	Antagonist
2020	Dikhawa	Huma	Geo Entertainment	Episode 27
2020	Dulhan	Annie	Hum TV	
2021	Khwaab Nagar Ki Shehzadi	Meera	ARY Digital	
2021	Ajnabi Humsafar	Alizay	Sab TV	
2021	Parizaad	Lubna/Mahpara	Hum TV	
2021	Qissa Meherbano Ka	Fariyaal "Fari" Murad	Hum TV	
2022	Saaya 2	Pinky	Geo Entertainment	
2022	Hasrat	Noor	Hum TV	
2023	Pyari Mona	Zee	Hum TV	
2023	Kacha Dhaga	Maya	Hum TV	
2023	Ab Meri Bari	Soniya	Aan TV	
2023	Mein Kahani Hun	Najma	Express Entertainment	
2023	Ehsaan Faramosh	Nawal	ARY Digital	
2023	College Gate	Zara	Green Entertainment	
2023	Jaisay Aapki Marzi	Natalia	ARY Digital	
2024	Raaz	Annie	Green Entertainment	
2024	Pagal Khana	Tina	Green Entertainment	
2024	Yaar-e-Mann	Sara	Green Entertainment	
2024	Duniyapur	Aiman	Green Entertainment	

=== Telefilm ===
Year	Title	Role
2021	Future Imperfect	Zeest

=== Film ===
Year	Title	Role	Language	Notes
2018	Sisters In Arms	Rashida Kavhar	Urdu	Lead Role - Short film
2020	Bridge	YouTuber	Urdu	Lead Role - SeePrime (Short film) digitally released
2021	Ajnabi	Misha	Urdu	Lead Role - SeePrime (Short film) digitally released
2023	Teri Meri Kahaniyaan	Amna	Urdu	Lead Role

==== Web series ====
Year	Title	Role	Language	Notes
2021	Lifafa Dayan	Alina Ali	Urdu	Released on "Urdu Flix"
