= Abdullah Qureshi (singer) =

Pakistani singer, songwriter, and musician

Abdullah Qureshi عبد اللہ قریشی
- Born: 6 August 1993 (age 33); Islamabad, Pakistan
- Occupations: Singer; Songwriter; Composer
- Instruments: Guitar; Piano; Percussion
- Years active: 2013–present
- Relatives: Hareem Farooq (cousin)

Abdullah Qureshi is a Pakistani singer, songwriter, and music composer. Born in Islamabad, Abdullah gained recognition from his covers on YouTube. Qureshi also featured in popular music TV program Nescafé Basement Season 4, performing an original song "Awaz Do".

== Life and career ==
Abdullah Qureshi was born and raised in Islamabad and got his early education from Bahria College Islamabad. He obtained a Bachelor's degree in Mass Communication from the National University of Sciences and Technology. Qureshi started out playing for underground rock and metal bands in Islamabad and later started his own thing under his own name.

He gained popularity from his covers on YouTube that started getting him concerts across Pakistan. He also appeared in Nescafé Basement Season 4 and performed "Awaz Do" and "Kitni Sadiyan". He released his first song "Tere Liye" in 2013. Qureshi shot to fame with his take on Coke Studio's "Afreen Afreen" and his famous rendition of "Sufi Medley". Since then, Abdullah has released several songs that gained him international recognition. His songs "Kali Santro" and cover of Junaid Jamshed's "Ilaahi Teri Chokhat Par" were also featured in Gulf News. In 2018, Qureshi performed the team anthem for PSL side Islamabad United titled "Kitna Rola Dalay Ga". Following his popularity, Abdullah also headlined Levis Live Round 2. He has been actively performing throughout Pakistan and internationally including in England, Dubai and Thailand.

Coldplay's video of their song "Daddy" had some similarities with Abdullah Qureshi's "Laapata".

On 6 October 2022, Abdullah Qureshi announced on his Facebook page that he was quitting the music industry due to religious reasons.

== Discography ==
=== Singles ===
- "Tere Liye"
- "Pardesi"
- "Intezaar" (feat. Sarmad Abdul Ghafoor)
- "Awaz Do"
- "Daastan"
- "Gaai Aasmaan"
- "Kali Santro"
- "The Whistle Song"
- "Laapata"
- "Chan Mahi" – Heer Maan Ja
- "Dil Mera" - Big Foot
- "Aaja"
- "Baat Adhuri"
- Reflections
- Fasana
- Na Javeen
- Hasda Rehnda
- Kitni Dair
- Daro Na

=== Collaborations ===
- Tere Saath - Eahab Akhtar ft. Abdullah Qureshi
- Suno Ft. Zenab Fatimah Sultan

=== Covers and Renditions ===
- "Sufi Medley"
- "Afreen Afreen" (Cover)
- "Tere Pyar Mein"
- "Husool-e-Aman"
- "Wohi Khuda Hai"
- "Dua (Shanghai)"
- "Ilaahi" (Rendition)
- "Evolution of Love" – Nestle Fruita Vitals
- "Jee Lay Har Pal" – Pepsi
- "Aye Khuda" – Adnan Sami
- "Lips of an Angel"
- "Ansoo"
- "The Scientist"
- "I'm Yours" (Jason Mraz – Cover)
- "Snow Patrol Medley"
- "Emptiness & Aitebar"
- "Hey There Delilah"
- "Sayonee/Saeen/Zamane Ke Andaaz"
- "Neend Aati Nahi"

=== Pakistan Super League ===
- "Kitna Rola Dalay Ga" – Islamabad United

=== Heer Maan Ja ===
- "Chan Mahi" – Heer Maan Ja

== Controversy ==
In August 2021, Abdullah Qureshi apologized publicly via Instagram story for sending inappropriate messages to random people online. He stated “I won’t blame my drunken state because it was me at the end of the day,” he wrote, adding, “but yes, I did have a drinking problem and I do have fetishes.”
