= Indus Valley School of Art and Architecture =

Art school in Karachi, Pakistan

- دانشکده فن و تعمیر دره سند
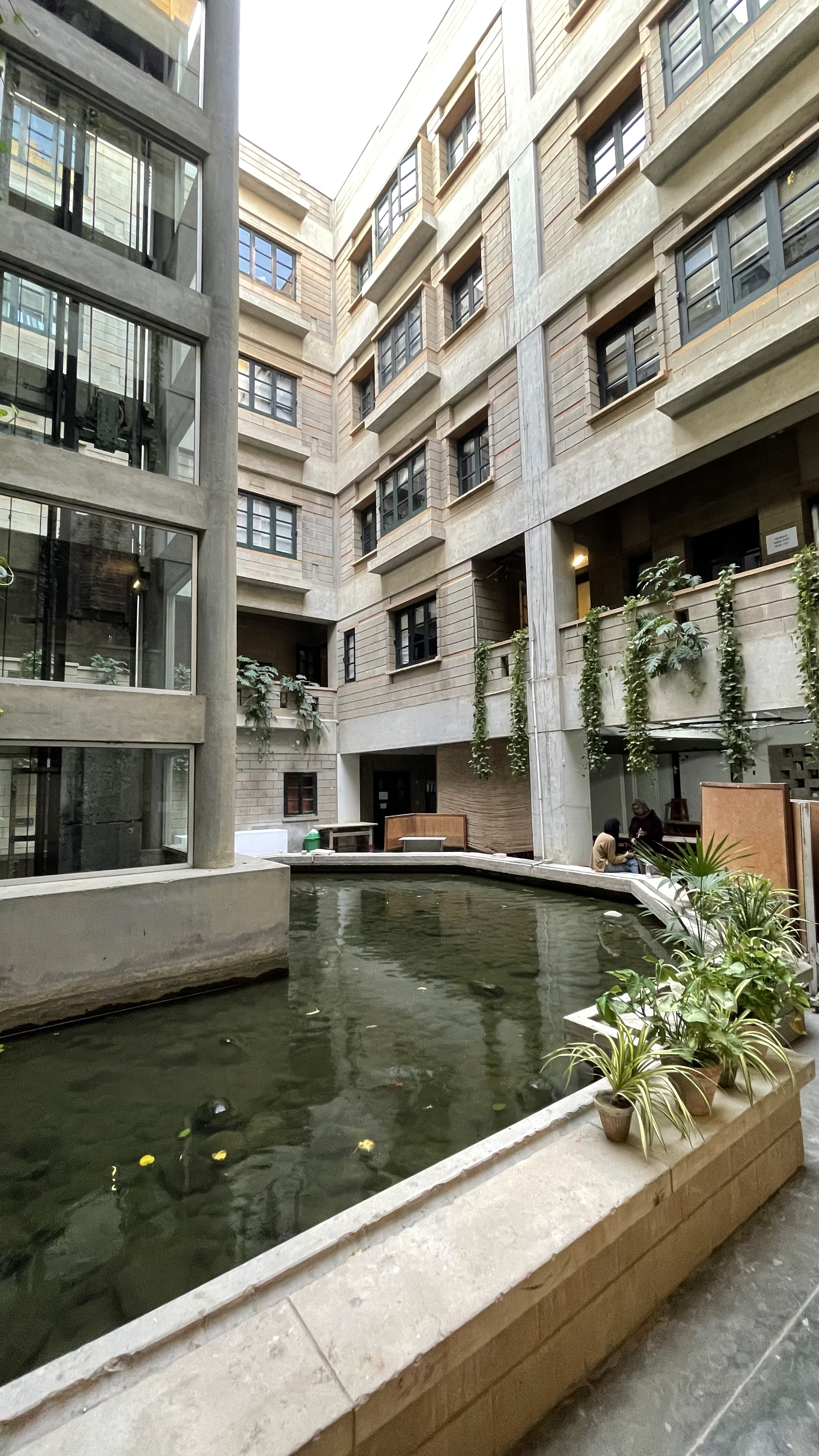
- A view framed between the buildings.
- Type: Private
- Established: 1989; Institution actually opened in 1990
- Dean: Faiza Mushtaq
- Director: Faiza Mushtaq (Executive Director)
- Location: Karachi, Sindh, Pakistan; 24.8118°N 67.0158°E
- Nickname: IVS
- Website: www.indusvalley.edu.pk

Indus Valley School of Art and Architecture (Urdu: دانشکده فن و تعمیر دره سند) (Sindhi: انڊس ويلي اسڪول آف آرٽ اينڊ آرڪيٽيڪچر) is a not-for-profit degree awarding institution in Karachi, Sindh, Pakistan. The university was established in 1989, thereby empowering it to award its own degrees and was the fourth private institution of higher learning in Pakistan to be given a university status. As of 2008, IVS was the third highest ranking art and design university in Pakistan.

The degrees offered include a 5-year degree program in Architecture and 4 year degree programs in Interior Design, Textile and Communication Design, and Fine Arts. The core degree courses are supported throughout the curriculum with liberal arts courses as well. In 2020, IVS commenced its first graduate programme, M.Phil. in Art and Design. It is a two-year degree focusing on nurturing critical and creative practice.

IVS was founded by

- Arshad Abdulla - Architect
- Haamid N. Jaffer - Businessman
- Imran Mir - Artist and Designer
- Inayat Ismail - Chartered Accountant
- Nighat Mir - Designer
- Noorjehan Bilgrami - Artist, Designer, Researcher
- Shahid Abdulla - Architect
- Shahid Sajjad - Artist, notable sculptor.
- Shehnaz Ismail - Textile Designer, Educator, President's Pride of Performance Award
- Syed Akeel Bilgrami - Architect, Educator.

The founders felt and believed that such a school was critically needed in Karachi.

== Programs ==
- Architecture
- Interior Design
- Communication Design
- Textile Design
- Fine Art and Design
- Liberal Arts
- Fashion Design
- Graduate Programme: M.Phil. in Art and Design

== Alumni ==
- Madiha Imam - Actress
- Sarwat Gilani - Actress and model
- Mojiz Hasan - Artist, actor, director, designer
- Bilal Maqsood - Artist, singer, musician, songwriter, composer
- Huma Mulji - Artist and educator
- Omar Omari - Architect, Member Provincial Assembly (PTI)
- Adeela Suleman - Sculptor with exhibitions that are scattered across the globe; had studied art at this institution.
- Shamoon Sultan - Textile Designer - Owner and Founder of Khaadi

The I.V.S. Alumni Association was established in November 2001 and is supported by the school. The association periodically publishes a newsletter, organizes social events and keeps a close liaison with the school. The alumni office is located on the campus.

== Computer laboratory ==
- Agha Hasan Abedi is a Computer Laboratory for computer-generated design projects. This laboratory was newly refurbished in 2011.

== Library ==
- Marium Abdulla Library The establishment of the Marium Abdulla Library (MAL) coincided with the inception of the Indus Valley School of Art and Architecture in 1989.

== Media ==
The popular Pakistani Hum TV Television serial Zindagi Gulzar Hai was filmed at Indus Valley School of Art and Architecture.

== See also ==
- Farah Mahbub (photographer)
