= Faiza Saleem =

Pakistani comedian

Faiza Saleem is a lawyer turned comedian based in Karachi. She was the first female social media entertainer to have pursued stand-up comedy in Pakistan and also led and trained the subcontinent's first all-female comedy troupe, The Khawatoons. Faiza has been active on television and made her film debut with the comedy film Parchi.

== Early life ==
Faiza Saleem spent a lot of her time in Germany but was born and raised in Karachi. The youngest of four siblings, she took her bachelor's degree in LLB from Shaheed Zulfikar Ali Bhutto Institute of Science and Technology. Later she worked at a public policy think tank where she was head of the legal department.

== Career ==
Faiza Saleem's entry into comedy began when she started the "Pseudo Burger Diaries" and continued making memes on the same. Following that she released her first video ‘Baji...eww’ which was based on the dichotomy between Defence and Nazimabad. Her content revolves around deep rooted gender stereotyping and body shaming, among other issues. Later, she joined an improv comedy troupe called "The Platoon" followed by doing regular standup comedy shows. Her all-female improv troupe, "The Khawatoons", has performed both in Pakistan and internationally. After working in theatre and social media, she worked on TV, playing Rashk-e-Qamar in Dildaariyaan, then played, in a cameo role, Faiza Saleem and Sumaira Khanjarwali in Parchi. More recently she has made an interview-based web-series with her show Doodhpatti with Dadi and 2-minutes with Faiza Saleem.
