= Hareem Farooq =

Pakistani actress and producer

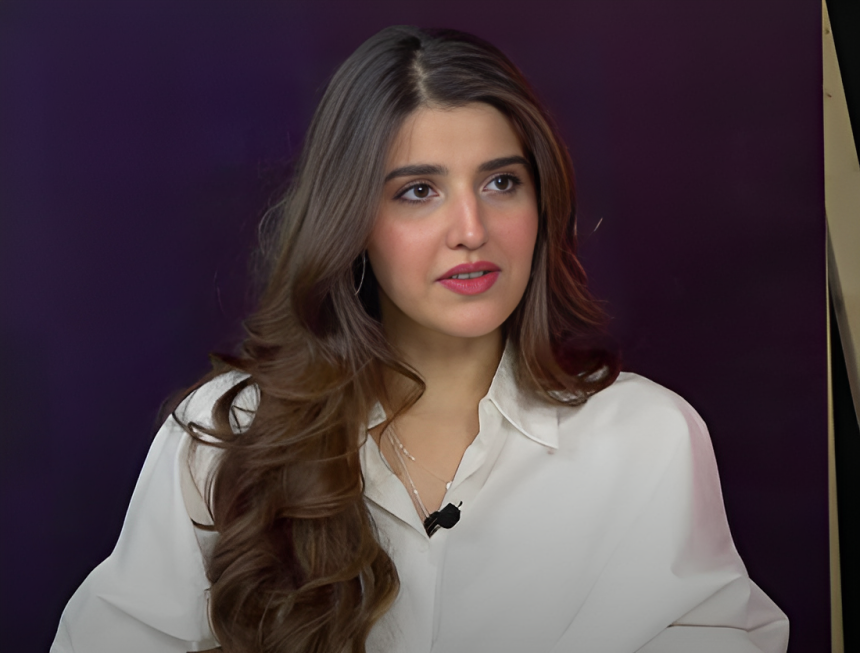
- Hareem Farooq in 2023
- Born: Islamabad, Pakistan
- Education: Quaid-i-Azam University (B.A)
- Occupations: Actress, Producer
- Years active: 2012–present (Actress) , 2000– 2018 (Singer)
- Relatives: Abdullah Qureshi (cousin)

Hareem Farooq (Urdu: حریم فاروق) is a Pakistani theatre, film, and television actress, film producer and singer. She began her career with theater, playing the lead role of Fatima Jinnah in Pawnay 14 August and Kiran in the stage play adaptation of the popular Pakistani sitcom Aangan Terha. She made her screen debut with a leading role in the 2013 horror thriller film Siyaah, which earned her a nomination at Lux Style Award for Best Actress.

In addition to films, she appeared in the 2014 Hum TV's romantic television serial Mausam, for which she received Hum Award for Best Television Sensation Female, and followed it with the successful series, such as Mere Humdum Mere Dost (2014), Dusri Bivi (2014), and Diyar-e-Dil (2015). She co-produced and starred in the 2016 romance Janaan, followed by the comedies Parchi (2018) and Heer Maan Ja (2019). She is the first female celebrity to get the honor of hosting Pakistan Super League in the same year (2018).

== Early life ==
Hareem Farooq was born in Islamabad and spent most of her time in that city before she moved with her family to Karachi. Her parents are both doctors, her father being a public health PhD and international consultant while her mother is a dermatologist. The actress received early education from Karachi Grammar School. She did her bachelor's degree in Sociology and Journalism from Quaid-e-Azam University, Islamabad, after which she began her career in acting. Singer Abdullah Qureshi is her cousin.

== Career ==
Farooq began her career in 2012 in theatre playing the leading role of Fatima Jinnah in Pawnay 14 August and Jahan Ara Begum in Aangan Terha which originally played by Bushra Ansari. The following year, she made her big screen debut with a leading role in the 2013 horror thriller film Siyaah. Farooq made her television debut with Mausam alongside Ahsan Khan and Yumna Zaidi in 2014. Her roles in romances Dusri Biwi and Mere Humdum Mere Dost brought little recognition to her. Her portrayal of a young-to-old family devoted lady in ensemble family drama Diyar-e-Dil proved to be a major breakthrough for her. She was then starred in Sanam as a victim of bipolar disorder alongside Osman Khalid Butt and Maya Ali. In the same year, she played the lead role in the film Dobara Phir Se and was a co-producer of the feature film Janaan where she also appeared in a cameo role. She appeared in the comedy flick Parchi as the lead role in which she played the character of a female don, with co-stars Ali Rehman Khan, Ahmed Ali Akbar and Usman Mukhtar in lead roles.

In addition to a successful and growing acting career, in 2015, Farooq ventured into productions, by joining her childhood best friend and producer of her debut film, Imran Raza Kazmi as a partner in IRK Films and went on to produce Janaan with him, followed by her 2018 blockbuster Parchi.

In the year 2018, she also went into forming a global entertainment company, IHA Entertainment with Arif Lakhani and Imran Raza Kazmi, which soon entered into an agreement with top entertainment in the Kingdom of Saudi Arabia (KSA), as the first distribution firm. Hareem is also the first female celebrity to get the honor of hosting The Pakistan Super League in February 2018, where she hosted the 3rd PSL opening ceremony in Dubai. She has also signed on to become the official Spokesperson for Loreal Professional, Pakistan in 2017.

== Filmography ==
Key
†	Denotes film / drama that has not released yet
†	Denotes films / drama that are currently on cinema / on air

=== Films ===
Year	Title	Role	Notes	Ref.
2013	Siyaah	Zara	Debut	
2016	Janaan	Herself (Cameo)	Co-producer	
2016	Dobara Phir Se	Zainab		
2017	Allahyar and the Legend of Markhor		Cameo appearance	
2018	Parchi	Eman	Co-producer	
2019	Heer Maan Ja	Heer	Co-producer	
2024	Abhi			
TBA	Mango Jutt †	TBA		

=== Television ===
Year	Title	Role	Network	Notes	Ref(s)
2014	Mausam	Saman		Television Debut	
2014	Mere Humdum Mere Dost	Sajeela			
2014	Dusri Bivi	Ayesha Hassan			
2015	Diyar-e-Dil	Arjumand Khan	Hum TV		
2015	Mere Jeevan Saathi	Habiba			
2015	Tere Baghair	Rabia Salman			
2016	Dil-e-Beqarar	Farida Javed			
2016	Sanam	Ayla			
2017	Baaghi	Pakistan Idol Judge		Cameo appearance	
2018	Main Khayal Hoon Kisi Aur Ka	Dania			
2019	Dolly Darling	Herself		To promote "Heer Maan Ja"	
2023	Sar-e-Rah	Mariyum	ARY Digital		
2023	22 Qadam	Farheen	Green Entertainment		
2024	Bismil	Masooma	ARY Digital		
2025	SharPasand	Sanam	ARY Digital		
2026	Bhaag †	TBA	TBA		

=== Other appearances ===
Year	Title	Role	Notes	Ref(s)
2014	Eid Hungama	Herself		
2017	Miss Veet Pakistan	Herself	Celebrity Judge	
2018	Miss Veet Pakistan	Herself	Celebrity Judge	

== Awards and nominations ==
Year	Ceremony	Category	Work	Result	Ref(s)
2014	13th Lux Style Awards	Best Film Actress	Siyaah	Nominated	
2015	3rd Hum Awards	Best Television Sensation Female	Mausam	Won	
2025	2nd Sukooon Kya Drama Hai Icon Awards	Best Performance in a Negative Role (Popular Choice)	Bismil	Nominated	
2026	3rd Pakistan International Screen Awards	Best Actress in a Negative Role	Bismil	Nominated	
