= Maham Amir =

Pakistani actress

Maham Aamir
- Occupations: Actress‚ Model and Host
- Years active: 2014–present
- Known for: Ready Steady Go as Noshi

Maham Aamir is a Pakistani actress who appears in Urdu-language television series. She is known for her role as Sualeha the ghost in Saaya and Noshi in Ready Steady Go.

== Career ==
Aamir began her career as a host on Salam Sindh, a program on Sindh TV. She made her acting debut in a supporting role in the 2014 ARY Digital television serial Doosri Biwi, and followed it with brief roles in several television serials. She portrayed the lead role of Sauleha, a ghost, in the 2018 Geo TV horror serial Saaya. Later, Aamir appeared in several Geo Entertainment popular soap serials, including Rishton Ki Dor, Babul Ka Angna, Roshni and, Ek Hi Bhool. She also portrayed the role of a Punjabi girl in Teri Meri Jodi. She received critical acclaim for her role as Noshi in the sitcom Ready Steady Go.

== Filmography ==
=== Television ===
| Year | Show | Role | Notes |
|---|---|---|---|
| 2014 | Dusri Biwi | Fouzia | |
| 2015 | Unsuni | | |
| 2015-2016 | Rishton Ki Dor | Zara | |
| 2015-2016 | Teri Meri Jodi | Mitro | |
| 2016 | Babul Ka Angna | Mehwish | |
| 2016 | Tum Milay | Hooriya | |
| 2016 | Roshni | Roshni | |
| 2017 | Ek Hi Bhool | Masooma | |
| 2017-2020 | Ready Steady Go | Noshi | |
| 2018 | Saaya | Sualeha | |
| 2018 | Madventures (season 03) | Contestant | Reality Show |
| 2019 | Bulbulay | Kamroosh | Guest Appearance |
| 2019 | Hum 2 Humare 100 | | Telefilm |
| 2019 | Dolly Darling | Mano | Episode 39 |
| 2021 | Shehnai | Samreen | |
| 2022 | Koyal | Pakiza | |
| 2022–23 | Aik Thi Laila | Inspector Rukaiyya | |
| 2025 | Bahar Nagar | | |
