= Humaira Asghar =

Pakistani actress and model (1983–2024)

- Asghar in 2022
- Born: Humaira Asghar Ali Chaudhry; 10 October 1983; Lahore, Punjab, Pakistan
- Died: c. 7 October 2024 (aged 40); Karachi, Sindh, Pakistan
- Body discovered: 8 July 2025
- Resting place: Lahore, Punjab, Pakistan
- Occupations: Actress; model; theatre artist
- Years active: 2014–2024
- Known for: Tamasha (2022); Ehsaan Faramosh (2023)

Humaira Asghar Ali Chaudhry (Note: Urdu: حمیرا اصغر علی چودھری) (10 October 1983 – c. 7 October 2024) was a Pakistani actress, model and theatre artist.

Asghar began her career performing with Rafi Peer Theatre during her college years before entering the fashion industry, modelling for several prominent brands. Asghar appeared in various Pakistani television dramas including Benaam, Just Married, Chal Dil Mere, Sirat-e-Mustaqeem (Laali), Guru, and Ehsaan Faramosh, and gained wider recognition through the reality show Tamasha, which aired on ARY Digital. Her film appearances include a modelling role in the 2015 action-thriller Jalaibee and a lead role in Aik Tha Badshah.

== Early life and education ==
Humaira Asghar was born on 10 October 1983 (Note: According to investigators, Asghar altered her CNIC to change her birthdate. The original identity card listed 10 October 1983 as her date of birth, while a tampered version showed 10 October 1997. Some sources have also cited 1992 as her year of birth.) in Lahore, the daughter of an army doctor. She was a qualified visual artist, having studied painting and sculpture at the National College of Arts and the College of Art & Design at University of the Punjab. Her artworks predominantly explored the role of women in building societies and promoting women's empowerment, often drawing inspiration from Urdu poetry and literature.

== Career ==
Asghar began her artistic journey during her college years with the Rafi Peer Theatre, which later led her into the world of modelling. She gained wider recognition after securing third position in the Veet Miss Super Model title in 2014, and went on to model for several major brands before transitioning into television and film.

Asghar appeared in various Pakistani television dramas and films throughout her career. She was best known for participating in ARY Digital's reality show Tamasha, which followed a format similar to the international franchise Big Brother. In television, she acted in serials such as Benaam, Just Married, Love Vaccine, Chal Dil Mere, Sirat-e-Mustaqeem (Laali), Ehsaan Faramosh, and Guru. In film, Humaira made an appearance in the 2015 action-thriller Jalaibee, where she was also featured as a model. She also played a lead role in the film Aik Tha Badshah (2016) alongside Ali Hamza and Ali Noor.

In 2022, a video showing a woman walking playfully in front of a burning hillside while wearing a silver gown went viral on TikTok. It was initially believed to feature Humaira Asghar Ali. International media outlets, including AFP, mistakenly reported the clip under her name. However, the video was later confirmed to have been posted by TikTok user Dollyofficiall, who had captioned it "Fire erupts wherever I am". The error was widely noted and subsequently clarified.

In 2023, she received a National Woman Leadership Award for her contribution to media and entertainment.

Asghar's final known activity was a fashion shoot for a magazine in late September 2024, which coincided with her last Instagram post; the stylist involved in that shoot later stated that he last interacted with her in October 2024.

== Death ==
On 8 July 2025, Asghar was found dead in her apartment in DHA Phase VI, Karachi, during a court-ordered eviction due to months of unpaid rent. She had lived in the rented flat since 2018. A foul odour from the flat led police and a bailiff to break into the locked apartment, where they discovered her body in a decomposed state.

According to the police, all doors and windows, including the balcony, were locked from the inside, and there were no signs of forced entry or struggle, suggesting no immediate evidence of foul play. Other officials reported that the balcony door was left open.

A post-mortem was conducted at the Jinnah Postgraduate Medical Centre (JPMC), which confirmed that the body was in an "advanced state of decomposition". The autopsy, dated 8 July 2025, revealed that the remains were partially mummified and skeletal. Based on forensic and digital evidence, including call detail records, social media inactivity, expired food items, and the extent of decomposition, investigators and medical experts concluded that Asghar most likely died in or around October 2024, approximately eight to ten months prior to the examination. This estimate was significantly longer than the initial six-month timeframe earlier suggested by law enforcement agencies. Further analysis of her call records determine that Asghar's phone was last used on 7 October 2024 at around 5 PM, during which she contacted 14 individuals. This has led investigators to conclude that she most likely died on 7 October 2024, three days before her 41st birthday. She had reportedly been missing since that date. Due to the advanced state of decomposition, a cause of death could not be determined.

Asghar was buried on 11 July 2025 at the Q Block graveyard in Model Town, Lahore. Her funeral was reportedly attended by only a small number of people. Her death sparked a debate about women's rights in Pakistan and her parents' lack of recognition for the deceased daughter.

== Filmography ==
=== Television ===
Year	Title	Role	Network	Notes
2021	Benaam	Maham	ARY Digital	
2022	Tamasha	Herself	ARY Digital	Reality show
2022	Sirat-e-Mustaqeem (Laali)	Sumbul	ARY Digital	Anthology, episodic appearance
2023	Guru	Mona	Express Entertainment	
2023	Ehsaan Faramosh	Nazish	ARY Digital	

=== Web series ===
Year	Title	Role	Notes
2021	Just Married	Natasha	Teeli

=== Film ===
Year	Title	Role	Notes
2015	Jalaibee	Model	
2016	Aik Tha Badsha	The Queen	Short

=== Telefilm ===
Year	Title	Role	Network	Notes
2021	Love Vaccine	Nirma	ARY Digital	Telefilm
2022	Chal Dil Mere	Asma	Hum TV	

== See also ==
- Kodokushi
- Joyce Vincent
- Death of Hedviga Golik
- Sogen Kato
- List of solved missing person cases (2020s)
