= Joyce Vincent =

British unsolved death (1965–2003)

- Studio photograph of Vincent
- Born: Joyce Carol Vincent; 19 October 1965; Hammersmith, London, England
- Died: c. December 2003 (aged 38); Wood Green, London, England
- Body discovered: 25 January 2006

Joyce Carol Vincent (19 October 1965 – c. December 2003) was a British woman whose death went unnoticed for more than two years as her corpse lay undiscovered at her bedsit in north London. Prior to her death, she had cut off nearly all contact with those who knew her. She resigned from her job in 2001, and moved into a shelter for victims of domestic abuse. Around the same time, she began to reduce contact with friends and family. She died sometime in December 2003. Her remains were discovered on 25 January 2006, with the cause of death believed to be either an asthma attack or complications from a recent peptic ulcer.

Vincent's life and death were the topic of Dreams of a Life, a 2011 docudrama film. The film and Vincent's life inspired musician Steven Wilson's album Hand. Cannot. Erase.

== Life ==
Joyce Vincent was born in London's Hammersmith area on 19 October 1965 and raised near Fulham Palace Road. Her parents had immigrated to London from Grenada; she was of Dougla descent. Her father, Lawrence, was a carpenter of African descent and her mother, Lyris, was of Indian descent. Lyris died when Vincent was 11, and her four older sisters took responsibility for her upbringing. She had a strained relationship with her emotionally distant father, who she claimed had died in 2001 (he actually died in 2004, unaware that Vincent had predeceased him). She attended Melcombe Primary School and Fulham Gilliatt School for Girls, and left school at age 16 with no qualifications. She had a wide circle of friends in the music industry and when she was 24, she attended and was video recorded in the backstage audience at the concert Nelson Mandela: An International Tribute for a Free South Africa in April 1990 at Wembley Stadium. Reportedly, she met Mandela at the concert and shook his hand.

In 1985, Vincent began working as a secretary at OCL in the City of London. She later worked at C. Itoh and Law Debenture before joining Ernst & Young. She worked at Ernst & Young for four years in the treasury department, but resigned in March 2001 for unknown reasons. Shortly afterward, Vincent spent some time in a domestic abuse shelter in Haringey and worked as a cleaner in a budget hotel. During this period, she became estranged from her family. A source involved in the investigation said: "She detached herself from her family but there was no bust-up. They are a really nice family. We understand she was in a relationship and there was a history of domestic violence." It has been speculated that she was either ashamed to be a victim of domestic abuse or did not want to be found by her abuser.

In February 2003, Vincent was moved into the bedsit flat above Wood Green Shopping City where she later died. The flat was owned by the Metropolitan Housing Trust and was used to house victims of abuse. In November 2003, after vomiting blood, she was hospitalised at North Middlesex Hospital for two days, due to a peptic ulcer.

== Death ==
Vincent lived above the Shopping City in Wood Green in North London in a Housing Trust flat. The cause of her death is unknown, as is the date, though it is speculated to be around December 2003. She suffered from asthma and had a peptic ulcer at the time of her death; as such, some have suggested an asthma attack or complications surrounding her recent peptic ulcer as a possible cause of death. Her remains were described as "mostly skeletal" according to the pathologist, and she was lying on her back, next to a shopping bag, surrounded by Christmas presents she had wrapped.

Neighbours had assumed the flat was unoccupied, and the odour of decomposing body tissue was attributed to nearby waste bins. The flat's windows did not allow direct sight to the inside. It was a noisy building which may explain why no one questioned the constant noise from the television, which remained turned on until she was discovered. Half of her rent was being automatically paid to Metropolitan Housing Trust by benefits agencies, leading officials to believe that she was still alive. With over two years' worth of unpaid rent totalling £2,400 that had accrued, housing officials decided to repossess the property. Her corpse was discovered on 25 January 2006 when bailiffs had forced entry into the flat. The television and heating were still running due to debt forgiveness and her bills being continually paid through automatic debit.

The Metropolitan Housing Trust said that due to housing benefits covering the costs of rent for some period after Vincent's death, arrears had not been realised until much later. The Trust also said that no concerns were raised by neighbours or visitors at any time during the two years between her death and the discovery of her body.

Vincent's remains were too badly decomposed to conduct a full post-mortem, and she had to be identified through dental records. Police ruled death by natural causes as there was nothing to suggest foul play. The front door was double locked and there was no sign of a break-in. Her sisters had hired a private detective to look for her and contacted the Salvation Army, but these attempts proved unsuccessful. The detective found the previous address where Vincent had been living, and the family wrote letters to her there, receiving no response. As a result, the family concluded she had deliberately broken ties with them.

== In popular culture ==
=== Dreams of a Life ===
A film about Vincent, Dreams of a Life, written and directed by Carol Morley with Zawe Ashton playing Vincent, was released in 2011. Morley tracked down and interviewed people who had known Vincent. They described a beautiful, intelligent, socially active woman, "upwardly mobile" and "a high flyer", who they assumed "was off somewhere having a better life than they were". During her life, she met figures such as Nelson Mandela, Ben E. King, Gil Scott-Heron and Betty Wright, spoke on the telephone with Isaac Hayes and had also been to dinner with Stevie Wonder.

=== Steven Wilson album ===
On 4 November 2014, Steven Wilson announced that his fourth solo album, titled Hand. Cannot. Erase., would be based on the life of Vincent. According to Wilson, he was inspired to create a concept album after seeing Dreams of a Life. From the book that accompanied the deluxe release of the album it is clear that the central character, 'H.', is a highly fictionalised version of Vincent: she is born on 8 October 1978 to an Italian mother and dies or disappears on 22 December 2014. Her only sister is 'J.', who was briefly fostered by her parents prior to their divorce. In the album and book the Christmas presents are intended for H.'s estranged brother and his family.

=== Miss Vincent ===
After researching Vincent's story (referenced in Alkaline Trio's song "Queen of Pain"), frontman Alex Marshall was inspired to write a song about her life. The song was initially titled "Miss Vincent" but the band eventually decided to change the song's title to "No One Knew" and used the song's original title to name the band instead.

== See also ==
- Death of Hedviga Golik – Croatian solved missing person case
- Humaira Asghar – Pakistani actress and model (1983–2024)
- Sogen Kato – 2010 Japanese fraud case
- Kodokushi – Japanese phenomenon of people dying alone and remaining undiscovered for a long period of time
- List of solved missing person cases (2000s)
- List of unsolved deaths
