= Bombay Tailors =

Pakistani television series

- Written by: Amtul Shahida
- Directed by: Mazhar Moin
- Starring: Ali Ansari; Anika Zulfikar; Sania Saeed; Tanveer Ahmed; Ali Safina; Dania Enwer; Ali Tahir
- Country of origin: Pakistan
- Original language: Urdu
- No. of seasons: 1
- No. of episodes: 35

Production
- Producer: Moomal Shunaid
- Production companies: Moomal Productions; MD Productions

Original release
- Network: Hum TV
- Release: 13 July – 9 November 2026

Bombay Tailors is a Pakistani television drama series that aired on Hum TV in 2026. It was directed by Mazhar Moin and produced by Moomal Shunaid Productions and MD Productions. The series features Ali Ansari and Anika Zulfikar in the lead roles, alongside Sania Saeed, Ali Safina, Dania Enwer, Ali Tahir and Tanveer Ahmed.

The story centres on Saifi, a young man whose family expects him to continue its traditional tailoring business, despite his personal ambitions. His life becomes connected with Mahrukh, a young woman who creates online content while facing restrictions imposed by her family. Their relationship develops amid differences in family expectations, generational attitudes and ideas about individual independence.

== Cast ==
- Ali Ansari as Saifi
- Anika Zulfikar as Mahrukh
- Sania Saeed
- Tanveer Ahmed
- Ali Safina
- Dania Enwer
- Ali Tahir

== Reception ==
In a review published in Dawn in August 2026, Sadaf Haider discussed the drama's treatment of family relationships and its portrayal of a forced marriage. The review praised the performances of Ali Ansari and Anika Zulfikar for their restrained portrayals, while criticising aspects of the writing and character development.
