= Death of Hedviga Golik =

Croatian solved missing person case

Hedviga Golik
- Born: 1924; Fiume, Kingdom of Italy
- Died: c. 1966 (aged 41–42); Zagreb, SR Croatia, SFR Yugoslavia
- Body discovered: 12 May 2008
- Occupation: Nurse
- Known for: Unsolved death and body remaining undiscovered for 42 years

Hedviga Golik (1924–1966) was a Croatian woman who died of unknown natural causes alone in her apartment. Her body remained undisturbed for 42 years until it was discovered in May 2008.

== Life ==
Golik was a former nurse, originally from Rijeka, who lived in the Medveščak neighbourhood of Zagreb, near Gupčeva zvijezda square. She resided in an 18-square-metre (190 sq ft) one-room attic apartment, isolated from the lower floors of the four-storey building, from 1961. Her last place of employment was at Trešnjevka's community health center. The flat was provided by the building's superintendent, Hinković, who was formerly her boyfriend. Both were purported to be Jehovah's Witnesses and it was reported that Hinković had been involved in the construction of the building, having received the attic apartment in lieu of payment. She was known to have a sister who worked as a school teacher in Zagreb; however, they reportedly broke off contact due to quarreling.

A neighbour, Katica Carić, described Golik as eccentric and prone to mood swings. She switched between being quiet and reclusive, and extremely belligerent and hectic. She never socialized with other tenants, but was known for yelling at people for any reason and aimlessly running around the street. She often had angry outbursts even when she was helped and it was suspected that she had schizophrenia. Carić ran errands for her, such as buying groceries, but they never talked, as Golik would not leave her floor, instead lowering a bucket with money and a written list down the stairs, with the items to be dropped off on Golik's doorstep. Golik often left for extended periods, during which time she rented the apartment out to others. Carić claimed to have last seen Golik outside her apartment in the company of two or three young men, the year being quoted as either 1963, 1967, or 1973.

== Death and speculation ==
In 1966, Golik prepared a cup of tea for herself and settled down to watch television in her apartment. At some point, she died. Golik had told her neighbours that she would be leaving for an indeterminate amount of time. Common rumours were that she joined a sect in SR Macedonia, while others assumed that she had moved out to live with relatives in Belgrade. Residents did not enter Golik's apartment, stating upon the discovery of her body, "We were afraid to enter the apartment earlier so as not to violate the tenancy agreement."

Zagreb police stated that Golik was never officially reported missing, but they did have a record of her disappearance through a neighbour from 1973. An informal search for Golik across Yugoslavia in the early 1970s was unsuccessful. No family ever came forward.

Apparently, the residents had suspected Golik's death as early as 1981, as they paid for a loan settlement then. The death was not reported, however, as her neighbours argued over who would get ownership of Golik's apartment. The tenants believed each of them had the right to at least 1 square metre (11 sq ft). Some had argued that the apartment was not owned by her to begin with, but the private dispute continued. In 1991, tenant representative Mirko Horvatić reported to the city authorities that the apartment had been abandoned, but he received no response due to the onset of the Yugoslav Wars. Contradicting later police assertions, Horvatić stated that Golik was known to have been missing for 25 years by this point. In 1998, someone attached the following handwritten note, signed "City of Zagreb, Census Commission" ("Grad Zagreb, Komisija za popis stanovništva") to the flat's front door:

Na temelju Zakona o nasljeđivanju stanarka H. Golik ostala je bez vlasništva - nasljedništva. Do rješenja vlasničkih prava stanari ne mogu raspolagati stanom a svaki pokušaj raspolaganja je krivično djelo

[Based on the law on inheritance for tenants, H. Golik was left without ownership - inheritance. Until the resolution of ownership rights, the tenants cannot take possession of the apartment and any attempt to claim it is a criminal offense.]

The author was an anonymous resident; however, the neighbours believed the message and ceased their attempts to lay claim to the flat.

== Discovery of body ==
In 2008, the building complex was to be renovated into condominiums with the agreement of residents. Only Golik had not responded to the request. Three representatives broke open the attic apartment's door on May 12, 2008 and discovered Golik's body, lying on her bed, wrapped in blankets, in front of her TV. Her teacup, which she had been sipping from, remained on a table next to her chair. Nothing in her home had been disturbed, though it was adorned with numerous cobwebs. The police removed her body from her apartment. An autopsy was unable to determine her cause of death, nor the exact time.

The date of death was initially believed to be in 1973. The Institute of Forensic Medicine and Criminalistics of the Faculty of Medicine, University of Zagreb was tasked with identifying the body in 2008. They conducted the autopsy, concluding that she most likely died during a cold season and that the isolated position of the apartment allowed the decomposition to go unnoticed until mummification set in. While the windows of the apartment were found open, deputy institute representative Davor Strinović said that the smell of rot should have been noticeable during the early stages, which neighbours claimed only became noticeable when the apartment was unlocked. A police spokesperson stated "So far, we have no idea how it is possible that someone officially reported missing so long ago was not found before in the same apartment she used to live in". The electricity was not turned off in the roughly 42 years since Golik's death. The bill was regularly paid by the original architect of the building, also residing in Zagreb, who had died three months earlier.

== Aftermath ==
Golik's body was buried the next day. Her story was picked up by several media outlets around the world.

== See also ==
- Humaira Asghar
- Joyce Vincent
- Kodokushi
- List of solved missing person cases (1950–1969)
- List of unsolved deaths
