= Guru (TV series) =

2023 Pakistani television series

- Urdu: گرو
- Genre: Drama; Social
- Written by: Likhari
- Directed by: Bilawal Hussain Abbasi
- Creative director: Qaiser Ali
- Starring: Ali Rehman Khan; Hira Khan; Zhalay Sarhadi; Umer Alam
- Theme music composer: Shadab Alam Sher
- Opening theme: "Main Guru" Sung by Azhar Ali and Mohsin Ejaz
- Ending theme: Soja Pyaare (Lori) by Shadab Alam
- Composer: Shadab Alam Sher
- Country of origin: Pakistan
- Original language: Urdu
- No. of seasons: 1
- No. of episodes: 26

Production
- Executive producers: Hassan Syed Zia; Maaz Imrani
- Producers: Wajahat Rauf; Shazia Wajahat
- Editors: Anzak and Ashar
- Camera setup: Multiple-camera setup
- Running time: 36 Minutes
- Production company: Showcase Productions

Original release
- Network: Express Entertainment
- Release: 7 June 2023 – present

Guru is a 2023 Pakistani television series directed by Bilawal Hussain Abbasi, produced by Shazia Wajahat & Wajahat Rauf and written by Likhari.It stars Ali Rehman Khan, and Zhalay Sarhadi as leads. The series first premiered on 7 June 2023 on Express Entertainment.

== Plot ==
The drama revolves around the story of Guru, a transgender person. Guru faces many challenges and struggles to survive from the evil of society but never loses hope. After returning from a wedding, Guru finds an abandoned baby girl on the way back home. They bring the baby with them and take care of her. Guru loves the abandoned baby girl and meets her needs. They do everything to give that baby girl a good life and style.

Episode 1

Guru is at a wedding with his 3 friends dancing. While returning from a well-earned night, they are met with rainstorm and make a stop under a bridge for the weather to settle. On the same night, Fakhira goes into labor and is told by her husband to not bring any more daughters' home. She has twin girls and fearing her husband, she hands over 1 baby to the nurse to give to a childless couple. The nurse couldn't find any family so leaves the baby in street. Guru finds the baby and brings her home much to chagrin of his roommates. Guru's neighbors get curious about the baby noises coming from Guru's home.

== Cast ==
- Ali Rehman Khan as Sattar aka Guru
- Hira Khan as Mariam
- Zhalay Sarhadi as Fakhraa
- Mohsin Ejaz as Waseem
- Umer Alam as Salaar
- Irfan Motiwala as Zamaan
- Shehryar Zaidi as Master Majeed
- Fouzia Mushtaq
- Raweha
- Ahmer Hussain as Surraiyya
- Omi Butt as Bijli
- Hassan Kamal as Kashish
- Kauser Siddiqui as Rubina
- Humaira Asghar as Mona
- Reham Rafiq
- Aisha

== Production ==
In April 2023, it was reported that Ali Rehman Khan will play the role of a transgender person in an upcoming drama. The teaser trailer for the series released by the Express Entertainment on 31 May 2023 and premiered the first episode on 7 June 2023.
