= Shahrukh Ki Saliyan =

Pakistani television series

- Ahsan Khan (left) and Ramsha Khan
- شاہ رخ کی سالیاں
- Genre: Sitcom; Romance; Humour
- Written by: Muhammad Younis Butt
- Directed by: Mazhar Moin
- Starring: Ahsan Khan; Ramsha Khan; Raza Zaidi; Rehan Sheikh; Aruba Mirza; Namra Shahid; Ali Ansari (actor)
- Country of origin: Pakistan
- Original language: Urdu
- No. of episodes: 33

Production
- Producers: Abdullah Kadwani; Asad Qureshi
- Production locations: Karachi, Sindh
- Camera setup: Multi-camera setup
- Production company: 7th Sky Entertainment

Original release
- Network: Geo Entertainment
- Release: 8 June 2019 – 12 January 2020

Shahrukh Ki Saliyan (Urdu: شاہ رخ کی سالیاں, lit. 'Shahrukh's Sisters-in-Law') is a Pakistani romantic comedy series directed by Mazhar Moin, and produced by Abdullah Kadwani and Asad Qureshi under 7th Sky Entertainment. It features Ahsan Khan and Ramsha Khan in lead roles. The 33-episode series first aired on 8 June 2019.

== Cast ==
- Ahsan Khan as Shahrukh Rao
- Ramsha Khan as Anoushay
- Aruba Mirza as Kitty
- Arez Ahmed as Abu Bakr
- Raza Zaidi as Glucose
- Rehan Sheikh as Havildar Maula Baksh
- Jawed Sheikh as Professor Rao (Shahrukh's father)
- Hina Khawaja Bayat as Mrs Rao (Shahrukh's mother)
- Zohreh Amir as Mikky
- Namra Shahid as Nighar
- Ali Ansari as Dildar

== Awards and nomination ==
Year	Award	Category	Nominee	Result
2020	1st Pakistan International Screen Awards	Best Television Actor in Comedy Role	Ahsan Khan	Nominated
