= Ehsaan Faramosh =

Pakistani television series

- Title screen
- Genre: Drama
- Written by: Tahir Nazeer
- Directed by: Syed Faisal Bukhari
- Starring: Momina Iqbal; Humayun Ashraf; Mashal Khan; Salman Saeed
- Country of origin: Pakistan
- Original language: Urdu
- No. of episodes: 62

Production
- Producer: Abdullah Seja
- Production company: iDream Entertainment

Original release
- Network: ARY Digital
- Release: 8 August – 6 November 2023

Ehsaan Faramosh (Urdu: احسان فراموش; lit. 'ungrateful') is a 2023 Pakistani television drama series. Produced by iDream Entertainment, the 62-episode series premiered on ARY Digital.

== Synopsis ==
The narrative explores love, friendship, betrayal, revenge, and envy. It follows Falak, a self-centered woman from a wealthy family who marries a businessman named Kabeer. She manipulates family relations, pursues modeling and subsequently divorces him after accusing him of domestic violence. She later seeks revenge by targeting his business. Meanwhile, childhood sweethearts Nawal and Hamza reunite after five years, only for Falak to marry Hamza, leaving Nawal heartbroken.

== Cast and characters ==
- Momina Iqbal as Falak
- Humayun Ashraf as Kabeer
- Mashal Khan as Nawal
- Salman Saeed as Hamza
- Supporting cast includes Dania Enwar, Atiqa Odho, Humaira Asghar, Zafar Mehmood, Sadaf Ahsan, Jawaid Iqbal, Sohail Mirza and Rohi Ghazali.

== Reception ==
Ehsaan Faramosh received high television ratings in Pakistan and attracted significant online attention.
