= Seerat =

Pakistani television series

- Also known as: Maria Bint-e-Abdullah
- Developed by: 7th Sky Entertainment
- Written by: Hina Huma Nafees
- Directed by: Saleem Ghanchi
- Starring: Kinza Hashmi; Hamza Firdous; Ali Ansari
- Opening theme: Singers: Sahir Ali Bagga
- Country of origin: Pakistan
- Original language: Urdu
- No. of seasons: 1
- No. of episodes: 55

Production
- Producers: Abdullah Kadwani; Asad Qureshi
- Production location: Pakistan
- Camera setup: Multi-camera setup
- Running time: approx. 40 minutes
- Production company: 7th Sky Entertainment

Original release
- Network: Geo Entertainment
- Release: 18 November 2018 – 29 April 2019

Seerat (Urdu: سیرت, lit. 'Journey'; previously titled Maria Bint-e-Abdullah, Urdu: ماریہ بنت عبد الله, lit. 'Maria, Daughter of Abdullah') is a 2018 Pakistani television series, produced by Abdullah Kadwani and Asad Qureshi under their banner 7th Sky Entertainment. The series aired on Geo TV from 19 November 2018 to 29 April 2019. Kinza Hashmi, Ali Ansari and Hamza Firdous play the lead roles.

The series was formerly a biweekly, and was converted into a daily soap to finish the remaining episodes before Ramadan, due to scheduling conflicts on most Pakistani networks, especially GEO because they telecast a Ramadan transmission nearly all day, allowing very few dramas to be aired in the month of Ramadan.

== Plot ==
The protagonist is Maria, whose father is Muslim and mother is Christian. Maria faces discrimination in her aunt and uncle's house due to her mother. The show shows her inclination towards Islam despite the fact that she has spent most of the time with her mother. The story also reflects the lives of her boss Amar, his brother Danish and Danish's would-be wife.

== Cast ==
- Ali Ansari as Danish
- Kinza Hashmi as Maria
- Hamza Firdous as Ammar
- Sukaina Khan as Kanwal
- Abid Ali as Haji Amir Sahab
- Mariam Mirza as Nisha's mother
- Rubina Ashraf as Sajida
- Arez Ahmed as Sumair
- Zohreh Amir as Nisha
- Seemi Pasha as Danish's mother
- Saman Ansari as Maria's mother
- Sabiha Hashmi as Amar's grandmother
- Omi Butt as Shariq

== Soundtrack ==
Seerat OST

Soundtrack album by Sahir Ali Bagga
- Released: 26 September 2018
- Recorded: 2018
- Genre: Television soundtrack
- Length: (2:27)
- Language: Urdu
- Label: Geo Entertainment

Music Videos
- "Seerat" OST on YouTube

The title song "Sada Rab Waris" was sung by Sahir Ali Bagga, who also composed the music.

== International release ==
The serial was dubbed in Arabic under the title ماریہ بنت عبد الله, released on Viu MENA.
