= Dil Nawaz =

Pakistani television series

- Genre: Supernatural/Romance
- Written by: Syed Nabeel
- Directed by: Najaf Billgrami
- Starring: Neelam Muneer Wahaj Ali Minal Khan
- Country of origin: Pakistan
- Original language: Urdu
- No. of seasons: 1
- No. of episodes: 26

Production
- Producer: Aijaz Aslam
- Production location: Pakistan
- Running time: Approx. 40 minutes

Original release
- Network: A-Plus TV
- Release: 18 September 2017 – 5 March 2018

Dilnawaz is a 2017 Pakistani supernatural romantic drama serial directed Najaf Billgrami, produced by Aijaz Aslam and written by Syed Nabeel. The series features Neelam Muneer, Minal Khan, and Wahaj Ali as the main cast and Najaf Billgrami, Waseem Abbas, Shazia Shah, Nida Mumtaz, Humaira Bano and Zainab Qayyum as the supporting cast.

== Cast ==
- Neelam Muneer as Dilnawaz
- Minal Khan as Kiran
- Wahaj Ali as Fawad
- Najaf Billgrami as Majbzoob
- Waseem Abbas as Khalid
- Shazia Shah as Jahan Ara
- Nida Mumtaz as Rasheeda
- Zainab Qayyum as Alam Ara
- Shazia Qaiser as Bilqees
- Humaira Bano as Afshan

== Soundtrack ==
Dil Nawaz OST

Soundtrack album by Alycia Dias
- Released: 8 September 2017
- Recorded: 2017
- Genre: Television soundtrack
- Length: 2:14
- Language: Urdu
- Label: A-Plus TV
- Producer: Aijaz Aslam

Music video
- Dil Nawaz OST on YouTube

The soundtrack is sung by Alycia Dias.
