= Chemistry (serial) =

2010 Pakistani TV series

- Opening title screen
- Genre: Romance; Drama
- Written by: Syed Nabeel
- Directed by: Syed Ahmad Kamran
- Starring: Sanam Baloch; Faisal Rehman; Iffat Rahim; Danish Taimoor
- Opening theme: "Akhiyaon ki jholi" by Rekha Bhardwaj
- Composer: Vishal Bhardwaj
- Country of origin: Pakistan
- Original language: Urdu

Production
- Producer: Hassan Zia
- Production locations: Comsats Institute, Abbottabad

Original release
- Network: Geo Entertainment
- Release: 8 October 2010

Chemistry (Urdu: کیمسٹری) is a Pakistani Urdu-language drama serial directed by Syed Ahmad Kamran that premiered on Geo Entertainment on 8 October 2010. The main cast includes Sanam Baloch, Faisal Rehman, Iffat Rahim and Danish Taimoor. The drama's tagline reads "Chemistry, subject of love".

== Cast ==
- Sanam Baloch as Rania
- Danish Taimoor as Ramis
- Faisal Rehman as Prof. Waqar
- Iffat Rahim as Maryam
- Humaira Zaheer as Kiran
- Hina Dilpazeer
- Uroosa Siddiqui
- Syed Nabeel
- Saqib Khan
- Asad Zamaan
- Shehzad Jawed
- Shireen Khan

== Title songs ==
The opening sequence, Akhiyon Ki Jholi is sung by Indian vocalist Rekha Bhardwaj and composed by her spouse Vishal Bhardwaj. Another main theme in the serial is the song Zindagi Chocolate Hai, which is sung by the main character, Sanam Baloch.
