= Apni Apni Love Story =

2019 Pakistani television film

- Genre: Romantic comedy
- Written by: Faiza Iftikhar
- Directed by: Kashif Saleem
- Starring: Mahnoor Baloch; Aijaz Aslam; Azfar Rehman; Sadaf Kanwal; Shehnaz Pervaiz; Ayaz Samoo
- Country of origin: Pakistan
- Original language: Urdu

Production
- Running time: 109 minutes
- Production company: Film Factory

Original release
- Network: ARY Digital
- Release: 13 August 2019

Apni Apni Love Story (Urdu: اپنی اپنی لَو سٹوری) is a 2019 Pakistani romantic comedy television film aired on ARY Digital on 13 August 2019. It is directed by Kashif Saleem and written by Faiza Iftikhar under the banner of Film Factory. It has Mahnoor Baloch, Aijaz Aslam, Azfar Rehman, Sadaf Kanwal and Shehnaz Pervaiz in pivotal roles.

== Plot ==
The story revolves around Shanzey and Umar, played by Sadaf Kanwal and Aijaz Aslam respectively. Shanzey is the niece of Umar, and she wants her uncle to get married. Umar loved Sidra, played by Mahnoor Baloch, in his youth but both couldn't got married at that time. Fate brings them together after a hiatus of many years and that's how an old love story began.

== Cast ==
- Mahnoor Baloch as Sidra
- Aijaz Aslam as Umar
- Azfar Rehman as Sameer
- Sadaf Kanwal as Shanzey
- Shehnaz Pervaiz as Sameer's aunt
- Ayaz Samoo as Rehan
