= Judwaa (TV series) =

2025 Pakistani TV series

- جڑواں
- Genre: Drama; Family
- Written by: Fiza Jaffary; Orooj Binte Arsalan
- Directed by: Furqan Adam
- Starring: Aina Asif; Reham Rafiq; Sabreen Hisbani; Shahood Alvi; Zhalay Sarhadi; Nadia Hussain; Adnan Raza Mir; Syed Mohammad Ahmed
- Theme music composer: Syed Adeel
- Opening theme: "Yeh Ishq Bara Bedardi Hai" by Musavir Khan
- Country of origin: Pakistan
- Original language: Urdu
- No. of seasons: 1

Production
- Producers: Momina Duraid Productions; Babar Javed
- Production locations: Karachi, Pakistan
- Cinematography: Sheeraz Zafar
- Editor: Shahbaz Ali Baloch
- Camera setup: Multi-camera
- Running time: 36–38 minutes
- Production companies: BJ Productions; Momina Duraid Productions

Original release
- Network: Hum TV; Hum Network
- Release: 6 February – 23 May 2025

Judwaa (Urdu: جڑواں, lit. 'Twins') is a 2025 Pakistani television series directed by Furqan Adam and written by Fiza Jaffary and Orooj Binte Arsalan, It stars Aina Asif, Reham Rafiq, Sabreen Hisbani, Shahood Alvi, Zhalay Sarhadi, Nadia Hussain, Adnan Raza Mir and Syed Mohammad Ahmed rounding out the ensemble cast. The story revolves around a family torn apart by misunderstandings; it aired on Hum TV from 6 February 2025 to 23 May 2025.

== Premise ==
Judwaa is the story of twin girls who have identical faces but contrasting personalities. One is gentle and reserved, while the other is bold and fearless.

== Cast ==
- Aina Asif as Sara/Zara
- Sabreen Hisbani as Shazia
- Shahood Alvi as Mazhar
- Zhalay Sarhadi as Salma
- Nadia Hussain as Farhat
- Adnan Raza Mir as Adil
- Syed Mohammad Ahmed as Nana Miyan
- Ali Dayan as Sarmad
- Reham Rafiq as Rakshi

== Release and reception ==
The series premiered on 6 February 2025, on Hum TV. The show premiered daily at the prime time 9:00PM slot until 1 March 2025.

Gulf News called the series a must watch praising the story and actors.
