= Teri Meri Jodi =

- Genre: Rom-Com; Family drama
- Written by: Abeer Meher; Syed Mohammad Ahmed
- Directed by: Syed Ali Raza Usama
- Starring: Sami Khan; Shehnaz Pervaiz; Almas Fidai; Talha Jamshed Awan
- Country of origin: Pakistan
- Original languages: Urdu; Punjabi
- No. of episodes: 51

Production
- Producer: Babar Javed

Original release
- Network: Geo Entertainment
- Release: 22 December 2015 – 16 June 2016

Teri Meri Jodi is a Pakistani romantic comedy television series that aired on Geo Entertainment. The first episode aired on 22 December 2015.The series was produced by Babar Javed in collaboration with Zee TV Production. It follows the love story of a Gujrati girl, Jiya, and Punjabi man, Kabeer.

== Cast ==
- Sami Khan
- Almas Fidai
- Talha Jamshed Awan (tv actor)
- Adeel Wadia
- Maham Amir
- Ali Ansari
- Hina Khawaja Bayat
- Zaheen Tahira
- Parminder Gill
- Shazia Gohar
- Hiba Bukhari
- Shehnaz Pervaiz as Almas's mother
- Aftab Alam
- Ashraf Khan
- Nadia Kanwal
- Hira Hussain
- Farah Nadir
- Faisal Qazi
- Kaif Ghaznavi
- Sonia Rao
- Hamid Malik
- Iqra Shahid
- Usman Mazhar
- Shahzaib Khwaja
- Erum Bashir
- Fawad Khan
- Umar Sultan
- Abyan Chaudhry
- Husna Amaze
