= Aruba Mirza =

Pakistani actress

- Born: 12 September 1996 (age 30); Karachi, Sindh, Pakistan
- Education: University of Karachi
- Occupations: Actress; Model
- Years active: 2014–present
- Children: 1

Aruba Mirza is a Pakistani actress and model. She is known for her roles in the dramas Shahrukh Ki Saliyan, Kasak Rahay Ge, Babul Ka Angna, Rang Mahal, Inteqam and Meray Hi Rehna. She is the winner of Season 2 of the reality show Tamasha.

== Early life ==
Before she moved to Karachi, Aruba Mirza had appeared in a drama in Islamabad that wasn't aired on television. She met model Iqra on a flight to Islamabad and exchanged numbers with her. Later she showed her pictures to a director, and the director hired her for a role in the drama Behkay Kadam.

== Career ==
She debuted in Behkay Kadam in 2014. She was noted for her roles in the dramas Batashay, Kambakht Tanno, Babul Ka She debuted in Behkay Kadam in 2014. She was noted for her roles in dramas Batashay, Kambakht Tanno, Babul Ka Angna, Nazr-e-Bad, and Tere Bina. She modeled for designer brands. She appeared in dramas Kasak Rahay Ge, Naqqara-e-Khuda, Aye Dil Tue Bata, Shahrukh Ki Saliyan, and Mera Haq. Later she appeared in dramas My Modern Family, Sotan, Rang Mahal, Inteqam, and Meray Hi Rehna, Nazr-e-Bad and Tere Bina. She modeled for designer brands. She appeared in dramas Kasak Rahay Ge, Naqqara-e-Khuda, Aye Dil Tue Bata, Shahrukh Ki Saliyan and Mera Haq. Later she appeared in dramas My Modern Family, Sotan, Rang Mahal, Inteqam and Meray Hi Rehna.

== Personal life ==
Aruba was engaged to Haris Sulaiman but later they separated by mutual consent in 2024 and she has one daughter.

== Filmography ==
=== Television ===
Year	Title	Role	Network
2014	Behkay Kadam	Aliya	Express Entertainment
2015	Batashay	Shiza	ARY Digital
2016	Kambakht Tanno	Noreen	A-Plus
2016	Khuda Gawah	Sumaira	TV One
2016	Babul Ka Angna	Sehrish	Geo Entertainment
2017	Nazr-e-Bad	Abeera	Hum TV
2017	3 Khawa 3	Pretty girl	Aaj Entertainment
2017	Tere Bina	Abia	Geo Entertainment
2017	Mera Haq	Saba	Geo TV
2018	Kasak Rahay Ge	Wajia	TV One
2018	Kuch Is Tarah	Nirma	PTV
2018	Aye Dil Tu Bata	Tayyaba	Geo TV
2019	Shahrukh Ki Saliyan	Kitty	Geo Entertainment
2019	Dolly Darling	Nisha	Geo TV
2020	My Modern Family	Samina	Play Entertainment
2020	Sotan	Neelam	A-Plus
2021	Dikhawa Season 2	Naina	Geo Entertainment
2021	Makafaat Season 3	Amber	Geo Entertainment
2021	Rang Mahal	Hajra	Geo Entertainment
2022	Naqqara-e-Khuda	Bisma	TV One
2022	Inteqam	Uroosa	Geo Entertainment
2023	Bin Tere	Saira	Play Entertainment
2023	Woh Na Mila	Guriya	Play Entertainment
2023	Raaz	Arzoo	A-Plus
2023	Meray Hi Rehna	Anila	ARY Digital
2023	Tamasha Season 2	Herself / Winner	ARY Digital
2024	Suhana	Suhana	Aur Life
2024	BOL Kahani	Marjan	BOL Network

=== Telefilm ===
Year	Title	Role
2024	Apna Pan	Maha Khalid

== Awards and nominations ==
Year	Award	Category	Work	Result	Ref.
2023	Tamasha Season 2 Awards	Best Performer	Tamasha Season 2	Won	
