= Tanveer Fatima (B.A) =

2009 Pakistani television drama serial

- Genre: Family drama
- Written by: Syed Nabeel
- Directed by: Naved Jaffrey; Syed Nabeel
- Starring: Shabbir Jan; Rubina Ashraf; Shehnaz Pervaiz; Nadia Khan
- Country of origin: Pakistan
- Original language: Urdu
- No. of episodes: 307

Production
- Running time: Approx 40 Minutes

Original release
- Network: Geo TV
- Release: 2009

Tanveer Fatima (B.A) (Urdu: تنویر فاطمہ (بی اے)) is a 2009 Pakistani television drama serial that aired on Geo TV. The serial was produced by Hassan Zia and written by Syed Nabeel. The first 72 episodes were directed by Naved Jaffrey and the latter 244 episodes were directed by Syed Nabeel, totalling 316 episodes. Among the cast were Samina Ahmad, Nayyar Ejaz, Shabbir Jan, Humaima Malik, Shehnaz Pervaiz, Danish Nawaz and Yasir Nawaz.

== Cast ==
- Naheed Shabbir/Humaima Malik as Tanveer Fatima/ Tannu
- Samina Ahmad as Bano
- Nayyar Ejaz as Qadir
- Shabbir Jan as Nadir/Bhai Mian
- Danish Nawaz as Kaleem
- Yasir Nawaz
- Talat Hussain as Chunna Bhai: head of the society
- Rubina Ashraf as Aqeela
- Nazli Nasr as Tahira (Tannu's sister)
- Shehnaz Pervaiz as Guddu
- Ayesha Gul as Tanno
- Farah Ali as Munni
- Sarah Omair
- Darakshan Tahir
- Hina Shekih as Shazia
- Nayyar Ejaz as Qadir
- Nighat Sultana
- Afshan Qureshi as Nemo's mother
- Nadia Khan as Chuto
- Rubina Ashraf as Aqeela
- Isha Noor
- Kamran Jilani as Imran
- Humayun Ashraf as Zeeshan
- Faiq Khan
- Talat Hussain as Shuja Bhai; Head of the society
- Rubina Arif as Tannu's mother
- Akhtar Husnain as Naazim
