= Tamasha (TV series) =

Pakistani television reality show franchise

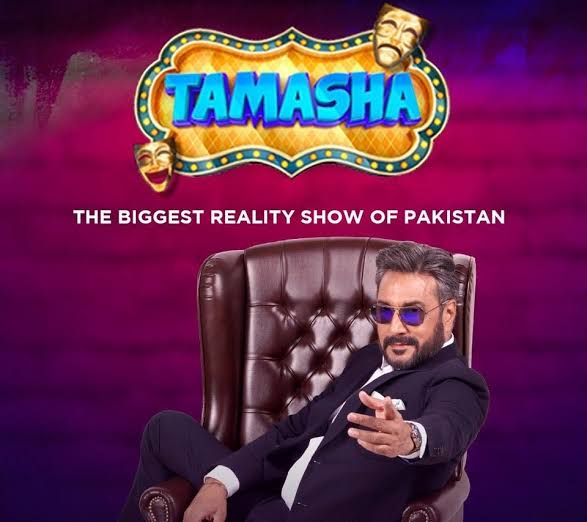
- Pakistan's first reality TV show
- Based on: Big Brother
- Presented by: Adnan Siddiqui
- Country of origin: Pakistan
- Original language: Urdu
- No. of seasons: 5
- No. of episodes: 280+

Production
- Production locations: Site Area, Karachi
- Running time: 90–91 minutes
- Production company: ARY Digital Network

Original release
- Network: ARY Digital; ARY Plus
- Release: 20 August 2022 – present

Tamasha (Urdu: تماشا, transl. "spectacle" or "drama"), also known as Tamasha Ghar, is a to Pakistani Urdu-language television reality show which airs during season run on ARY Digital and ARY Plus app in Pakistan. It adheres to the popular format of Big Brother, which was first developed by Endemol and Banijay in the Netherlands. The Pakistani version has celebrities as the housemates.

== Series details ==
Series	Host	House Location	Episodes	Originally released			Days	Housemates	Prize Money	Winner	Runner-up
Series	Host	House Location	Episodes	First released	Last released	Network	Days	Housemates	Prize Money	Winner	Runner-up
1	Adnan Siddiqui	Karachi	43	20 August 2022	1 October 2022	ARY Digital	42	13	Rs. 25 lakh (US$8,900)	Umer Aalam	Mareeha Safdar
2	Adnan Siddiqui	Karachi	50	5 August 2023	23 September 2023	ARY Digital	49	14	Rs. 25 lakh (US$8,900)	Aruba Mirza	Junaid Niazi
3	Adnan Siddiqui	Karachi	64	3 August 2024	5 October 2024	ARY Digital	64	18	Rs. 25 lakh (US$8,900)	Malik Aqeel	Arslan Khan
4	Adnan Siddiqui	Karachi	64	9 August 2025	11 October 2025	ARY Digital	65	18	Rs. 24 lakh (US$8,600)	Saif Ali Khan	Yaseen Ali
5	Adnan Siddiqui	Karachi	64	8 August 2026	10 October 2026	ARY Digital	66	18	Rs. 47 lakh (US$17,000)	Babrik Shah	Esra Ayesha

== Housemate pattern ==
Clique	S1	S2	S3	S4	S5			
Reality Show Alumni	Syed Saim Ali	Natasha Ali	Saima Baloch	Maham Mirza	Iman Lakhani			
Reality Show Alumni	Syed Saim Ali	Natasha Ali	Mahi Baloch	Daniya Kanwal	—			
Pageant Winner	Humaira Ali	None	None	Maham Mirza	—			
Item Girl	None	Natasha Ali	None	—	Laila			
Seasoned Model	Syed Saim Ali	Omer Shahzad	Ayaz Samoo	Ghaniya Siddiqi	Esra Ayesha			
Seasoned Model	Saeeda Imtiaz	Junaid Niazi	Abdullah Ejaz	Sarah Neelum	Fasih Khalid			
Seasoned Model	Mareeha Safdar	Aruba Mirza	Wajeha Khan	Maham Mirza	Maysam Hussain			
Seasoned Model	Mareeha Safdar	Aruba Mirza	Wajeha Khan	Maham Mirza	Zayb Khan			
TV Artist	Maira Khan	Natasha Ali	Dania Enwer	Sarah Omair	Ramsha Salahuddin			
TV Artist	Aamna Malick	Michelle Mumtaz	Malik Aqeel	Sarah Neelum	Sahrish Ahmed			
TV Artist	Umer Aalam	Omer Shahzad	Wajeha Khan	Muslim Abbas	Saqib Sumeer			
TV Artist	Syed Saim Ali	Nida Firdous	Anam Tanveer	Ahmer Hussain	Yasir Alam			
TV Artist	Syed Saim Ali	Junaid Niazi	Mahnoor Pervaiz	Zainabb Raja	Zayb Khan			
TV Artist	Syed Saim Ali	Junaid Niazi	Noman Habib	Yaseen Ali	—			
TV Artist	Syed Saim Ali	Junaid Niazi	Arslan Khan	Omi Butt	—			
Film Star	—	—	—	Omi Butt	Babrik Shah			
Film Star	Saeeda Imtiaz	Faizan Shaikh	Saima Baloch	Omi Butt	Laila			
Film Star	Faiza Khan	Faizan Shaikh	Anam Tanveer	Zainabb Raja	Saqib Sumeer			
Film Star	Mareeha Safdar	Faizan Shaikh	Noman Habib	Kashif Khan	—			
Theatre Artist	Rauf Lala	Faizan Shaikh	—	Ahmer Hussain	Saqib Sumeer			
Theatre Artist	Rauf Lala	Faizan Shaikh	—	Muslim Abbas	—			
Singer	Nouman Javaid	Adnan Hussain	Emaan Fatima	Quaid Ahmed	Hamza Joher			
Singer	Nouman Javaid	Adnan Hussain	Emaan Fatima	Daniya Kanwal	Jay Kadn			
Singer	Nouman Javaid	Adnan Hussain	Emaan Fatima	Saif Ali Khan	King Hassan			
Sportsperson	Sehr Baig	None	Sheharyar Shahid	Maddy	Esra Ayesha			
Comedian	Rauf Lala	Danish Maqsood	Mani Liaqat	Kashif Khan	—			
Dancer	Nigah Jee	None	None	Daniya Kanwal	Laila			
TV Presenter	Aadi Adeal Amjad	Amber Khan	Ayaz Samoo	—	—			
Fashion Designer	Syed Saim Ali	None	Zoyaa Khan	Rida Tariq	—			
Social media personality	None	Neha Khan	None	Ovais Riaz	Dr Zee	Samiya Hijab	Kanwal Farooq	Iman Lakhani
Social media personality	None	Neha Khan	None	Malaika Farooq	Rabia Javaid Sheikh			
Social media personality	None	Neha Khan	None	—	—	Ramsha Salahuddin		
Social media personality	None	Writer	None	Ali Sikander	—	—		
Non Celebrity	None	Rana Asif	None	Humna Naeem	Ghaniya Siddiqi	Fasih Khalid		
Non Celebrity	None	Rana Asif	Malaika Farooq	Humna Naeem	Kubra Eshaq			
Winner Runner-up Finalist	None							

== Tamasha season 1 ==
The participants in the order of appearance and entered in house are:

- Maira Khan – Television actress. She is known for portraying various roles in serials.
- Nigah Jee – Choreographer ( EVICTED: DAY 15)
- Mareeha Safdar – Model and actress.
- Syed Saim Ali – Television and film actor and presenter.
- Faiza Khan – Actress ( EVICTED: DAY 7)
- Nouman Javaid – Singer. He is known for his songs in the Hindi film Jashan.
- Aamna Malick – Television actress.
- Umer Aalam – Television actor and model.
- Humaira Ali – Model and actress.
- Saeeda Imtiaz – Actress. Known for her role in the Pakistani film Wajood.
- Sehr Beg – Fitness trainer.
- Aadi Adeal Amjad – Host and television presenter.
- Rauf Lala – Comedian.

=== Guest appearances ===
==== Through direct contact ====
Week(s)	Day(s)	Guest(s)	Notes
Week 1	Day 2	Waseem Badami	For motivating contestants
Week 2	Days 8-9	Ahmed Shah; Abubakr Shah; Umer Shah	For giving immunity to one contestant from "Khatray Ki Ghanti" (Nominations)
Week 2	Day 13	Muneeb Butt	For judging a task "Hasna Mana Hai"
Week 2	Day 14	Aijaz Aslam	For interaction with contestants
Week 3	Day 18	Junaid Khan	For interaction with contestants
Week 3	Day 20	Amar Khan	For interaction with contestants
Week 3	Day 21	Nabeel	For interaction with contestants
Week 4	Day 23	Momin Ali Munshi & Lubna Faryad	For doing fun activities with housemates
Week 4	Day 24	Zara Noor Abbas	For interaction with contestants
Week 5	Day 34	Humayun Saeed	To judge ticket to finale week task
Week 6	Day 37	Shoaib Malik	To promote "The Ultimate Muqabla"
Week 7	Day 40	Fahad Mustafa	To promote "Jeeto Pakistan"
Week 7	Day 41	Nida Yasir	To promote "Good Morning Pakistan"
Week 7	Day 41	Waseem Akram	To have fun segment with contestants

==== Through video link ====
Week(s)	Day(s)	Guest(s)	Notes
Week 3	Day 18	Faizan Shaikh	For motivating "Aadi"
Week 6	Day 36	Faizan Shaikh; Maham Amir; Parveen Akbar	For video call in family week for Aadi

=== Weekly summary ===
Week 1	Entrances	On Day 1, Maira, Nigah, Mareeha, Saim, Faiza, Nouman, Aamna, Umer, Humaira, Saeeda, Sehr, Aadi and Rauf entered the house as contestants.
Week 1	Wazir	On day 2, by random selection Maira was chosen as Wazir of the house by Badshah Salamat.
Week 1	Immunity Task	Token Walay Aur Rakhwalay On day 2, the 12 unsafe housemates were provided with 12 tokens each for the spending 24 hours. The basic necessities will be availed using the tokens; one time meal will be utilized using 2 tokens; Tea, fruits and egg can be consumed using one token; using washroom, make-up room and gym will also be available after using one token; 1 hour's sleep can be taken after using one token. The game will be supervised by Maira, with the support of other housemates. Wazir has the power to confiscate tokens in case she catches the housemates red handed, violating rules of the game. The housemate with the most tokens at the end of 24 hours will be immune from eviction.
Week 1	Immunity Task	Result – Mareeha won the immunity and saves herself from "Khatray Ka Ghar" as she had more tokens. Aaman and Rauf were nominated for eviction as they had least cards at the end of the task.
Week 1	Immunity Task	Aaqa Aur Ghulam On day 4, the contestants in Khatray Ka Ghar i.e.; Faiza, Umer, Nigah, Rauf and Aamna, were given an opportunity to get safe from getting evicted. They were servants of the already immune housemates for the task and listen to the orders of their owners. At the end of the task, the owners will decide the best servant who will be immuned from the Khatray Ka Ghar.
Week 1	Immunity Task	Result – Baadshah cancelled the task due to poor performance of the housemates
Week 1	Immunity Task	Yaaron Yehi Dosti Hai On day 6, the unsafe contestants have to choose a contestant who would play as their representative in the task. Aadi was chosen as the moderator of the task therefore no one can choose him as a representative.: Faiza chose Saeeda; Nigah chose Noman; Umer chose Sehr; Amna chose Saim and; Rauf chose Maira.; In the garden area, two phone booths were placed for male and female representatives. The chosen representatives have to stand in the booth till the end of the task. The person whose representative is the last-standing will be immune from the eviction.
Week 1	Immunity Task	Result – No one came out of the phone booth. Hence, no one was immune.
Week 1	Punishment	On day 4, Umer was nominated for the eviction directly as Saim called him out for using foul language in the task "Aaqa Aur Ghulam".; On day 5, Maira was dismissed as Wazir due to mismanagement and housemates were given the right to decide whether she will be able to continue her tenure as Wazir. Everyone except Aadi and Umer voted in her favor. Baadshah conducted a poll among the housemates to decide who should be the next Wazir between, Aadi and Umer. The majority choses Aadi as an interim Wazir.
Week 1	Exit	On day 7, Nigah was saved by the housemates' vote. Faiza Khan was evicted after facing public votes.
Week 2	Wazir	On day 8, the safe housemates (i.e, Aadi, Maira, Saeeda, Noman, Nigah, Rauf) were eligible for Wazarat. The housemates had to vote who they want to make Wazir for the week. By housemates, voting, Noman becomes the Wazir.
Week 2	Talk to the family Task	On day 9, in the gaming area all the males and females have to stand on a stepping podium with balancing a ball on the pole. The last standing male/female will get a chance to talk to their family.
Week 2	Talk to the family Task	Result – Nigah from males and Mareeha from females won the task
Week 2	Immunity Task	Tamasha Bank On day 10, the garden was designed with two printing stations, and one bank was designed in the gaming area. Noman had to choose a housemate who will play the role of Banker, he chose Aadi. In each round both the teams have to prepare currency notes and deposit them in the bank. Each team have to deposit notes to the banker. Bankers have the right to reject the currency offered by the depositors. The approved notes will be handed over to Wazir for keeping in respective team's safe. After the end of the rounds, the team with the most approved currency notes in their safe will be declared winner of the task. The winning team will end up being nominated for eviction. The teams were as follows: Team A – Khatray Ki Ghanti team – Humaira, Mareeha, Saim, Aamna and Sehr; Team B – Safe zone team – Maira, Saeeda, Rauf, Umer and Nigah
Week 2	Immunity Task	Result – Team A had 184 approved notes where Team B had 158 approved notes. Therefore, Team A won and got immuned from nominations and Team B was nominated.
Week 2	Immunity Task	On day 12, the housemates were divided into pairs as; Saeeda and Sehr; Mareeha and Rauf; Humaira and Aadi; Umer and Maira; Nigah and Noman; Saim and Amna. In the gaming area, each individual from the pair has to build a tower using blocks, whereas his partner has to throw balls to destroy other pairs towers. The team with highest tower will win the task. The winning pair will be rewarded with the one housemate with immunity and another with the opportunity to talk to the family.
Week 2	Immunity Task	Result – Mareeha and Rauf won the task. Rauf got immune from "Khatray Ka Ghar" and Mareeha gave her power to talk to the family to Rauf as well.
Week 2	Luxury Dinner Task	Hasna Mana Hai On day 13, the housemates were divided into two teams as; Team A: Umer, Rauf, Saeeda, Maira, Saim and Aamna; Team B: Aadi, Mareeha, Noman, Nigah, Sehr and Humaira. Team A had to make members of Team B laugh. If all the members of Team B laugh during the task, team A will win the task or vice versa.
Week 2	Luxury Dinner Task	Result – Team B won.
Week 2	Ration Task	Tawazan Barkarar Rakhiye On day 14, the housemates have to balance the see-saw for the specified time whereas Lala or Aadi will sit on the on one side of the ride whereas two housemates at once can use their force to balance the see-saw and not let the Lala or Aadi touch the ground.
Week 2	Exit	On day 15, Nigah was evicted after facing public votes.
Week 3	Wazir	On day 15, Badshah chose Umer as the Wazir of the house.
Week 3	Immunity Tasks	
Week 3	Immunity Tasks	Saanp Seerhi (Snake and Ladder) On day 18, like a board game, unsafe housemates have to roll a dice and navigate the board. Landing on the ladder advances a player to a square further up the board while landing on a snake means they have to go back to the previous square, where snake's tail is connected. The player to reach the final square wins the game.

=== Nomination table ===
	Week 1		Week 2			Week 3	Week 4	Week 5	Week 6		
	Day 2	Day 7	Day 8	Day 8	Day 12	Week 3	Week 4	Week 5	Day 40	Day 43	
Wazir	Maira	Aadi	No Wazir		Noman	Umer	Humaira; Mareeha	Rauf	No; Wazir		
Wazir's Nominations	Mareeha; Faiza	Not eligible							No; Wazir		
Vote to:	Eliminate	Save	Eliminate	Wazir	Save						
Contender for	All Housemates	Faiza Umer Nigah Aamna Rauf	All Housemates	Maira Noman Aadi Saeeda Nigah Rauf	Maira Umer Saeeda Nigah Rauf						
Umer	Aadi	Nominated	Humaira	Noman	Nominated	Wazir	Nominated	Eliminated (Day 28)	Nominated	No; Nominations	Winner (Day 43)
Mareeha	Umer	Aamna	Saim	Noman	Umer	Nominated	Wazir	Nominated	Nominated	No; Nominations	1st runner-up (Day 43)
Aadi	Rauf	Umer	Aamna	Noman	Umer	Nominated	Nominated	Nominated	Nominated	No; Nominations	2nd runner-up (Day 43)
Rauf	Aadi	Nominated	Mareeha	Noman	Nominated	Nominated	Nominated	Nominated	Nominated	No; Nominations	3rd runner-up (Day 43)
Maira	Wazir	Nigah	Humaira	Noman	Nominated	Nominated	Nominated	Nominated	Nominated	Ejected (Day 40)	
Humaira	Aamna	Nigah	Aamna	Noman	Rauf	Nominated	Wazir	Eliminated (Day 28)	Nominated	Ejected (Day 40)	
Saim	Nigah	Nigah	Aamna	Noman	Rauf	Nominated	Nominated	Nominated	Eliminated (Day 35)		
Saeeda	Nigah	Faiza	Sehr	Noman	Nominated	Nominated	Nominated	Nominated	Eliminated (Day 35)	Guest	Eliminated (Day 35)
Noman	Umer	Nigah	Saim	Aadi	Maira	Safe	Nominated	Eliminated (Day 28)			
Aamna	Nigah	Nominated	Saim	Noman	Umer	Nominated	Eliminated (Day 21)				
Sehr	Umer	Rauf	Humaira	Maira	Maira	Nominated	Eliminated (Day 21)				
Nigah	Umer	Nominated	Mareeha	Noman	Nominated	Eliminated (Day 15)					
Faiza	Rauf	Nominated	Eliminated (Day 7)								
Notes	1	none		3	4,5,6	7, 8,9,10	11,12,13,14	15,16	17	none	
Result of voting	Faiza; ~~Mareeha~~; Umer; Nigah; Aamna; Rauf	Nigah	Umer; Aamna; Saim; Mareeha; Humaira; Sehr	Noman	Umer	Aadi; Aamna; Humaira; ~~Maira~~; Mareeha; ~~Rauf~~; ~~Saeeda~~; ~~Saim~~; Sehr	Aadi; Humaira; Maira; ~~Mareeha~~; Noman; Rauf; Saeeda; Saim; Umer	~~Aadi~~; Humaira; ~~Maira~~; ~~Mareeha~~; Rauf; Saeeda; Saim; Umer	Aadi; Humaira; Maira; Mareeha; Rauf; Umer	Aadi; Mareeha; Rauf; Umer	
Ejected	None								Humaira	None	
Ejected	None								Maira	None	
Re-entered	None						Humaira	Umer	None		
Khatray Ka Ghar	Faiza; Umer; Nigah; Aamna; Rauf	Faiza; Umer; Aamna; Rauf	Umer; Aamna; Saim; Mareeha; Humaira; Sehr	~~Umer~~; Aamna; Saim; Mareeha; Humaira; Sehr	~~Aamna~~; ~~Saim~~; ~~Mareeha~~; ~~Humaira~~; ~~Sehr~~ ~~Umer~~ ~~Rauf~~ Maira Saeeda Nigah						
Eliminated	None	Faiza	None		Nigah	Sehr	Umer	Saeeda	No; Eviction	Rauf	Aadi
Eliminated	None	Faiza	None		Nigah	Sehr	Humaira	Saeeda	No; Eviction	Mareeha	Umer
Eliminated	None	Faiza	None		Nigah	Aamna	Noman	Saim	No; Eviction	Mareeha	Umer

- ^1: Mareeha was saved, where as Rauf and Amna were nominated as a result of "Token Walay Aur Rakhwalay".
- ^2: Umer was nominated by "Adnan Siddiqui" for violating house rules.
- ^3: On day 9, Umer was saved by guests; Ahmed Shah, Abubakr Shah and Umer Shah.
- ^4: Umer, Rauf, Maira, Saeeda and Nigah lost the task "Tamasha Bank" against nominated contestants; Mareeha, Humaira, Aamna, Saim and Sehr were saved and as a result they were nominated.
- ^5: On day 12, Rauf won the immunity by winning the task.
- ^7: Everyone was nominated for eviction by "Adnan Siddiqui" except Noman by virtue of being Wazir of last week.
- ^8: Saim and Maira were saved as they won "Train Task".
- ^9: Saeeda got saved by winning the "Saanp Seerhi" task.
- ^10: Rauf got saved by winning the task.
- ^11: Due to violations in the puzzle task, all housemates were nominated by Adnan Siddiqui including Wazir Humaira.
- ^12: Mareeha saved herself by winning the task and became the Wazir.
- ^13: Saeeda saved herself by winning the task "Grabstick".
- ^14: Saim, Umer and Aadi got saved by winning tasks but Umer nominated himself and saved Rauf.
- ^15: Umer, Humaira and Noman evicted on Day 28. However, Humaira entered the house later the same day, where as Umer came back on Day 29.
- ^16: Aadi, Mareeha and Maira won ticket to finale week task and entered the final week.
- ^17: Humaira and Maira ejected from the house after physically assaulted.
- ^18 : On Day 35, elimination occurred. Saeeda and Saim get evicted while Umer and Rauf Lala become the last two finalists.
- ^19 : On Day 40 – out of the 6 finalists, Humaira and Maira get evicted due to violating the rules of physical violence. Saeeda re-enters as a guest to stay until the finale.
- ^20: Finale occurs on Day 43. The winner is decided by the votes of audience. Umer Aalam becomes the winner of Tamasha Season 1 while Mareeha Safdar becomes the Runner-up. Aadi Adeel Amjad becomes the second runner up while Rauf Lala becomes the third runner up.

== Tamasha season 2 ==
The second season premiered on 5 August 2023, hosted by actor Adnan Siddiqui. The grand finale took place on 24 September 2023, where Aruba Mirza emerged as the winner and Junaid Niazi became the runner-up.

Contestants

- Aruba Mirza (Winner)
- Junaid Niazi (Runner-up)
- Omer Shahzad
- Faizan Sheikh
- Neha Khan
- Ali Sikander
- Danish Maqsood
- Natasha Ali
- Michelle Mumtaz
- Rana Asif
- Amber Khan
- Adnan Hussain
- Zainab Raja
- Nida Firdous

== Tamasha season 3 ==
Contestants

- Abdullah Eijaz – model
- Agha Talal – Actor
- Arslan Khan – Actor
- Anam Tanver – Actress
- Ayaz Samoo – Actor and tv host
- Dania Enwar – Actress
- Emaan Fatima – Singer
- Humna Naeem – Content creator
- Junaid Akhter – Actor
- Mahi Baloch – Actress
- Mahnoor Pervaiz – Actress
- Malik Akeel – Actor
- Noman Habib – Actor
- Saima Baloch – Actress
- Sherharyar Shahid – Gym instructor/content creator
- Wajeeha Khan – Model/actress
- Zoya Khan – Model/actress

== Tamasha season 4 ==
Season 4 premiered on 9 August 2025.

The contestants are;

- Saif Ali Khan – Singer, Songwriter, Musician (Winner)
- Yaseen Ali – Actor (Runner-up)
- Sarah Neelum – Model and actress (2nd runner-up)
- Malaika Farooq – Influencer and business owner (4th place)
- Muslim Abbas – Actor and podcaster (5th place)
- Maham Mirza – Model and reality tv star. Competed in Super Diva. Eliminated Day 62
- Kanwal Farooq – Influencer and fashion designer. Eliminated Day 61
- Zainabb Raja – Actress. Eliminated Day 57
- Omi Butt – Actor, chef and entertainer. Eliminated Day 57
- Maddy – Fitness trainer. Eliminated Day 50
- Daniya Kanwal – Musician, dancer and actress. Participated in Champions Season 1. Eliminated Day 50
- Rida Tariq – Fashion Designer Eliminated Day 43
- Ahmer Hussain – Actor. Walked Day 21. Re-entered Day 25. Eliminated Day 43
- Sarah Omair – Television actress. Eliminated Day 36
- Kashif Khan – Actor and Comedian. Winner of Comedy Circus season 1. Eliminated Day 29
- Ovais Riaz- Social media content creator. Eliminated Day 23
- Ghaniya Siddiqi – Model, Host and makeup artist. Eliminated Day 15
- Quaid Ahmed – Singer. Eliminated Day 8

=== Housemates status ===
SL	Housemates	Day entered	Day exited	Status
1	Saif	Day 1	Day 64	Winner
2	Yaseen	Day 1	Day 64	1st Runner-up
3	Sarah N	Day 1	Day 64	2nd Runner-up
4	Malaika	Day 1	Day 64	3rd runner-up
5	Muslim	Day 1	Day 64	4th runner-up
6	Maham	Day 1	Day 62	Eliminated
7	Kanwal	Day 1	Day 61	Evicted
8	Zainabb	Day 1	Day 22	Evicted by Housemates
8	Zainabb	Day 23	Day 56	Evicted
9	Omi	Day 1	Day 56	Evicted
10	Maddy	Day 1	Day 49	Evicted
11	Daniya	Day 1	Day 49	Evicted
12	Rida	Day 1	Day 42	Evicted
13	Ahmer	Day 1	Day 21	Walked
13	Ahmer	Day 25	Day 42	Evicted
14	Sarah O	Day 1	Day 35	Evicted
15	Kashif	Day 1	Day 28	Evicted
16	Ovais	Day 1	Day 22	Evicted
17	Ghaniya	Day 1	Day 14	Evicted
18	Quaid	Day 1	Day 7	Evicted

=== Nominations table ===
TS4	Week 1		Week 2	Week 3	Week 4		Week 5	Week 6	Week 7	Week 8	Week 9	Week 10	Finale
Nominees Wazir	All Housemates		Daniya; Muslim; Rida	Ahmer; Daniya; Maddy; Malaika; Muslim; Ovais; Sarah O Zainabb	Daniya; Kanwal; Kashif; Maddy; Malaika; Muslim; Omi; Rida; Saif; Yaseen		Daniya; Muslim; Omi; Saif	Ahmer Daniya; Kanwal; Maham; Maddy; Malaika; Muslim; Omi Rida; Saif; Yaseen	Daniya; Kanwal; Maham; Maddy; Malaika; Muslim; Omi; Saif; Yaseen	Kanwal; Maham; Malaika; Muslim; Omi; Saif; Yaseen Zainab	Wazarat Abolished		
Wazir	~~Sarah O~~ Saif		Daniya	Maddy	Sarah N		Muslim	Yaseen	Muslim	Saif	Kanwal (2 hrs) Malaika (2 hrs) Maham (2 hrs)	Wazarat Abolished	
Musheer	~~Kashif~~ Yaseen		Ahmer	Malaika	Saif		Daniya	Saif	Omi	Yaseen	Musheer Abolished		
Vote to:		Eliminate			Eliminate								
Saif	Wazir	Ghaniya	Safe	Safe	Zainabb	Safe		Nominated		Wazir		Finalist	Winner
Yaseen	Safe	Kashif	Nominated		Muslim		Safe	Wazir	Nominated	Safe		Finalist	Runner Up
Sarah N		Zainabb	Safe		Zainabb	Wazir	Nominated	Nominated				Finalist	2nd Runner Up
Malaika	Safe	Quaid	Safe		Zainabb			Nominated	Safe			Finalist	3rd Runner Up
Muslim	Safe	Kashif	Safe	Safe	Saif		Wazir	Nominated	Wazir	Safe		Finalist	4th Runner Up
Maham		Kashif			Kashif	Safe		Nominated		Nominated		Eliminated (Day 62)	
Kanwal		Zainabb	Nominated	Safe	Zainabb		Safe	Nominated		Safe		Eliminated (Day 61)	
Omi		Quaid		Safe	Zainabb		Safe	Nominated	Safe		Eliminated (Day 57)		
Zainabb	Safe	Sarah O			Omi		Safe	Nominated			Eliminated (Day 57)		
Maddy		Quaid	Safe	Wazir	Saif	Nominated	Safe	Nominated		Eliminated (Day 50)			
Daniya	Safe	Kashif	Wazir	Safe	Zainabb	Safe		Nominated		Eliminated (Day 50)			
Rida		Kashif		Safe	Zainabb	Safe		Nominated	Eliminated (Day 43)				
Ahmer		Zainabb	Safe		Walked (Day 21)	Safe	Safe	Nominated	Eliminated (Day 43)				
Sarah O	~~Wazir~~	Omi	Safe	Safe	Kashif	Safe		Eliminated (Day 36)					
Kashif	Safe	Kanwal	Nominated		Daniya		Eliminated (Day 29)						
Ovais	Safe	Omi	Nominated		Eliminated (Day 22)								
Ghaniya		Kashif	Nominated	Eliminated (Day 15)									
Quaid		Sarah O	Eliminated (Day 8)										
Notes													
Khatray ka ghar	Ahmer; Ghaniya; Kanwal; Maddy; Maham; Omi; Quaid; Rida; Sarah N Sarah O		Ghaniya; Kashif; Kanwal; Maham; Omi; Ovais; Rida; Yaseen; Zainab	~~Ahmer~~; Kashif; Maham; Malaika; Omi; Ovais; Saif; Sarah N Yaseen; Zainabb	Kanwal; Kashif; Maddy; Malaika; Muslim; Omi; Yaseen; Zainabb		Daniya; Maham; Malaika; Rida; Saif; Sarah N Sarah O	Ahmer; Daniya; Kanwal; Maddy; Maham; Malaika; Muslim; Omi; Rida; Saif; Sarah N Yaseen; Zainabb	Daniya; Kanwal; Maddy; Maham; Saif; Sarah N Yaseen; Zainabb	Maham; Malaika; Omi; Sarah N Zainabb	Kanwal; Maham; Malaika; Muslim; Saif; Yaseen	Ghar Abolished	
Secret Room				Zainabb									
Re-entered	None				Zainabb Ahmer	None							
Walked				Ahmer									
Eliminated	Quaid		Ghaniya	Ovais	Kashif		Sarah O	Ahmer Rida	Maddy Daniya	Omi Zainabb	Kanwal Maham		

=== Notes ===
indicates the Wazir.
indicates the Nominees for house Wazir.
indicates that the Housemate was directly nominated for eviction prior to the regular nominations process.
indicates ticket to finale.
indicates the winner.
indicates the first runner up.
indicates the second runner up.
indicates the third runner up.
indicates the fourth runner up.
indicates the contestant has re-entered the house.
indicates that the Housemate was in the Secret Room.
indicates the contestant has been walked out of the show.
indicates the contestant has been eliminated.

== Tamasha season 5 ==
Tamasha 5 premiered on 8 August 2026.

The following housemates entered the house in order;

- Filmstar Laila – Film actress
- Saqib Sumeer – Theatre, Film and TV actor
- Samiya Hijab – Social media content creator
- Yasir Alam – Actor
- Sahrish Ahmed – Actress
- Fasih Khalid – Fashion Model
- Esra Ayesha – Cricketer and Model (2nd Runner-up)
- Babrik Shah – Film actor (Winner)
- Maysam Hussain – Fashion Model
- Zayb Khan – Actor and Model
- Iman Lakhani – Content creator and Make up artist
- Dr Zee Khan – Doctor and Content Creator
- Rabia Javed Sheikh – Content creator and marketing professional
- Jay Kadn – Singer, Songwriter and Composer
- Ramsha Salahuddin – Actress and content creator
- Hamza Joher – Singer
- Kubra Eshaq – Model
- King Hassan – Rapper

Guest appearances;

- Meera – Lollywood Actress
- Ali Abdullah Durrani – Comedian
- Hassan Choudary – Entertainment Journalist, Critic, and Digital Host
- Aadi Adeal Amjad – Host and television presenter
- Nida Yasir – Host and television presenter
- Saif Ali Khan – Singer, Songwriter, Musician
- Aijaz Aslam – Television Actor and Model
- Hareem Farooq – Television Theatre, film producer, and singer

=== Housemates status ===
SL	Housemates	Day entered	Day exited	Status
1	Babrik Shah	Day 1	Day 66	Winner
2	Esra Ayesha	Day 1	Day 66	1st Runner-up
3	Fasih Khalid	Day 1	Day 66	2nd Runner-up
4	Dr. Zee	Day 1	Day 66	3rd Runner-up
5	Samiya Hijab	Day 1	Day 66	4th Runner-up
6	Yasir Alam	Day 1	Day 66	5th Runner-up
7	Laila	Day 1	Day 63	Evicted (final week)
8	King Hassan	Day 1	Day 61	Evicted (final week)
9	Rabia	Day 1	Day 57	Evicted
10	Sahrish	Day 1	Day 55	Evicted
11	Zayb	Day 1	Day 50	Evicted
12	Hamza	Day 1	Day 47	Evicted
13	Ramsha	Day 1	Day 36	Evicted
14	Saqib	Day 1	Day 29	Evicted
15	Maysum	Day 1	Day 22	Evicted
16	Kubra	Da y 1	Day 15	Evicted
17	Jay	Day 1	Day 12	Evicted
18	Iman	Day 1	Day 8	Evicted

=== Voting History ===
Tamasha Season 5 voting history
	Week 1	Week 2		Week 3	Week 4	Week 5	Week 6	Week 7		Week 8	Week 9	Week 10	Finale				
	Week 1	Week 2		Week 3	Week 4	Week 5	Week 6	Week 7		Week 8	Week 9	Week 10	Finale	Day 12	Day 15	Day 48	Day 50
Wazir candidates	None	All Housemates		All Housemates	Rabia; Zayb	Dr Zee; Fasih; King Hassan; Laila; Ramsha; Samiya	Babrik; Dr Zee; Hassan; Hamza; Rabia; Sahrish; Samiya; Yasir	All Housemates		All Housemates	None						
Wazir	None	Laila		Esra	Zayb	~~Fasih~~; Dr Zee	Hamza	Rabia		Yasir	None						
Musheer	None	Dr Zee		Saqib	Samiya	Rabia	Samiya	King Hassan		Laila	None						
Babrik	Safe	Safe		Safe	Safe	Safe				Safe							
Dr Zee				Safe		Wazir	Safe										
Esra	Safe			Wazir	Safe	Safe											
Fasih	Safe		Safe		Safe	Wazir	Safe										
Samiya	Safe				Safe	Nominated	Safe										
Yasir	Safe		Safe				Safe			Wazir							
Laila		Wazir		Nominated		Eliminated (Day 67)							Safe				
King Hassan	Safe			Safe	Safe	Safe	Safe	Safe		Safe	Eliminated (Day 61)						
Rabia					Safe	Safe	Eliminated (Day 59)										
Sahrish	Safe				Safe		Nominated		Safe	Eliminated (Day 55)							
Zayb	Safe	Safe		Safe	Wazir	Nominated	Safe	Eliminated (Day 50)									
Hamza	Safe			Safe			Wazir	Nominated		Eliminated (Day 48)							
Ramsha					Safe		Eliminated (Day 36)										
Saqib	Safe	Safe		Safe		Eliminated (Day 29)											
Maysam	Safe			Nominated	Eliminated (Day 22)												
Kubra	Safe			Eliminated (Day 15)													
Jay	Safe		Eliminated (Day 12)														
Iman		Eliminated (Day 8)															
Khatray ka ghar	Dr Zee; Iman; Laila; Rabia; Ramsha; Zayb	Dr Zee; Esra; Fasih; Hamza; Jay; King Hassan; Kubra; Maysam; Rabia; Ramsha; Samiya; Sahrish; Yasir	Dr Zee; Esra; Hamza; King Hassan; Kubra; Maysam; Rabia; Ramsha; Samiya; Sahrish	Fasih; Laila; Maysam; Rabia; Ramsha; Samiya; Sahrish; Yasir	Dr Zee; Hamza; Laila; Samiya; Saqib; Yasir	Hamza; Laila; Ramsha; Sahrish; Yasir; Zayb	Babrik; Esra; Laila; Rabia; Sahrish; Samiya	Babrik; Esra; Fasih; Hamza; Laila; Sahrish; Yasir; Zayb	Babrik; Esra; Fasih; Yasir; Zayb	Fasih; Dr Zee; Esra	Yasir; Samiya; Fasih; Babrik; Laila; Dr Zee; Esra	Babrik; Dr Zee; Esra; Fasih; King Hassan; Laila; Samiya; Yasir	Babrik; Dr Zee; Esra; Fasih; Samiya; Yasir; Laila				
Secret Room						Dr Zee											
Re-entered	None					Dr Zee											
Walked																	
Evicted	Iman	Jay	Kubra	Maysam	Saqib	Ramsha	No Eviction	Hamza	Zayb	Sahrish	Rabia	King Hassan	Laila				

Notes
indicates the Wazir.
indicates the Nominees for house Wazir.
indicates that the Housemate was directly nominated for eviction prior to the regular nominations process.
indicates ticket to finale.
indicates the winner.
indicates the first runner up.
indicates the second runner up.
indicates the third runner up.
indicates the fourth runner up.
indicates the contestant has re-entered the house.
indicates that the Housemate was in the Secret Room.
indicates the contestant has been walked out of the show.
indicates the contestant has been eliminated.
