= Mera Haq =

Pakistani television series

- Genre: Family drama
- Created by: Faysal Manzoor Khan
- Written by: Muhammad Asif
- Directed by: Fahad Rehmani
- Starring: Madiha Iftikhar; Aruba Mirza; Bilal Qureshi
- Country of origin: Pakistan
- Original language: Urdu
- No. of episodes: 60

Production
- Producer: Erum Binte Shahid
- Production location: Pakistan
- Running time: Approx 40 Minutes; From 20 June approx 20 Minutes

Original release
- Network: Geo TV
- Release: 25 December 2017 – 17 July 2018

Mera Haq (Urdu: میرا حق, lit. 'My Right') is a 2017 Pakistani drama serial directed by Fahad Rehmani, produced by Erum Binte Shahid and written by Muhammad Asif. The drama stars Madiha Iftikhar, Aruba Mirza and Bilal Qureshi in lead roles, and was first aired on 25 December 2017 on Geo Entertainment. The story revolves around a sister's rivalry and greed . It was a come-back serial of Madiha Iftikhar after the serial Ishq Ki Inteha.

== Cast ==
=== Main lead ===
- Madiha Iftikhar As Sara
- Bilal Qureshi As Ali
- Aruba Mirza As Saba
- Shamil Khan As Umair
- Zhalay Sarhadi

=== Supporting characters ===
- Shaista Jabeen As Salma
- Anwar Iqbal As Zaheer
- Zaheen Tahira As Sajeela (Dadi)
- Fauzia Mushtaq As Maryam
- Marium Shafi As Samina
- Zahida Batool
- Rafia Nasir
- Rose Muhammad
- Maira Baloch
- Raja Feroz
- Syed Nabeel
- Babar Khan (Child Star)

=== Special appearance ===
- Fareeha Jabeen
- Qurat ul Ain
- Fahad Rehmani

== Production ==
The drama is produced by Erum Binte Shahid from Production house Dramaybaaz Productions which produce hit serial Silsilay. It is the first drama serial produced by Dramaybaaz Productions.

== Released ==
The serial was first aired on 25 December 2017.
