= Quaid Ahmed =

Pakistani singer-songwriter

Quaid Ahmed قائد احمد
- Born: Karachi, Sindh, Pakistan
- Genres: Pop Rock; EDM; Folk; Semi Classical; Sufi
- Occupations: Singer-songwriter, Producer, Actor
- Instrument: Vocals
- Years active: 2013–present
- Label: Laal Series
- Formerly of: Sounds of Kolachi Umair Jaswal, Ali Azmat, Shahi Hassan, Natasha Baig, Fawad Khan, Atif Aslam

Quaid Ahmed (Urdu: قائد احمد), also spelled Qua-id Ahmed, is a Pakistani singer-songwriter from Karachi. He sings in various genres including Sufi rock.

== Early life ==
Ahmed started out on Pakistani television before becoming a fulltime musician.

== Career ==
After releasing the albums Elhaam and Sunlo', Ahmed released Nirali, his third overall and second solo album with an EDM artist/producer Zaphixx 2022. Quaid has worked in collaboration with artists from several countries. He toured the US and Europe in 2017, 2018 and 2019.

He was associated with the Pakistani band Sounds Of Kolachi as a founder and lead vocalist (2013-2021).

He was one of the 140 voices that sang and recorded “The Official National Anthem” of Pakistan, produced by Rohail Hyatt and Arshad Mehmud.

Sounds Of Kolachi's debut album was Elhaam."SOK" was a commercial success.

He works with Geo TV, singing and writing satirical music pieces for the show Hasna Mana Hai with Tabish Hashmi, as a producer, composer, writer and curator. He worked with Atif Aslam, Fawad Khan, EP, Zulfi, Meesha Shafi, Natasha Baig, Zeb Bangash, Sounds Of Kolachi, and Mekaal Hasan.

In 2025 he participated in the reality show Tamasha but was evicted after just one week.

== Discography ==
=== Singles ===
- "Allah Hi Dega" - Sounds Of Kolachi - 2017
- "Theher Jaa" - 2019 - Laal Series

=== Sunlo ===
- "Shamein" - 2019
- "Sunlo" - 2020
- "Jugnu" - 2020
- "Kaun Hai" - 2020
- "PariNama" - 2020

=== Nirali (Quaid Ahmed x Zaphixx) ===
- "Jani Janay" - 2022
- "Teri Yaad" - 2022
- "Paas Hongay" - 2022
- "Kaun Hai 2.0" - 2022
- "Sadaa" - 2022
- "Kaa Karun" - 2022
- "Tum Chahiye Ho" - 2022
- "Nirali Raat" - 2022

=== Composer ===
- "Kaise Kahoon" - Natasha Baig (2020)
- "Saiyyan" - Natasha Baig (2021)
- "Chalta Rahoon" - Teen Talwar (2020)
