= Syed Nabeel =

Pakistani actor/director

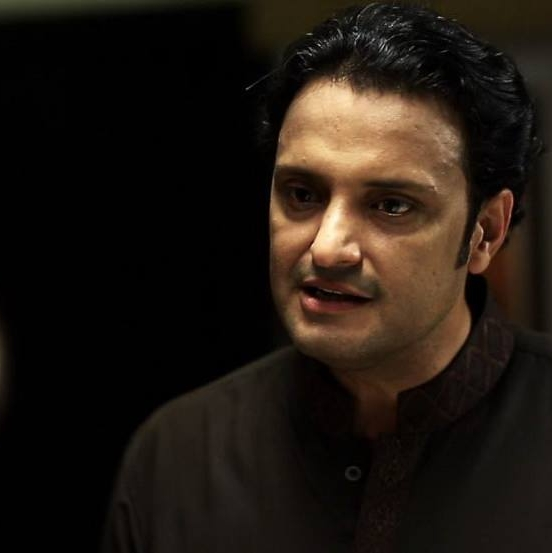
- Born: Karachi, Sindh, Pakistan
- Occupations: Playwright; director; actor
- Years active: 1993–present

Syed Nabeel (Urdu: سيد نبيل) is a Pakistani writer. His notable television plays include Half Set, Aap Ko Kia Takleef Hai, Main Aur Tum, Rookhey Naina, Tanveer Fatima BA, Chemistry, Shaadi Ka Laddu, Dil Nawaz.

== Career ==
Born and raised in Karachi, Nabeel graduated from Punjab University with a bachelor's degree in Commerce and obtained a Masters in Business Administration from Quaid-e-Azam University.

From 1996 to 2000 Nabeel was affiliated with Saanjh Theatre Group Islamabad as an actor. He performed internationally, participating in the Cairo International Festival for Experimental Theatre in 1997. He acted in several issue-based plays for UNDP and UNFPA, raising awareness on child sexual abuse and women empowerment. During this period he also wrote and directed several documentaries for International Development Partners, a Norway-based international non-governmental organisation, on inclusive education for children with special needs in Pakistan.

His first television appearance as actor was in 1993 and from 2003 he began to act and write for popular television channels, including PTV and NTM. He began directing in 2001 with Aap Ko Kya Takleef Hai with PTV, for which a season two is in production with Bol Entertainment. He wrote numerous independent plays and sitcoms thereafter.

He joined Indus TV in 2003, writing plays such as Hanste Baste and also Naak Main Dum with Samina Ahmed as director. In 2004 and 2005, he conducted several live shows for night-time transmissions with PTV as anchorperson. He joined Bol Entertainment in 2015 as writer-director. Among his most popular plays has been Dilnawaz, which was aired in 2017 by APlus Entertainment. A second season is under production for Dilnawaz and is planned to air in early 2019.

== Filmography ==
Year	Show	Channel	Notes	Role
1993	Dua	NTM	Actor	Cameo as hero's friend
2003	Naak Mein Dum (sitcom)	Indus TV	Writer	
2003	Half Set	Prime Entertainment	Writer/actor	Zahid
2003	Aap Ko Kia Takleef Hai	PTV Home	Actor/writer/director	Saleem the ward boy
2003-2005	Hanste Baste (sitcom)	Indus TV	Writer	
2004	Maal Na Maan (sitcom)	Indus TV	Writer	
2004	Main Aur Tum	ARY Digital	Writer	
2004	Jaein Kahan Armaan	ARY Digital	Writer	
2005	Love Marriage	Hum TV	Actor/writer	
2005	Mere Paas Paas	Hum TV	Actor	2nd lead
2005	Khudkalami (telefilm)	Hum TV	Actor/writer/director	Saleem
2006	Rookhey Naina	Geo Entertainment	Actor/writer	Person with Autism Spectrum Disorder
2006	Junoon	Geo Entertainment	Director	
2007	Chehray	PTV Home	PTV Home	Director
2008-2011	Tanveer Fatima BA	Geo Entertainment	Actor/writer/director	Master Saab
2009	Chemistry	Geo Entertainment	Writer/actor	Cameo as agent
2009	Dekha Hai Pehli Baar (telefilm)	Aaj TV	Writer/director	
2012-2014	Shaadi Ka Laddu	Express Entertainment	Writer/director	
2013	Aye Hye Kambakht	ATV	Director	
2013-2014	Dulha Bhai (sitcom)	Express Entertainment	Director	
2014	Mohabbat Zindabad (sitcom)	Express Entertainment	Director	
2014	Kaun Hein Hum	Play TV	Writer/director	
2015	Nazu	Urdu 1	Actor	Cameo
2016	Rishta Anjana Sa	ARY Digital	Actor	Khadim Hussain
2017	Dil Nawaz	APlus Entertainment	Writer	
2017	Mera Haq	Geo Entertainment	Actor	Ajmal
2018	Aap Ko Kia Takleef Hai (Season 2, upcoming)	Bol Entertainment	Writer/director	
2018	Dilnawaz 2	APlus Entertainment	Concept developer	
2018	Bandish	ARY Digital	Writer	
2025	Jin Ki Shaadi Unki Shaadi	HUM TV	Writer	
