= Shehnaz Pervaiz =

Pakistani actress

- Born: Shehnaz Pervaiz; 6 May 1968 (age 58); Lahore, Pakistan
- Education: University of Lahore
- Occupations: Actress, comedian
- Years active: 1986–present
- Children: 4

Shehnaz Pervaiz (born 5 April 1968) is a Pakistani actress known for her work in Tanveer Fatima (B.A) and Quddusi Sahab Ki Bewah (2012).

== Early life ==
Shehnaz was born in Lahore in 1968 on 5 April. She completed her studies from University of Lahore.

== Career ==
She made her acting debut in 1986 on PTV Channel. She was popular for comedic roles in dramas. She was famous for her pairing with Moin Akhtar in drama Such Much on PTV in 1998.

== Personal life ==
Shehnaz married a television producer and they worked on screen in a puppet show on PTV. She has four children.

== Filmography ==
=== Television ===
Year	Title	Role	Notes
1993	Eid Flight	Shano	PTV
1998	Such Much	Hajra	PTV
2000	Main Hu Na	Mrs. Batiwala	PTV
2009	Nadaaniyaan	Begum Fazil	Geo Entertainment
2009	Tanveer Fatima (B.A)	Guddo	Geo TV
2009	Noorpur Ki Rani	Amma Jee	Hum TV
2010	Hum Thay Jin Ka Saharay	Malka	Geo TV
2011	Bhatti Aur DD	Begum Rabia	TV One
2011	26/2 Bihar Colony	Habiba	Hum TV
2012	Jakaria Kulsoom ki Love Story	Zulekha	ARY Digital
2012	Honeymoon	Sara's mother	Express Entertainment
2012	Dheeli Colony	Asrah	Urdu 1
2013	Upar Gori Ka Makaan	Gulshan	Express Entertainment
2013	Dulha Bhai	Sophia's mother	Urdu 1
2013	Jakaria Kulsoom Ki Love Story (season 2)	Zulekha	ARY Digital
2013	Khelo Pyar Ki Bazi	Jannat	TV One
2013	Bulbulay	Momo's sister	ARY Digital
2013	Quddusi Sahab Ki Bewah	Khajista Jahan	ARY Digital
2014	Joru Ka Ghulam	Reshama	Hum TV
2015	Mitthu Aur Aapa	Rehana	Hum TV
2015	Kia Item Hai	Aapa	Hum TV
2015	Teri Meri Jodi	Almas's mother	Geo TV
2015	Ishq Mohalla	Naila	Hum TV
2015	Googly Mohalla	Aapa Jan	PTV
2015	Love In Gulshan-e-Bihar	Shamim	Hum TV
2015	Yehi Hai Zindagi	Phool's mother	Express Entertainment
2016	Rasgullay	Sajeela	Hum TV
2016	Zaibunnisa	Amma	Hum TV
2016	Jab Tak Ishq Nai Hota	Langari	Express Entertainment
2016	Joru Ka Ghulam	Reshama	Geo TV
2017	Baji Irshad	Resham Chachi	Express TV
2017	Bhatti Aur DD (season 2)	Begum Rabia	TV One
2017	Shaadi Ka Laddu	Sharifa	Express Entertainment
2018	Orangi Ki Anwari	Anwari	TV One
2018	Jin Ki Ayegi Barat	Baji Shunsharajti	Bol Entertainment
2019	Apni Apni Love Story	Sameer's aunt	ARY Digital
2019	Dolly darling	Pammi Aunty	Geo TV
2019	Bulbulay (season 2)	Jamila	ARY Digital
2020	Bulbulay	Nusrat	ARY Digital
2021	Tehra Aangan	Shahnaz Begum	Express Entertainment
2022	Bulbulay	Neelo	ARY Digital
2023	College Gate	Beji	Green Entertainment
2024	Lottery	Suraiya	Set Entertainment
2024	Bajjo	Dilbar's mother	Geo Entertainment
2025	Chulbuley Season 2	Ismail's aunt	Set Entertainment
2025	Bahar Nagar	Banto	Geo TV
2026	Bulbulay	Naheed	ARY Digital

=== Telefilm ===
Year	Title	Role
2009	Bus Stop	Amma
2011	Romance Of Ranchore Line	Sonia
2011	Pichal Periyaan	Husna
2012	Bohat Kha Lia	Bari Apa
2012	Ronaq Jahan Ka Nafsiyati Gharana	Gul-e-Rana
2013	Dulha Bhai	Nazli's mother
2013	Lady Boxer	Aapi
2013	Quddusi Sahab Ki Bewah Eid Special	Khajista Jahan
2016	Jakariya Kulsoom Ki Bari Eid	Zulekha
2016	Desi Girl Videsi Babu	Rahat Begum
2020	Meray Mohallay Ki Larki	Fareeda
2022	Mast Mohabbat	Jibran's mother
2022	Kanpain Tang Rahi Hain	Raheela
2024	Hayee Bechari	Lubna's mother
2024	Andleeb Ka Aashiq	Shamim
2025	Humaira Sumaira	Bibi

=== Film ===
Year	Title	Role
1999	No. 9	Kosar
2014	Na Maloom Afraad	Land lady
2019	Wrong No.2	Aunty
2024	Canister	Shela's aunt
2024	Aur Phir	Sultana
2025	Masooma	Neelo's mother
2026	Ladli Biwi	Bari Aapa

== Awards and nominations ==
- 1995 PTV Award for Best Actress
