= Rang Mahal (TV series) =

2021 Pakistani television series

- Poster
- رنگ محل
- Genre: Romance; Drama; Revenge
- Written by: Shafia Ali
- Directed by: Zahid Mehmood
- Starring: Humayoun Ashraf; Ali Ansari; Sehar Khan; Aruba Mirza; (entire cast)
- Country of origin: Pakistani
- Original language: Urdu
- No. of seasons: 1
- No. of episodes: 92

Production
- Producers: Abdullah Kadwani; Asad Qureshi
- Production locations: Karachi, Pakistan
- Camera setup: Multi-camera setup
- Running time: 40 minutes approx.
- Production company: 7th Sky Entertainment

Original release
- Network: Geo Entertainment
- Release: 24 July – 6 October 2021

Rang Mahal (Urdu: رنگ محل) is a 2021 Pakistani romantic drama serial that first aired on 24 July 2021 on Geo Entertainment. It is produced by Abdullah Kadwani and Asad Qureshi under the banner of 7th Sky Entertainment. It is written by Shafia Khan and directed by Zahid Mehmood. It stars Humayoun Ashraf, Ali Ansari, Sehar Khan and Aruba Mirza.

== Plot ==
Hailing from a middle-class family, Mahpara is a young, confident and beautiful girl who along with her family lives in a servant quarter provided by Fazal Ali for whom Mahpara's father works as a secretary for many years.

On the other hand, Rayed is a handsome young man and being the youngest son of Fazal Ali is beloved of his family. Despite the class differences between Mahpara and Rayed, both of them choose to fall in love with each other at a different time in their lives. The mutual feelings between Rayed and Mahpara draw them closer however realities keep them apart. After suffering irreparable loss and stain on her character, Mahpara chooses to fight for herself and her family. Years later, fate intervenes and hands Mahpara and Rayed a second chance.

== Cast ==
=== Main ===
- Sehar Khan as Mahpara Rehmat
- Ali Ansari as Rayed Ali
- Humayoun Ashraf as Sohail
- Aruba Mirza as Hajra
- Asim Mehmood as Salar

=== Recurring ===
- Fazila Qazi as Shehla
- Sabiha Hashmi as Zulekha; Mahpara's grandmother
- Mohsin Gillani as Fazal Ali; Sohail and Rayed's father
- Rashid Farooqui as Rehmat; Mahpara's father; Fazal Ali's personal secretary (Dead)
- Seemi Pasha as Hajra's mother
- Shajeeruddin as Saleem; Salar's father
- Humaira Bano as Shakeela; Salar's mother
- Tania Amna Hussain as Sara; fiancé of Rayed
- Salma Hassan as Dr. Durdana; Sara's mother and Rayed's mother-in-law to be
- Muhammad Hanif as Shahid Sahab, company senior assistant
- Ellie Zaid as Asma, Mahpara's friend
- Izzah Malik as Maheen, Hajra's friend
- Nida Khan
- Sohail Masood as Fareed, personal assistant Of Fazal Builders
- Urooj Ali
- Arsalan Khan as Shahmir
- Faisal Bali as Shakoor, main servant of Sohail house
- Rehana Kaleem as Kubra, Shakeela's friend

=== Guest appearance ===
- Salma Asim as Shammo, Mahpara's mother
- Shabbir Jan as Mustafa
- Hashim Butt as Saqlain Sahab, company manager

== Accolades ==
Ceremony	Categories	Recipients	Result
21st Lux Style Awards	Best TV Long Play	Rang Mahal	Won
