= Humayoun Ashraf =

Pakistani actor

Humayoun Ashraf is a Pakistani film and television actor. He made his film debut in 2019 with the romantic musical film Sacch.

== Filmography ==
=== Television ===
Year	Title	Role	Additional Notes
2009	Tanveer Fatima (B.A)	Zeeshan	
2012	Ek Tamanna Lahasil Si	Shehzad	
2012	Hisar E Ishq		
2013	Humnasheen	Shahzad	
2013	Ishq Hamari Galiyon Mein	Haroon	
2014	Mere Meherbaan	Danish	
2014	Zid	Raza	
2016	Haasil	Nabeel	
2016	Khuda Aur Muhabbat (season 2)	Abdullah	
2017	Tere Bina	Zubair	
2018	Ab Dekh Khuda Kya Karta Hai	Shaan-e-Alam	
2018	Ishq Na Kariyo Koi	Rehan	
2020	Saza e Ishq	Saim	Main Lead
2021	Rang Mahal	Sohail	Main Lead
2022	Inteqam	Waleed	Main Lead
2023	Ehsaan Faramosh	Kabeer	
2026	Madaar	Samar	Main Lead

=== Film ===
Year	Title	Role	Additional Notes
2019	Sacch		
2023	Dhai Chaal		
