= Tere Bina (TV series) =

- Genre: Family drama Romantic drama Social serial
- Written by: Saqlain Abbas
- Directed by: Syed Ali Raza Usama
- Starring: Sami Khan; Neelam Muneer; Humayun Ashraf; Farah Nadir; Shabbir Jan; Parveen Akbar; Aruba Mirza
- Opening theme: Tere Bina Main Kuch Bhi Nahin by "Asim Azhar" and "Sara Haider"
- Composer: Ayub Khawar
- Country of origin: Pakistan
- Original language: Urdu
- No. of episodes: 31

Production
- Producer: Aijaz Aslam
- Camera setup: Multi-camera setup
- Production companies: Ice Media & Entertainment

Original release
- Network: Geo Entertainment
- Release: 21 February – 6 October 2017

Tere Bina lit. 'Without You'is a Pakistani family romantic drama series, produced by Aijaz Aslam under his production banner Ice Media & Entertainment. The drama aired on Geo Entertainment every Tuesday from 21 February to 6 October 2017. It stars Sami Khan, Neelum Muneer, and Humayun Ashraf.

== Synopsis ==
Tere Bina is the story of two starcrossed lovers from two completely different backgrounds. Hailing from a small town, Pakeezah (Neelum Muneer) belongs to a middle-class family where she faces a lot of restrictions by her parents. Reckless and stubborn, Pakeezah runs away from home to marry Umair (Sami Khan), which changes her life forever. To keep Pakeezah away from the eyes of everyone, Umair decides to keep her at his friend Shan's house. Uninformed by Umair's marriage to Pakeezah, Umair's family presses him to marry his cousin, Bushra. Helpless and unable to refuse, Umair marries Bushra while Pakeezah realises her worth and loses respect for Umair. Umair's divided attention forces Pakeezah to look for love and affection elsewhere.

With Bushra's wicked twists meddling in between, will Umair accept Pakeezah as his wife in front of his family?

== Cast ==
- Neelam Muneer as Pakeezah
- Sami Khan as Umair
- Humayun Ashraf as Zubair
- Shabbir Jan as Umair's father
- Farah Nadir as Abia's mother
- Parveen Akbar as Pakeezah's mother
- Qavi Khan as Pakeezah's father
- Laila Zuberi as Umair's mother
- Fahad Rehmani as Shan
- Inaya Khan as Rida
- Fariya Hassan as Bushra
- Hasan Khan as Hasan
- Laila Wasti as Shan's wife
- Aruba Mirza as Abia
- Tabbasum Arif as Khalida (Bushra's mother)
- Saleem Mairaj as Shehzad
- Iqra Shahid as Ramsha
- Hina Rizvi as Nazia

== Soundtrack ==
The theme song of Tere Bina was composed by Ayub Khawar. The song is sung by Asim Azhar and Sara Haider.
