= Reham Rafiq =

Pakistani actress and dancer (born 1990)

- Born: 19 April 1996 (age 29); Karachi, Sindh, Pakistan
- Occupations: Dancer, Actress, Voiceover artist
- Years active: 2018–present
- Spouse: Shakeeb Azhad Khan (m. 2026)
- Relatives: Nimra Rafiq (sister)

Reham Rafiq is a Pakistani actress, dancer and voiceover artist. She has acted in several films and television series including Khel Khel Mein and Guru.

== Life and career ==
Reham Rafiq began her career as a dancer, participating in an Arts Council dance competition at an early age and later working as a background dancer in productions such as Romeo Weds Heer and Heer Maan Ja. For over two years, she performed with the dance troupe at the Lux Style Awards, where directors frequently positioned her prominently due to her strong expression and choreographic skill.

Following her dance training, Rafiq expanded into voice‑over work. Her ability to modulate her voice led her to provide dubbing for animated characters—often voicing male child roles—and for Turkish dramas. She has described this as an early phase of her career before acting opportunities emerged. She began voice‑over work around 2010 and later focused more seriously on dubbing after completing her education.

Her acting debut came with the Nabeel Qureshi–directed feature film Khel Khel Mein (2021), in which she appeared alongside Sajal Aly and Bilal Abbas Khan in a credited role as Noorie. Thereafter, she appeared in television dramas including Jhoom (2023), Kaffara (2024), Judwaa (2025), and Parwarish (2025), earning recognition for her performances—particularly for her role as Amal in Parwarish.

During her acting career, Rafiq has remained highly active on social media, regularly sharing dance clips and engaging with followers. Several of her dance videos—such as an impromptu performance at a friend's wedding and dance reels from drama sets—have gone viral and generated significant public discussion.

Besides dance and acting, she demonstrated her voice‑over ability in public appearances, including performing a live dubbing demonstration on Tabish Hashmi's Hasna Mana Hai, where she voiced a cartoon character live on stage.

== Personal life ==
Reham is the younger sister of singer Nimra Rafiq. In April 2025, Reham married Shakeeb Khan in a close family ceremony. According to reports, both her family and her husband offer strong support for her career.

== Filmography ==
=== Film ===
Year	Title	Role	Notes
2019	Heer Maan Ja	Background dancer	
2021	Khel Khel Mein	Noorie	

=== Television ===
Year	Title	Role	Notes
2023	Guru		Express Entertainment
2023	Jhoom	Tina	Geo Entertainment
2024	Kaffara	Kiran	Geo Entertainment
2024	Judwaa	Rakshi	Hum TV
2025	Parwarish	Amal	ARY Digital
