= Inteqam (TV series) =

2022 Pakistani soap drama serial

- Genre: Family; Romantic; Tragedy; Soap opera
- Written by: Saira Arif
- Directed by: Zahid Mehmood
- Starring: Aruba Mirza; Humayoun Ashraf adlakhan
- Country of origin: Pakistan
- Original language: Urdu
- No. of episodes: 74

Production
- Producers: Abdullah Kadwani; Asad Qureshi
- Running time: 37 minutes approx.
- Production company: 7th Sky Entertainment

Original release
- Network: Geo Entertainment
- Release: 10 January – 24 March 2022

Inteqam (Urdu: انتقام, lit. 'Revenge') is a 2022 Pakistani television series, directed by Zahid Mehmood and written by Saira Arif. It is produced by Abdullah Kadwani and Asad Qureshi under their banner 7th Sky Entertainment. It premiered on 10 January 2022 on Geo TV. It stars Aruba Mirza and Humayoun Ashraf.

== Synopsis ==
The protagonist Uroosa's siblings conflict with their maternal relatives to settle an inheritance. Burdened with unemployment and dowry demand, her siblings Shahzad and Saima file for their mother's right over their grandparents' wealth. The legal proceedings put Uroosa's love life through a difficult test as her cousin and childhood love, Waleed, is no longer welcome in her house despite his efforts to help them. When Waleed's father weakens Abida's stance with stronger evidence against property distribution, the conflict gets much worse. This puts his family in haste to send him abroad and distance him from Uroosa.

== Cast ==
- Aruba Mirza as Uroosa
- Humayoun Ashraf as Waleed
- Haris Waheed as Shahzad; Seema and Uroosa's brother
- Asim Mehmood as Bilal; Mohsin's brother, Saima's brother-in-law. Zoya's husband.
- Ellie Zaid as Beenish aka Beeni; Waleed's sister
- Adla Khan as Seema; Shahzad and Uroosa's sister. Mohsins wife.
- Sumaiyya Bukhsh as Zoya; Bilal's wife and Uroosa's friend
- Shabbir Jan as Zaheer; Waleed and Benni's father
- Yasir Shoro as Raheel; Beenish's husband. Had an affair with another girl.
- Noor ul Hassan as Saleem; Shahzad, Saima and Uroosa's father
- Zainab Qayyum as Saba; Waleed and Benni's mother
- Sadaf Aashan as Abida; Shahzad, Saima and Uroosa's mother
- Mizna Waqas as Neelo; Mohsin and Bilal's sister
- Shaheen Khan as Shimmi; Neelo, Mohsin and Bilal's mother
- Naveed Raza as Mohsin; Seema's husband.
- Farah Nadeem as Sonia; Zoya's Mother
- Hashim Butt as Ashfaq; Zoya's Father
- Taqi Ahmed as Behram; Waleed's friend
- Birjees Farooqui as Tehmina; Behram's mother
- Maria Gul as Sheena; Beenish's friend
- Areej Chaudhary as Bubbly; Beenish's friend. Raheels girlfriend.
- Uzair Abbasi as Rasheed Baba; Servant at Waleed's home
- Akbar Islam as Idress; Neelo's fiancé (Guest Appearance)
- Omi butt as Usman; Waleed's friend (Guest Appearance)
- Ahmed Bashir

== Soundtrack ==
The official original soundtrack of Inteqam features Qamar Nashad's poetry, Naveed Nashad's music composition and vocals of Nabeel Shaukat Ali and Fiza Javed.
