= Sadaf Kanwal =

Pakistani actress and model

- صدف کَنوَل
- Born: 29 August 1993 (age 33)
- Occupations: Actress; model
- Years active: 2014 – present
- Spouse: Shehroz Sabzwari (m. 2020)
- Children: 1
- Relatives: Salma Mumtaz (grandmother); Shammi (great aunt); Nida Mumtaz (aunt)

Sadaf Kanwal Sabzwari, née Kanwal (Urdu: صدف کَنوَل), is a Pakistani actress and model. She has played the role of Sharmeen Mukhtiyar in the 2017 movie Balu Mahi. Kanwal later played a supporting role in the period drama Alif (2019). She has been nominated for several awards including Lux Style Awards and Hum Awards.

== Personal life ==
Kanwal is the granddaughter of Pakistani actress Salma Mumtaz and the niece of Nida Mumtaz and Shammi.

On 31 May 2020, Kanwal married Pakistani actor Shahroz Sabzwari. The couple welcomed their first baby girl on 9 August 2022.

In an interview to a local media group, Kanwal stirred controversy and faced backlash after her remarks regarding role of women in a marriage. She said that "our husbands are our culture" and "so is picking up their shoes and ironing their clothes". This was not the only time that she faced criticism and backlash over her controversial statements. In yet another interview, she belittled the #MeToo movement by stating " Why are you remembering it later?"

== Filmography ==
Key
†	denotes film / drama that has not released yet

Year	Title	Role	Notes
2017	Balu Mahi	Sharmeen Mukhtiyar	
2017	Na Maloom Afraad 2	Cameo	Special appearance in song "Kaif o Suroor"
Television
2014	Meka Aur Susral		Television debut
2019	Apni Apni Love Story	Shanzey	Telefilm
2019	Alif	Neha	
2021	Lockdown	Saira	Telefilm

== Awards and nominations ==
Year	Award	Category	Result	Ref.
2015	Lux Style Awards	Best Model of the Year - Female	Won	
2016	Lux Style Awards	Best Model of the Year - Female	Nominated	
2016	Hum Awards	Best Model Female	Nominated	
2017	Lux Style Awards	Best Model of the Year - Female	Nominated	
2017	Hum Style Awards	Most Stylish Model - Female	Won	
2018	Lux Style Awards	Best Supporting Actress - Film	Nominated	
2019	Lux Style Awards	Model of the Year - female	Won	
