= Ali Ansari (actor) =

Pakistani actor, model, musician

- Born: 8 September 1984 (age 42); Lahore, Punjab, Pakistan
- Citizenship: Pakistani
- Education: Graduation In Economics and Finance IoBM. McGill
- Occupations: Actor; Model; Rapper; Drummer; Radio jockey
- Years active: 2014–present
- Notable work: Rang Mahal (2021); Kaffara (2024)
- Spouse: Saboor Aly (m. 2022)
- Children: 1
- Relatives: Mariam Ansari (sister); Sajal Aly (sister-in-law)

Ali Ansari (Urdu: علی انصاری; born 8 September 1987) is a Pakistani actor, model, rapper, musician (trained drummer) and radio jockey. Known for his roles in Urdu drama serials and his versatile screen presence. Since his debut in the 2010s, he has become a familiar face on major Pakistani networks, gaining recognition for both acting and musical performances.

== Career ==
=== Radio jockey and model ===
Born in Lahore, his family moved to Saudi Arabia and when they came back in 2005 and settled down in Karachi, he began his career as an RJ for the hit radio show Dude, Where's My Song? before becoming a model.

=== Music ===
He has released a few songs, including Tere Naal Naal with Dino Ali in 2011 and the rap single Itna Deep Jaoge in 2022. In 2023 he released another rap song, Escobar, for which he also co-wrote the lyrics. Referencing the Colombian drug lord Pablo Escobar, the track was noted for drawing on Western hip-hop traditions of flaunting affluence, with lyrics and a music video that emphasize luxury, expensive cars, cash, and an aspirational lifestyle, rather than the more common rags-to-riches narratives in local hip-hop.

=== Acting ===
He made his debut as a television actor in the 2015 television soap series, Riffat Appa Ki Bahuein. He gained popularity by playing the role of "Saarim" in romantic saga Khaani, "Arham" in Mehreen Jabbar's small screen venture Dino Ki Dulhaniya and as "Rayed" in Rang Mahal (2021).

== Filmography ==
=== Television series ===
Year	Title	Role	Network	Notes
2015	Riffat Aapa Ki Bahuein	Arsaam	ARY Digital	
2015	Aik Thi Misaal	Saifi	Hum TV	
2015	Teri Meri Jodi		Geo Entertainment	
2016	Iss Khamoshi Ka Matlab	Ali	Geo Entertainment	
2016	Meri Saheli Meri Bhabi	Hammad	Geo Entertainment	
2016	Saya-e-Dewar Bhi Nahi	William	Hum TV	
2016	Haya Kay Rang	Yousuf	ARY Digital	
2017	Khaani	Sarim Ali Khan	Geo Entertainment	Cameo
2017	Bubbly Kya Chahti Hai	Umer	ARY Digital	
2017	Andaaz-e-Sitam	Samar	Urdu 1	
2017	Alif Allah Aur Insaan	Arsalan	Hum TV	
2017	Naseebon Jali		Hum TV	
2017	Ghar Titli Ka Par	Aftab	Geo Entertainment	
2018	Baba Jani	Umair	Geo Entertainment	
2018	Kabhi Band Kabhi Baja		Express Entertainment	Episodic appearance
2018	Ay Dil Tu Bata	Ahmed	Geo Entertainment	
2018	Seerat	Danish	Geo Entertainment	
2019	Shahrukh Ki Saliyan	Dildar	Geo Entertainment	
2019	Kam Zarf	Asim	Geo Entertainment	
2019	Naqab Zan	Meerab	Hum TV	
2019	Darr Khuda Say	Azhar	Geo Entertainment	
2019	Mohabbat Na Kariyo		Geo Entertainment	
2019	Kahin Deep Jaley	Touqeer	Geo Entertainment	
2020	Muqaddar	Haris	Geo Entertainment	
2020	Makafaat		Geo Entertainment	Various episodes
2020	Dikhawa	Hasham	Geo Entertainment	Various episodes
2020	Gustakh	Emaad	Express Entertainment	
2020	Kasa-e-Dil	Hatim	Geo Entertainment	
2020	Dil Tanha Tanha	Asfand	Hum TV	
2020	Chalawa	Harib Khanzada	Hum TV	
2021	Rang Mahal	Rayad	Geo Entertainment	
2021	Bebaak	Mesum	Hum TV	
2023	Samjhota	Zohaib	ARY Digital	
2023	Siyaah	Sarim	Green Entertainment	Episode "Khoat"
2023	Dil Hi Tou Hai	Moeed	ARY Digital	
2024	Chaal	Sikander Sami	Geo Entertainment	
2024	Kaffara	Salar Sikander	Geo Entertainment	
2025	Aas Paas	Dr. Saham	Geo Entertainment	
2025	Naqaab	Bilal Jamal	ARY Digital	
2025	Faaslay	Zaviyar	Green Entertainment	
2025	Muamma	Junaid	Hum TV	
2026	Bombay Tailors	Saifi	Hum TV	

=== Telefilms ===
Year	Title	Role	Network	Ref(s)
2018	Dino Ki Dulhania	Arham	Geo Entertainment	
2025	Saiyyan Thanedaar	Police inspector Ramil	Green Entertainment	
2025	V Logger Da Viyah	Bilal "Billu" Khan	Hum TV	
