= Sogen Kato =

2010 Japanese fraud case

- 加藤 宗現
- Born: 22 July 1899
- Died: c. November 1978 (aged 79); Adachi, Tokyo, Japan
- Cause of death: Claimed by relatives to be Sokushinbutsu; undetermined according to official autopsy

Sogen Kato (加藤 宗現, Katō Sōgen; 22 July 1899 – c. November 1978) was a Japanese man thought to have been Tokyo's oldest man until July 2010, when his mummified corpse was found in his bedroom. It was concluded he had likely died in November 1978, aged 79, and his family had never reported his death. Relatives had rebuffed attempts by ward officials to see Kato in preparations for Respect for the Aged Day later that year, citing many reasons from his being a "human vegetable" to becoming a sokushinbutsu (Buddhist mummy). An autopsy could not determine the cause of Kato's death.

The discovery of Kato's remains sparked a search for other missing centenarians lost due to poor recordkeeping by officials. A study following the discovery of Kato's remains found that police did not know if 234,354 people over the age of 100 were still alive. Poor recordkeeping was to blame for many of the cases, officials admitted. One of Kato's relatives was found guilty of fraud; his relatives claimed ¥9,500,000 (US$117,939; £72,030) of the pension meant for Kato.

== History ==
=== Discovery of the body ===
An illustration of where Kato's mummified body was discovered. (1) Location of where the body was found; (2) Newspaper from 1978; (3) Rotary dial telephone; (4) Main entrance. (Note: This illustration is based on a reconstruction of Kato's house shown on the Nippon Television program Bankisha.)

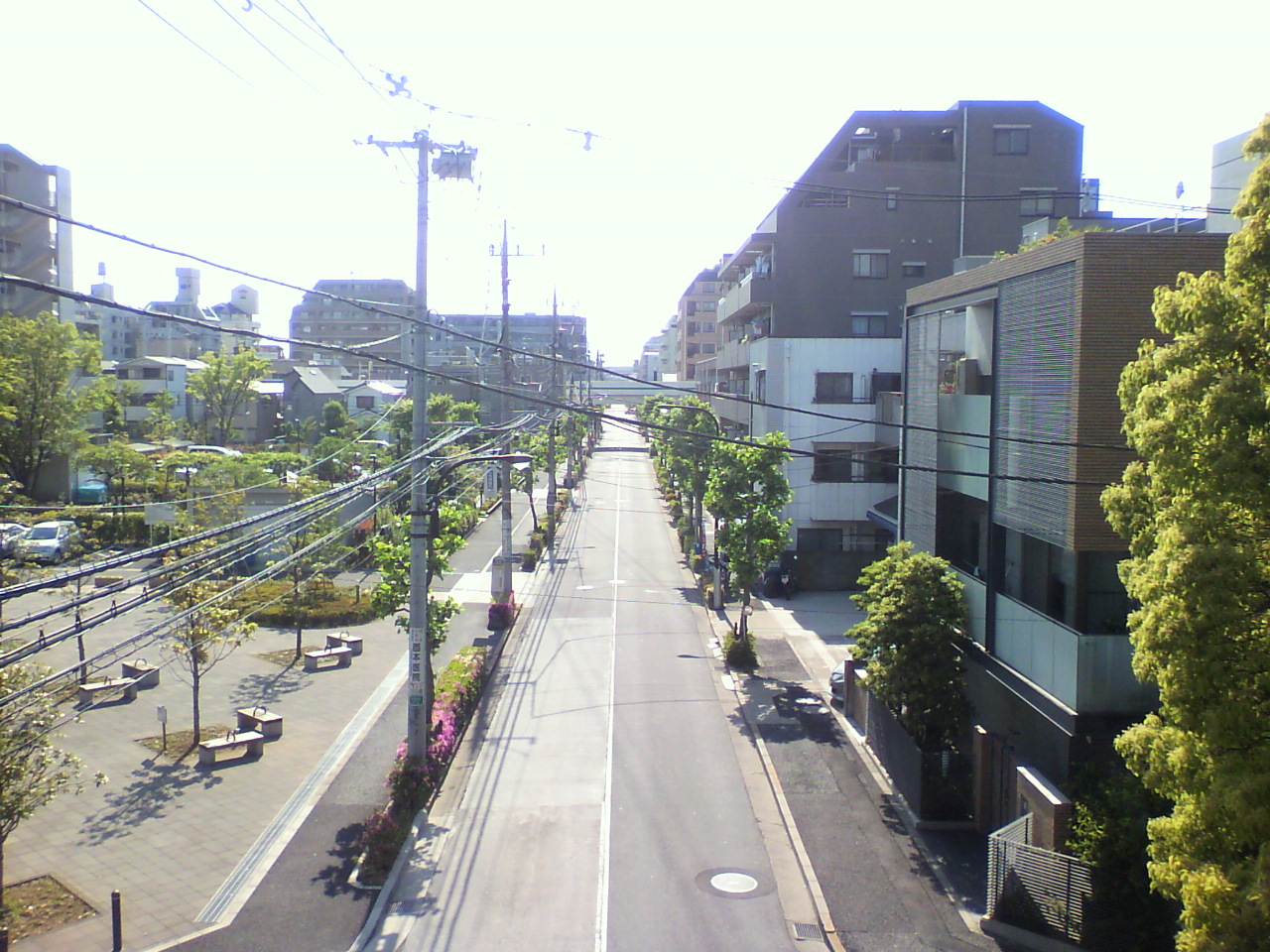
Adachi, Tokyo, where Kato's body was found

After tracking down the residence in Adachi, Tokyo, where Kato was reportedly living, attempts by officials to meet him were rebuffed numerous times by the family. Many reasons were given by his relatives, including that he was a "human vegetable" and that he was becoming a sokushinbutsu.

Eventually, Kato's body was found by police and ward officials on Wednesday, 27 July 2010, when ward officials intending to honour his achievement of longevity on Respect for the Aged Day later that year were again rebuffed and police broke into the house. Found in a first-floor room, Kato's mummified remains were lying on a bed wearing underwear and pajamas and were covered with a blanket. Newspapers that were found in the room dated back three decades to the Shōwa period, suggesting that Kato's death may have occurred around November 1978. An official named Yutaka Muroi said, "His family must have known he has been dead all these years and acted as if nothing happened. It's so eerie."

The day after the visit, Kato's granddaughter told an acquaintance that "my grandfather shut himself in a room on the first floor of our home 32 years ago, and we couldn't open the door from the outside. My mother said, 'Leave him in there,' and he was left as he was. I think he's dead." One official had reported concerns about Kato's safety earlier in the year to his ward office. An autopsy failed to determine the cause of Kato's death.

=== Fraud trial ===
Following the discovery of Kato's body, two of his relatives were arrested in August 2010, and subsequently charged with fraud. Prosecutors alleged that Michiko Kato, 81, Kato's daughter, and Tokimi Kato, 53, his granddaughter, fraudulently received about ¥9,500,000 ($117,939; £72,030) of pension money. In addition, after Kato's wife died in 2004 at the age of 101, ¥9,450,000 ($117,318; £71,651) from a survivor's mutual pension was deposited into Kato's bank account between October 2004 and June 2010. Approximately ¥6,050,000 ($75,108; £45,872) was withdrawn before his body was discovered. Kato was likely paid a senior welfare benefit from the time he turned 70, which the family may also have used to their advantage. Investigators said that the pair defrauded the Japan Mutual Aid Association of Public School Teachers, who transferred the money into Kato's account.

In November 2010, the Tokyo District Court sentenced Tokimi Kato to a 2½-year sentence for fraud, suspended for four years. Judge Hajime Shimada said, "The defendant committed a malicious crime with the selfish motive of securing revenue for her family. However, she has paid back the pension benefits and expressed remorse for the crime."

== Aftermath ==
After the discovery of Kato's mummified corpse, other checks into elderly centenarians across Japan produced reports of missing centenarians and faulty recordkeeping. Tokyo officials attempted to find the oldest woman in the city, 113-year-old Fusa Furuya, who was registered as living with her daughter. Furuya's daughter said she had not seen her mother for over 25 years. The revelations about the disappearance of Furuya and the death of Kato prompted a nationwide investigation, which concluded that police did not know if 234,354 people older than 100 were still alive. More than 77,000 of these people, officials said, would have been older than 120 years old if they were still alive. Poor record keeping was blamed for many of the cases, and officials said that many may have died during World War II. One register claimed a man was still alive at age 186.

Many of those gone missing are men who left their hometowns to look for work in Japan's big cities during the country's pre-1990s boom years. Many of them worked obsessively long hours and never built a social network in their new homes. Others found less economic success than they'd hoped. Ashamed of that failure, they didn't feel they could return home.

— The Globe and Mail report

Following the revelations about Kato and Furuya, analysts investigated why recordkeeping by Japanese authorities was poor. Many seniors have, it has been reported, moved away from their family homes. Statistics show that divorce is becoming increasingly common among the elderly. Dementia, which afflicts more than two million Japanese, is also a contributing factor. "Many of those gone missing are men who left their hometowns to look for work in Japan's big cities during the country's pre-1990s boom years. Many of them worked obsessively long hours and never built a social network in their new homes. Others found less economic success than they'd hoped. Ashamed of that failure, they didn't feel they could return home," a Canadian newspaper reported several months after the discovery of Kato's body.

Japan has the highest percentage of elderly people in the world; as of October 2010, 23.1 percent of the population were found to be aged 65 and over, and 11.1 percent were 75 and over. This has largely been caused by a very low birthrate; as of 2005, the rate was 1.25 babies for every woman—to keep the population steady the number needed to be 2.1. However, the issue of aging in the country has been increased by the government's unwillingness to let immigrants into the country—foreign nationals accounted for only 1.2 percent of the total population as of 2005. A 2006 report by the government indicates that by 2050, 1/3 of the population may be elderly.

The inquiry also noted that many elderly Japanese citizens were dying in solitude. "Die alone and in two months all that is left is the stench, a rotting corpse and maggots," The Japan Times said in an editorial, one of many comments from the country's press on the news. An editorial in Asahi Shimbun said that the findings suggested "deeper problems" in the Japanese register system. "The families who are supposed to be closest to these elderly people don't know where they are and, in many cases, have not even taken the trouble to ask the police to search for them," read the editorial. "The situation shows the existence of lonely people who have no family to turn to and whose ties with those around them have been severed."

One Japanese doctor, however, said he was not surprised at the news. Dr. Aiba Miyoji of the Tokyo Koto Geriatric Medical Centre said many Japanese seniors were dying alone, ignored by their families. "Some patients come in with their families, but many are alone or come in just with their social workers," he said. "It happens especially in Tokyo. There are more and more single-person families." Dr. Aiba added that a key reason for the statistics was because people in Japan are living longer than ever before. "That achievement is placing new burdens on a society where a declining number of working-age Japanese have to fund rising health-care and pension costs," The Globe and Mail reported. Dr. Aiba said that because Tokyo was so crowded, families cannot remain in the same household. "There's not enough space for families to live together any more," he said.

A national census in 2005 found that 3.86 million elderly Japanese citizens were living alone, compared with 2.2 million a decade before. 24.4 percent of men and 9.3 percent of women over the age of 60 in Japan have no neighbours, friends or relatives on whom they could rely, a more recent study discovered. In 2008, the Associated Press reported that the number of elderly people committing suicide had reached a record high because of health and economic worries. "In what appears to be a collective cry for help, more than 30,000 Japanese seniors are arrested every year for shoplifting. Many of those arrested told police they stole out of feelings of boredom and isolation, rather than any economic necessity," The Globe and Mail reported after the discovery of Kato's corpse. Jeff Kingston, the director of Asian studies at the Japan Campus of Temple University, said, "It is a humanising phenomenon—the Japanese are traditionally seen as sober, law-abiding people—when they are in fact scamsters like the rest of us. [The story of the missing centenarians] holds up a mirror to society and reflects realities that many in Japan do not want to accept."

== See also ==
- Aging of Japan
- Blue zone
- Elderly people in Japan
- List of Japanese supercentenarians
- Lists of centenarians
