= Kodokushi =

"Lonely death" in Japan

Kodokushi (孤独死) or lonely death, is a Japanese phenomenon of people dying alone and remaining undiscovered for a long period of time. First described in the 1980s, kodokushi has become an increasing problem in Japan, attributed to economic troubles and Japan's increasingly elderly population. It is also known as koritsushi (孤立死) ("isolation death") and dokkyoshi (独居死) ("live alone death").

== History ==
Kodokushi was first documented in Japanese newspapers during the 1970s, and studies exploring the phenomenon began as early as 1973, with surveys conducted by the National Social Welfare Council and National Union of Voluntary District Welfare Commissioners. The first instance that became national news in Japan was in 2000 when the corpse of a 69-year-old man was discovered three years after his death; his monthly rent and utilities had been withdrawn automatically from his bank account and only after his savings were depleted was his skeleton discovered at his home. The body had been consumed by maggots and beetles.

== Statistics ==
Statistics regarding kodokushi are often incomplete or inaccurate. Kodokushi mostly affects men who are 50 or older. Japan's public broadcaster NHK reported that 32,000 elderly people nationwide died alone in 2009. The number of kodokushi tripled between 1983 and 1994, with 1,049 lonely deaths reported in Tokyo in 1994. In 2008, there were more than 2,200 reported lonely deaths in Tokyo. Similar numbers were reported in 2011. One private moving company in Osaka reported that 20% of the moving company's jobs (300 per year) involved removing the belongings of people who had died lonely deaths. Approximately 4.5% of funerals in 2006 involved instances of kodokushi.

During the first half of 2024, the National Police Agency reported that 37,227 individuals living alone were found dead at home, with 70% of these being aged 65 and above, and nearly 4,000 bodies discovered more than a month after death, including 130 that remained unnoticed for at least a year.

== Causes ==
Several reasons for the increase in kodokushi have been proposed. One proposed reason is increased social isolation. A decreasing proportion of elderly Japanese people are living in multi-generational housing and are instead living alone. Elderly people who live alone are more likely to lack social contacts with family and neighbors, and are therefore more likely to die alone and remain undiscovered.

Additionally, Japan's economic slump since 1990 has been cited as contributing to the increase in lonely deaths. Since 1990, many Japanese salarymen have been forced into early retirement. Many of these men have never married and become socially isolated when removed from the corporate culture.

Masaki Ichinose, head of the University of Tokyo's Institute of Death and Life Studies, hypothesizes that the increase in kodokushi is linked to Japan's contemporary culture which ignores death. Several hundred years ago, Japanese people commonly confronted death; for example, bodies were typically buried by family members. In contrast, in modern Japan, there are fewer opportunities to witness death and death is not readily discussed.

Hypothesized psychological reasons for the increase in kodokushi include social apathy and life stress. Social isolation is used as a coping mechanism to avoid stressful situations. Scholars have also analyzed how "contemporary discourse constructs kodokushi as a 'bad death' and as evidence for the decay of traditional social bonds, such as family, neighborhood and company ties," with government and community initiatives thereby pushing "to implement new welfare systems, often suggesting to re-activate lost family and community bonds".

== Responses ==
Some districts in Japan have begun campaigns and movements to prevent lonely deaths. Officials in Tokyo's Shinjuku Ward have started a kodokushi awareness campaign that includes scheduled social events and checking in on the well-being of elderly citizens.

Miyu Kojima, an artist from Japan, creates miniature dioramas of the rooms where kodokushi victims were found. She works as a lonely death cleaner. The miniatures are composites of places she has cleaned. Her aim is to raise awareness for the phenomenon.

== In other countries ==
The phenomenon has been highlighted as a cause for concern in Hong Kong and South Korea. Like Japan, both have ageing populations and increasing numbers of elderly people living alone and isolated.

In South Korea, the equivalent is called godoksa (Hangul: 고독사), the Korean pronunciation of the Hanja characters (孤獨死). As godoksa is not a legal term, such deaths are often classified as "unconnected deaths". The term has been expanded to describe deaths (whether natural or suicide) of the middle-aged who are single and withdrawn from society.

== In popular culture ==
- The 2024 song Safe & Well by Scottish indie rock band Arab Strap follows the unnoticed death of a person who was living alone during the COVID-19 pandemic.
- In the 2022 book Touch by the Icelandic author Olaf Olafsson, the former Japanese girlfriend of the main character, living alone in Japan and isolated in her apartment due to the COVID-19 pandemic, mentions the word when explaining her current situation. In the 2024 movie adaptation, the word is introduced by an elderly Japanese businessman that the main character meets.

== See also ==
- Hikikomori
- Karoshi
- Suicide in Japan
