= Minal Khan =

Pakistani influencer and former actress (born 1998)

- منال خان
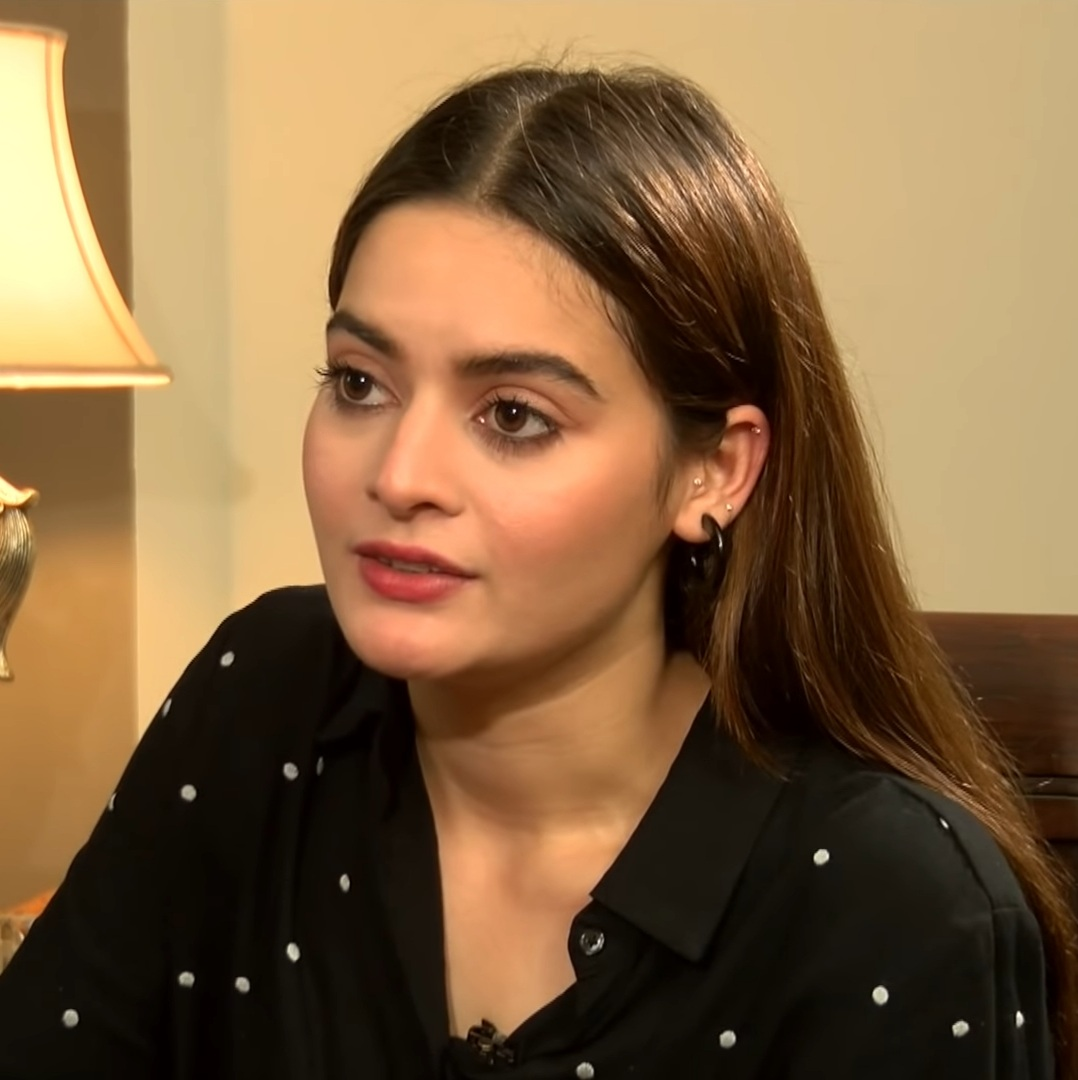
- Minal Khan during Interview to BBC Urdu
- Born: Minal Mubeen Khan; Karachi, Sindh, Pakistan
- Education: Ideal Federal Secondary School
- Occupations: Influencer; actress; model
- Years active: 2011–2021 (Actress); 2021–present (Influencer)
- Known for: Dil Nawaz (2017); Jalan (2020); Ishq Hai (2021)
- Spouse: Ahsan Mohsin Ikram (m. 2021)
- Children: 1
- Relatives: Aiman Khan (twin-sister); Muneeb Butt (brother-in-law)
- Awards: ARY People's Choice Awards

Minal Mubeen Khan is a Pakistani influencer and former actress who had appeared in Urdu television. She made her acting debut as a child artist in Kaash Main Teri Beti Na Hoti (2011). She received critical acclaim for her performances in Quddusi Sahab Ki Bewah (2014), Sun Yaara (2017) and Parchayee (2018).

Later, Khan appeared in successful series Hasad (2019), Jalan (2020), Nand (2020) and Ishq Hai (2021). She is the recipient of ARY People's Choice Awards. In 2021, Minal got married and took a break from acting.

== Early and Personal life ==
Khan was born with her twin sister Aiman Khan who is also an actress. Besides Aiman, she has three brothers. She belongs to an Urdu-speaking Muhajir family from Karachi. She completed her schooling in Ideal Federal Secondary School Karachi.

On 11 June 2021, Minal got engaged to Parchayee co-star Ahsan Mohsin Ikram. They Both got married on 10 September 2021 in a private ceremony. On 1 November 2023, Khan gave birth to their son named Muhammed Hassan Ikram.

== Career ==
=== Early work and established actress (2011–2021) ===
In 2011, Minal made her acting debut as child artist in Geo Entertainment's Kaash Main Teri Beti Na Hoti alongside Fatima Effendi and Danish Taimoor. Then, in 2012 she appeared in a supporting role on the sitcom series Quddusi Sahab Ki Bewah opposite Hina Dilpazeer and Uroosa Siddiqui.

She appeared 2013 social dramatic series Mann Ke Moti along with Yasra Rizvi, Faysal Qureshi and Aiman Khan. In 2014, Minal Subsequently, she gained wider recognition for portraying as Fariya in Mere Meherbaan opposite Ayeza Khan. Then, she gained critical acclaim through family series Sun Yaara alongside Hira Mani and Junaid Khan for which she received nomination in ARY Digital Social Media Drama Awards for Best Supporting Actress.

After portraying numerous supportive roles in 2017, Khan made her first debut as lead actress in family and societal pressure series Beti To Main Bhi Hun opposite Faraz Farooqui. Minal then, appeared as College student in Horror series Dil Nawaz with Neelam Muneer and Wahaj Ali. In the same year she portrayed as Innocent Pari in romantic series Parchayee along with Sabreen Hisbani, Ahsan Mohsin Ikram and Hammad Farooqui. And the series, well-received by critics.

In 2019, Khan portrayed as a kind hearted Naintara in Jealousy betrayal series Hasad opposite Arij Fatyma and Noor Hassan Rizvi. Then in 2020, she became established herself after portraying as a Over ambitious Nisha as an Antagonist in Jalan along with Emmad Irfani and Areeba Habib. Khan's performance gained her immense popularity and latter received nomination in ARY People's Choice Awards for Favourite Actress.

In the same year, Minal acted as a Housewife and Kind hearted girl in tragedy series Nand opposite Shehroz Sabzwari and Faiza Hasan for which she won ARY People's Choice Awards for Favorite Actor in a role of Bhabhi. In 2021, she appeared in family romantic series Ishq Hai alongside Danish Taimoor in their second project together after Kaash Main Teri Beti Na Hoti which was well-received by audiences.

== Other work and media image ==
Khan has also appeared as a guest on various shows. She, was briefly appeared in anthology series Ustani Jee and Kabhi Band Kabhi Baja In 2017, Khan was featured 6th in "Top 10 New Actresses Of Pakistani Drama Industry" list for her performance in Quddusi Sahab Ki Bewah. She was placed in Hello Pakistan's HOT100 list, in the "Trailblazers" category in 2020. Then, Minal placed in "Most Talented Youngest Pakistani Actresses" list.

Also, she featured 14th in "The Most Beautiful Pakistani Actresses 2020" list. The actress serves as a brand ambassador for several products such as The Tecno Spark 7 Pro and has done several photoshoots. In 2021, Khan was featured in "Most Popular Pakistani Actors" list. As of April 2024, Khan was the seventh most-followed Pakistani celebrity on Instagram.

== Filmography ==
=== TV series ===
| Year | Title | Role | Network | Ref | Notes |
|---|---|---|---|---|---|
| 2011–2012 | Kaash Main Teri Beti Na Hoti | Bano | Geo Entertainment | | Debut series Child artist |
| 2012–2013 | Mohabbat Jaye Bhar Mein | Rani | Hum TV | | |
| 2012–2014 | Quddusi Sahab Ki Bewah | Aneesa | ARY Digital | | |
| 2013 | Adhoori Aurat | Arshiya | Geo Entertainment | | |
| 2013 | Rehaai | Young Shamim | Hum TV | | |
| 2013–2014 | Mann Ke Moti | Kaavish | Geo Entertainment | | |
| 2014 | Mere Meherbaan | Fariya Baseer | Hum TV | | |
| 2014 | Mithu Aur Aapa | Meenu | Hum TV | | |
| 2015 | Mol | Ghazia | Hum TV | | |
| 2016 | Joru Ka Ghulam | Natasha | Geo Entertainment | | |
| 2016–2017 | Hum Sab Ajeeb Se Hain | Eisha | Aaj Entertainment | | Ramadan special |
| 2017 | Sun Yaara | Hina Afaq | ARY Digital | | |
| 2017 | Malkin | Seemi | Geo Entertainment | | |
| 2017 | Beti To Main Bhi Hun | Haya | Urdu 1 | | Debut as lead actress |
| 2017 | Laut Ke Chalay Aana | Khadija | Geo Entertainment | | |
| 2017–2018 | Dil Nawaz | Kiran | A-Plus Entertainment | | |
| 2017–2018 | Parchayee | Parishay (Pari) | Hum TV | | |
| 2018 | Ghamand | Umm e Hani | A-Plus Entertainment | | |
| 2018 | Ki Jaana Main Kaun | Meher Faris | Hum TV | | |
| 2019 | Hasad | Naintara | ARY Digital | | |
| 2019–2020 | Qismat | Soha Rayan | Hum TV | | |
| 2020 | Jalan | Nisha Asfandyar Khan | ARY Digital | | |
| 2020–2021 | Nand | Rabi | ARY Digital | | |
| 2021 | Ishq Hai | Isra Shahzaib | ARY Digital | | |

=== Telefilms and Special appearances ===
| Year | Title | Role | Network | Ref. | Notes |
|---|---|---|---|---|---|
| 2018 | Ustani Jee | Salma | Hum TV | | Episode: 1 |
| 2018 | Kabhi Band Kabhi Baja | Lubna | Express Entertainment | | Episode: 2 |
| 2019 | Jab Tum Milay | Sadia | Aey Zindagi | | Short film |
| 2019 | Doodh Patti | Gul | Dramas Central | | Short film |
| 2020 | Pyaas | Shameem | Bizon TV | | Telefilm |
| 2020 | Aik Say Barh Kar Aik | Anam | ARY Digital | | Telefilm |
| 2021 | Lockdown | Zoya | Express Entertainment | | Telefilm |

=== Music videos ===
| Year | Song | Artist | Ref |
|---|---|---|---|
| 2020 | "Yaddaan" | Uzair Jaswal | |

== Awards and nominations ==
| Year | Work | Category | Result | Ref. |
ARY People's Choice Awards
| 2021 | Jalan | Favorite Actress | Nominated | |
| 2021 | Nand | Favorite Actress in Wife Role | Nominated | |
| 2021 | Nand | Favorite Actress in Bahu Role | Nominated | |
| 2021 | Nand | Favorite Actress in Bhabhi Role | Won | |
Lux Style Awards
| 2022 | Ishq Hai | Best TV Actress - Viewer's choice | Nominated | |
International Pakistan Prestige Awards
| 2019 | Kabhi Band Kabhi Baja | Best Actress Serial | Nominated | |
ARY Digital Social Media Drama Awards
| 2018 | Sun Yaara | Best Supporting Role Female | Nominated | |
Hum Social Media Awards
| 2020 | —N/a | Most Popular Actor (Female) | Nominated | |
