= Javeria Saud =

Pakistani actress (born 1972)

- Born: Javeria Jalil; 26 July 1972 (age 54); Karachi, Sindh, Pakistan
- Occupations: Actress; screenwriter; host; producer; singer
- Years active: 1993–present
- Spouse: Saud (m. 2005)
- Children: 2

Javeria Saud (née Jalil) is a Pakistani television actress, producer, screenwriter, singer, and host. She is best known for playing the protagonist Jameela in Geo TV's television drama series Yeh Zindagi Hai (2008–13). She is married to the film and television actor Saud. They jointly own the production house JJS Productions since 2006. She took a break from acting in 2001, and made a comeback in 2006. In 2011, she co-produced Khuda Aur Muhabbat with Babar Javed.

== Career ==
=== Early work ===
Javeria entered the showbiz industry in 1993 as a Naat reciter. She made her acting debut in 1995 and appeared in various television dramas throughout the 1990s. Some of her notable television shows are Manzilein, Anhoni, Tipu Sultan: The Tiger Lord, Maa, Thori Khushi Thora Ghum, Khaali Aankhein, Harjaaye, Piya Ka Ghar Piyara Lage, Khala Qulsum Ka Kumba, Piyari Shammo, Rishte Mohabbaton Ke, Saharay and Mera Naam Hai Mohabbat.

In 2008, she produced and starred in the television series Yeh Zindagi Hai, which ran for six years.

Since 2015, she hosts the morning show, Satrangi and Ramadan transmissions as well.

=== Acting comeback and critical acclaim (2020-present) ===
In 2020, she made an acting comeback with soap opera Nand replacing Faiza Hasan who previously played the antagonist in it.

In 2022, she played a strict Punjabi housewife in Hum TV's Ramadan special Paristan alongside an ensemble cast, in which her performance was met with mostly negative reviews due to the incorrect Punjabi dialect.

In 2023, Saud's performance as a outspoken and cunning daughter-in-law in soap opera Baby Baji bajjo and mohabbat satrungi and mohabbat aur mehngai was well-received by critics and audience.

== Personal life ==
Javeria has been married to actor Saud since 2005. She has two children. She belong to a Saraiki family from Dera Ghazi Khan.

== Filmography ==
=== Television serials ===
Year	Title	Role	Screenwriter	Producer	Lyricist	Network	Notes
1997	Tipu Sultan: The Tiger Lord	Sareeta				PTV	
2000	Ab Yeh Mumkin Nahi	Sakina				PTV	
2002	Thori Khushi Thora Ghum	Rubina				PTV	
2004	Ana					Geo Entertainment	
2008	Yeh Zindagi Hai	Jamila / Chameli	Yes	Yes	Yes	Geo Entertainment	
2009	Yeh Kaisi Mohabbat Hai	Haseena			Yes	Geo Entertainment	
2011	Khuda Aur Muhabbat	No		Yes	Yes	Geo Entertainment	
2012	Pak Villa	Laila	Yes	Yes	Yes	Geo Entertainment	
2012	Jeena Seekha Do Hamein	No		Yes	Yes	Geo Entertainment	
2017	Mohabbat Zindagi Hai	No	Yes	Yes	Yes	Express Entertainment	
2020	Nand	Gohar				ARY Digital	
2021	Oye Motti	Saira				Express Entertainment	Episodic appearance
2022	Paristan	Haseena				Hum TV	
2022	Betiyaan	Naghma				ARY Digital	
2023	Sar-e-Rah	Nudrat				ARY Digital	
2023	Baby Baji	Azra				ARY Digital	
2024	Baby Baji Ki Bahuwain	Azra				ARY Digital	
2024	Mohabbat Satrangi	Husn Ara	Yes		Yes	Green Entertainment	
2024	Mohabbat Aur Mehangai	Sitara	Yes	Yes	Yes	Green Entertainment	
2024	Bajjo	Musarrat / Bajjo	Yes		Yes	Geo Entertainment	
2025	Pyara Ramzan	(Host)				Express Entertainment	Ramadan show
2025	Bahar Nagar	Nargis				Geo Entertainment	

=== Webseries ===
Year	Title	Role	Notes	Ref.
2020	Aurat Gardi	Shabnam Bibi	Released on Urduflix	
