= Nehar =

Pakistani television series

- Urdu: نیہر
- Genre: Drama
- Written by: Soofia Khurram
- Directed by: Choudhury Ali Hassan
- Starring: Osama Tahir; Saboor Aly; Areeba Habib; Shafaat Ali
- Country of origin: Pakistan
- Original language: Urdu
- No. of episodes: 26

Production
- Producer: Momina Duraid
- Production locations: Karachi; Lahore
- Production company: MD Productions

Original release
- Network: HUM TV
- Release: 9 May – 16 August 2022

Nehar (Urdu: نیہر), is a 2022 Pakistani television drama aired by Hum TV. Written by Soofia Khurram, directed by Choudhury Ali Hassan, and produced by Momina Duraid under their banner MD Productions, the series features Osama Tahir, Saboor Aly, Areeba Habib and Shafaat Ali.

== Plot ==
The show starts with a family mourning their loss of their daughter, Tooba, who was murdered by her in-laws including her husband Mazhar, her mother-in-law Ishrat, and her sister-in-law Mehwish. Mazhar and his family are part of the dowry business, so after Tooba's death, they find Komal. Komal's family includes her sister Anmol, her father Kabir, her mother Ghazala and her cousin Adeel.

After Mazhar and Komal marry, Kabir's sister Zohra asks Kabir for Anmol to marry her son Arsalan, after Arsalan gives the suggestion that they will become rich if he marries Anmol, even though Anmol loves Adeel. Adeel also becomes engaged to Arsalan's sister Erum, since Erum likes Adeel but he doesn't want to marry now. Anmol starts a job after she marries Arsalan. After Anmol keeps defying her family and keeps talking back to them, Zohra wonders if she made a mistake having Anmol and Arsalan marry.

At her job, Anmol meets Batool, and she becomes friends with her. But, unbeknownst to Anmol, Batool is the sister of Tooba, Mazhar's ex-wife who he murdered. Arsalan becomes involved in an illegal card game, and when he keeps losing, he has to pay them 9 lakh rupee. So, he lies to Anmol saying he needs money for a new import and export business he is starting but Anmol thinks he just wants money for something else and doesn't give him money. The leader of the card game, Sultan, comes to Arsalan's home and tells his family about 9 lakh rupee loan that he has to pay because of losing in cards and he leaves.

When Arsalan comes home, Zohra slaps him and, in anger, Arsalan goes to Sultan to ask him why Sultan went to his house. But, on the way back, they plan to steal Arsalan's car and leave him stranded on the road. But, when Arsalan refuses to leave, Sultan's man accidentally shoots Arsalan and they run away in the car, leaving Arsalan shot on the ground. In the morning, the police come to Arsalan's home and gives Zohra his clothes and he tells his family that Arsalan has died and they found his body on the street.

So Anmol goes to identify the body, and at his funeral, Ishrat walks by, and when she sees Batool, she runs away. She tells Mazhar this and they wonder what relationship Batool has with Komal's family. After Komal gives birth to a boy named Saud, Mazhar and Ishrat try to burn her in the kitchen but the neighbors see this and Komal is brought to the hospital. When Anmol shows Batool pictures of Komal, Saud and Mazhar, Batool tells Anmol about Mazhar's evil past. Once the police becomes involved and Anmol arrives to the hospital, Mazhar and Ishrat take Saud and escape.

Anmol starts an online campaign for people to fight against dowry, which is called "#JusticeForKomal", receives much support. Mazhar and Ishrat give Saud to an unknown person, so they can get some money to go somewhere else. After Mazhar and Ishrat rest at Mehwish's house, she expels them since she doesn't want to be caught with them because of her husband catching them. But, after they leave, Mehwish is arrested anyway. Soon, Mazhar and Ishrat are both arrested and Anmol hires a lawyer to fight Mazhar in court.

Saud is left on a bridge by the woman who had him, which Anmol and Adeel see, so they get Saud and bring him back home to Komal. At court, the lawyer puts all the evidence against Mazhar, and bring in Batool and Kabir as witnesses. After that, Mazhar is sentenced to death by hanging and Ishrat is sentenced to life in jail. When Mazhar asks to see Ishrat before the hanging, Ishrat refuses to see him.

Zohra goes to Kabir, admitting her mistake, and asks for Anmol and Adeel to get married. Erum arrives, when Adeel tells her that he doesn't like her, then she leaves in anger, although Zohra convinces Erum to move on. As time goes on, everyone is shown to be happy, with Saud now a toddler. The show ends with the message of not falling for dowry and making right choices so no regret comes later on.

== Cast ==
- Osama Tahir as Adeel
- Areeba Habib as Komal
- Saboor Aly as Anmol: Komal's sister
- Farhan Ally Agha as Kabir: Komal's father
- Saima Qureshi as Ghazala: Komal's mother
- Shafaat Ali as Mazhar
- Munazzah Arif as Ishrat: Mazhar's mother
- Inaya Khan as Mehwish: Mazhar's sister
- Umer Aalam as Arsalan
- Rabia Noreen as Zohra: Arsalan's mother
- Angeline Malik

== Production ==
In September 2021, DAWN Images reported that Areeba Habib, Saboor Aly, Osama Tahir and Syed Shafaat Ali will play the leading role in MD Productions' Nehar which will tackle the issue of dowry, and will be directed by Ali Hassan. Habib revealed in an interview that she signed the series after rejecting 15–16 scripts because after working in Jalan, she was receiving the scripts similar to that role.

== Reception ==
Brandsynario praised the series for tackling multiple issues such as dowry and violence against women. Oyeyeah gave it 3.5 out of 5 stars.
