= Amanat (2021 TV series) =

Pakistani drama television serial

- Title card
- Genre: Drama
- Written by: Rukhsana Nigar
- Directed by: Shahid Shafaat
- Starring: Imran Abbas; Urwa Hocane; Saboor Aly; Babar Ali; Haroon Shahid; Gohar Rasheed
- Country of origin: Pakistan
- Original language: Urdu
- No. of episodes: 32

Production
- Producers: Samina Humayun Saeed, Sana Shahnawaz, Humayun Saeed
- Production companies: Next Level Entertainment; Six Sigma Plus

Original release
- Network: ARY Digital
- Release: 21 September 2021 – 26 April 2022

Amanat (meaning trust or fidelity in Urdu) is a 2021 Pakistani television series produced by Samina Humayun Saeed and Sana Shahnawaz under the banner of Next Level Entertainment in collaboration with Six Sigma Plus. It features Imran Abbas, Urwa Hocane, and Saboor Aly in lead roles and Haroon Shahid, Srha Asghar and Gohar Rasheed in supporting roles. It airs weekly on ARY Digital starting from its premier on 21 September 2021 till 26 April 2022.

== Plot ==
Zaraar and Zunaira are in love and about to be married. Zaraar's sister Samra and Zunaira's brother Raheel are married and for awaiting rukhsati. Zunaira is a spoilt brat and a pampered child. She is spoiled by her family and does not care about anyone but herself. Only Zaraar can handle Zooni's mood swings. Firdous worries about Samra hence keeps Zooni happy.

Mehar is in college and only 2 exams are left. But her uncle does not let her go to give exam as he says that being his niece is enough for her. Her auntie insists her uncle but he does not oblige in fact and arranges his mentally disabled son Qaiser's marriage with Mehar. Her auntie does not want this to happen and thinks of an alternative solution. Her nephew Fawad visits the house and agrees to marry Mehar. After they quickly get married, the couple runs away from Mehar's uncle. Fawad turns to his college friend Zaraar for help.

Years ago on the way to give their exam, Zaraar hits a kid by mistake with Fawad sitting in the back seat. They take the kid to the hospital as she is injured. While waiting for the parents of the kid to arrive Fawad asks Zaraar to leave as they both had an exam to sit, saying he will handle everything. Zaraar feels indebted to him as he saved his career.

Fawad turns up at Zaraar's place which his company allotted to him in Islamabad. Fawad goes to the market to buy credit for his phone number. There some mobile snatchers see him, take his phone and murder him using a gun.

Zaraar looks for him everywhere but cannot find him. Next day is his mehendi so he takes Mehar with him to Karachi as he considers her his responsibility now. Zunaira and her family doubt Mehar and his relationship. Meanwhile Zaraar gets to know that Fawad has died. Zaraar's brother Junaid also creates misunderstandings between Zaraar and Meher. On the day of the wedding, Meher's uncle arrives at the venue and tries to take her with him. Zaraar tells him that he is married to Meher. Malik shoots at Meher. Zaraar takes her to the hospital. The guests leave. Zuneira's family says they will not take Samra with them. Junaid comes forward to marry Zunaira. Zunaira agrees to marry Junaid with ulterior motives.

Safdar hears Zaraar and Mehar talk and finally everyone gets to know that they are not married and do not have an affair. Safdar gets them married anyhow. Zuneira keeps on insulting Samra, Mehar, Junaid and Firdous. She manipulates her family and Junaid. Samra is pregnant. She falsely blames Junaid of beating her in front of the entire family. Junaid gets to know her truth. Mehar and Zaraar starts to love each other. Mehar is pregnant. Zuneira befriends her and takes her to her doctor friend and gives her wrong medicines. Junaid gets to know about the wrong medicines and confronts her. Junaid also changes Mehar's medicines. Zuniera creates misunderstanding in the family regarding Junaid and Mehar. She tricks Mehar into going to Junaid's room when everyone including Samr and Raheel are present. Then she creates a scene. Zaraar does not trust Mehar. Junaid runs out of the house when no one listens to him. Firdous throws Mehar out of the house. Mehar runs into the doctor and calls her aunt and goes home. Zuneira tries to get Zaraar's sympathy. Junaid stays in a hotel overnight. He runs into a female friend outside and she decides to help him get settled in UK and get a job. Zuneira keeps portraying herself as helpless to gain Zaraar's sympathy. Mehar faints and gets to know about her pregnancy. Raheel asks Junaid to divorce Zuneira. Fearing for herself and the baby, Samra faints is taken to the hospital. Saeeda takes Mehar to Zaraar to talk to him but Zuneira does not let her meet him and tells her that the baby will be proof that she is characterless. Zuneira finds UK visa and creates a scene. Junaid falls in love with his old friend named Laiba and marries her without telling anyone. Qaiser is unconscious in his room and is taken to the hospital as soon as possible. However, he passes away and his mother Syeda blames Malik Furqan for the sudden death.

A few months later, Junaid and Laiba are living in London where no one from Junaids family answers their constant calls. Samra has a son named Talha and is still living in her parents' house as Raheel would not take her home. Mehar gives birth to her and Zaraar's son. Zaraar's mother brings Mehar in the house. Zaraar and Mehar reconcile. Zooni's dad dies, and her mother goes to live with Samra and Raheel in Dubai for some time. Alone in the house, Zooni loses all sense and runs out in the street only to come in front of a car and dies on spot.

== Cast ==
- Imran Abbas as Zaraar Hussain, Male Protagonist. Elder Son of Safdar and Firdous, Brother of Junaid and Samrah, Husband of Mehar.
- Urwa Hocane as Mehar Zaraar, Female Protagonist. Wife of Zaraar, and widowed of Fawad and Niece of Malik Furqan.
- Saboor Aly as Zunaira Abid, Main Antagonist. Spoiled Daughter of Abid and Salma, Sister of Raheel and past love of Zaraar who marries his (Zaraar) brother Junaid to take revenge with Zaraar and Mehar. Divorced from Junaid
- Haroon Shahid as Junaid Hussain, Side Protagonist. But was Jealous of Zaraar, Younger Son of Safdar and Firdous, Brother of Zaraar and Samrah, EX Husband of Zunera. Now married to Laiba
- Gohar Rasheed as Malik Khaysar, Mentally disturbed person and only son of Malik Furqan. He wishes to marry Mehar. (Dead)
- Babar Ali as Malik Furqan, A Powerful Landlord, Uncle of Mehar, Father of Malik Khaysar and Husband of Saeeda Begum.
- Saima Qureshi as Saeeda Begum, Wife of Malik Furqan and Aunt of Mehar
- Salman Saeed as Raheel Abid, Son of Salma and Abid, Brother of Zunera and Husband of Samrah.
- Srha Asgar as Samrah, Sister of Zaraar and Junaid, Daughter of Safdar and Firdous, wife of Raheel
- Shehryar Zaidi as Safdar Hussain, Father of Zaraar, Junaid and Samrah.
- Saba Hameed as Firdous, Mother of Zaraar, Junaid and Samrah.
- Tara Mahmood as Salma, Mother of Zunera and Raheel. Wife of Abid
- Asad Siddiqui as Fawad (Cameo) Dead & Mehar Husband
- Raja Haider as Abid, Father of Zunera and Raheel. Husband of Salma. Dead
- Faiza Khan as Laiba Junaid, 2nd Wife of Junaid & Daughter in law of Firdous and Safdar.
- Faysal Shahzad as Allah Bakhsh (Malik Furqan Loyal servant).

== Production ==
In October 2020, producers Samina Humayun Saeed and Sana Shahnawaz revealed the cast and other details of their upcoming project. The serial is directed by Shahid Shafat and written by Rukhsana Nigar, and is their second collaboration after Lamha Lamha Zindagi (2010).
