= Laa (TV serial) =

- Title screen
- Genre: Serial drama Romance; Social stratification Spiritual
- Written by: Sarmad Sehbai
- Directed by: Farooq Rind
- Starring: Meekal Zulfiqar; Sadia Khan; Sabreen Hisbani; Saiqa
- Theme music composer: Waqas Azeem
- Opening theme: "Hai Ishq Ki Pehli Manzil Laa" by Javed Bashir
- Composer: Sahir Ali Bagga
- Country of origin: Pakistan
- Original language: Urdu
- No. of episodes: 13

Production
- Producers: Momina Duraid; Kashif A. Khan
- Production locations: Lahore; Sheikhupura
- Cinematography: Nadeem Kashmiri
- Editors: Sheraz Fayaz; Afzal Fayaz
- Camera setup: Multi-camera setup
- Running time: 35 - 40 minutes

Original release
- Network: Hum TV
- Release: 7 June – 30 August 2014

Laa (Urdu: لا, Arabic: لاء, lit. 'No') is a Pakistani drama serial written by Sarmad Sehbai, directed by Farooq Rind and produced by Momina Duraid. It stars Meekal Zulfiqar, Sadia Khan and Sabreen Hisbani in lead roles. The serial aired on Saturday evenings on Hum TV.

== Plot ==
The story revolves around Daniyal Malik, a rich and humble person who has bet his friends that he would make Naina Syed fall in love with him during her stay at Daniyal's house with her family. The story then takes a turn when Daniyal discovers his past. Naimat Khan, informs him that he's adopted. He finds out that the parents he's living with are not his real parents. He was given to them, because his dad couldn't take care of him because of his step-mother. The marriage was kept secret, that's why Daniyal's mother had to sacrifice his son and leave him.

Daniyal goes to search for his birth parents and finally meets a man who is aware of the truth. It is later revealed that Naimat Khan was his dad's servant and wanted to take revenge and that is why he had approached Daniyal. Naimat Khan's daughter was murdered by Daniyal's step mother and Naimat Khan wanted Daniyal to take revenge from his half brother, Dilawar. His step family was very rich but it was Naimat Khan's wish that Daniyal takes over his dad's place as peer and not Dilawar. However, Dilawar gets to know the truth and finds out that Daniyal is his half brother and is about to kill him but a lady instead takes the bullet. That lady is a good friend of Daniyal's real mother, who is also a lawyer. Meanwhile, Daniyal is sent to prison because the police thinks it is him who tried killing the girl. Daniyal's mother takes up his case and helps him in getting out of prison. Naina helps him too. Later, the lady who took the bullet, gains consciousness and declares that Daniyal did not shoot her. She also says that she is Daniyal's mother. She knew the truth, just when Dilawar shot her. However, whilst knowing the truth she gets so shocked and overwhelmed with emotions, because she thought Daniyal was dead. She approaches Daniyal and tells him the truth. Daniyal is happy, but then he decides to live with his foster parents instead of his birth mother since they took care of him and have always been there for him.

== Cast ==
- Mikaal Zulfiqar as Daniyal Malik
- Qavi Khan as Daniyal's father
- Saiqa as Zareena (Daniyal's mother)
- Seemi Raheel as Naina's mother
- Naeem Tahir as Naina's father
- Khalid Malik as Dilawar Shah
- Sadia Khan as Naina Syed
- Rehan Sheikh as Naimat Khan
- Mehreen as Sohai
- Rabia Noreen as Sanam
- Sabreen Hisbani as Leyla
- Laila Zuberi
- Ali Saqi
- Ashraf Rehman
- Xile Huma
- Shamaa Asif
- Almaas Butt

== Soundtrack ==
Laa - Original Soundtrack (OST)

Soundtrack album by Javed Bashir
- Released: 2014
- Recorded: 2014
- Genre: Theme song, television soundtrack
- Length: 1:50
- Language: Urdu
- Label: Hum TV
- Producer: Momina Duraid

The theme song of Laa was written by Sarmad Sehbai and composed by Sahir Ali Bagga, while the background score was composed by Waqas Azeem. The song was sung by Javed Bashir.

=== Track listing ===
All lyrics are written by Sarmad Sehbai; all music is composed by Sahir Ali Bagga.

No.	Title	Artist(s)	Length
1.	"Hai Ishq Ki Pehli Manzil Laa..Dil-e-Ma..."	Javed Bashir	1:50

== See also ==
- List of Pakistani television serials
