= Azad (2017 film) =

- Urdu: آزاد
- Directed by: Rehan Sheikh
- Written by: Rehan Sheikh
- Screenplay by: Rehan Sheikh
- Produced by: Rehan Sheikh; Hasan Naeem
- Starring: Sabreen Hisbani; Imran Abbas; Sanam Saeed; Rehan Sheikh; Nimra Bucha; Angeline Malik; Zahid Ahmed; Salman Shahid
- Cinematography: Ilyas Kashmiri
- Edited by: Yasir Nawaz
- Music by: Abbas Ali Khan; Taimoor Mirza
- Production companies: HBO Films; Bling Studios; Roomi Films
- Distributed by: HBO; Hum Films
- Release dates: 15 December 2017 (South Asian International Film Festival); 9 February 2018 (Pakistan)
- Running time: 121 min
- Country: Pakistan
- Language: Urdu

Azad (lit. Independent) is a 2017 melodrama film directed and written by Rehan Sheikh, who co-produced with Hasan Naeem under the production banner of Bling Studios and Roomi Films. The film features Sabreen Hisbani, Sanam Saeed, Salman Shahid, Rehan Sheikh, Nimra Bucha and Zahid Ahmed, and Sajjad Kishwar. The cast also includes debutants Ajlal Shah and Jawad Rana. A special appearance is also made by Angeline Malik, Imran Abbas and Schumaila Hussain.

== Cast ==
- Rehan Sheikh
- Salman Shahid
- Sanam Saeed
- Sabreen Hisbani
- Nimra Bucha
- Ajlal Shah
- Zahid Ahmed
- Jawad Rana
- Sajjad Kishwar
- Angeline Malik (special appearance)
- Imran Abbas as Faris (special appearance)
- Schumaila Hussain (special appearance)

== Production ==
=== Marketing ===
The first teaser of the film was released in September 2015. The second teaser was released in December 2015 by Bling Studios on Vimeo. It had its world premiere on 15 December 2017, in HBO's South Asian International Film Festival.

== Soundtrack ==
The music of the film is composed by Taimoor Mirza and the background score is given by Abbas Ali Khan.

== Release ==
The film was released in cinemas across Pakistan on 9 February 2018. On 15 December 2017, the film along with 2017's Na Maloom Afraad 2 had its screened at the South Asian International Film Festival 2017.

== See also ==
- List of Pakistani films of 2018
