= Saima Qureshi =

Pakistani actress (born 1978)

- Born: Saima Qureshi; 8 November 1978 (age 47); Karachi, Sindh, Pakistan
- Education: University of Karachi
- Occupations: Actress, Model
- Years active: 1995 – present
- Children: Daniyal Khan (son)
- Parent(s): Rozina (mother); Riffat Qureshi (father)
- Relatives: Afshan Qureshi (aunt); Abid Qureshi (uncle); Faysal Quraishi (cousin)

Saima Qureshi (born 8 November 1978) is a Pakistani actress. She is known for her roles in dramas Amanat, Bandhay Aik Dor Say, Nand, Deewar-e-Shab and Ishq Hai.

== Early life ==
Saima was born on 8 November 1978 in Karachi, Pakistan. She completed her early education in Karachi and graduated from University of Karachi. Saima's mother Rozina was a film actress and her father Riffat Qureshi was a sound specialist of movies.

== Career ==
Saima made her debut as an actress on PTV (Pakistan Television) in the 1995. She was noted for her roles in dramas Harjaee, Chahatein, Tujh Pe Qurban, Mann Ka Bhanwar, Talluq and Dil Ki Dehleez Par. Then she also appeared in dramas Jithani, Khushboo Ka Ghar, Tootay Huway Taray, Cheekh, Deewar-e-Shab and Choti Choti Batain. Since then she has appeared in dramas Resham Gali Ki Husna, Nand, Bandhay Aik Dor Say, Ek Jhoota Lafz Mohabbat, Ishq Hai and Amanat.

== Personal life ==
Saima's aunt Afshan Qureshi is an actress and her uncle Abid Qureshi was an actor as is her cousin Faysal Quraishi.

== Filmography ==
=== Television ===
Year	Title	Role	Network
1997	Tasveer	Zari	PTV
2000	Harjaee	Romel	Indus TV
2003	Sunehri Zanjir	Nigar	PTV
2005	Bandish	Aapa	ARY Digital
2006	Bushra Bushra	Herself	Indus TV
2006	Chahatein	Ruby	PTV
2007	Mann Ka Bhanwar	Rabia	A-Plus
2007	Sharbati	Tara	PTV
2008	Talluq	Radia	Geo TV
2009	Tujh Pe Qurban	Shela	ARY Digital
2010	Dil Ki Dehleez Par	Sidra	PTV
2011	Meri Wife Kay Liye	Bibi	TV One
2012	Khushboo Ka Ghar	Shaila	ARY Digital
2013	Jeena To Yahi Hai	Husna	ARY Digital
2013	Tootay Huway Taray	Suraiyya	ARY Digital
2014	Marium Kaisay Jiye	Sadia	ARY Digital
2015	Yeh Mera Deewanapan Hai	Rakshanda	A-Plus
2016	Socha Na Tha	Kubra	ARY Digital
2017	Jithani	Iffat	Hum TV
2018	Kuch Is Tarah	Shahnaz	PTV
2019	Yateem	Mary	A-Plus
2019	Wafa Kar Chalay	Sadia	Hum TV
2019	Meri Baji	Nasreen	ARY Digital
2019	Cheekh	Shamsa	ARY Digital
2019	Choti Choti Batain	Nayla	Hum TV
2019	Deewar-e-Shab	Shaista	Hum TV
2019	Resham Gali Ki Husna	Razia	Hum TV
2020	Makafaat Season 2	Samina	Geo TV
2020	Humraaz	Arshi	Apna Channel
2020	Bandhay Aik Dor Say	Zubeida	Geo Entertainment
2020	Nand	Naima	ARY Digital
2021	Dikhawa Season 2	Ifrah	Geo Entertainment
2021	Iman Aur Yaqeen	Hina Aslam	Aaj Entertainment
2021	Juda Huay Kuch Is Tarha	Maria	Hum TV
2021	Ek Jhoota Lafz Mohabbat	Shazia	Express Entertainment
2021	Ishq Hai	Saba	ARY Digital
2021	Amanat	Saeeda	ARY Digital
2022	Roag	Qamar Jahan	Hum TV
2022	Nisa	Naheed	Geo TV
2022	Mamlaat	Saira	Geo TV
2022	Paristan	Rukhsar	Hum TV
2022	Nehar	Ghazala	Hum TV
2022	Ant Ul Hayat	Fatima	Hum TV
2023	Dolly Ki Super Family	Dolly	PTV
2023	Aitraaf	Fatima	Aan TV
2023	Nikah	Raina	Geo Entertainment
2023	Kitni Girhain Baqi Hain	Sakina	Hum TV
2023	Ab Meri Bari	Arzoo	Aan TV
2023	Motia Sarkar	Aasha Bai	TV One
2023	Mera Susraal	Sara	Aan TV
2023	Nijaat	Farhat	Hum TV
2023	Baylagaam	Afshan	Geo Entertainment
2024	Yaar-e-Mann	Ishrat	Green Entertainment
2024	Ishq Beparwah	Shabana	Green Entertainment
2024	DuniyaPur	Bakhtawar	Green Entertainment
2025	Aik Lafz Zindagi	Afiya	Geo Entertainment
2025	Haya	Aasiya	Geo Entertainment
2025	Chaalbaaz	Zarina	ARY Digital
2025	Sazawaar	Rehana	ARY Digital
2026	Ghulam Bashah Sundri	Lajo	Green Entertainment
2026	Jahannum Ba'raasta Jannat	Shaheena Bibi	Green Entertainment

=== Telefilm ===
Year	Title	Role
2010	Firon	Reena
2020	Dr. Balma	Mehreen's aunt
2020	Ishq Achanak	Saira
2021	Pyar Kay Lashkaray	Riffat
2022	Chand Si Dulhan	Durdana
2022	Mera Pehla Pyar	Tahira

=== Film ===
Year	Title	Role
2004	Hum Ek Hain	Bilqis
2004	Sold Unborn	Nazo
2018	Welcome to New York	Journalist
