= Yaar-e-Bewafa =

2017 Pakistani television series

- Genre: Romantic; Drama
- Written by: Mohsin Ali
- Directed by: Zeeshan Ahmed
- Starring: Imran Abbas; Sarah Khan; Arij Fatyma; Salim Mairaj
- Opening theme: Tum Kya Jaanu Yaar e Bewafa By Imran Abbas
- Original language: Urdu
- No. of episodes: 25

Production
- Running time: approx 40 mins
- Production company: Showcase Productions

Original release
- Network: Geo TV
- Release: 6 July – 21 December 2017

Yaar-e-Bewafa (Urdu: یار بے وفا, lit. 'Disloyal Friend') is a Pakistani romantic drama serial written by Mohsin Ali, which aired on Geo Entertainment in 2017. It stars Imran Abbas, Sarah Khan and Arij Fatyma in lead roles. The series is about the struggles of a middle-class family.

Produced by Wajahat Rauf and Shazia Wajahat under Showcase Productions, the series directed by Zeeshan Ahmed.

== Synopsis ==
Every human heart is chasing after its wishes and to achieve good things in life. Drama serial Yaar-e-Bewafa is also focusing on the issue that how selfish a person can behave, when they get a little hope for the better future, even they forget their present belongings and relationships. This play revolves around two different families which will connect each other with the progression of events.

Zaid is living with his mother, wife and a son. His mother raised him with much suffering and many difficulties after the death of his father. She made sure about his quality studies despite their financial problems. Zaid met his wife (Fizza) at university and they fell in love with each other. Fizza belongs to a rich family while Zaid is just a white collar-guy. Fizza's parent opposes her below standard choice and discontinues their connection with her after wedding.

Another dimension of the play is Saleem's family, who live with his wife (Amna) and a son. He is kind of short-tempered, truculent and works in a chemical factory. Once he gets ill and after a complete diagnosis, shocking news reveals that he is suffering from lungs cancer. Now Amna faces financial crises due to Saleem's illness.

The fate brings another woman in Zaid's life after the departure of Fiza. They both develop strong bonding, affection and soft corners for each other. Fizza who is busy in collecting materialistic happiness for her, seems like she is losing them forever.

Is it a sensible act to value our future happiness while ignoring present happiness?

== Cast ==
- Imran Abbas as Zayd Ahmed
- Arij Fatyma as Fizza Zayd
- Sarah Khan as Amna Salim (first marriage with Salim); Amna Zayd (second marriage with Zayd)
- Saleem Mairaj as Salim Munawwar
- Samina Ahmad as Humaira
- Ray Khan As Neelam
- Saad Fareedi as Zain
- Tahir Jatao as Mr. Kamal
- Birjees Farooqui as Mrs. Kamal
- Mehboob Sultan as Mr. Rashid
- Haneef Bachan as Boss
- Munnazah Motiwala as Sarah
- Farah Zeba as Khala
- Surooj Afaq as Jameela
- Syed Sajid Ali as Khaloo
- Faisal Bali as Saleem's Friend
- Sharjeel Khan as Mechanic
- Dr. Kashif Malik as Humaira's Doctor
- Ikhyar Khan as Dr. Asadullah Hussaini
- Fida Daar as Zaid's Wakeel
- Bawa Jee as Saith Sahab
- Falak Shahzad (Child Star) as Umar Ahmed
- Aaliyan Wasiq (Child Star) as Ahmed Husayn

== Soundtrack ==
The original soundtrack of Yaar-e-Bewafa is composed and sung by Imran Abbas, the lead actor of the drama serial. The lyrics are penned down by Ahmed Faraz.
