= Nand (TV series) =

Pakistani television soap series

- Title card
- Genre: Family drama Soap opera
- Written by: Samina Ijaz
- Directed by: Syed Zeeshan Ali Zaidi
- Starring: Faiza Hasan; Javeria Saud; Aijaz Aslam; Shahroz Sabzwari
- Theme music composer: SK Salman Khan; Deniss Tanveer; Sk Studio
- Opening theme: Soya Hai Naseeba Rabba by Sanam Marvi
- Composer: SK Salman Khan
- Country of origin: Pakistan
- Original language: Urdu
- No. of seasons: 1
- No. of episodes: 146

Production
- Producer: Fahad Mustafa
- Production location: Karachi
- Camera setup: Multi-camera setup
- Production company: Big Bang Entertainment

Original release
- Network: ARY Digital
- Release: August 4, 2020 – April 13, 2021

Nand (Urdu: نند, lit. 'Sister-in-law') is a Pakistani soap series aired on ARY Digital from 4 August 2020 to 13 April 2021. It is produced by Fahad Mustafa under Big Bang Entertainment. It stars Javeria Saud, Minal Khan, Aijaz Aslam Shahroz Sabzwari and Faiza Hasan.

== Plot ==
Nand is a drama surrounded by emotions. The story revolves around family issues. Gohar is the nand of Rabi. Saqib is the younger brother of Gohar and the husband of Rabi. Gohar cannot stand Rabi in her brother's life. She creates issues in their married life. Jahangir is the brother-in-law of Saqib and husband of Gohar that later marries Rabi.

== Cast ==
- Faiza Hasan/Javeria Saud as Gohar
- Minal Khan as Rabi
- Shehroz Sabzwari as Saqib
- Aijaz Aslam as Jahangir
- Sumbul Shahid as Nasreen (Late)
- Ayaz Samoo as Hasan
- Minsa Malik as Afshan
- Aamna Malick as Gul Rukh, Hasan's second wife
- Sabiha Hashmi as Jahangir's mother, Rabi's mother-in-law
- Saima Qureshi as Naima, Gul Rukh's mother
- Tipu Shareef as Rabi's brother (dead)
- Mehwish Qureshi as Muneeza Bhabhi, Rabi's sister-in-law
- Maha Hasan as Farwa, Hasan's ex-wife
- Hamzah Tariq Jamil as Shahzaib
- Mahrunisa Iqbal as Sundas
- Anosha Ali as Ramsha
- Nabeela Khan as Amna, Sundas's mother
- Kamran Jilani as Dilawar Ali Shah, Gohar's husband
- Mirza Rizwan Nabi as Khurram, Sundus's husband
- Abduallah Khan as Manager, Hasan's friend
- Qamar Raza as Rab Nawaz

== Production ==
Previously titled Rishton Ki Zanjeer, the serial was first announced by Khan through her instagram account in February 2020.

The television series was first planned to be a 30 episode finite series and was supposed to air on the 8PM prime time slot but few months before airing the channel shifted the serial to a Soap drama airing 4 days a week (Mon-Thurs 7PM).

The first teaser of the series was released on 25 July 2020.

Due to extraordinary response, the serial was extended and the cast came back to shooting to start the extension storyline. However, Faiza Hassan quit the series and then the makers decided to call her for a small cameo role to grandly end her role. Faiza Hassan was later replaced by Javeria Saud, who played Nand in the extension storyline. Minal Khan also quit the serial due to her father's death but her character wasn't replaced, it was simply sidelined.

In March 2021, it was announced that the series will go off air before Ramadan 2021 and the last episode will be air on 13 April 2021.

== Reception ==
Nand opened up with average ratings around 2.5 but soon increased to 4.0. Gradually, the ratings increased and had reached TRPs of 10 and higher. It was also criticised for its over-melodramatic story and re-entry of the main protagonist after plastic surgery.

The high ratings continued for the serial in 2020 and early 2021, however in February 2021 ratings declined slowly due to excessive dragging in the storyline but the serial still managed to keep its position as slot leader.

== Awards and nominations ==
=== Lux Style Awards ===
| Ceremony | Categories | Recipients | Result |
|---|---|---|---|
| 21st Lux Style Awards | Best TV Long Play | Nand | Nominated |

=== ARY People's Choice Awards ===
| Date of ceremony | Award | Category | Recipient(s) and nominee(s) | Result | References |
|---|---|---|---|---|---|
| March 2021 | ARY People's Choice Awards | Favorite Drama Serial- Long Format | Nand | Nominated | |
| March 2021 | ARY People's Choice Awards | Favorite Director | Syed Zeeshan Ali | Nominated | |
| March 2021 | ARY People's Choice Awards | Favorite Writer | Samina Ejaz | Nominated | |
| March 2021 | ARY People's Choice Awards | Favorite Actor | Aijaz Aslam | Nominated | |
| March 2021 | ARY People's Choice Awards | Favorite Actor in a role of Baap | Aijaz Aslam | Nominated | |
| March 2021 | ARY People's Choice Awards | Favorite Actress | Faiza Hasan | Nominated | |
| March 2021 | ARY People's Choice Awards | Favorite Actor in a role of Nand | Faiza Hasan | Nominated | |
| March 2021 | ARY People's Choice Awards | Favorite Actor in a role of Wife | Minal Khan | Nominated | |
| March 2021 | ARY People's Choice Awards | Favorite Actor in a role of Bhabhi | Minal Khan | Won | |
| March 2021 | ARY People's Choice Awards | Favorite Actor in a role of Bahu | Minal Khan | Nominated | |
| March 2021 | ARY People's Choice Awards | Favorite Actor in a role of Bhai | Shehroz Sabzwari | Nominated | |
| March 2021 | ARY People's Choice Awards | Favorite Actor in a role of Husband | Shehroz Sabzwari | Nominated | |
| March 2021 | ARY People's Choice Awards | Favorite Emerging Talent (Female) | Maha Hasan | Nominated | |
| March 2021 | ARY People's Choice Awards | Favorite Emerging Talent (Male) | Hamza Tariq Jamil | Nominated | |
