= Hammad Shoaib =

Pakistani actor

- Born: Hammad Shoaib; 28 June 1997 (age 29); Faisalabad, Pakistan
- Education: Lahore Grammar School
- Occupations: Actor; Model; Dancer
- Years active: 2017–present
- Parent: Ayesha Shoaib (mother)
- Relatives: Saad Shoaib Bashir (brother)

Hammad Shoaib is a Pakistani television actor. His notable performances include the drama Soteli Maamta, Ishq Hai, Pardes, Shehnai and Chaudhry and Sons.

== Filmography ==
=== Television series ===
Year	Title	Role	Channel	Ref
2017	Adhi Gawahi	Hammad	Hum TV	
2018	Khidmat Guzar	Shuja	A-Plus	
2018	Noor Bibi	Aman	Geo Entertainment	
2019	Mutthi Bhar Chahat	Zain	Express Entertainment	
2019	Deewar-e-Shab	Nabeel	Hum TV	
2020	Soteli Maamta	Mahaz	Hum TV	
2020	Zebaish	Dilawar	Hum TV	
2021	Shehnai	Hunain	ARY Digital	
2021	Pardes	Salman	ARY Digital	
2021	Ishq Hai	Haris	ARY Digital	
2022	Mamlaat	Sharjeel	Geo Entertainment	
2022	Chaudhry and Sons	Shoaib	Geo Entertainment	
2022	Saaya 2	Arib	Geo TV	
2022	Hasrat	Saim	Hum TV	
2022	Kaisi Teri Khudgharzi	Ahsan	ARY Digital	
2023	Dil Hi Tou Hai	Sarmad	ARY Digital	
2023	Maa Nahi Saas Hoon Main	Salman	Geo Entertainment	
2024	Tum Bin Kesay Jiyen	Adeel	ARY Digital	
2024	Nadaan	Dr. Osama	Hum TV	
2025	Main Zameen Tu Aasmaan	Akbar	Green Entertainment	
2025	Chaalbaaz	Ashir	ARY Digital	

=== Telefilm ===
Year	Title	Role	Notes
2021	Uff Yeh Biwiyan	Ohn	
2021	Hangor S-131	Fasih Bukhari	
