= Mujhe Kucch Kehna Hai (TV series) =

Pakistani television series

- Urdu: مجھے کچھ کہنا ہے
- Written by: Nusrat Jabeen
- Directed by: Shahood Alvi
- Starring: Shahood Alvi; Sabreen Hisbani; Mira Sethi
- Country of origin: Pakistan
- Original language: Urdu
- No. of episodes: 28

Production
- Producers: Asif Raza Mir; Babar Javed
- Camera setup: Multi-camera
- Production company: A&B Entertainment

Original release
- Network: Geo Entertainment
- Release: 4 October 2015 – 11 February 2016

Mujhe Kuch Kehna Hai is a Pakistani television series directed by Shahood Alvi, who also played the leading role in the series alongside Sabreen Hisbani and Mira Sethi. It is produced by Babar Javed and Asif Raza Mir under banner A&B Entertainment. It first aired on 4 November 2015 on Geo Entertainment.

== Plot ==
The story starts off as the unhappy married life of a couple, Moazzam and Shazma who treat each other as strangers, despite living together. They have two daughters Seerat and Baseerat, the only reason to retain of their marriage. Moazzam and Shazma, who once were ideal partners and sincere with each other, are now themselves distant following the arrival of another girl, Seemab. Upon calling his marriage as compromise, Moazzam decides to separate with her. On knowing it, Shazma is torn apart as her only priority was her family. However, she faces the reality and starts earning livelihood for her daughters, as the sole breadwinner of the family.

== Cast ==
- Shahood Alvi as Moazzam
- Sabreen Hisbani as Shazma
- Mira Sethi as Seemab
- Anwar Iqbal
- Faiza Gillani as Azra
- Arisha Razi
- Mahi Baloch
- Kiran Abbasi

== Broadcast ==
The series first broadcast on Geo Entertainment on 4 November 2015 and last aired on 11 February 2016 after completing 28 episodes.

== Reception ==
The nuanced and strong depiction of the female protagonist was praised by the critics.
