= Janbaaz (TV series) =

2019 Pakistani television series

- Also known as: Daredevil
- جانباز
- Genre: Action; Drama; Comedy; Science fiction Romance; Thriller; War; Police procedural Serial drama
- Written by: Shahid Dogar
- Directed by: Aamir Yousuf
- Starring: Danish Taimoor; Areeba Habib; Irfan Khoosat; Qavi Khan; Ayaz Samoo; Rashid Farooqi; Sonia Rao; Hamza Firdous; Khawaja Saleem
- Country of origin: Pakistan
- Original language: Urdu
- No. of seasons: 1
- No. of episodes: 26

Production
- Producer: Satish Anand
- Production locations: Rawalpindi, Pakistan
- Camera setup: Multi-Camera setup
- Running time: approx. 42-43 minutes
- Production company: Eveready Pictures

Original release
- Network: Express Entertainment
- Release: 13 November 2019 – 5 June 2020

Janbaaz (Urdu: جانباز, lit. 'Daredevil') is a Pakistani television series and sequel to the 1984 television series Andhera Ujala. It premiered on Express Entertainment on 13 November 2019. The show is based on Police force Academy where officers are trained to serve the nation. Produced by Satish Anand under Eveready Pictures, it stars Danish Taimoor, Irfan Khoosat, Qavi Khan, Ayaz Samoo, Rashid Farooqi, Areeba Habib and Sonia Rao in pivotal roles.

The drama achieved highest peak TRP ratings of 9.8. To Date, this drama is highest rated for Express TV.

== Cast ==
- Danish Taimoor as ASP Jasim Tahir
- Irfan Khoosat as Havaldar Karam Dad
- Qavi Khan as Retd SP/Head of Police Reforms Committee (PRC) Tahir Ali Khan
- Ayaz Samoo as ASI Dildar Khan
- Rashid Farooqi as Inspector Nadir Hussain
- Areeba Habib as Forensic Expert Doctor Taniya
- Hamza Firdous as Sub Inspector Saleem
- Sonia Rao as ASI Sameera
- Khawaja Saleem as Constable Shakir Saeen
- Irfan Motiwala as Constable Kamran Shah
- Younus Arshad as Forensic Junior Faisal
- Aamir Qureshi as Karim Khan

== Production ==
Initially the title of the series was Andhera Ujala but the makers change it to Janbaaz.
