= Baby Baji =

Pakistani television series

- Title screen for season 1
- Genre: Soap opera; Family drama
- Written by: Mansoor Ahmed Khan
- Directed by: Tehseen Khan
- Starring: Samina Ahmad; Munawar Saeed; Javeria Saud; Saud; Sunita Marshall; Hassan Ahmed; Junaid Niazi; Syeda Tuba Anwar; Fazal Hussain; Aina Asif
- Country of origin: Pakistan
- Original language: Urdu
- No. of seasons: 2
- No. of episodes: 140

Production
- Producers: Abdullah Seja; Fahad Mustafa
- Production locations: Karachi, Pakistan
- Camera setup: Multi-camera setup
- Running time: 35-40 minutes per episode
- Production company: IDream Entertainment

Original release
- Network: ARY Digital
- Release: 23 May 2023 – 6 December 2024

Baby Baji is a Pakistani family soap television series produced by Abdullah Seja under his production banner IDream Entertainment. The first season of the drama was titled "Baby Baji", which ended on 1 August 2023. The 2nd season was titled Baby Baji Ki Bahuwain (Daughters-in-law of Baby Baji). The ensemble cast of the series includes Samina Ahmad, Munawar Saeed, Javeria Saud, Saud, Junaid Niazi, Sunita Marshall, Hassan Ahmed, Fazal Hussain, Syeda Tuba Anwar, and Aina Asif. The series revolves around the family of Baby Baji and her struggle to keep it united during her husband's illness.

== Plot ==
=== Season 1 ===
Baby Baji lives with her four sons (Jamal, Naseer, Wasif and Walid) and husband. Jamal is the oldest and has two kids with his wife, Azra. Azra is an evil and immoral woman, who fights with everyone in the household, and disrespects her parents-in-law. She is known for having a great temper and verbally degrades everyone who upsets her.

Naseer has one son and lives with his wife, Asma. Asma is loved for her kindness. She takes care of everyone, is reliable, patient and friendly. However, her husband Naseer doesn't love her, as he was forced to marry her, since his parents didn't approve of his lover. Naseer always verbally and physically abuses both Asma and their son.

The third son, Wasif marries Farhat, across the course of the drama. Farhat is modern, independent and outspoken. After moving into the house, she and Azra squabble, as she always fights back with her, unlike Asma.

Waleed is Baby Baji's youngest son, the only one who isn't married. He is interested in his neighbor, Saman.

The story revolves around the problems of this joint family system. After the illness of her husband, Baby Baji took the responsibility of holding her family together. Baby Baji whose elder three sons are married, struggles to maintain a balance among her children in the joint family system. Every day a new quarrel took place in the house because her oldest daughter in law, Azra, is cunning, rude and manipulative. After the death of Baby Baji's husband, all the sons took their part from the property and separated. All this happened because of two of Baby Baji's daughters-in-law, Azra and Farhat, who fought daily. The only good daughter-in-law was Nasir's wife, Asma as she respected her in-laws despite her husband mistreating her.

After separating, the sons created a system where Baby Baji and Walid would live at a different son's house every month. She kept constantly moving between the three houses as no son wanted her to stay for too long. Baby Baji tried her best to reunite her sons but she is expelled from the house by Azra. She became homeless and went to an old-age home. Walid, after returning home from Lahore, finds her in the old-age home and yells at his brothers for neglecting to care for her. After facing the consequences of their own deeds, all three sons realized the importance of their mother. Jamal expels Azra from the house and she is diagnosed with cancer. Naseer is conned by his lover on the wedding day and returns to apologize to his mother, as she was right. She forgives him. However, it has become too late then and in the end, Baby Baji dies after arranging Waleed and Saman's engagement. Wasif, who had gone abroad without meeting his mom, doesn't make it back to Pakistan in time for her burial.

=== Season 2 ===
After an year, all sons of Baby Baji reunite, and live together at Jamal's house. Asma owns a clothing boutique. Farhat handles the household. The four brothers are running a shoe business. Azra is healed from cancer, she lives at her mother's house as Jamal kicked her out from the house. Azra arrives at Jamal's house on Baby Baji's death anniversary, but Jamal don't allow her to remain. However Asma convinces Jamal to take Azra back at home as she has changed, and Baby Baji has forgiven her before death. Asma handovers a gold bracelet to Azra as Baby Baji wanted.

The brothers buy their parents a house again and shifts into it. Everything was going right until Jamal's Aunt (Siddiqui's sister Rizwana) with her daughter (Saira) and granddaughter (Ashi), enters the house with the intention of taking away house, boutique and business from Siddiqui family. Jamal becomes her aunt's puppet, he handovers the house to her. Her daughter Saira starts working with Asma in the boutique as she wanted to take it. Jamal unintentionally signs business property papers to his Aunt. Meanwhile, Walid and Saman get married. Saira successfully becomes Asma's boutique shareholder. After Wasif leaves the house in anger because Jamal signed away the house under phuppo's name, Jamal realizes his mistake. Phuppo refuses to give the house and business back to Jamal and his brothers. Under stress and blaming himself for ruining the future of his brothers, Jamal has a heart attack and dies. All members of Saddique family except Azra leave their home .Azra found out that Saira hasn't been divorced. Aashi and Amber have passed their 10th exams, Aashi find out the same purse his dad made for her, in a stationery shop. Azra asks Waleed to search Aashi's father, Saman's father Quraishi tries to help Waleed. Quraishi meet with an accident, planned by Bilal. Quraishi is healed, Azra's iddah has ended and she reunite with her family. Waleed finds out that Aashi's father is in Central Jail Karachi, among Azra, he meets him. Gulzaar tells Azra and Waleed how he got into Jail... Years earlier, Saira had an affair with a man, who had committed suicide at her house, Saira, her mother and Gulzar are supposed responsible for the death. With the help of Bilal, Saira and her mother creates proves against Gulzaar and make him go to jail. Azra promises to reunite him with Aashi. With the help of famous cloth designer Farid, Azra and Asma accuses Saira of copying exhibition dresses, they blackmails Phoppo's family to return everything back, including Siddiqui house, business, Asma's boutique and all the bank balance. Siddiqui family returns home, Phoppo, Saira and Aashi are living at Bilal's place until they rent a house. Bilal asks them to make Aashi marry him. Aashi has find out his father is in jail, Saira takes her phone and locks her in the room and tells her that she will marry Bilal the next day. Aashi writes a letter asking for help, with written Siddiqui house address. The next day a lady comes at Siddiqui house and gives the letter to Azra. Azra arrives in time to stop the marriage, Bilal tries to grab the pistol and shoots himself accidentally and dies. Saira and her mother goes to jail. Gulzar is released from jail and lives happily with his daughter Aashi. Farhat gives birth to a boy. Farhat and Wasif asks Azra to name the baby. Azra tells the family that a soul was taken away from the family and God gifted another, she names him "Jamal". Siddiqui family has taken revenge and is living united and peacefully a happy life.

== Cast ==
=== Main ===
- Samina Ahmad as Rashida Begum "Baby Baji" Saddique: Former Matriarch of Saddique House; Saddique's widow; Jamal, Naseer, Wasif and Waleed's mother; Amber, Shazaib, Umer and Jr. Jamal's grandmother (Dead)
- Munawar Saeed as Saddique Sahab: Former Patriarch of Saddique House; Rizwana's brother; Baby Baji's late husband; Jamal, Naseer, Wasif and Waleed's father; Amber, Shazaib, Umer and Jr. Jamal grandfather (Dead)
- Asma Abbas as Rizwana Amjad: Saddique's sister; Amjad's widow; Saira's mother; Aashi's grandmother
- Saud as Jamal Saddique: Former Patriarch of Saddique House; Baby Baji and Saddique's eldest son; Naseer, Wasif and Waleed's brother; Azra's late husband; Amber and Umer's father (Dead)
- Javeria Saud as Azra Jamal: Matriarch of Saddique House; Jamal's widow; Amber and Umer's mother
- Hassan Ahmad as Naseer Saddique: Patriarch of Saddique House; Baby Baji and Saddique's second son; Jamal, Wasif and Waleed's brother; Asma's husband; Rakshi former lover; Shazaib father
- Sunita Marshall as Asma Naseer: Naseer's wife; Shazaib's mother
- Junaid Niazi as Wasif Saddique: Baby Baji and Saddique's third son; Jamal, Naseer and Waleed's brother; Farhat's husband; Rameen's former lover; Jr. Jamal's father
- Syeda Tuba Anwar as Farhat Wasif: Wasif's wife; Jr. Jamal's mother
- Fazal Hussain as Waleed Saddique: Baby Baji and Saddique's youngest son; Jamal, Naseer and Wasif's brother; Saman's husband
- Aina Asif / Rimha Ahmed as Saman Waleed: Qureeshi and Shenaz's daughter; Waleed's wife

=== Recurring ===
- Madiha Iftikhar as Saira Gulzar: Amjad and Rizwana's daughter; Gulzar's estranged wife; Aashi's mother
- Afzal Khan as Qurreshi Sahab: Shenaz's husband; Saman's father
- Salina Sipra as Shenaz Qureeshi: Qurreshi's wife; Baby Baji and Azra's best friend; Saman's mother
- Afshan Qureshi as Azra's mother
- Mizna Waqas as Rakshi: Naseer's former lover
- Fareeha Jabeen as Rakshi's mother
- Faiza Khan as Rameen: Wasif's former lover and business partner
- Farhad Ali as Ali: Wasif's friend
- Javeria Nayyar as Gulshan Ara: Azra's neighbor and close friend
- Alishba Yasin / Hania Ahmed as Amber Jamal: Azra and Jamal's daughter; Umer's sister
- Ali Mehndi as Shazaib Naseer: Asma and Naseer's son
- Unknown as Umer Jamal: Azra and Jamal's son
- Aishsa Afridi as Aashi Gulzar: Saira and Gulzar's daughter
- Unknown as Bilal: Rizwana and Saira's old neighbour; Aashi's love interest (Dead)

== Production ==
Hassan Ahmed was earlier offered the role of Jamal, which he rejected, and he was again approached to portray the character of Naseer. Hassan's spouse Sunita Marshall portrayed the Asma, Naseer's wife, for which she was not the first choice.

== Soundtrack ==
The original soundtrack was performed by Bisma Abdullah with Eva B as a rap artist. The lyrics and composition were by The Loop Men.

== Reception ==
Galaxy Lollywood praised the series for tackling the various common and relatable problems of a joint family.

A critic from the Daily Times reviewed that the story of the series is a bit hard to be comprehend. Javeria Saud's performance as a cunning and outspoken daughter-in-law was well received by critics and audiences.

A reviewer from The News International lauded the performances of some actors, clever characterisation, fast-paced narrative and depiction of traditions.

The soap opera gained high viewership both on television and digitally on YouTube. It gained the highest rating, 15.7 TRPs, which became the highest rated last episode of the year.

Due To The Success Of Both Seasons, it prompted rival channels in Pakistan to launch similar theme based series such as Green Entertainment’s Mohabbat Satrangi, Mohabbat Aur Mehangai and Geo TV’s Bajjo.

== Sequel ==
In December 2023, the sequel for the Baby Baji was announced with the title of Baby Baji Ki Bahuwain. The second season premiered from September 2024 to December 2024, broadcasting episodes daily at 7:00 PST on ARY Digital.
