= Areeba Habib =

Pakistani actress and model

- Born: 1 May 1993 (age 33); Karachi, Sindh, Pakistan
- Occupations: model, actress
- Years active: 2014 – present
- Known for: Jalan; Koi Chand Rakh

Areeba Habib (Urdu: اریبہ حبیب) is a Pakistani model and television actress. Habib made her television debut with negative role of Nishaal in 2018 series Koi Chand Rakh. She further played the role of Chand in Qadam Qadam Ishq, Taniya in Janbaaz and Misha in Jalan.

== Career ==
Habib was introduced to the Pakistani fashion industry by model Frieha Altaf. She has appeared in several TV commercials for international and local brands and walked the ramp for several designers. In 2018 she made her acting debut with Koi Chand Rakh opposite Ayeza Khan and Imran Abbas and has since then appeared in leading roles in several television shows including Qadam Qadam Ishq opposite Azfar Rehman, Janbaaz opposite Danish Taimoor and Jalan opposite Emmad Irfani. She also worked in the TV play Rukhsati alongside Azfar Rehman. She started her YouTube channel in 2019.

== Television ==
Year	Title	Role	Director	Notes
2018	Koi Chand Rakh	Nishaal Niazi	Siraj-ul-Haque	
2018	Qadam Qadam Ishq	Chand	Kashif Saleem	
2019	Janbaaz	Tania	Aamir Yousuf	
2020	Jalan	Misha	Aabis Raza	
2020	Aik Aur Munafiq	Atifa	Episode: Jholi	
2022	Angna	Abeeha	Tehseen Khan	
2022	Nehar	Komal	Choudhary Ali Hassan	
