= Mubarak Ho Beti Hui Hai =

- Genre: Drama
- Written by: Faiza Iftikhar
- Directed by: Badar Mehmood
- Starring: Saima Noor; Sajid Hasan; Sabreen Hisbani; Ayesha Khan; Naheed Shabbir; Ali Abbas, Akhter Hasnain, Mariam Ansari; Saboor Ali
- Country of origin: Pakistan
- Original language: Urdu
- No. of seasons: 1
- No. of episodes: 35

Production
- Producers: Fahad Mustafa; Dr. Ali Kazmi
- Running time: 35-45 minutes
- Production company: Big Bang Entertainment

Original release
- Network: Ary Digital
- Release: 19 April – 1 September 2017

Mubarak Ho Beti Hui Hai (Urdu: مبارک ہو بیٹی ہوئی ہے, lit. 'Congratulations! It's a Girl') is a Pakistani drama series directed by Badar Mehmood and written by Faiza Iftikhar. It originally aired on ARY Digital in 2017.

The series stars Saima Noor as the mother of four daughters, focusing on her struggles in a male-dominated society where girls are viewed as a liability until they are married off. It also stars Sajid Hasan as her husband who abandons his family, and Saboor Ali as their defiant daughter, Amber. Ayesha Khan plays her mother-in-law who in the first episode refuses to accept that the fourth child is a girl.

== Cast ==
- Saima Noor as Naheed
- Sajid Hasan as Sadiq
- Saboor Ali as Amber
- Sabreen Hisbani as Anila
- Ayesha Khan as Sadiq's mother
- Naheed Shabbir as Faria
- Sabiha Hashmi as Faria's mother
- Ali Abbas
- Akhter Hasnain
- Mariam Ansari
