= Kafeel (TV series) =

2025 Pakistani television series

- Genre: Family drama; Social drama
- Written by: Umera Ahmed
- Directed by: Meesam Naqvi
- Starring: Sanam Saeed; Emmad Irfani; Aashir Wajahat; Areeka Haq
- Country of origin: Pakistan
- Original language: Urdu
- No. of episodes: 34

Production
- Producers: Fahad Mustafa; Dr. Ali Kazmi
- Production company: Big Bang Entertainment

Original release
- Network: ARY Digital
- Release: December 15, 2025 – April 28, 2026

Kafeel is a Pakistani television drama series written by Umera Ahmed and directed by Meesam Naqvi. Produced by Big Bang Entertainment, the series stars Sanam Saeed and Emmad Irfani in the lead roles. It premiered on ARY Digital on 15 December 2025.

== Plot ==
The story follows Zeba, a woman whose married life becomes increasingly difficult as she discovers troubling aspects of her husband's personality. As Jamshed's behaviour changes and family responsibilities intensify, she struggles with emotional hardship and the challenges of maintaining her household.

== Cast ==
- Sanam Saeed as Zeba
- Emmad Irfani as Jamshed (Jami)
- Aashir Wajahat as Subuk
- Areeka Haq as Daneen
- Hania Ahmed as Tania
- Nooray Zeeshan as Javeria
- Haya Khan as Zoya
- Kashif Mehmood as Jawwad
- Munazza Arif
- Hasan Khan
- Javed Rizvi
- Momina Bajwa
- Abdullah Khan Niazi
- Sabiha Hashmi
- Momin Durrani
- Baakh Pirzada
- Yasir Yazdani
- Saira Arif
- Mina Rehman

== Reception ==
The drama attracted attention for its portrayal of marital conflict and family relationships. Its themes of emotional abuse and the effects of dysfunctional family environments were also discussed in subsequent commentary.
