= Hasad =

- Title screen
- حسد
- Genre: Drama
- Developed by: Masood Khan
- Written by: Abida Ahmed; Maimoona Aziz
- Screenplay by: ARY Digital
- Directed by: Aabis Raza
- Starring: Minal Khan; Arij Fatyma; Noor Hassan Rizvi; Saba Faisal; Nida Mumtaz; Ayaz Samoo
- Music by: SK Salman Khan; Deniss Tanveer; Sk Studio
- Opening theme: "Rabba Meray" by Sehar Gul Khan
- Composer: Sehar Gul
- Country of origin: Pakistan
- Original language: Urdu
- No. of seasons: 1
- No. of episodes: 24

Production
- Producers: Fahad Mustafa; Dr. Ali Kazmi
- Production locations: Karachi, Sindh, Pakistan
- Editor: Masood Khan
- Camera setup: Multi-camera setup
- Running time: 70-75 minutes
- Production company: Big Bang Entertainment

Original release
- Network: ARY Digital
- Release: 10 June – 2 September 2019

Hasad (transl. Jealousy) is a 2019 Pakistani family drama television series produced by Fahad Mustafa and Dr. Ali Kazmi under Big Bang Entertainment and directed by Aabis Raza. It stars Minal Khan, Arij Fatyma and Noor Hassan Rizvi. The show aired every Monday evening on ARY Digital.

== Plot ==
Naintara is happily married to Armaan. Both live happily and love each other immensely. However, their love for each other seems to face extreme jealousy and evil eye from Zareen who despises the idea of another couple's happiness, as she and Farhan (Zareen's husband and Armaan's older brother) are unhappily married because Farhan gives more attention to his work than her. One day, on the account of their anniversary, robbers attack their house. Armaan dies in the encounter with the robbers and from thereon, begins Naintara's suffering. Zareen tries everything in her power to make her life miserable, especially when she learns that Naintara is pregnant with Armaan's child. She tries her best in several ways to trap Naintara but Farhan soon realizes everything Zareen has been doing to Naintara. Naintara is found to be pregnant with a boy, and several months later, her boy - Arsalan is born. Farhan's mother advises him to marry Naintara to save her from the backbiting and gossip in their neighborhood. Naintara and Farhan get married, sparking Zareen's anger and jealousy even more.

== Cast ==
- Minal Khan as Naintara
- Arij Fatyma as Zareen aka Zari
- Noor Hassan Rizvi as Farhan; Naintara and Zari's husband
- Saba Faisal as Sadiqa, Armaan and Farhan's mother
- Nida Mumtaz as Nusrat; Zari and Kashee's mother
- Ayaz Samoo as Kashee; Zari's brother
- Arsalan Faisal as Dr. Bilal; Farhan's business partner
- Shehroz Sabzwari as Armaan; Naintara's former husband (cameo)
- Mehwish Qureshi as Rameen; Naintara's sister
- Tipu Sharif as Rameen's husband, Naintara's brother-in-law

== Digital release ==
This series is available to watch on Indian OTT Platform MX Player App.
