= Jithani =

Pakistani television series

- Genre: Family drama Soap opera
- Written by: Imran Nazeer
- Screenplay by: Zakir Ahmed
- Directed by: Haseeb Ali
- Starring: Farah Shah; Erum Akhtar; Komal Aziz Khan; Saima Qureshi; Shezeen Rahat; Farhan Ali Agha; Madiha Rizvi; Yasir Shoro
- Country of origin: Pakistan
- Original language: Urdu
- No. of seasons: 1
- No. of episodes: 95

Production
- Executive producer: Momina Duraid
- Producer: Momina Duraid
- Editor: Muhammad Adeel Khalid
- Camera setup: Multi-camera setup
- Production company: MD Productions

Original release
- Network: Hum TV
- Release: 6 February – 16 June 2017

Jithani is a Pakistani television soap opera first aired on 6 February 2016 on Hum TV. It is produced by Momina Duraid and their MD Productions and directed by Haseeb Ali. It aired every Monday to Friday 7.30 pm PST.

== Cast ==
- Komal Aziz Khan as Haniya
- Farah Shah as Sheyla
- Erum Akhtar as Raheela
- Farhan Ali Agha as Faizan
- Sabiha Hashmi as Faizan's mother
- Shazeen Rahat
- Yasir Shoro
- Saima Qureshi as Iffat
- Madiha Rizvi
- Hassan Noman

== See also ==
- List of programs broadcast by Hum TV
