= Izn-e-Rukhsat =

- Genre: Family drama Romantic drama
- Created by: Abdullah Kadwani; Asad Qureshi
- Written by: Maha Malik
- Directed by: Ahmed Kamran
- Starring: Sabreen Hisbani; Shahzad Sheikh; Faisal Rehman
- Theme music composer: Fakhir
- Opening theme: Izn-e-Rukshat by Fakhir
- Country of origin: Pakistan
- Original language: Urdu
- No. of episodes: 28

Production
- Producers: Abdullah Kadwani; Asad Qureshi
- Camera setup: Multi-camera setup

Original release
- Network: Geo Tv
- Release: July 11, 2016 – January 23, 2017

Izn-e-Rukhsat (Urdu: اذنِ رخصت, lit. 'Permission to Depart') is a Pakistani drama serial that first aired on Geo TV on 11 July 2016, with each of its 28 episodes broadcast on Mondays at 8:00pm until 23 January 2017. It is produced by Abdullah Kadwani and Asad Qureshi.

== Plot ==
Sundus comes from a broken family. She is raised by her mother after the painful separation of her parents. Although her father's absence has taken a toll on her personality, she pretends to belong to a happy family in front of her love interest, Haider.

This camouflage is far from reality, but she has built this cover story over the years to avoid speculations. Sundus's world is shaken when Haider's mother (a single parent, but a widow) shows interest in meeting her parents.

At this point, Sundus's parents, Tehreem and Ehtishaam, get in touch after years of separation and decide to live together for a few months to maintain a façade of a happy family— deciding that they will move on with their own lives after their daughter's wedding.

This brings Ehtisham some struggle to face his second wife and son, while Tehreem has to fight with her own emotions to live with Ehtisham again despite all the baggage she has been carrying from the times they lived together. Above all, Sundus will experience family life for the first time with both her parents together— which will hopefully shape her as a better individual.

== Cast ==
- Faisal Rehman as Ehtishaam (Naila's husband and Tehreem's ex-husband)
- Sabreen Hisbani as Naila (Ehtishaam's second wife)
- Faiza Hasan as Tehreem (Ehtishaam's first Wife)
- Sonia Mishal as Sundus (Tehreem and Ehtishaam's daughter)
- Shehzad Sheikh as Haider (Sundus's husband)
- Humaira Bano as Saira (Haider's mother)
- Haroon Kadwani as Shayaan (Naila and Ehtishaam's son)
- Tipu Sharif as Daniyal (Tehreem's brother-in-law)
- Sumaiyya Bukhsh as Maira (Sundus's friend)
- Sabiha Hashmi as Suraiya (Naila's mother and Shayan's grandmother)
- Ghulam Mohiuddin as Sundus's father
- Faiza Gillani as Midhat (Haider's sister)
- Mariya Khan as Novera (Tehreem's sister)
- Azra Mohyeddin as Azmat (Tehreem's sister-in-law)

== See also ==
- List of programs broadcast by Geo TV
- Geo TV
- List of Pakistani television serials
