= Ishq Hai =

2021 Pakistani television series

- Genre: Romance; Drama
- Written by: Rehana Aftaab
- Directed by: Aabis Raza
- Starring: Minal Khan; Danish Taimoor
- Music by: SK Salman Khan
- Country of origin: Pakistan
- Original language: Urdu
- No. of episodes: 38

Production
- Producers: Fahad Mustafa; Ali Kazmi
- Production company: Big Bang Entertainment

Original release
- Network: ARY Digital
- Release: 15 June – 14 September 2021

Ishq Hai is a Pakistani television series directed by Aabis Raza and produced by Fahad Mustafa and Ali Kazmi under the banner Big Bang Entertainment. The series features Danish Taimoor and Minal Khan in leading roles while Saba Faisal, Babar Ali, Hammad Shoaib and Mahenur Haider in supporting cast.

== Synopsis ==
Isra and Shahzaib are in love with each other and want to marry. However, Shahzaib's mother opposes the idea as she wants to marry Shahzaib to her niece. On the other hand, Isra also faces the same problem from her elders. Her brother is against her marrying Shahzaib and her father one day finalizes her marriage with a guy played by Hammad Shoaib. On the wedding day, Shahzaib kidnaps Isra and threatens her with suicide. Out of necessity Isra agrees and both become husband and wife. On the other side, all at Isra's home assume that it was Isra who had eloped from her home by her own will.

== Cast ==
- Minal Khan as Isra Waqar
- Danish Taimoor as Shahzeb Husayn
- Azekah Daniel as Naina
- Mahenur Haider as Nimra
- Faraz Farooqui as Hammad
- Hammad Shoaib as Haris
- Babar Ali as Waqar; Isra's father
- Farah Nadeem as Farhat
- Saba Faisal as Shahzaib's mother
- Rashid Farooqui
- Saife Hassan
- Saima Qureshi as Saba
- Sajjad Paul as Raza
- Mahi Baloch as Sameera
- Tabbasum Arif as Maryam (Haris's mother)

== Reception ==
The series was one of the highest series during its broadcast in July–August 2021.

The serial received mixed-negative reviews from the critics. It also received criticism and poor reviews and being labelled as "problematic" by some due to toxic masculinity portrayal of obsession as love and huge toxic characters in the plot.

The drama ended with 8.6 TRP and 10.3 Peak Ratings. The drama peaked with 13.8 TRP ratings. It has also generated over 1 Billion views on YouTube, securing a BLOCKBUSTER status.

== Accolades ==
=== Lux Style Awards ===
Ceremony	Categories	Recipients	Result
21st Lux Style Awards	Best TV Play	Ishq Hai	Nominated
21st Lux Style Awards	Best TV Actor (Viewers' Choice)	Danish Taimoor	Nominated
21st Lux Style Awards	Best TV Actress (Viewers' Choice)	Minal Khan	Nominated
