= Mar Jain Bhi To Kya =

2012 Pakistani television series

- Genre: Drama; Romance
- Written by: Iqbal Bano
- Directed by: Saif-e-Hassan
- Creative director: Adeel Qamar Khan
- Starring: Farhan Ali Agha; Arij Fatyma; Eshita Mehboob; Jana Malik; Syed Jibran; Anum Fayyaz
- Opening theme: "Mar Jain Bhi To Kya"; Lyrics; Saif-e-Hassan; Performed by Saima Iqbal
- Composer: Sahaiby (MAD Music)
- Country of origin: Pakistan
- Original language: Urdu
- No. of seasons: 1
- No. of episodes: 68-69

Production
- Executive producers: Adnan Khan; Subhan Mazhar
- Producer: Momina Duraid
- Production location: Karachi
- Cinematography: Shehzad Kashmiri
- Editors: Kashif Ahmed; Danish Usmani; Noman Nafees
- Running time: 38 minutes
- Production company: Moomal Productions

Original release
- Network: Hum TV
- Release: 1 October 2012 – 30 January 2013

Mar Jain Bhi To Kya (Urdu: مر جائیں بھی تو کیا, lit. 'So what happens even if we die') is a popular Pakistani Soap directed by Saif-e-Hassan and written by Iqbal Bano.

== Cast ==
=== Main cast ===
- Farhan Ali Agha as Raza Ali Khan
- Arij Fatyma as Salia
- Syed Jibran as Irfan
- Eshita Mehboob as Samina
- Jana Malik as Tara

=== Other credited cast ===
- Anum Fayyaz as Zareen
- Asma Jahangir as Saida
- Kunwar Nafees as Nadir
- Saif-e-Hassan
- Sheirin Maqsood
- Afshan Qureshi as Phuppu Nadir's Mother
- Niaz Ali khan
- Naeem Sheikh
- Seema Sehar as Salia's Mother
- Nasar-ul-Allah Khan
- Paray Paleejo
- Esha Noor as Maria
- Sania
- Ayesha Ali
- Salma Shaheen
- 'Manoj
- Zakir Babar
- Ammad
- Marya Rehman
- Abbas
- Kanwal
- Murtaza

=== Child artist ===
- Muhammad Ali
- Abdul Qadir
- Zainab
- Dania
- Shaizel

== Soundtrack ==
Mar Jain Bhi To Kya

Soundtrack album by Saima Iqbal
- Genre: Theme song
- Length: 3:51
- Language: Urdu
- Producer: Momina Duraid

The theme song Mar Jain Bhi To Kya was composed by Shaiby and sung by Saima Iqbal. It was written by Director Saif-e-Hassan.

Tracklist
No.	Title	Singer(s)	Length
1.	"Mar Jain Bhi To Kya"	Saima Iqbal	3:51

== See also ==
- Humsafar
- Qaid-e-Tanhai
- Shehr-e-Zaat
