= Meri Beti =

- Genre: Drama
- Written by: Mohsin Ali
- Directed by: Badar Mehmood
- Starring: Arij Fatyma; Sabreen Hisbani; Samina Peerzada
- Opening theme: "Bhoola Na Yeh Dil"
- Country of origin: Pakistan
- Original language: Urdu
- No. of episodes: 26

Production
- Producers: Fahad Mustafa; Ali Kazmi
- Production location: Karachi
- Running time: 40 minutes
- Production company: Big Bang Entertainment

Original release
- Network: ARY Digital Network
- Release: 9 October 2013 – 2 April 2014

Meri Beti (English: My Daughter) is a Pakistani television series that premiered on ARY Digital on 9 October 2013. Produced by Fahad Mustafa and Ali Kazmi under the banner of Big Bang Entertainment, the serial stars Arij Fatyma, Sabreen Hisbani and Samina Peerzada in lead roles.

It was aired in India on Zindagi in 2016.

== Plot ==
Saba (Sabreen Hisbani) and her five-year-old daughter Iraj (Mariyam Khalif) live with her mother (Samina Peerzada) after her divorce from her husband. Saba marries Faisal (Shahood Alvi) and leaves Iraj in her mother's care. Ammi tells Iraj that she (Ammi) is her mother and Saba is her elder sister. Iraj falls in love with Asad (Junaid Khan), and they get married. Iraj's mother-in-law finds out the truth from her friend, and asks Asad to leave Iraj. Iraj approaches Ammi seeking to know the truth. On knowing the truth, she is angry and hurt. She behaves rudely with Ammi and her own mother, causing both of them great distress. Iraj gives birth to a daughter. Asad is not ready to accept his daughter and divorces Iraj. Faisal finds out about Saba as well and leaves Saba. Ammi eventually dies from the shock. After Ammi's death, Iraj reconciles with Saba. With Iraj's efforts, Faisal reconciles with Saba. He asks Iraj to stay with him as his daughter, but Iraj is unable to agree to it. She decides to live on her own, caring for her daughter Dua. The series ends with Iraj fondly reminiscing the times she spent with her Ammi, the one who lovingly raised her.

== Cast ==
- Arij Fatyma as Iraj
- Sabreen Hisbani as Saba, Iraj's mother
- Samina Peerzada as Ammi, Iraj's grandmother
- Shahood Alvi as Faisal, Saba's second husband
- Junaid Khan as Asad, Iraj's husband
- Ismat Zaidi as Faisal's mother
- Aiman Khan as Rida, Saba and Faisal's daughter
- Shaheen Khan as Asad's mother
- Mariyam Khalif as child Iraj

== Soundtrack ==
Bhoola Na Yeh Dil

Soundtrack album by Sajjad Ali and Waqar Ali
- Genre: Theme song
- Length: 2:45
- Language: Urdu
- Producer: Big Bang Entertainment

Track list
No.	Title	Singer(s)	Length
1.	"Bhoola Na Yeh Dil"	Sajjad Ali; Waqar Ali	2:45

== See also ==
- ARY Digital
- Pakistani Dramas
- List of programs broadcast by ARY Digital
- List of Pakistani television serials
