= Saife Hassan =

Pakistani actor and director

Saife Hasan
- سیفِ حسن
- Born: Karachi, Sindh, Pakistan
- Occupations: Director, actor
- Years active: 1996–present

Saife Hasan (Urdu: سیفِ حسن) is a Pakistani TV director and actor. He is best known for the drama serial Dil ki Madham Boliyan (2005) and Ehd-e-Wafa (2019). He has directed the drama serial Bari Aapa (2012), for which he was nominated for the Hum Award for Best Director Drama Serial at the 1st Hum Awards, and Ru Baru.

== Career ==
=== Actor ===
Although he is better known for his work in television, Hassan initially began as a theatre actor, working extensively with Sheema Kermani's Tehrik-e-Niswan, among other theatrical groups. On television, he mainly plays supporting roles.

=== Director ===
Hassan has worked as a director for more than ten years at Hum TV, and since 2003 has directed ventures for television channels. He directs exclusively for the Hum TV channel.

== Filmography ==
=== Films ===
Year	Title	Role	Ref(s)
2005	Shahrukh Khan Ki Maut	Shamshad	
2013	Main Hoon Shahid Afridi		
2016	Actor in Law	Guddu Mamu	
2016	Jeewan Hathi		
2019	Superstar	Zahid Malik	
2022	Dum Mastam		
2022	Parde Mein Rehne Do		

=== Television series ===
Year	Title	Role	Director	Network	Ref(s)
2012–13	Mar Jain Bhi To Kya		Yes	Hum TV	
2012	Bari Aapa		Yes	Hum TV	
2013–14	Aseerzadi			Hum TV	
2014	Ru Baru		Yes	Hum TV	
2014	Uff Meri Family			Hum TV	
2015	Dil Ka Kia Rung Karun		Yes	Hum TV	
2015	Tum Mere Paas Raho		Yes	Hum TV	
2015–16	Ishq-e-Benaam		Yes	Hum TV	
2016	Aap Ke Liye			ARY Digital	
2016–17	Sang-e-Mar Mar		Yes	Hum TV	
2017	Sammi		Yes	Hum TV	
2018	Belapur Ki Dayan		Yes	Hum TV	
2018	Visaal	Dilbar/ Azam		ARY Digital	
2019	Pyar Kahani	Gullu Bhai		Hum TV	
2019	Bharosa Pyar Tera			Geo Entertainment	
2019–20	Alif	Master Ibrahim		Geo Entertainment	
2020	Ehd-e-Wafa		Yes	Hum TV	
2020–21	Fitrat	Ayaz		Geo Entertainment	
2020–21	Ghisi Piti Mohabbat	Naheed		ARY Digital	
2020–21	Dunk	Faraz		ARY Digital	
2021	Safar Tamam Howa	Anwar		Hum TV	
2021	Laapata	Inspector Tahir		Hum TV	
2021	Ishq Hai			ARY Digital	
2021	Parizaad	IG Sheharyar		Hum TV	
2022	Sang-e-Mah		Yes	Hum TV	
2022	Ruposh	Ashfaq		Geo Entertainment	
2022	Fraud	Khawar		ARY Digital	
2022	Paristan	Ishaq		Hum TV	
2022	Hum Tum	Professor Jabir		Hum TV	
2022	Mushkil	Ibrahim		Geo Entertainment	
2023	Jhok Sarkar		Yes	Hum TV	
2024	Zard Patton Ka Bunn		Yes	Hum TV	
2024-25	Tan Man Neel o Neel	Sardar Rao	Yes	Hum TV	
2025	Jinn Ki Shadi Unki Shadi	Himself	Yes	Hum TV	
2025	Pamaal	Himself		Green Entertainment	
2026	Zanjeerain	Lala		Hum TV	
2026	Aap Ki Izzat		Yes	Hum TV	

== Awards and nominations ==
Year	Award	Category	Work	Result	Ref.
2018	Lux Style Awards	Best TV Director	Sang-e-Mar Mar	Won	
2018	Lux Style Awards	Best TV Director	Sammi	Nominated	
2021	Lux Style Awards	Best TV Director	Ehd-e-Wafa	Nominated	
2023	Lux Style Awards	Best TV Director	Sang-e-Mah	Won	
