= Aap Ke Liye =

2016 Pakistani television series

- Title screen
- Genre: Drama
- Written by: Faiza Iftikhar
- Directed by: Badar Mehmood
- Starring: Faryal Mehmood; Arij Fatyma; Faisal Qureshi
- Country of origin: Pakistan
- Original language: Urdu
- No. of episodes: 24

Production
- Producers: Fahad Mustafa and Dr. Ali Kazmi.
- Production company: Big Bang Entertainment

Original release
- Network: ARY Digital
- Release: 12 July – 29 November 2016

Aap Kay Liye (Urdu: آپ کے لیے, lit. 'For You') is an ARY Digital drama serial first aired 16 August 2016 starring Faryal Mehmood, Arij Fatyma, and Faisal Qureshi.

== Plot ==
Shaheer is a sophisticated rich businessman but his property becomes the reason for his divorce, and that's where the story begins. Shaheer's own sister, along with her husband creates problems in his life because she is after his property. Washma, a colleague of his, comes into his life and falls in love with him.

Although she belongs to a very middle-class family but they get along and eventually marry each other. But this class difference and the past remain a problem in their relationship. "Shaheer will be older than Washma with much more experience in life but in a few matters Washma seems more sensible than him. Basically Shaheer is simple and can trust others easily."

Although Washma is too young but she has an eye and sense to judge others.' Samina Peerzada just played the role of a very majbur aurat in the play Beqasoor but in this play her character will have more room for performance and the viewers will get to see her in a character which has more to offer than Sadaf of Beqasoor. Talking about her character Faiza Iftikhar said, "It is a sort of negative character but not evil. There is also nand bhabi taakra but not in a typical way.'"

== Cast ==
- Faryal Mehmood as Shaheer's first Wife
- Arij Fatima as Washma Shaheer's wife
- Faisal Qureshi as Shaheer
- Salma Hassan as Bhabi
- Waseem Abbas as Imdad
- Ghana Ali as Areesha
- Samina Peerzada as Nishat
- Saife Hassan as Washma Brother

== Schedule ==
Aap Kay Liye airs Tuesdays at 9:00 pm on ARY Digital.
