= Aunn Zara =

Television series

- Genre: Family Drama; Comedy
- Based on: Hisaar-e-Mohabbat by Faiza Iftikhar
- Written by: Faiza Iftikhar
- Directed by: Haissam Hussain
- Starring: Maya Ali; Osman Khalid Butt
- Theme music composer: MAD Music
- Opening theme: Aunn Zara
- Composer: MAD music
- Country of origin: Pakistan
- Original language: Urdu
- No. of episodes: 20

Production
- Executive producer: Tahir Mehmood
- Producer: Shahzad Chaudhry
- Production locations: Lahore, Punjab, Pakistan
- Cinematography: iIlyas Kashmiri
- Editor: Iftikhar Manzoor
- Camera setup: Shehzad Baloch
- Production company: Oriental Films

Original release
- Network: A-Plus Entertainment
- Release: 18 June – 31 October 2013

Aunn Zara (Urdu: عون زارا) is a 2013 Pakistan drama television series telecast on A-Plus Entertainment. It revolves around a married couple spoilt by their respective families and desperate to escape this attention. It is based on Faiza Iftikhar's novel Hisaar-e-Mohabbat, and is directed by Haissam Hussain. It stars Maya Ali and Osman Khalid Butt.

== Plot ==
The story revolves around the lives of Aunn and Zara. Aunn, being the only male in his family, is overtly pampered by everyone. Aunn is dying to break out of the shackles of his overprotective and overbearing family members. Zara is a headstrong and vivacious girl. In contrast to Aunn, she lives in a house where she is the only female member of her immediate family. Zara lives with her father and grandfather. Her father, Jamshed, a retired army officer, wants Zara to join the air force. However, Zara wants to have a family life.

Aunn and Zara's first encounter upsets them. A misunderstanding lands Aunn's proposal in front of Zara's family. Unaware of the proposal, Zara lies to her father that she loves Aunn.

When Aunn and Zara discover who they are marrying, they resist but eventually get married. The duo spend time together and eventually fall in love. Aunn realizes that his family is overbearing, and he cannot spend time with Zara. He creates misunderstandings between Zara and his family. Soon a rift develops between Zara and Aunn's family, resulting in Aunn and Zara shifting to another house. Zara learns that she is pregnant.

Zara's friend, Shehna, clears the misunderstanding between Nighat and Zara. Meanwhile, Aunn informs his family about Zara's pregnancy. Aunn's family gets excited, but they fear that Zara might want to keep them away from the baby. Nighat informs the family about Aunn's past actions leading to the strained relationship with Zara. Aunn also confesses his mistakes. Zara eventually reconciles with Aunn's family.

== Cast ==
- Maya Ali as Zara
- Osman Khalid Butt as Aunn
- Sabreen Hisbani as Nighat
- Irfan Khoosat as Zara's paternal grandfather
- Nasreen Qureshi as Aunn's paternal grandmother
- Hina Khawaja Bayat as Husna
- Mukarram Kaleem as Manzar
- Adnan Jaffar as Zara's father Jamshed
- Yasir Masher as Aunn's paternal Uncle
- Mahira Bhatti as Shehna
- Saima Saleem as Aunn's paternal aunt

== Soundtrack ==
Aunn Zara

Soundtrack album by Ather, Ragini
- Genre: Theme song
- Length: 2:53
- Language: Urdu
- Producer: Shahzad Chaudhary

The theme song "Aunn Zara" was composed by MAD Music with the lyrics by Awais Sohail. It was sung by Athar and Ragini. Other background music are also composed by MAD Music.

Track listing
No.	Title	Singer(s)	Length
1.	"Aunn Zara"	Ather and Ragini	2:53

== Broadcast and release ==
First premiering in May 2013 on A-Plus Entertainment, the series was re-launched with enhanced marketing efforts following the appointment of Noor ul Huda Shah as the network's CEO, who recognized the show's potential. It later aired in India on Zindagi, first in 2014, and then in 2022. The series became available on ZEE5 as a video-on-demand in 2020.

== Reception ==
=== Critical reception ===
Sadaf Haider of The Express Tribune praised the series for its simplicity, and unique storytelling, and commended the performances of Osman Khalid Butt and Maya Ali, as well as Faiza Iftikhar's nuanced characters. In the year-ender list by the same newspaper, the series was voted as the Best Drama Serial (reveiwer's choice), Best Writer (reviewer and people's choice) and Best Supporting actor for Mukarram Kaleem (reviewer's choice).

Karanjeet Kaur of The Caravan praised the portrayal of the quirky families and dialogues of the series but critiques its failure to challenge traditional gender perceptions, ultimately succumbing to orthodox drama with protagonists assuming pre-ordained gender roles.

In an article published by the DAWN Images in July 2017, the series was listed among the "iconic Pakistani TV drama" and was noted for its sparkling script, skillful direction, and fabulous performances.

=== Awards and nominations ===
Year	Awards	Category	Nominee(s)/ Recipient(s)	Result	Ref.
2014	Lux Style Awards	Best TV Play	Shahzad Chaudhry	Nominated	
2014	Lux Style Awards	Best TV Director	Haissam Hussain	Nominated	
2014	Lux Style Awards	Best TV Writer	Faiza Iftikhar	Nominated	
2014	Pakistan Media Awards	Best Drama	Aunn Zara	Nominated	
2014	Pakistan Media Awards	Best Drama Director	Haissam Hussain	Nominated	
2014	Pakistan Media Awards	Best Drama Actor	Osman Khalid Butt	Nominated	
2014	Pakistan Media Awards	Best Supporting Actress	Sabreen Hisbani	Won	
