= Kaash Main Teri Beti Na Hoti =

- Written by: Kifayat Rodani
- Directed by: Syed Ali Raza Usama
- Starring: (For cast see below)
- Opening theme: Kaash Main Teri Beti Na Hoti (sung by Sanam Marvi)
- Country of origin: Pakistan
- Original language: Urdu
- No. of episodes: 210

Production
- Producers: Shahzad Naseeb; Samina Humayun Saeed
- Running time: Approx. 16–20 minutes

Original release
- Network: Geo Tv

Kaash Main Teri Beti Na Hoti (Urdu: کاش میں تیری بیٹی نہ ہوتی, English: I Wish I Was Not Your Daughter) is a Pakistani social serial which premiered on Geo TV in 2011. Written by Kifayat Rodani, the serial was directed by Syed Ali Raza Usama and co-produced by Shahzad Naseeb and Samina Humayun Saeed.

One of the longest running Pakistani drama, emerged as one of the biggest blockbuster of that era, eventually peaked at 7.3 TRP, which was highest TRP any Pakistani drama has ever gotten along with Takay Ki Aayegi Baraat which also had 7.3 TRP at that time. It was getting 5s average TRP per week.

== Synopsis ==
The story highlights the living conditions of a very poor family in Pakistan and the hardships they face to earn a living. Things are never easy for Khushi (commonly known as Pagli) and her family, with Akbar Ali (their father) selling newspapers but hardly earning anything, Zuleikha (their mother) working as a maid in a rich house but always getting insulted by the owner, while Khushi and Bano (her sister) wash car mirrors on the roads. Ummo (her brother) works in a workshop. They are in such financial condition that they often have nothing to eat. The parents worry that they cannot afford dowry for Khushi's marriage. The story takes a turn, and finally, a proposal comes for Khushi, but it is not just a marriage proposal; it is a one-year contract with selfish intentions behind it.

The story explores how the elite rich class manipulates the poor for their motives and then discards them once they are no longer needed, and the concept of money as a powerful force which can lead parents to take unethical steps.

== Cast ==
- Fatima Effendi as Khushi a.k.a. Pagli
- Danish Taimoor as Junaid Ali Shah – Khushi's husband
- Javeria Abbasi as Shanzay – Junaid's first wife
- Saleem Mairaj as Daud Ali Shah a.k.a. Shahji – Junaid's father
- Taqi Ahmed as Duraid – Junaid's younger brother
- Ismat Zaidi as Shagufta – Junaid's mother
- Salma Zafar as Zulekha – Khushi's mother
- Shakeel Hussain Khan – Asghar
- Shahid Naqvi as Akbar Ali – Khushi's father
- Zuhab Khan as Inu – Khushi's younger brother
- Minal Khan as Bano – Khushi's younger sister
- Qaiser Naqvi as Zubaida – Zulekha's friend
- Kanwar Arsalan as Farhan a.k.a. Pappu – Khushi's childhood friend
- Zhalay Sarhadi as Shammo, Khushi's neighbourhood friend

== International broadcast ==
Kaash Main Teri Beti Na Hoti was also broadcast in India on the channel Zindagi. Its first episode was telecasted on 23 June 2014, the day the channel was launched. And it become massive Blockbuster in India. The show ended its run on 6 December 2014. Zindagi ended the entire show within 159 episodes, while on Geo TV, it took 210 episodes.
