= Parchayee =

Pakistani drama television series

- Sabreen Hisbani (left) and Minal Khan
- Genre: Romance; Family
- Written by: Uzma Iftikhar
- Directed by: Asad Jabbal
- Starring: Sabreen Hisbani; Hammad Farooqui; Minal Khan
- Theme music composer: Sahir Ali Bagga
- Country of origin: Pakistan
- Original language: Urdu
- No. of seasons: 1
- No. of episodes: 30

Production
- Producer: Moomal Shunaid
- Production company: Moomal Productions

Original release
- Network: Hum TV
- Release: 22 December 2017 – 13 July 2018

Parchayee (Urdu: پرچھائیں) is a 2017 Pakistani drama serial that premiered on 22 December 2017 on Hum TV. It is directed by Asad Jabbal and written by Uzma Iftikhar. It stars Sabreen Hisbani, Minal Khan and Hammad Farooqui in lead roles. The serial is produced by Moomal Shunaid under their production company Moomal Productions with Rafay Rashdi as a managing partner.

== Cast ==
- Sabreen Hisbani as Saba
- Minal Khan as Parizay "Pari"
- Ahsan Mohsin Ikram as Haaris
- Hammad Farooqui as Saad
- Asif Raza Mir as Khawar
- Qavi Khan as Saad and Parizay's grandfather
- Fazila Kaiser as Rehana
- Hira Hussain as Shiza (dead)
- Arisha Razi as Sania
