= Humnasheen =

- Title screen on Hum Pashto 1
- Genre: Drama
- Written by: Syeda Shahla Shkoor
- Directed by: Siraj-ul-Haque
- Starring: Adnan Siddiqui; Faiza Hasan; Arij Fatyma; Rija Ali; Humayun Ashraf; Raheel Butt
- Country of origin: Pakistan
- Original language: Urdu

Production
- Producer: Momina Duraid

Original release
- Network: Hum TV
- Release: 24 February 2013

Humnasheen is a 2013 Pakistani drama television series that premiered on Hum TV on February 24, 2013. Directed by Siraj-ul-Haque and written by Syeda Shahla Shakoor, the series was produced by Momina Duraid. The cast includes Adnan Siddiqui, Faiza Hasan, Arij Fatyma, Rija Ali, Humayun Ashraf, and Raheel Butt.

The series received backlash for depicting homosexuality in an episode of the series.

== Plot ==
The story revolves around the family of Hassan Munir. Munir and Asmat Aara have been married for 15 years and are childless. Asmat Aara desires children and gets her husband married to the much younger Mehrunnisa, hoping that she would bear him the children she could not. Mehrunnisa has been engaged to Shehzad (Humayun Ashraf) and is madly in love, but her fiance is unemployed. Seeing that, Mehrunnisa's family forcefully wed her away with Hassan Munir. Mehrunnisa accepts this as fate and devotes herself to being a dutiful wife of Hassan and gives birth to his twins. Asmat Ara initially gets jealous of Mehrunnisa, but later she chooses to mother the twins and trades off her companionship with Hassan, which Mehrunnisa fills perfectly. Mehrunnisa completes her studies and gives birth to another child, whom she chooses to raise herself.

After a lapse of years, the children are grown up, and the twins Aaliya and Safeer are copies of Asmat Ara in personalities. Safeer is proud and bossy, whereas Aaliya is a classy girl. Safeer is in love with Alishba, the daughter of Najm-Uz-Zaman, a cold enemy of Hassan. Najm-uz-Zaman has left no stone unturned to beat Hassan Munir in the construction business. Asmat approves of the marriage, despite Hassan's disapproval, and after the death of Hassan, she gets Aaliya married to Saqib and Safeer married to Alishba. Things take a worse route as Safeer, under his father-in-law's influence, sells off the construction business, and starts a new business which proves to be a huge loss. Alishba also treats her in-laws in a bad manner. Meanwhile, Aaliya has to get a divorce from her husband as her husband, turns out to be gay.

Mehrunnisa and Asmat Ara are left together to pick up the shattered pieces of their life together after Hassan Munir. Asmat apologizes for all the wrongdoings she did with Mehrunnisa over the years. Shehzad reenters their lives as an ex-accomplice of Hassan and an established businessman and helps Safeer in the loss and uncovering the real culprit of the failure, who turns out to be Najam-uz-Zaman. Alishba tries to turn Safeer against Shahzad by revealing that Shahzad is Mehrunnisa's ex-fiance. But Asmat Ara takes a stand for Mehrunnisa and clarifies her position. Mehrunnisa's brother is keen on getting her married to Shahzad, as Shahzad did not get married after the failed love affair with Mehrunnisa. Mehrunnisa strongly opposes and declares her eternal love for her dead husband and vows to live with the memories of Hassan till her last breath.

== Cast ==
- Adnan Siddiqui as Hassan Munir.
- Faiza Hasan as Asmat Aara, the first wife of Hassan Munir.
- Arij Fatyma as Mehrunisa, the much younger, second wife of Hassan Munir.
- Raheel Butt as Safir, Hassan Munir's elder son.
- Alyzeh Gabol as Aliya, Hassan Munir's only daughter and the twin sister of Safeer.
- Mustafa Changazi as Uzair, Hassan Munir's youngest son.
- Sarah Khan as Sara, Mehrunisa's niece and Uzair's girlfriend, later becomes his wife.
- Jinaan Hussain as Alishba, Safir's wife.
- Tabbasum Arif as Khalda
- Muneeb Butt as Saqib, Ex-husband of Aliya
- Behroze Sabzwari
- Sabahat Ali Bukhari as Alishba's mother, Safir's mother-in-law.
- Humayun Ashraf as Shehzad
- Qaiser Naqvi as Mehrunissa's mother
- Birjees Farooqui as Abida
- Rija Ali
- Amir Qureshi

== Broadcast ==
The show was telecast on Indian channel Zindagi from 13 April 2015 under the title Kabhi Aashna Kabhi Ajnabi.

== Reception ==
=== Critical reception ===
A reviewer from the Firstpost panned the series for its implausible plot, where a childless woman arranges for her husband to marry a younger woman to produce an heir.
