= Qadam Qadam Ishq =

Pakistani television series

- Genre: Drama series
- Written by: Adil Hafeez
- Directed by: Kashif Saleem
- Starring: Azfar Rehman; Areeba Habib; Ayesha Gul
- Country of origin: Pakistan
- Original language: Urdu
- No. of seasons: 1
- No. of episodes: 29

Production
- Producer: A-Plus Entertainment
- Running time: Approx 40 Minutes

Original release
- Network: A-Plus TV
- Release: 4 January – 28 July 2019

Qadam Qadam Ishq (Urdu: قدم قدم عشق, lit. 'Love at Every Step') was a 2019 Pakistani drama serial that premiered on A-Plus TV. It was directed by Kashif Saleem and written by Adil Hafeez. It featured Azfar Rehman and Areeba Habib.

== Cast ==
- Azfar Rehman as Raheel
- Areeba Habib as Chand
- Alyy Khan as Aftab, Chand's brother
- Maira Khan as Chand's sister-in-law
- Ayesha Gul as Hadia
- Yasir Ali Khan as Sikander

== Production ==
“This is a very different role than the one I've done before and this one is a challenge as Chand is completely different from my personality but I love her simplicity.”

— Areeba Habib

The show was first named Adhura Alvida.
