= Tum Mere Paas Raho =

- Title screen
- Genre: Drama; Romance
- Written by: Inam Hasan
- Directed by: Saife Hassan
- Starring: Arij Fatyma; Zahid Ahmed, Saba Faisal; Amna Ilyas; Bushra Ansari
- Opening theme: "Tum Mere Paas Raho"; Singer(s); Zeb Bangash; Lyrics by Sabir Zafar
- Composer: Waqar Ali
- Country of origin: Pakistan
- Original language: Urdu
- No. of episodes: 20

Production
- Producer: Momina Duraid
- Running time: 30–45 minutes

Original release
- Network: Hum TV
- Release: 22 July – 2 December 2015

Tum Mere Paas Raho; (English: Stay Close To Me) is a 2015 Pakistani romantic drama serial written by Inam Hasan for Hum TV. The series is directed by Saife Hassan and produced by Momina Duraid. It stars Arij Fatyma, Zahid Ahmed, Saba Faisal, Bushra Ansari, Muhammad Mukhtar, Amna Ilyas, Hassan Niazi, Mairaj and Aisha Khan (Senior). The drama airs every Wednesday at 8pm.

== Synopsis ==
Rabia & Ahmed at long last find happiness when they adopt a child named Tabish. As the time passes, Rabia becomes overprotective with the child while Ahmed starts dictating the life of Tabish. Tabish's possessive mother refuses to let him marry the girl he likes as she is scared that she will lose him. Though she bows to his wishes, she is still reluctant to accept her soon to be daughter-in-law.

== Cast ==
- Arij Fatyma as Zoya
- Zahid Ahmed as Tabish
- Amna Ilyas as Mariam
- Saba Faisal as Tabish's birth mother
- Bushra Ansari as Tabish's adopting mother
- Muhammad Mukhtar
- Hassan Niazi as Tariq
- Birjees Farooqui as Salma
- Saleem Mairaj
- Ayesha Khan

== Broadcast and availability ==
- It was aired on Hum Europe in UK, on Hum World in Canda, USA and Australia and Hum TV Mena in the UAE with same time slot and premiere date. All International broadcasting aired the series in accordance with their standard times.
- The show was aired on MBC 2premiering 29 January 2019 and aired every Monday - Friday 16:30.
- Tum Mere Pass Raho is available on Eros Now app to stream online
