= Sabreen Hisbani =

Pakistani actress

- صابرين حسباني
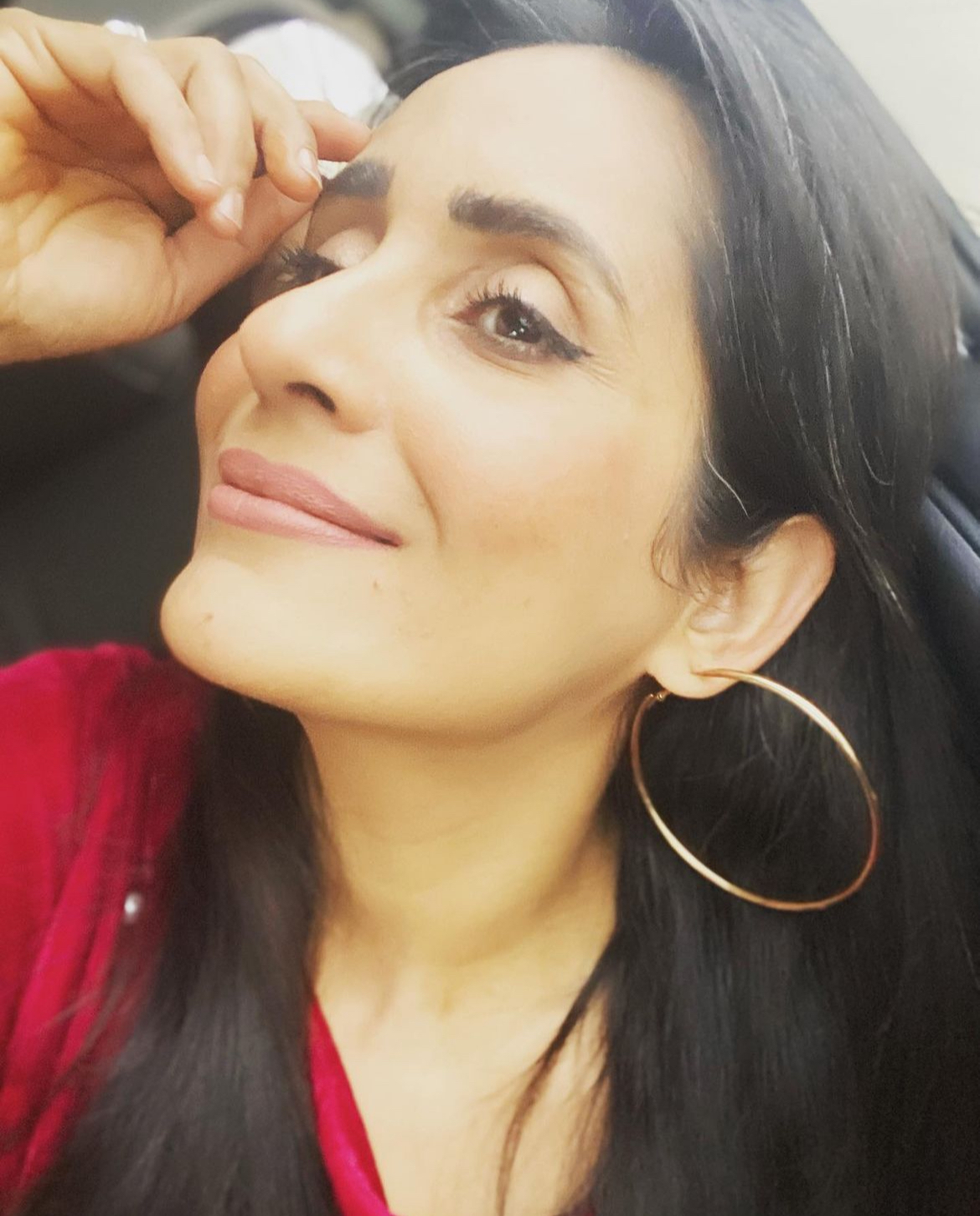
- Hisbani in 2023
- Born: Sabreen Hisbani Baloch; 10 September 1978 (age 48); Karachi, Sindh, Pakistan
- Other names: Sabreen Heesbani; Saba
- Education: University of Karachi
- Occupation: Actress
- Years active: 2005–present
- Notable work: Aunn Zara; Mohabbat Tumse Nafrat Hai; Parchayee
- Height: 5 ft 4 in (163 cm)
- Children: 1
- Relatives: Sanam Baloch (sister)
- Awards: Pakistan Media Awards

Sabreen Hisbani Baloch (Urdu: سبرین حسبانی; Sindhi: صابرين حسباني; born 10 September 1978) is a Pakistani-Canadian actress. She also has worked in several acclaimed drama serials including Kitni Girhain Baaki Hain, Nikhar Gaye Gulab Sare, Saat Pardon Mein, Sanjha, Aunn Zara, and Laa. With the former two earned her a widespread acclaim and recognition. She was nominated as a Best Supporting Actress at 3rd Hum Awards for Laa while she won the award at 4th Pakistan Media Awards for Aunn Zara in the same category.

In 2024, Sabreen Hisbani made her debut in live theatre with a Sindhi play titled Salgirah. The production explored the emotional landscape of a couple in a long-term marriage who, after years of routine, confront their unmet expectations and societal pressures. She performed in a sold-out show that received high praise from fans. The performance took place at the Arts Council Karachi on 17 October 2024.

== Early life ==
Sabreen was born on 10 September 1978, in Karachi, to Maria and Ghulam Murtaza Baloch. Her mother was a Lok Sindhi singer. She has two sisters and two brothers, who include famous host and acclaimed actress Sanam Baloch. She was a flight attendant for PIA then began her career in 2005 in the PTV drama serial Masuri, which gives her wide acclaim, she successfully established herself as an actress in industry. Since she has appeared in drama serials, sitcoms, telefims and has appeared on number of talk shows and programs. In addition she hosted the 17th PTV Karachi Center Awards.

== Career ==
=== 2005–2012: Early acting roles ===
Sabreen made her acting debut in Masuri (2005) as a recurring role, for which she was nominated for the Lux Style Award for Best Television Actress. Later in 2008, she got a big breakthrough with the Geo TV Soap opera Meri Adhoori Mohabbat (2008) starring alongside Humayun Saeed. The soap became a massive hit in the networks history. For the next couple of years, Sabreen continued starring in telefilms, and recurring roles.

=== 2013–2019: Mainstream success ===
In the 2013 series, Aunn Zara, Hisbani plays Nighat, Aunn's protective Phupho. In the series, Sabreen plays a supporting role in an ensemble cast. Her performance was critically acclaimed and she won the Pakistan Media Award for Best Supporting Actress. The show earned her a respectful place in the industry. The same year, Sabreen would go on to do another massive hit Meri Beti (2013–2014) for ARY Digital. Both Aunn Zara and Meri Beti would go on to be instant classics that are still known as some of Pakistan's best television shows.

In the 13 episode Hum TV Miniseries, Laa (2014), Sabreen portrayed Laila. The series was nominated for multiple awards, and Sabreen herself was nominated for the 2014 Hum Award for Best Supporting Actress. Later in the years Sabreen continued to star in series such as Mera Dard Na Janay Koi (2015–2016), Mujhe Kucch Kehna Hai (2015–2016), and Mubarak Ho Beti Hui Hai (2017).

In 2017, Sabreen became a recurring role in Mohabbat Tumse Nafrat Hai, and later that year, she starred in Gumrah (2017–2018) and Parchayee (2017–2018). Both shows were airing back-to-back on the same network, Hum TV. Both were very successful for the network and gained positive reviews from the audience.

On 9 February 2018, Sabreen's debut film, Azad (2018). Azad is a melodrama film directed and written by Rehan Sheikh, who co-produced with Hasan Naeem under the production banner of Bling Studios and Roomi Films. The film features Sabreen Hisbani, Sanam Saeed, Salman Shahid, Rehan Sheikh, Nimra Bucha and Zahid Ahmed, and Sajjad Kishwar.

In early 2019, it was announced that Sabreen Hisbani and Alyy Khan were going to be starring in an upcoming Geo TV series, Saibaan. The first episode aired on 3 March 2019. Later that year, Mujhe Beta Chahiye was released on A-Plus TV. The series ended in December 2019.

In 2020, Sabreen made an Instagram account and shared posts that confirmed she had moved to Canada. She has stayed active on social media since then. Later in the year, It was rumored that Sabreen had left the industry overall and has moved on to pursue other ventures. Sabreen continued to update fans on her life using Instagram for years after.

=== 2024–present: Media comeback ===
On 3 July 2024, Sabreen Hisbani and Umer Alam shared a post on Instagram of them together. The caption reads, "Fortunate enough to share screen with Sabreen Hisbani. In our new Project for Hum TV, who’s making a comeback after 4 years, produced by MD Productions."

The post confirms that Sabreen is returning to Pakistani Television in her new project for Hum TV. The title, characters, and full cast list is yet to be announced. Filming in currently underway in Karachi, Pakistan and the series is set to release later this year.

== Filmography ==
=== Film ===
Year	Film	Role	Notes
2018	Azad		Hum Films

=== Television ===
Year	Serial	Role	Notes
2004	Bali		Lead Role
2005	Masuri		Recurring Role
2008	Meri Adhoori Mohabbat		Lead Role
2009	Yeh Hindustan Wo Pakistan		Main Role
2009	Dohri		Main Role
2009	Phir Kho Jaye Na		Main Role; ARY Digital serial
2009	Tum Se Kaisey Kahoon		Main Role
2010	Bichernay Se Pehlay		Lead Role
2011	Mohabbat Haar Mohabbat Jeet		Lead Role
2011	Kaafir		Recurring Role; ARY Digital serial
2011	Kitni Girhain Baaki Hain		Episode: "Episode 20"; Hum TV Anthology series
2011	Nangay Paon Zindagi		Hum Tv - Telefilm
2012	Hum Pay Jo Guzarti Hai		Main Role; Express Entertainment
2012	Saat Pardon Mein		Main Role; Har Pal Geo serial
2012	Nikhar Gaye Gulab Sare		Main Role; Hum TV serial
2012	Pathjar Ke Baad		Recurring Role; Urdu 1 serial
2013	Sanjha		Main Role; Hum TV serial
2013	Aunn Zara	Phuppo	Main Role; Won - Pakistan Media Award for Best Supporting Actress
2013	Meri Beti		Lead Role; Popular ARY Digital serial
2014	Soteli		Main Role; ARY Digital serial
2014	LAA	Laila	Lead Role; Nominated - Hum Award for Best Supporting Actress
2014	Pyar Hai Tu Mera		Lead Role; Hum Sitaray serial
2014	Ek Mohabbat Ke Baad		Lead Role; ARY Digital serial
2015	Pathjar Ke Baad		Recurring Role; Urdu 1 serial
2015	Choti Si Ghalat Fehmi		Recurring Role; Daily soap on Hum TV
2015	Tere Dar Per	Aqeela	Lead Role; ARY Digital series
2015	Judaai		Lead Role; Har Pal Geo serial
2015	Mera Dard Na Janay Koi		Lead Role; daily soap on Hum TV
2015	Mujhe Kuch Kehna Hai		Main Role; Har Pal Geo serial
2015	Dooriyan		Lead Role; Hum Sitaray serial
2016	Jiska Naam Hai Aurat		Lead Role; A-Plus TV and ATV (Pakistani TV channel)
2016	Izn-e-Rukhsat		Lead Role; Har Pal Geo
2017	Mubarak Ho Beti Hui Hai	Anila	Main Role; ARY Digital serial
2017	Mohabbat Tumse Nafrat Hai	Neelam	Recurring Role; Har Pal Geo
2017	Gumrah	Asma	Main Role; Hum TV
2017	Parchayee	Saba	Lead Role; Hum TV serial
2017	Kitni Girhain Baaki Hain (Season 2)	Munni's Mother	Episode: "Episode 20" on Hum TV
2017	Masoom	Arooba	Lead Role; Express Entertainment
2019	Saibaan	Anum	Lead Role; Daily soap on Har Pal Geo
2019	Mujhe Beta Chahiye	Rubina	Lead Role; A-Plus TV serial
2024	BOL Kahani	Guest Role; Anthology series on BOL Network	Episode: "Kala Saya" on BOL Network
2024	Mohabbat Reza Reza	Riffat	Lead Role; Hum TV serial
2025	Judwaa	Shazia	Main Role; Hum TV serial
2025	Inteha	Nousheen	Lead Role; ARY Digital serial

=== Television Film ===
Year	Title	Production	Notes
N/A	Nau Main Dariya		Main Role
N/A	Tum Se Kaise Kahoon		Main Role
N/A	Cheel		Main Role
2010	Khurchan	ARY Digital Network	Lead Role
2013	Emaan	ARY Digital Network	Lead Role
2013	Patli Gali	Hum TV	Lead Role
2013	Dilli Walay Dulhare Babu	ARY Digital Network	Lead Role
2015	Sare Zameen Per	TV One	Main Role
2016	Aashiq Colony	ARY Digital Network	Main Role
2016	Van Waley Mehboob Bhai	ARY Digital Network	Main Role

=== Music Videos ===
- "Ghum Jo Fasano" (2003), by Maria Baloch

== Theatre ==
Year(s)	Production	Role	Location
2024	Salgirah	Wife	Arts Council Karachi

== Awards and nominations ==
Award	Year	Category	Nominated work	Result
Lux Style Awards	2005	Lux Style Award for Best Television Actress	Masuri	Nominated
Pakistan Media Awards	2013	Pakistan Media Award for Best Supporting Actress	Aunn Zara	Won
Hum Awards	2015	Hum Award for Best Supporting Actress	Laa	Nominated
