= Arij Fatyma =

Pakistani television actress and vlogger (born 1989)

- Born: Aribah Fatima Jafri; 7 November 1989 (age 36); Greensboro, North Carolina, U.S.
- Occupation: Actress
- Years active: 2012–present
- Spouses: Faraz Khan (m. 2014; div. 2014); Ozair Ali (m. 2017)

Arij Fatyma (Urdu: اریج فاطمہ; born Aribah Fatima Jafri on 7 November 1989) is an American-Pakistani television actress and influencer who is active in the Urdu television industry.

Fatyma made her acting debut with a leading role in the 2012 Geo TV serial Kis Din Mera Viyah Howay Ga 2, and subsequently gained success with the following series Mar Jain Bhi To Kya (2012), Humnasheen (2013), Woh (2013), Kissey Apna Kahein (2014), Aik Pal (2015), Ishq Parast (2015), Aap Ke Liye (2016) and Yaar-e-Bewafa (2017). After a two-year break from acting, Fatyma returned to television with the ARY Digital's family drama Hasad (2019).

== Personal life ==
Fatyma was born in North Carolina, U.S. to Syed Jafri and Mehreen Jafri Syed. She has two brothers, physician Syed Qasim and entrepreneur Syed Qadir Jafri. The family relocated to Karachi in 2005. She obtained second position in Board of Secondary Education throughout Karachi in her matriculation exams in 2005.

Fatyma first married businessman Faraz Khan in January 2014 and the couple divorced the same year. Her second marriage was to Canada-based Pakistani physician Ozair Ali. The ceremony was held in Karachi, Pakistan in 2017. Fatyma is currently settled in Michigan, U.S., along with her husband. The couple have two sons, Isa and Yahya. Fatyma frequently visited Pakistan for her acting shoots and continues to appear in projects after the marriage.

== Career ==
Fatyma began her career as a commercial model and started appearing in advertisements. After working as a model for a few months, she was offered a comic role in the 2012 Geo TV sitcom Kis Din Mera Viyah Howay Ga 2. The series proved to be the breakthrough for her. She then starred in leading roles in several successful television series, including the melodramas Mar Jain Bhi To Kya (2012) and Paree (2013), the romance Kissey Apna Kahein (2014), and the religious drama Aik Pal (2015). She then played an obsessed lover in the romantic drama Aik Pagal Si Larki (2013) and a young faithful wife in the family drama Hum Nasheen (2013); the former earned her a Best Soap Actress award and the later earned her a Best Supporting Actress nomination at Hum Awards. Fatyma subsequently received widespread critical appraisal for portraying leading roles in the dramas Khilona (2015), Ishq Parast (2015), Aap Ke Liye (2016) and Yaar-e-Bewafa (2017). Besides acting, she serves as an ambassador for a number of brands such as Lipton Tea, Mobilink, Cadbury Perk and Nestle Cerelac.

== Filmography ==
Key
| † | denotes film / series that has not released yet |

=== Television ===
| Year | Title | Role | Notes |
|---|---|---|---|
| 2012 | Kis Din Mera Viyah Howay Ga 2 | Millie | |
| 2012 | Hazaron Saal | Rida | |
| 2012 | Sabz Qadam | Shanza | |
| 2012 | Sabz Pari Laal Kabootar | Maleeha (Millie) | |
| 2012 | Mahi Ayega | Rabab | Ramadan special series |
| 2012–2013 | Mar Jain Bhi To Kya | Nausheen | Nominated—Hum Award for Best Soap Actress |
| 2013 | Pari | Sadaf | |
| 2013 | Hum Nasheen | Mehrunissa | Nominated—Hum Award for Best Supporting Actress |
| 2013 | Ek Pagal Si Larki | Roomi | Hum Award for Best Soap Actress |
| 2013 | Woh | Meher | |
| 2013 | Gumaan | Zarish | |
| 2013–2014 | Meri Beti | Iraj | |
| 2014 | Kitni Girhain Baaki Hain | Recurring | |
| 2014 | Teri Ulfat Mein | Mishal (Mishi) | |
| 2014 | Kissey Apna Kahein | Aleezay | |
| 2014–2015 | Aik Pal | Bareera | |
| 2015 | Khilona | Hira | |
| 2015 | Jeena Dushwar Sahi | Sara | |
| 2015 | Ishq Parast | Arsla | |
| 2015 | Kitna Satatay Ho | Amna | |
| 2015 | Tum Mere Paas Raho | Zoya | |
| 2016 | Inteqaam | Aiza | |
| 2016 | Dil Haari | Muqadass | |
| 2016 | Aap Ke Liye | Washma | |
| 2017 | Hiddat | Nimra | |
| 2017 | Yaar-e-Bewafa | Fiza | |
| 2017 | Dil-e-Bekhabar | Gulnaaz | |
| 2019 | Gustakh Dil | Sitara | |
| 2019 | Hasad | Zareen (Zari) | |

=== Short films ===
| Year | Title | Role | Notes |
|---|---|---|---|
| 2017 | Desi Girl Videsi Babu | Rushna | |
