= Jalan (TV series) =

Pakistani television series

- Official title card
- Genre: Romance; Drama
- Written by: Sidra Sehar Imran
- Directed by: Aabis Raza
- Starring: Minal Khan; Areeba Habib; Emmad Irfani; Fahad Shaikh
- Theme music composer: SK Salman Khan; Deniss Tanveer; Sk Studio
- Opening theme: "Bhoolne Ki Koshish Karna" by Rahat Fateh Ali Khan
- Composer: SK Salman Khan
- Country of origin: Pakistan
- Original language: Urdu
- No. of seasons: 1
- No. of episodes: 31

Production
- Producers: Fahad Mustafa; Dr. Ali Kazmi
- Production location: Karachi
- Camera setup: Multi-camera setup
- Production company: Big Bang Entertainment

Original release
- Network: ARY Digital
- Release: 17 June – 16 December 2020

Jalan (Urdu: جلن, lit. 'Jealousy') is a Pakistani television series premiered on ARY Digital on 17 June 2020. It is directed by Aabis Raza and produced by Fahad Mustafa and Dr. Ali Kazmi under Big Bang Entertainment. It stars Minal Khan, Areeba Habib, Emmad Irfani and Fahad Sheikh. The first teaser of the series premiered on 3 June 2020.

The serial received huge criticism due to its misogynistic and regressive approach.

== Plot ==
Nisha (Minal Khan) and Misha aka Meenu (Areeba Habib) are sisters hailing from a middle-class background. Nisha is a selfish girl who is used to snatching better things from her sister which Misha gives her happily. Nisha likes her cousin Ahmer (Fahad Sheikh) who loves her intensely and becomes engaged to her. Later Asfandyar's (Emaad Irfani) proposal comes for Meenu. Seeing that Asfandyar comes from a rich and elite background, Nisha becomes jealous of her sister and tries to point out flaws in him, but he and Misha eventually get married, much to Nisha's distaste.

Nisha, seeing her sister's expensive gifts and big house, tries to break her engagement with Ahmer, behaving rudely with him in the process. Both of their families and Ahmer disagree, and instead set the wedding date. Nisha starts plotting her evil plans and makes Ahmer look bad in front of her parents by accusing him of bringing a knife to kill her, leading to their engagement being broken off, while she also tries to come closer to Asfandyar, trying to manipulate him.

Ahmer confronts Nisha with Asfandyar in a mall, where Asfand is seen holding Nisha's hand. Misha asks Ahmer to go away and never come back. Ahmer tries to tell Misha about Nisha's character, but she ignores him. Nisha comes back home and tells this to her parents. They call Ahmer's mother and ask her to keep Ahmer away from Nisha. Ahmer's mother passes away.

Tanveer (Nisha's father) and Sajeela (Nisha's mother) go to Lahore to attend her funeral and leave Nisha at Asfand's home as they think it is inappropriate for Nisha to go there. Nisha tries to get closer to Asfand, standing very close to him, going places without Misha and many more plans. Asfand also shamelessly falls in love with her.

Upon returning from another city, Nisha's parents go to pick Nisha and take her home, but she refuses, her father forces her and Meenu also asks her to leave, so she unwillingly goes. Meanwhile, Misha finds out she is pregnant. Soon, Ahmer is forced into a wedding with Areej who loves him. Nisha then continues to separate her sister from Asfand, who shamelessly falls in love with her and thinks about divorcing Meenu. One day, Misha finds out about their affair, she throws Nisha out of their house and gets ill and is shifted to the hospital, where Nisha's parents eavesdrop Nisha and Asfand flirting.

Nisha is forced to marry one of her cousins, but she runs away from her house and goes to Asfand's house where he welcomes her. A while later, Asfand's sister Kinza comes to Pakistan to visit him and sees Nisha with him in his house. His sister demands him to go and get Meenu from her home as she went to her home after getting discharged from the hospital, but he didn't and Kinza goes herself to pick Meenu and finds out about Nisha and Asfand's relationship. Kinza slaps Asfand for his betrayal and calls him disloyal, which ends up in Asfand divorcing Misha in front of her family and Nisha, where Misha faints and is taken to the hospital, where she gives birth to her son, Hadi Asfandyar.

Menu tries to get in contact with Ahmer to apologize for everything that happened, since she has realized Nisha was as bad as Ahmer described her, but he is in London for work, so his wife Areej picks up, which is a surprise to Misha who doesn't know Ahmer was married. Areej passes on to him that Meenu wants to apologize.

After the birth of her son, Nisha calls Meenu about her upcoming nikkah with Asfand and tells her that if she comes, she should come without her son. Meenu sits there and recalls her memories, spotting a container with gasoline in the room. She ignites a fire on the balcony and jumps into it, in an attempt to end her life. Nisha and Asfand are married, after which Kinza announces that she will separate her part of the family's business and property shares.

The unfortunate events continue for Misha's family, as Misha dies in the hospital. Ahmer tells himself that he will never forgive Nisha and Asfand after all the things they did to Meenu. Asfand and Nisha go on a honeymoon where Nisha finds out about Misha's death but does not care instead becomes happy. Asfand finds out about it as her sister Kinza was distributing zakat among the poor and needy. Asfand starts to see through the greedy side of Nisha after she accuses him of cheating with her because his sister has 51% of the property and business. He begins to regret the things he did to Meenu. Ahmer returns to Nisha's life after becoming rich and is still cold-hearted towards Areej.

Ahmer also meets Hadi, Misha's son. Ahmer invites Nisha to his house where he almost falls for her when Areej walks into Nisha and Ahmer and becomes angry at her husband and leaves but Ahmer stops her. Ahmer realizes that Nisha is pure evil and Areej sincerely loves him which also makes Ahmer fall for his wife Areej. On the other hand, Nisha gets pregnant but aborts the baby which ended up in Asfand trying to kill Nisha for aborting their child. Kinza comes to wish Asfand on his birthday and found them fighting, Nisha shouts at Asfand and reveals to Asfand why did she abort the baby and asks for a divorce. Asfand blames Ahmer for Nisha's actions and throws her out of his house. Nisha calls Asfand disloyal and a characterless man as he shamelessly fell in love with Nisha and ignoring the women he once loved, Meenu. Asfand regrets what he did to Misha. Ahmer introduces Areej in front of Nisha's parents. They forgive Ahmer and ask for forgiveness for what they did to him. Nisha's father, on the other hand, dies from Nisha's betrayal, recalling both sisters' childhood and what Nisha did. On the other hand, Nisha is doing all possible things to separate Areej from Ahmer.

But when Nisha tried to attack Areej, Ahmer decides to go back to Lahore to keep Areej safe, calling Nisha to be mentally disabled. Nisha was now alone and was seeing Misha's Ghost constantly. Asfand recalls Misha's memories and claims to be disloyal to Misha and thinks he should die. Kinza asks Sabra(their maid) to burn Nisha's belongings. She also decides to take Asfand to Canada along with her, but she finds him dead while reciting namaz/prayers. Nisha drives out of the house in fear and is badly burnt in a car accident and lost all the complexion and beauty she had earlier. Ahmer and the whole family celebrates the prediction of a newborn of Ahmer and Areej. Nisha's mother now lives with Ahmer and his family. Nisha is then shifted to a women’s shelter home as her family had disowned her. The show ends with two ladies talking about Nisha's deeds and Kinza visiting Asfand and Misha's grave.

== Cast ==
- Minal Khan as Nisha Asfandyar Khan (nee Tanveer) - Tanveer & Sajeela's younger daughter; Misha's younger sister; Ahmer's ex fiancée; Asfandyar's widow.
- Emmad Irfani as Asfandyar Khan - Kinza's younger brother; Shehryar's younger son; Misha's ex husband; Nisha's husband; Hadi's father. (Dead)
- Fahad Sheikh as Ahmer Aziz - Aziz and Tahoora's younger son; Humaira's younger brother; Nisha's ex fiance; Areej's husband.
- Areeba Habib as Misha "Meenu" Tanveer - Tanveer & Sajeela's elder daughter; Nisha's elder sister; Asfandyar's ex-wife; and Haadi's mother. (Dead)
- Hajra Yamin as Areej Ahmer - Ahmer's wife; Azeem's sister.
- Maira Khan as Humaira Azeem (nee Aziz) - Aziz and Tahoora's older daughter; Ahmer's older sister; Azeem's wife.
- Nadia Hussain as Kinza Junaid (nee Khan) - Asfandyar's older sister; Shehryar's older daughter; Junaid's wife.
- Mohammad Ahmed as Tanveer Ahmed - Sajeela's husband; Nisha and Misha's father. (Dead)
- Sajida Syed as Sajeela Tanveer - Tanveer's widow; Aziz's sister; Nisha & Misha's mother.
- Sabiha Hashmi as Tahoora Aziz - Aziz's widow; Humaira & Ahmer's mother.

== Production ==
In November 2019, it was announced that Minal Khan, Areeba Habib, and Emmad Irfani were collaborating on the project. As Khan appeared as an antagonist for the first time in her career, she commented that through playing the character of Nisha, she hoped to "bring versatility to her work".

=== Release ===
On 5 June 2020, Khan announced in an Instagram post that the serial would premiere on 17 June on ARY Digital.

== Reception ==
=== Awards and nominations ===
Date of ceremony	Award	Category	Recipient(s) and nominee(s)	Result	References
March 2021	ARY People's Choice Awards	Favorite Drama Serial- Regular	Jalan	Nominated	
March 2021	ARY People's Choice Awards	Favorite OST	Rahat Fateh Ali Khan	Nominated	
March 2021	ARY People's Choice Awards	Favorite Director	Aabis Raza	Nominated	
March 2021	ARY People's Choice Awards	Favorite Writer	Sidra Saher Imran	Nominated	
March 2021	ARY People's Choice Awards	Favorite Actor	Emaad Irfani	Nominated	
March 2021	ARY People's Choice Awards	Favorite Actress	Minal Khan	Nominated	
March 2021	ARY People's Choice Awards	Favorite Actress in a role of Wife	Areeba Habib	Won	
March 2021	ARY People's Choice Awards	Favorite Actress in a role of Behen	Areeba Habib	Nominated	
March 2021	ARY People's Choice Awards	Favorite Actress in a role of Nand	Nadia Hussain	Nominated	

== Controversy ==
Jalan met with extreme negativity right when the initial teasers were released. The storyline of a girl going for her own brother-in-law was quite controversial and people began criticizing the serial. After giving few warnings regarding the show, PEMRA (Pakistan Electronic Media Regulation Authority) decided to ban the drama. The show was unbanned after a week and ARY Digital again started to air the show regularly. People said this show was taking the youth in the wrong direction, and felt this show could ruin the society. Many also called Jalan's entire story predictable but also admitted the viewers are hooked onto this show. Some people went as far as to bash Minal Khan with disgusting and derogatory terms, but Minal Khan brushed off the hate by saying "If I say I wasn't expecting the backlash I’d be lying.. I knew it'll affect my personal life. People bash you personally". The show started with lower ratings and views due to the negativity surrounding the series but many began to praise the execution and high production value, as well as the acting done by the cast. The show started getting higher ratings and regularly topped the ratings and on YouTube, it began grabbing millions of views in hours internationally. It has gotten a lot of fame and recognition and despite criticism still intact for the serial, it has gone up in audience consumption heavily.
