= Faiza Hasan =

Pakistani actress

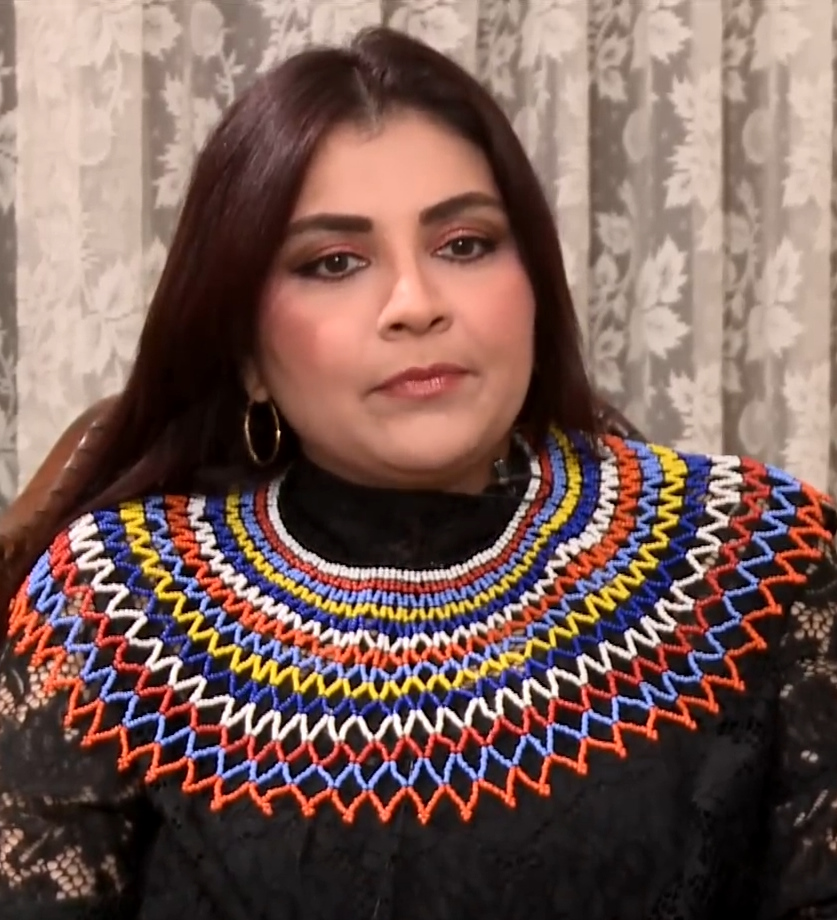
- Faiza Hasan in 2020
- Born: Faiza Hasan; 5 January 1982 (age 44); Karachi, Sindh, Pakistan
- Education: Khatoon-e-Pakistan Government Degree College For Women
- Occupations: Actress; Model; Producer
- Years active: 1999 – present
- Spouse: Mubasher Hamayoun (m. 2007)
- Children: 2

Faiza Hasan (born 5 January 1982) is a Pakistani actress and producer. She played the leading roles in the television adaptations of Umera Ahmad's Darbar-e-Dil, La Hasil and Wajood-E-Laraib and gained prominence with her title role in 2020 soap opera Nand. She played a supporting role of Farhana in 2018 film Load Wedding as well.

== Early life ==
Faiza was born on 5 January 1982 in Karachi, Pakistan. She completed her studies from Khatoon-e-Pakistan Government Degree College for Women. She did B.A. in English literature and later completed her masters in both English and Urdu literature.

== Career ==
Faiza started working as a model and worked in several commercials. In 2001, Faiza appeared in drama Sahil Ki Tamana on PTV which was offered to her by Kazim Pasha. After that she appeared in dramas on PTV and noted for her roles in Tootay Khwab, Mah E Neem Shab, 86 Lekin and Darbar-e-Dil, Wajood-E-Lariab. She also appeared in dramas Amma Aur Gulnaz, Humnasheen and Izn-e-Rukhsat. She also appeared in telefilms. In 2018 she appeared in movie Load Wedding as Farhana. In 2020 she appeared in drama Nand as Gohar.

== Personal life ==
Faiza is married to Mubasher Hamayoun since 2007. She has two children - a son named Suleman Humayun and a daughter named Jahan Ara.

== Filmography ==
=== Television ===
Year	Title	Role	Network
2001	Sahil Ki Tamana	Lubna	PTV
2004	Tootay Khwab	Humera	PTV
2005	Mah-E-Neem Shab	Khadija	PTV
2005	Darbar-e-Dil	Meher	PTV
2005	La Hasil	Maryam	Hum TV
2005	Wajood-E-Lariab	Washma	Indus TV
2006	Manzil	Sobia	ARY Digital
2008	Meherbaan House	Uzma	PTV
2011	Extras: The Mango People	Shakeela	Hum TV
2011	Amma Aur Gulnaz	Gulnaz	Geo Entertainment
2011	Kitni Girhain Baaki Hain	Zarmina	Hum TV
2012	Jazeera	Sadia	Urdu 1
2013	Humnasheen	Asmat Aara	Hum TV
2014	Mah-Para	Munazzah	PTV
2014	Main Na Manu Haar	Deena Begum	Hum TV
2015	Shareek-e-Hayat	Mariam	Hum TV
2016	Bin Roye	Singer	Hum TV
2016	Izn-e-Rukhsat	Tehreem	Geo TV
2017	Saathiya	Aila Hashmi	TV One
2018	Mazaaq Raat	Herself	Dunya TV
2018	Kho Gaya Woh	Ambreen	Bol Entertainment
2020	Nand	Gohar	ARY Digital
2021	Rangeelay Hum	Zeba	SAB TV
2023	Tere Aany Se	Sweetie	Geo Entertainment
2023	Mohabbat Satrangi	Jahan Ara	Green Entertainment
2024	Jaan Se Pyara Juni	Safina	Hum TV
2024	Aapa Shameem	Shameem	Ary Digital
2025	Pheli Barish	Dania	Geo TV
2026	Tum Larkay Bhi Na	Uroosa	Hum TV

=== Telefilm ===
Year	Title	Role
2007	Ek Adhuri Si Maa	Guriya
2008	Raiya	Razia
2009	Yeh Kahani Nahi	Fehmida
2009	Burns Road Ki Neelofar	Neelofar
2010	Lekin Aik Baat Hai	Naheed
2010	Kaun Qamar Ara	Naila
2011	Romance Of Ranchore Line	Nunhi
2011	Pichal Pairiyaan	Beena
2011	O Meri Ammo	Sweetie's mother
2013	Maa Duty Per Hai	Nazo
2019	Mizaji E Khuda	Ana

=== Film ===
Year	Title	Role
2012	Jo Miley Thori Fursat	Falahat Ali
2015	Bin Roye	Singer
2018	Load Wedding	Farhana
2022	Mere Sapnon Ki Rani	Munne's mother
2024	Na Baligh Afraad	Gulnaz
2025	Panna	Shehnaz
2026	Elaichi Loung Aur Saunf	Talat

== Awards and nominations ==
Year	Award	Category	Result	Title	Ref.
2005	1st Indus Drama Awards	Best Actress Serial	Nominated	Wujood-e-Laraib	
2010	Hum Awards	Golden Telefilm Award	Won	Kaun Qamar Ara	
2011	Hum Awards	The Silver Telefilm Award	Won	Kaun Qamar Ara	
2014	13th Hum Awards	Best Actor in a Negative Role	Nominated	Humnasheen	
2019	5th Galaxy Lollywood Awards	Best Supporting Actress	Nominated	Load Wedding	
2021	ARY People's Choice Awards	Favorite Actress	Nominated	Nand	
2021	ARY People's Choice Awards	Favorite Actor in a role of Nand	Nominated	Nand	
