= Emmad Irfani =

Pakistani actor (born 1980)

- عماد عرفانی
- Born: 29 April 1980 (age 46); Peshawar, Khyber Pakhtunkhwa, Pakistan
- Occupation: Actor
- Years active: 2000–present
- Relatives: Muhammad Iqbal (great-granduncle); Farjad Nabi (cousin)

Emmad Irfani (Urdu: عماد عرفانی) is a Pakistani actor who started his career as a model. He has done lead roles in TV serials from Geo Entertainment, ARY Digital and Hum TV. As a fashion model, he has worked with national and international brands.

== Early and personal life ==
Of Kashmiri descent, Irfani belongs to a family of military background, and has been in almost all areas of Pakistan during his father's various postings until he retired and settled in Lahore. He did his Graduation and Masters from Lahore.

His great-grandmother was the sister of philosopher-poet Muhammad Iqbal, considered the spiritual founder of Pakistan. Filmmaker Farjad Nabi is his cousin.

In 2010, he married fashion designer Maryam Shafaat, whose sister is model Amina Shafaat. They have a daughter and also had a son, Zaviyar, who died at a young age in 2023 in an accident.

== Career ==
=== Model ===
Irfani was forced into modelling by his aunt in 2000. He won Best Male model awards at the Lux Style Awards and MTV Pakistan style awards, and subsequently was nominated in 2006 and 2007.

=== Actor ===
Considering Bollywood actor Arjun Rampal to be his inspiration, in 2013 he started focusing on acting and since then has worked for many TV serials on different channels, including Geo TV, ARY Digital and Hum TV.

In 2018 he launched his film career with a cameo role in his cousin Farjad Nabi's film 7 Din Mohabbat In and his debut lead role in the upcoming film Aasmaan Bolay Ga directed by Shoaib Mansoor.

== Filmography ==
=== Films ===
Key
†	Denotes films that have not yet been released

Year	Title	Role	Director	Notes	Ref(s)
2018	7 Din Mohabbat In	Faadi	Farjad Nabi	Cameo appearance	
TBA	Aasmaan Bolay Ga †	Squadron Leader Hasan Siddiqui	Shoaib Mansoor	Unreleased	

=== Television series ===
Year	Title	Role	Network	Notes	Ref(s)
2013	Aasmanon Pay Likha	Shahnawaz	Geo Entertainment	Supporting role	
2014	Dil Nahi Manta	Huzaifa	Ary Digital	Lead role	
2014	Ranjish Hi Sahi	Rohail	Geo Entertainment	Supporting role	
2014	Shikwa	Adeel's doctor	ARY Digital	Supporting role	
2015	Sehra Main Safar	Shahryar	Hum TV	Lead role	
2015	Aik Thi Misaal	Adeel	Hum TV	Lead role	
2016	Saya-e-Dewar Bhi Nahi	Malik Mansoor	Hum TV	Lead role	
2016	Baba Ki Rani	Hamza	ARY Zindagi	Lead role	
2016	Sanam	Shahroz	Hum TV	Supporting role	
2016	Kuch Na Kaho	Mohsin	Hum TV	Lead role	
2017	Woh Aik Pal	Faris	Hum TV	Supporting role	
2017	Titli	Rehan	Urdu 1	Supporting role	
2018	Mah-e-Tamaam	Umair	Hum TV	Lead role	
2018	Tawaan	Shahroz	Hum TV	Lead role	
2018	Maryam Periera	Sufiyan	TVOne	Lead role	
2019	Cheekh	Shayan	ARY Digital	Lead role	
2020	Jalan	Asfandyar	ARY Digital	Lead role	
2021	Ek Jhoota Lafz Mohabbat	Hasan	Express Entertainment	Supporting role	
2023	Jaan-e-Jahan	Taimur	ARY Digital	Supporting role	
2024	Kabhi Main Kabhi Tum	Adeel Ahmed	ARY Digital	Second male lead role	
2025	Kafeel	Jamshed (aka Jami)	ARY Digital	Lead role	

=== Telefilms ===
Year	Title	Role	Channel	Additional notes	Ref(s)
2014	Thoda Pyaar Zyada Love	Zaid	Hum TV		
2015	Tujh Se Naam Hamara	Zaid	Urdu1	Independence day special	
2021	Lockdown	Azfar	Express Entertainment		

=== Web series ===
Year	Title	Role
2022	Mind Games	Jibran

== Awards and nominations ==
Year	Award	Category	Work	Result	Ref(s)
2005	4th Lux Style Awards	Best Model - Male	—N/a	Won	
2006	5th Lux Style Awards	Best Model - Male	—N/a	Nominated	
2007	6th Lux Style Awards	Best Model - Male	—N/a	Nominated	
2025	2nd Kya Drama Hai Icon Awards	Best Performance in a Negative Role (Critics’ Choice)	Kabhi Main Kabhi Tum	Nominated	
2025	2nd Kya Drama Hai Icon Awards	Best Performance in a Negative Role (Popular Choice)	Kabhi Main Kabhi Tum	Nominated	
