= List of programs broadcast by Geo Entertainment =

Programs broadcast by Geo Entertainment

The following is a list of historically significant original programming on Geo Entertainment (2002–present), a television channel in Pakistan that airs Lollywood movies and original TV dramas.

== Current programming ==
=== Original series ===
Date	Show	Ref
19 December 2025	Pehli Barish	
2 February 2026	Sara Aapi	

== Former programming ==
=== Anthology series ===
Name	First aired	Last aired	Ref
Aik Aur Munafiq	27 January 2020	15 April 2020	
Dikhawa	25 April 2020	2 May 2022	
Makafaat	30 September 2019	29 March 2025	
Maamlaat	2 April 2022	1 May 2022	
Nisa	7 April 2022	2 May 2022	

=== Ramadan series ===
Name	First aired	Last aired	Ref
Chaudhry and Sons	3 April 2022	5 May 2022	
Dekho Chaand Aaya	June 2016	2016	
Heer Da Hero	23 March 2023	24 April 2023	
Ishq Jalebi	14 April 2021	16 May 2021	
Ishqaway	12 March 2024	14 April 2024	
Romeo Weds Heer	21 October 2018	26 May 2019	
Shahrukh Ki Saliyaan	8 June 2019	12 January 2020	
SHE	2015	2015	
Tere Aany Se	23 March 2023	25 April 2023	
Tere Mere Sapne	12 March 2024	14 April 2024	
Umm-e-Ayesha	12 March 2024	9 April 2024	
Umm-e-Ayesha 2	2 March 2025	30 March 2025	

=== Sitcom series ===
Name	First aired	Last aired	Ref
Coke Kahani	3 November 2012	31 December 2012	
Dolly Darling	7 May 2019	16 February 2020	
Jalebiyan	2014	2014	
Kis Din Mera Viyah Howay Ga	2 August 2011	18 June 2018	
Ladies Park	22 February 2011	22 February 2011	
Miss Fire	2007	2009	
Nadaaniyaan	1 January 2009	20 December 2011	
Zamani Manzil Kay Maskharay	3 November 2017	2018	

=== Prime time series ===
Name	First aired	Last aired	Ref
Aao Laut Chalein	4 March 2017	30 April 2017	
Aap Ki Kaneez	15 September 2014	23 March 2015	
Aasmanon Pay Likha	18 September 2013	5 March 2014	
Ab Dekh Khuda Kya Karta Hai	7 August 2018	1 January 2019	
Adhoora Bandhan	9 October 2017	3 March 2018	
Adhoori Aurat	16 April 2023	22 October 2013	
Aik Nayee Cinderella	13 October 2012	13 March 2013	
Aik Thi Raniya	3 November 2017	8 June 2018	
Alif	5 October 2019	14 March 2020	
Ana	August 2004	2004	
Ashk	12 June 2012	November 2012	
Aye Musht-E-Khaak	13 December 2021	12 April 2022	
Baba Jani	8 September 2018	28 February 2019	
Badzaat	2 March 2022	4 August 2022	
Bandhay Aik Dor Say	25 June 2020	7 January 2021	
Bashar Momin	14 March 2014	8 November 2014	
Bedardi Saiyaan	25 October 2017	30 January 2018	
Behkawa	9 February 2012	18 July 2012	
Bholi Bano	27 February	11 September 2017	
Bikhra Mera Naseeb	2 May 2014	2 January 2015	
Bojh	11 May 2015	12 August 2015	
Bol Meri Machli	27 November 2009	23 April 2010	
Case No. 9	24 September 2025	8 January 2026	
Chemistry	8 October 2010	8 October 2010	
Chauraha	31 May 2022	3 October 2022	
Dayan	24 February 2025	9 September 2025	
Darr Khuda Say	18 June 2019	24 March 2020	
Deewangi	18 December 2019	26 August 2020	
Dhaani	12 July 2016	14 February 2017	
Dil-e-Gumshuda	30 September 2019	14 November 2019	
Dil-e-Momin	12 November 2021	30 April 2022	
Dil-e-Nadan	2009	2009	
Dil-e-Nadan	13 August 2024	18 February 2025	
Dil Ishq	22 July 2015	8 December 2015	
Dil Kiya Karay	14 January 2019	8 July 2019	
Dil Muhallay Ki Haveli	2013	2014	
Dilfareb	22 May 2015	9 August 2015	
Do Qadam Door Thay	3 February 2014	7 April 2014	
Doraha	17 October 2008	23 January 2009	
Ek Hatheli Pe Hina Ek Hatheli Pe Lahoo	13 May 2011	2011	
Ehraam-e-Junoon	8 May 2023	25 September 2023	
Farq	31 October 2022	18 April 2023	
Fitoor	14 January 2021	22 September 2021	
Ghaao	2013	2013	
Ghar Titli Ka Par	28 December 2017	4 October 2018	
Haasil	28 August 2016	5 April 2017	
Hadsa	21 August 2023	5 October 2023	
Hari Hari Churiyaan	1 August 2017	7 February 2018	
Hazaron Saal	27 February 2012	6 June 2012	
Heer	25 January 2016	2016	
Hiddat	12 April 2017	31 August 2017	
Hina Ki Khushboo	29 November 2017	14 April 2018	
Hum Tum	26 October 2010	1 February 2011	
Iqraar	21 October 2014	24 March 2015	
Ishq Ibadat	22 October 2011	10 March 2012	
Ishq Ki Inteha	2009	2010	
Ishqaaway	27 July 2015	17 November 2015	
Iss Khamoshi Ka Matlab	13 April 2016	21 September 2016	
Izn-e-Rukhsat	11 July 2016	23 January 2017	
Jaan Nisar	11 May 2024	26 October 2024	
Jahez	9 February 2012	14 July 2012	
Jal Pari	13 October 2011	2 February 2012	
Jannat Se Aagay	11 August 2023	18 November 2023	
Jo Bichar Gaye	12 December 2021	13 March 2022	
Jo Chale To Jaan Se Guzar Gaye	19 September 2011	2012	
Joru Ka Ghulam	13 July 2016	21 October 2016	
Kaanch Ki Guriya	30 March 2015	9 November 2015	
Kahan Tum Chalay Gye	30 April 2016	18 September 2016	
Kahin Deep Jaley	3 October 2019	14 May 2020	
Kaif-e-Baharan	25 February 2018	1 September 2018	
Kalmoohi	21 November 2013	29 January 2014	
Kam Zarf	8 January 2019	11 June 2019	
Kasa-e-Dil	9 November 2020	19 July 2021	
Khaali Haath	6 February 2017	14 August 2017	
Khaani	6 November 2017	2 July 2018	
Khaie	3 January 2024	27 March 2024	
Khalish	14 February 2018	19 August 2018	
Khan	19 February 2017	20 October 2017	
Khuda Aur Muhabbat	17 February 2011	5 November 2021	
Kuch Dil Ne Kaha	2006	2006	
Ladoon Mein Pali	2014	2014	
Laut Ke Chalay Aana	5 July 2017	20 December 2017	
Mahnoor	2004	2004	
Makan	2006	2006	
Malika-e-Aliya	8 April 2014	5 May 2015	
Malkin	25 September 2017	18 February 2018	
Manchahi	22 December 2016	21 July 2017	
Mannchali	25 April 2016	12 September 2016	
Mann Ke Moti	2014	2014	
Mann Mast Malang	21 February 2025	29 June 2025	
Mannat Murad	26 September 2023	16 January 2024	
Marzi	14 July 2016	15 December 2016	
Meharposh	3 April 2020	8 January 2021	
Mehshar	6 December 2024	30 April 2025	
Mera Khuda Jane	2 May 2018	28 November 2018	
Mera Rab Waris	7 March 2019	26 September 2019	
Meray Humnasheen	6 May 2022	1 October 2022	
Mere Mohsin	19 June 2019	11 December 2019	
Meri Behan Maya	17 September 2011	11 January 2012	
Meri Dulari	13 March 2013	2013	
Meri Zaat Zarra-e-Benishan	28 November 2009	22 May 2010	
Meri Zindagi Hai Tu	2013	2014	
Mi Raqsam	2012	2013	
Mirat-ul-Uroos	4 December 2012	6 June 2013	
Mohabbat Na Kariyo	11 October 2019	20 March 2020	
Mohabbat Tumse Nafrat Hai	8 April 2017	29 October 2017	
Mor Mahal	24 April 2016	18 March 2017	
Mora Piya	2 December 2011	3 March 2012	
Mujhay Qabool Nahin	12 July 2023	20 December 2023	
Mujhe Kuch Kehna Hai	4 October 2015	11 February 2016	
Muqaddar	17 February 2020	2 November 2020	
Nanhi	11 March 2013	1 July 2013	
Noor-e-Zindagi	15 July 2016	27 January 2017	
Noor Bibi	2019	2019	
Numm	24 August 2013	28 September 2013	
Qaid	6 December 2018	8 May 2019	
Qalandar	14 October 2022	23 April 2023	
Qayamat	5 January 2021	16 June 2021	
Raaz-e-Ulfat	7 April 2020	20 December 2020	
Ramz-e-Ishq	2 August 2019	10 February 2020	
Rasam	1 May 2014	11 December 2014	
Ru Baru Ishq Tha	22 June 2018	23 November 2018	
Rukhsaar	9 December 2013	19 May 2014	
Rukhsati	12 March 2014	19 November 2014	
Saari Bhool Hamari Thi	21 August 2013	20 November 2013	
Saas Bahu	20 August 2015	7 January 2016	
Saat Pardon Mein	1 January 2012	17 December 2012	
Sabz Pari Laal Kabootar	11 June 2012	23 December 2012	
Saltanat-e-Dil	18 December 2014	5 June 2015	
Satrangi	2008	2008	
Shaam Dhaley	24 April 2016	3 September 2016	
Shayad	4 November 2017	24 March 2018	
Shiddat	12 February 2024	12 August 2024	
Silsilay	2 January 2018	31 July 2018	
Sunn Mere Dil	9 October 2024	19 February 2025	
Tere Bin	28 December 2022	6 July 2023	
Tere Bina	21 February 2017	6 October 2017	
Teri Berukhi	19 April 2013	13 September 2013	
Teri Meri Jodi	22 December 2015	16 June 2016	
Thoda Sa Aasman	16 July 2016	13 November 2016	
Thori Si Wafa Chahiye	18 March 2010	15 July 2010	
Tishnagi Dil Ki	8 March 2017	15 July 2017	
Tohmat	9 March 2018	19 August 2018	
Tum Ho Ke Chup	30 April 2011	2011	
Tum Se Hi Talluq Hai	16 July 2018	7 January 2019	
Uff Yeh Mohabbat	19 February 2014	19 October 2014	
Umm-e-Haniya	2018	2019	
Umrao Jaan Ada	2003	2003	
Uraan	6 November 2010	12 March 2011	
Wafa	12 April 2016	10 August 2016	
Yaar-E-Bewafa	6 July 2017	21 December 2017	
Yaariyan	19 April 2019	4 October 2019	
Yariyan	14 June 2010	6 December 2010	
Yeh Chahatein Yeh Shiddatein	16 July 2016	18 October 2016	
Zeenat Bint-e-Sakina Hazir Ho	16 March 2010	15 June 2010	
Zip Bus Chup Raho	24 January 2011	29 June 2011	

=== Daily series ===
Name	First aired	Last aired	Ref
Aafat	18 October 2024	26 December 2024	
Aik Lafz Zindagi	5 May 2025	3 August 2025	
Babul Ka Angna	13 January 2016	16 May 2016	
Banno	29 September 2021	2 January 2022	
Baraat Series	2009	2012	
Baray Bhaiya	14 June 2025	12 September 2025	
Bari Bahu	13 January 2015	13 May 2015	
Be Rehem	17 July 2018	19 December 2018	
Bechari Mehrunnisa	29 November 2016	15 July 2017	
Bechari Qudsia	19 July 2021	28 September 2021	
Behkaway	16 April 2025	13 June 2025	
Bharosa Pyar Tera	10 June 2019	20 September 2019	
Bojh	1 May 2023	19 July 2023	
Chaal	1 June 2024	28 July 2024	
Champa Aur Chambeli	21 April 2017	26 August 2017	
Choti	17 October 2014	12 June 2015	
Dao	4 March 2024	31 May 2024	
Daraar	10 August 2022	22 December 2022	
Dil Awaiz	6 May 2022	10 June 2022	
Dil Zaar Zaar	10 March 2022	30 May 2022	
Dour	29 June 2021	23 November 2021	
Grift	1 January 2023	26 April 2023	
Fasiq	23 November 2021	9 March 2022	
Fitrat	2 November 2020	30 January 2021	
Ghaata	15 January 2024	31 March 2024	
Ghar Aik Jannat	2014	2014	
Ghutan	2017	2018	
Girhein	23 September 2024	19 December 2024	
Guddu	18 August 2022	30 October 2022	
Habil aur Qabil	7 June 2024	26 July 2024	
Haya	13 September 2025	20 November 2025	
Haq Mehar	29 July 2024	8 October 2024	
Iblees	11 January 2026	20 March 2026	
Ishq Mein Tere Sadqay	13 February 2026	23 March 2026	
Kaffara	27 July 2024	17 October 2024	
Kalank	29 August 2023	12 October 2023	
Kaash Main Teri Beti Na Hoti	2011	2012	
Kathputli	5 April 2025	27 November 2025	
Khoob Seerat	17 February 2020	22 May 2020	
Kinara	2008	2009	
Khush Naseebi	24 March 2026	2026	
Maa Nahi Saas Hoon Main	3 November 2023	3 March 2024	
Mafaad Parast	24 November 2025	12 February 2026	
Maikay Ki Yaad Na Aaye	6 July 2016	29 November 2016	
Maikey Ko Dedo Sandes	17 August 2015	27 December 2015	
Main Agar Chup Hoon	23 November 2020	21 February 2021	
Mann Marzi	10 January 2025	15 April 2025	
Mehroom	15 April 2024	6 June 2024	
Mera Dard Bayzuban	15 August 2016	27 October 2016	
Mera Haq	25 December 2017	17 July 2018	
Mera Yahan Koi Nahi	15 August 2015	5 December 2015	
Meri Maa	22 August 2013	17 March 2015	
Meri Saheli Meri Bhabi	6 July 2016	24 May 2017	
Mere Khuwabon Ka Diya	2013	2014	
Mohabbat Chor Di Maine	7 October 2021	22 November 2021	
Mohlat	17 May 2021	19 July 2021	
Mubarak Ho Rishta Aaya Hai	21 April 2017	23 September 2017	
Mujhe Khuda Pay Yaqeen Hai	1 February 2021	8 May 2021	
Munafiq	27 January 2020	15 April 2020	
Mushkil	23 July 2022	4 September 2022	
Nikah	20 January 2023	30 April 2023	
Noor Jahan	2016	2016	
Pathar Dil	4 August 2025	12 November 2025	
Paras	13 August 2015	19 October 2015	
Partition Aik Safar	2007	2007	
Piya Naam Ka Diya	23 July 2019	27 September 2019	
Pyari Nimmo	7 September 2023	2 November 2023	
Rang De	24 March 2026	2026	
Rang Mahal	24 July 2021	6 October 2021	
Sandal	2009	2011	
Sangdil	29 February 2016	23 September 2016	
Sawera	10 May 2017	2017	
Seerat	18 November 2018	29 April 2019	
Sirf Tum	19 July 2023	28 August 2023	
Siyani	5 September 2022	31 December 2022	
Tanveer Fatima (B.A)	2009	2009	
Tauba	18 October 2024	9 January 2025	
Tere Pehlu Mein	2006	2006	
Tootay Huway Per	11 April 2011	22 December 2011	
Umeed	31 August 2020	13 November 2020	
Uraan	31 August 2020	30 October 2020	
Yeh Zindagi Hai	12 May 2008	2013	
Zakham	11 June 2022	22 July 2022	
Zindagi Aik Paheli	31 October 2022	18 January 2023	

=== Horror and Supernatural series ===
Name	First aired	Last aired
Saaya (season 1)	21 March 2018	21 November 2018
Saaya (season 2)	6 May 2022	18 June 2022
Jinzada	20 July 2023	20 August 2023
Guddi	20 December 2024	17 April 2025

=== Miniseries ===
Name	First aired	Last aired	Ref
Contractors	10 April 2024	14 April 2024	
Doosra Chehra	7 June 2025	10 June 2025	
Hashtag	31 March 2025	3 April 2025	
Ishq Hua	11 August 2024	29 September 2024	
Jhoom	12 May 2023	14 July 2023	
Jurm	28 April 2023	6 May 2023	
Kaarzar-e-Dua	28 July 2025	15 August 2025	
Yahya	1 November 2024	23 November 2024	

=== Telefilms ===
Name	Release date
Aap Kay Ajanay Say	2023
Abhi Tou Main Jawan Houn	2020
Aina	2013
Andleeb Ka Aashiq	2024
Anjuman	2013
Armaan	2013
Baal Baal Bach Gaye	2020
Bhaag Amina Bhaag	2019
Bitiya Hamaray Zamanay Mein	2016
Budhi Ghori Laal Lagam	2023
Chhapar Phaar kay	2020
Daadi Ka Daamad	2021
Dino Ki Dulhaniya	2018
Dil Mera Dharkan Teri	2013
Dil Phisla Rey	2022
Dil Tera Hogaya	2020
Dulha Bana Bakra	2022
Eid In Laws	2023
Fakhroo Ki Dulhaniya	2023
Jodi Ban Gayi	2024
Laal	2019
Love Life Ka Law	2022
Love Siyappa	2020
Lo Pakray Gaye	2020
Mast Mohabbat	2022
Meri Uraan	2025
Mehndi Laga Ke Rakhna	2020
Meray Dost Meray Yaar	2019
Nazar Kay Samnay	2020
Pyaar Tou Warh Gaya	2024
Qissa Aik Gaye Ka	2020
Rok Sako To Rok Lo	2020
Romantic Razia	2021
Ruposh	2022
Suno Roshni Kya Kehti Hai	2025
Teray Pyar Mai	2020
Teri Meri Kahani	2021
Teri Meri Love Story	2015
Tujhse He Raabta	2015
Yeh Tou 2 Much Hogaya	2023
Zoya Nay Haan Kardi	2021

=== Animated series ===
Name	First aired	Last aired
Team Muhafiz	25 June 2022	17 September 2022

=== Reality shows ===
Reality shows
Name	First aired	Last aired
4 Man Show	2005	2009
Hum Sub Umeed Se Hain	14 July 2007	26 December 2015
Banana News Network	10 April 2011	29 July 2015
Foodistan	23 January 2012	21 March 2013
Sur Kshetra	8 September 2012	29 December 2012
Pakistan Idol	6 December 2013	27 April 2014
Inaam Ghar Plus	18 January 2014	2017
Asia's Singing Superstar	31 October 2015	30 January 2016
The Price Is Right	2019	2019
Pakistan Idol season 2	4 October 2025	14 February 2026
Pakistan's Got Talent	4 July 2026	present

=== Talk shows ===
Name	First aired	Last aired
Nadia Khan Show	13 November 2006	24 May 2013
The Sahir Show	2005	2009
The Shareef Show Mubarak Ho	26 October 2009	2010
Subh e Pakistan	19 November 2014	8 July 2016
Utho Jago Pakistan	29 November 2010	27 February 2013

=== Award shows ===
Name	Ref
Lux Style Awards	
Stardust Awards	

=== Ramazan special transmissions ===
Name	First aired	Last aired
Amaan Ramazan	11 July 2013	8 August 2013

=== Dubbed series and Reality shows ===
Name	First aired	Last aired	Notes
Alif Laila	25 December 2011	2012	Canadian animated series
Bade Achhe Lagte Hain	30 May 2011	10 July 2014	Indian series
Bewafai	14 September 2010	18 June 2013	Turkish series
Haji Bayram Veli	28 July 2025	28 September 2025	Turkish series
Handy Manny	16 September 2006	14 February 2013	American series
Kurulus Osman 5	4 October 2023	12 June 2024	Turkish series
Kurulus Osman 6	29 October 2024	1 July 2025	Turkish series
Maria-Mummy Papa Ki Jaan	19 June 2000	16 March 2001	Mexican children series
Mavera	12 August 2024	28 October 2024	Turkish series
Mickey Mouse Clubhouse	5 May 2006	6 November 2016	American animated series
Na Tootay Rishta	1 June 2009	25 October 2016	Indian series
Noor	20 January 2005	16 June 2007	Turkish series
Phineas and Ferb	17 August 2007	12 June 2015	American animated series
Qubool Hai	29 October 2012	23 January 2016	Indian series
Sapne Suhane Ladakpan Ke	21 May 2012	23 January 2015	Indian series
Tedi Sim Sim	2004	2008	American animated sitcom
X Factor India	29 May 2011	2 September 2011	Indian reality show

== See also ==
- List of programs broadcast by ARY Digital
- List of programs broadcast by Hum TV
- List of television channels in Pakistan
- List of Pakistani television series
