= Maha Hasan (actress) =

Pakistani actress

- Born: 25 October 1995 (age 30); Karachi, Pakistan
- Education: National University of Sciences and Technology; National Academy of Performing Arts
- Occupation: Actress
- Years active: 2017-present

Maha Hasan is a Pakistani television actress. Her notable television appearances are in Ishqiya (2020), Nand (2020), Safar Tamam Howa (2021), and Yunhi (2023).

== Early life and education ==
Hasan was born and raised in Karachi, Pakistan. She graduated from National Academy of Performing Arts, Karachi.

== Career ==
She made her on-screen debut in 2017 on ARY Digital's drama Khuda Mera Bhi Hai with a small supporting role Rana. Then she appeared with Big Bang Entertainment's Ishqiya, and later appeared in Nand in a supporting role. In 2021, she appeared in Momina Duraid's Safar Tamam Howa alongside Madiha Imam and Ali Rehman Khan. She portrayed the role of a young one who is mentally challenged, and was praised for her performance.

== Filmography ==
=== Television series ===
Year	Title	Role	Notes	Ref(s)
2017	Khuda Mera Bhi Hai	Rana	ARY Digital	
2020	Ishqiya	Zoya Khalid	ARY Digital	
2020	Nand	Farwa	ARY Digital	
2021	Safar Tamam Howa	Rija	Hum TV	
2022	Ilzaam	Zara	Aan TV	
2023	Yunhi	Suriya	Hum TV	
2023	Chand Tara	Roomi	Hum TV	
2023	Jurm	Ashley Victor	Geo Entertainment	
2023	Tumhare Husn Ke Naam	Sarah	Green Entertainment	
2024	Chand Nagar	Tani	BOL Entertainment	
2024	Sultanat	Maham	Hum TV	
2024	BOL Kahani	Erum	BOL Network	
2024	Faraar	Shumaila	Green Entertainment	
2025	Mann Mast Malang	Minha	Geo Entertainment	
2025	Kuch Na Kehna	Shumail	Green Entertainment	
2025	Mohalla	Noor	Express Entertainment	

=== Telefilm ===
Year	Title	Role
2025	Meri Uraan	Qudsia

=== Web series ===
Year	Title	Role	Notes	OTT Platform
2020	Superheroes	Natasha	Teeli	YouTube
2020	Churails	Rida	Directed by Asim Abbasi	Zee5
2026	Farar	Natasha	Directed by Mehreen Jabbar	Zee5
TBA	Maya		Directed by Kanwal Khoosat	Project of Embassy of The Netherlands

== Theatre ==
Play	Performed at	Directed By
Antigone	National Academy of Performing Arts	Khalid Ahmad
Aadhe Adhoore (The Incomplete Ones)	National Academy of Performing Arts	Khalid Ahmad
Anji	National Academy of Performing Arts	Zain Ahmed
A Doll's House	National Academy of Performing Arts	Sunil Shankar
A Midsummer Night’s Dream	National Academy of Performing Arts	Sunil Shankar
Betrayal	National Academy of Performing Arts	Sunil Shankar
No Exit	National Academy of Performing Arts	Sunil Shankar

== Writing ==
Title	Form	Notes
When Birds Fly Away	Short Play	Winner at Worldwide Teach-In on Climate & Justice’s juried competition by Bard College
Aab Beeti	Short Audio Stories	British Council (WOW Festival)

== Awards and nominations ==
Year	Award	Category	Result	Title	Ref.
2021	ARY People's Choice Awards	Favorite Actor in a role of Behen	Nominated	Ishqiya	
2021	ARY People's Choice Awards	Favorite Emerging Talent (Female)	Nominated	Nand	
