= Annie Zaidi (actress) =

Pakistani actress

- Born: 12 October 1963 (age 62); Karachi, Pakistan
- Education: University of Karachi
- Occupation: Actress
- Years active: 1984 – present
- Children: Ali Zaidi (son); Maheen Zaidi (daughter)

Annie Zaidi is a Pakistani film and TV actress. She is known for her roles in dramas Dulhan, Bin Roye, Alif Allah Aur Insaan and Fitoor.

== Early life ==
She was born on 12 September 1963 in Karachi, Pakistan and completed her studies from University of Karachi.

== Career ==
She made her debut as an actress on PTV in 1984. She appeared in drama Chhaon. She was noted for her roles in the dramas Mohabat Subh Ka Sitara Hai, Aahista Aahista, Mausam, Zoya Sawleha, Manchahi, Bin Roye, and Dil Banjaara. She also appeared in dramas Gustakh Ishq, Alif Allah Aur Insaan, Amanat, Tabeer and Ki Jaana Main Kaun, and Yaqeen Ka Safar. Since then she appeared in dramas Uraan, Tawaan, Muqaddar, Dunk and Fitoor. In 2020, she appeared in the film House No. 242 with Sonya Hussyn and Hira Tareen.

== Personal life ==
Annie was married and in 2005 her husband died. She has three children a son named Ali Zaidi and a daughter named Maheen Zaidi.

== Filmography ==
=== Television ===
Year	Title	Role	Network
1984	Chhaon	Bela	PTV
1996	Teesra Aadmi	Lawyer	PTV
1999	Tawan	Samina	PTV
2013	Mohabat Subh Ka Sitara Hai	Fakhra	Hum TV
2014	Aahista Aahista	Safia	Hum TV
2014	Mausam	Lubna	Hum TV
2016	Bin Roye	Talat	Hum TV
2016	Manchahi	Nadia	Geo TV
2016	Dil Banjaara	Mehtab	Hum TV
2017	Zoya Sawleha	Malaika	Geo Entertainment
2017	Gustakh Ishq	Khalida	Urdu 1
2017	Yaqeen Ka Safar	Gaeti's mother	Hum TV
2017	Amanat	Sharosh's mother	Urdu 1
2017	Alif Allah Aur Insaan	Malkani	Hum TV
2018	Tabeer	Asma	Hum TV
2018	Tawaan	Rayana	Hum TV
2018	Ki Jaana Main Kaun	Rabya Ansari	Hum TV
2018	Aik Larki Aam Si	Farhan's mother	Hum TV
2020	Makafaat Season 2	Sufian's mother	Geo Entertainment
2020	Dikhawa	Bismah's mother	Geo Entertainment
2020	Uraan	Sumaira	Geo Entertainment
2020	Muqaddar	Maimuna	Geo Entertainment
2020	Dulhan	Khadija	Hum TV
2020	Dunk	Ms. VC	ARY Digital
2021	Dikhawa Season 2	Sohai's mother	Geo Entertainment
2021	Fitoor	Kulsoom	Geo Entertainment
2021	Safar Tamam Howa	Rafia	Hum TV
2021	Hum Kahan Ke Sachay Thay	Saffan's mother	Hum TV
2021	Dil-e-Momin	Ansa	Geo Entertainment
2022	Yeh Na Thi Hamari Qismat	Asiya	ARY Digital
2022	Fraud	Jahanara	ARY Digital
2022	Taqdeer	Khadija	ARY Digital
2023	Kuch Ankahi	Almas	ARY Digital
2024	Teri Chhaon Mein	Nasreen	Hum TV
2024	Kabhi Main Kabhi Tum	Salma	ARY Digital
2024	Kaffara	Mehreen	Geo Entertainment
2025	Hijr	Sitwat	Hum TV
2025	Agar Tum Sath Ho	Noshaba	Hum TV
2025	Behroopia	Rahila	Green Entertainment
2025	Humraaz	Saiqa	Geo TV
2025	Pamaal	TBA	Green Entertainment

=== Web series ===
Year	Title	Role	Network
2021	Dhoop Ki Deewar	Lubna Ansar	ZEE5

=== Telefilm ===
Year	Title	Role
2018	Jeena Hai Mushkil	Saim's mother
2024	Achari Mohabbat	Aliya

=== Film ===
Year	Title	Role
2015	Bin Roye	Saman's foster mother
2018	Parwaaz Hai Junoon	Sania's aunt
2020	House No. 242	Meerab's mother
2025	Love Guru	
