= Parveen Akbar =

Pakistani actress

- پروین اکبر
- Born: 7 April 1959 (age 67); Karachi, Pakistan
- Occupations: Actress, Producer
- Years active: 1970 – present
- Children: Muhammad Faizan Sheikh (son); Rabya Kulsoom (daughter)
- Relatives: Maham Amir (daughter-in-law); Rehan Nizami (son-in-law)

Parveen Akbar is a Pakistani actress. She is known for her roles in dramas Zamani Manzil Kay Maskharay, Ab Dekh Khuda Kya Karta Hai, Yeh Zindagi Hai and Deewangi.

== Career ==
She started her acting career in 1970 and appeared in dramas on PTV. She is known for her roles in Zamani Manzil Kay Maskharay, Ab Dekh Khuda Kya Karta Hai, Yeh Zindagi Hai and Deewangi.

== Personal life ==
Parveen is married and has three children. Parveen's daughter Rabya Kulsoom and son Muhammad Faizan Sheikh are both actors. Actress Maham Amir is her daughter-in-law and lead vocalist of the pop rock band Mirage, Rehan Nizami, is her son-in-law.

== Filmography ==
=== Television ===
Year	Title	Role	Network
2004	Naseeb	Mrs. Usmani	PTV
2004	Moorat	Hameeda	ARY Digital
2005	Riyasat	Ayesha's mother	ARY Digital
2006	Makan	Saima's mum	Geo TV
2007	Husna Aur Husan Ara	Khala	TV One
2007	Sarkar Sahab	Rani Bi	ARY Digital
2008	Chaar Chand	Ghazala	Geo TV
2008	Yeh Zindagi Hai	Bano	Geo Entertainment
2008	Doraha	Shahla's mother	Geo Entertainment
2009	Aashti	Aashti's mother	Hum TV
2011	Extras: The Mango People	Amma Ji	Hum TV
2011	Kitni Girhain Baaki Hain	Huma	Hum TV
2012	Dil Nawab Ki Sultana	Shakeela	Express Entertainment
2013	Yeh Zindagi Hai season 2	Bano	Geo Entertainment
2014	Digest Writer	Sajida	Hum TV
2014	Zulekha Bina Yusuf	Sabra	A-Plus
2014	Kissey Apna Kahein	Jabi's mother	Hum TV
2014	Shareek-e-Hayat	Shabnam	Hum TV
2015	Akeli	Sidra's mother	Hum TV
2015	Khuda Dekh Raha Hai	Sanam's mother	A-Plus
2016	Main Kamli	Meer's mother	Aaj Entertainment
2016	Kahan Tum Chalay Gye	Kausar	Geo TV
2016	Meri Saheli Meri Bhabi	Shabana	Geo TV
2016	Thora Sa Aasman	Jagat Khala	Geo TV
2017	Kiran	Kiran's mami	Geo Entertainment
2017	Tere Bina	Pakeezah's mother	Geo Entertainment
2017	Meri Saheli Meri Bhabi Season 2	Shabana	Geo TV
2017	Kitni Girhain Baaki Hain Season 2	Atif's mother	Hum TV
2017	Ready Steady Go	Khairan	Play Entertainment
2017	Zamani Manzil Kay Maskharay	Zaman Begum	Geo Entertainment
2018	Ab Dekh Khuda Kya Karta Hai	Shaista	Geo Entertainment
2018	Kabhi Band Kabhi Baja	Saima	Express Entertainment
2018	Mah-e-Tamaam	Tai Jan	Hum TV
2018	Naik Parveen	Shakra	Geo Entertainment
2019	Deewangi	Nuzhat's mother-in-law	Geo Entertainment
2020	Makafaat Season 2	Saqab's mother	Geo Entertainment
2020	Khoob Seerat	Saba	Geo Entertainment
2020	Ghamandi	Dadi	Express Entertainment
2021	Iman Aur Yaqeen	Salman's mother	Aaj Entertainment
2021	Ishq Jalebi	Bazgah Phuppo	Geo Entertainment
2021	Dikhawa Season 2	Sabiha	Geo Entertainment
2022	Makafaat Season 4	Akila	Geo Entertainment
2022	Dikhawa Season 3	Fareeda	Geo Entertainment
2022	Nisa	Nabeel's mother	Geo TV
2022	Sirat-e-Mustaqeem Season 2	Sameera	ARY Digital
2022	Hoor Pari Noor	Kashi's grandmother	Express Entertainment
2022	Siyani	Fazeelat	Geo TV
2023	Meray Hi Rehna	Rukhsana	ARY Digital
2023	Jinzada	Atiya	Geo Entertainment
2023	Qabeel	Akbar's mother	Aur Life
2023	Mein Kahani Hun	Naheed's mother	Express Entertainment
2023	Bulbulay	Haseena Begum	ARY Digital
2023	Mannat Murad	Shamim	Geo Entertainment
2024	Suhana	Sultan's mother	Aur Life
2024	Raaz	Shabana	Green Entertainment
2024	Rishtey	Asim's mother	Aan TV
2024	Maya Naaz	Atiya's mother	PTV
2024	Hasrat	Shaheen	ARY Digital
2024	Bhootiya Villa	Dadi	Set Entertainment
2024	Bewafai	Mehnaz	A-Plus
2024	BOL Kahani	Nasreen	BOL Network
2024	Akeli	Samina	Aur Life
2024	Bajjo	Qudsia	Geo TV
2024	Mohabbat Aur Mehangai	Zubaida	Green Entertainment
2025	Dastak	Seema	ARY Digital
2025	Pehli Mohabbat	Razia	Hum TV
2025	Bahar Nagar	Manto	Geo Entertainment
2026	Nikammay	Khalida	Express Entertainment

=== Web series ===
Year	Title	Role	Network
2017	Rishta For Sale	Madame	Teeli
2023	Razia	Hajra	Express Entertainment

=== Telefilm ===
Year	Title	Role
2019	Pinky Ka Dulha	Pinky's mother

=== Film ===
Year	Title	Role
2010	Sulah	Namreen's mother
2011	Utavli	Noreen's mother
2013	Josh: Independence Through Unity	Parveen
2016	Jhoot Wala Love	Amna Ahmed
2017	Azaad	Mehru
2022	Ishrat Made in China	Ishrat's Mom
2024	Aur Phir	Khala
