= Dania Enwer =

Pakistani television actress (born 1992)

- Born: 9 February 1992 (age 34); Karachi, Sindh, Pakistan
- Occupations: Actress; Model; Costume designer
- Years active: 2016-present
- Spouse: Farhan Nadeem Baig
- Children: 2
- Relatives: Nadeem (father-in-law)

Dania Enwer is a Pakistani actress who works in Urdu television. She rose to prominence after playing a supporting role in ARY Digital's Habs. Besides acting, she has also worked as a costume designer. Her most recent television presence has been in Tamasha (season 3) on ARY Digital and Aik Lafz Zindagi currently airing on Geo Entertainment.

== Career ==
Enwer made her acting debut in Geo Entertainment's Heer. She first played the leading role in Fasih Bari Khan's written Faltu Larki alongside an ensemble cast of Hina Dilpazir, Samiya Mumtaz and Salman Shahid. After a setback due to stereotypical projects and portrayals, she then starred in series such as Adhuri Kahani, Badnaseeb and Sila-e-Mohabbat. In 2022, she played a supporting role in Six Sigma Plus' Habs alongside Ushna Shah, Feroze Khan and Saba Faisal, which earned her better recognition.

== Personal life ==
Enwer was married at a young age. According to her, the marriage was physically and emotionally abusive and ended in divorce. Later she married Farhan Nadeem Baig, son of actor Nadeem.

== Filmography ==
=== Television series ===
Year	Title	Role	Notes
2016	Heer	Mehmaa	
2016	Kahan Tum Chalay Gye	Salma	
2016	Dhaani	Shaani	
2016	Faltu Larki	Jahan Ara	
2017	Wafa Ka Mausam	Neeli	
2017	Zindagu Aur Kitny Zakham	Hoorain	
2017	Rasm E Duniya	Shiza	
2017	Zamani Manzil Kay Maskharay	Chandni	
2018	Khalish	Rimsha	
2018	Karam Jali	Chanda	
2018	Bechari Nadia	Nadia	
2018	Adhuri Kahani	Sana	
2020	Mera Maan Rakhna	Sonia	
2020	Tamanna	Dania	
2021	Sila-e-Mohabbat	Shreena	
2021	Oye Motti	Mehwish	
2021	Badnaseeb	Mahrukh	
2022	Makafaat Season 4	Farah	Episodic Appearance
2022	Khatta Meetha	Madam	
2022	Meray Humnasheen	Anna	
2022	Mamlaat	Annie	Episodic Appearance
2022	Habs	Bano Sadiq	
2023	Ehsaan Faramosh	Aliya	
2023	Tere Ishq Ke Naam	Tasmeen	
2023	Jannat Se Aagay	Naseem	
2023	Adawat	Babi	
2024	Radd	Zoya	
2024	Jaan Nisar	Fiza	
2024	Akhri Baar	Faryal	
2024	Tamasha 3	Herself	Reality Show
2025	Aik Lafz Zindagi	Aimen	
2025	Aik Bhool	Batool	

=== Film ===
Year	Title	Role	Notes
2021	Dhoka	Anum	Short film; released on YouTube
2022	Behen Bhai	Ayesha	
