= Safar Tamam Howa =

Pakistani drama based on the novel

- Title card
- Genre: Romance; Family drama
- Based on: Safar Tamam Hua by Rahat Jabeen
- Written by: Rahat Jabeen
- Directed by: Shehrazade Sheikh
- Starring: Madiha Imam; Ali Rehman Khan; Syed Jibran; Maha Hasan
- Country of origin: Pakistan
- Original language: Urdu
- No. of episodes: 21

Production
- Producer: Momina Duraid
- Camera setup: Multi-camera setup
- Running time: approx. 40 minutes

Original release
- Network: Hum TV
- Release: 16 March – 7 September 2021

Safar Tamam Howa (Urdu: سفر تمام ہوا, lit. 'The Journey is Over') is a Pakistani drama serial based on the novel of the same name by Rahat Jabeen. It was telecast on Hum TV from 16 March 2021 to 7 June 2021. It features Madiha Imam, Ali Rehman Khan, Syed Jibran, Samina Ahmad, and Maha Hasan in lead roles. The story revolves around a household where everything changes after an accident.

== Summary ==
Qudsia is the head of the house where she lives with her two sons Sami and Jamal, her niece named Rija, brother-in-law Anwar and Anwar's daughter Anoushey. While Sami loves Anoushey since childhood, she agrees to marry Jamal under a previously stipulated arrangement by Qudsia's husband. However, one day Rija is suddenly found dead under mysterious circumstances. After her sad demise being shrouded in mystery, the lives of the people in the house completely change under the burden of hatred, jealousy and unwarranted assumptions.

== Cast ==
- Madiha Imam as Anoushey “Annu”; the hopeful female protagonist and Sami's eventual wife
- Ali Rehman Khan as Sami; male protagonist and Anoushey's eventual husband
- Syed Jibran as Jamal; Sami's elder brother who wants to marry Anoushey
- Maha Hasan as Rija; Sami and Anoushey's mentally challenged cousin
- Samina Ahmed as Qudsia; Sami and Jamal's loving and caring mother who also raises Rija and Anoushey's
- Annie Zaidi as Rafia; Qudsia's sister and Nabeel's mother, runs a boutique
- Haris Waheed as Nabeel; Rafia's son and flirty by nature, shares strong bond with Rija and falls for Ayeza
- Sonia Nazir as Ayeza; Anoushey's bold and confident friend and Nabeel's love interest
- Saife Hassan as Anwar; Anoushey's lazy father who once used to be a Tabla Nawaz (a musician)
- Ayesha Gul as Nazli Begum; former stage actress and Anwar's second wife
- Noreen Gulwani as Nazo; Nazli Begum's daughter, slightly immature and wants to marry someone
- Hamza Sheikh as Nasir; neighbor of Qudsia
- Umer Aalam as Jamal's friend
- Salma Asim as Nazil Begum's friend

== Production ==
The serial marked comeback of Ali Rehman Khan after his last serial Khaas in 2019. The drama serial is directed by Shehrazade Sheikh who previously directed Muqaddar which also stars Madiha Imam.

=== Broadcast ===
The serial was started to broadcast on 16 March 2021. The series was given the timeslot of Mohabbatein Chahatein, 8:00pm on Tuesday nights, which was shifted to Thursday nights at 8:00pm. However, after the end of Dulhan, it started airing on Monday and Tuesday nights at 8:00 PM.
