= Mohabbat Mukhtasir =

2026 Pakistani television series

- Genre: Romantic drama
- Written by: Nooran Makhdoom
- Directed by: Meer Sikandar
- Starring: Usama Khan; Madiha Imam; Alyy Khan; Atiqa Odho
- Country of origin: Pakistan
- Original language: Urdu

Production
- Producer: Momina Duraid
- Production company: Momina Duraid Productions

Original release
- Network: Hum TV
- Release: 27 September 2026

Mohabbat Mukhtasir is a 2026 Pakistani romantic drama television series broadcast on Hum TV. Directed by Meer Sikandar and produced by Momina Duraid Productions, it stars Usama Khan and Madiha Imam in lead roles, alongside Alyy Khan, Atiqa Odho, Zainab Mazhar and Bakhtawar Mazhar. The series premiered on 27 September 2026.

The story follows Maaz and Mirha, two individuals from different socioeconomic backgrounds whose lives become connected through their developing relationship. Their romance unfolds against family conflicts, financial disparities and circumstances from their shared past.

== Cast ==
- Usama Khan as Maaz
- Syeda Madiha Imam as Mirha
- Aly Khan
- Atiqa Odho
- Zainab Mazhar
- Bakhtawar Mazhar
- Mahnoor Khan
- Saleem Mairaj
- Madiha Rizvi
- Shamil Khan
- Sarah Eijaz Khan
