= Dil-e-Momin =

Pakistani television series

- Written by: Jahanzeb Qamar
- Directed by: Shehrazade Sheikh
- Starring: Faysal Quraishi; Madiha Imam; Momal Sheikh
- Country of origin: Pakistan
- Original language: Urdu
- No. of episodes: 49

Production
- Producers: Abdullah Kadwani; Asad Qureshi
- Production locations: Karachi, Sindh
- Camera setup: Multi-camera setup
- Production company: 7th Sky Entertainment

Original release
- Network: Geo Entertainment
- Release: 12 November 2021 – 30 April 2022

Dil-e-Momin (Urdu: دلِ مومن, lit. 'Heart of a Believer') is a 2021 Pakistani drama television series, produced by Abdullah Kadwani and Asad Qureshi under their banner 7th Sky Entertainment, written by Jahanzeb Qamar and directed by Shehrzade Sheikh. It features Faysal Quraishi, Momal Sheikh and Madiha Imam in lead roles. It first aired on 12 November 2021 on Geo Entertainment.

== Plot ==
Momin (Faysal Quraishi) is a very honest and religious man towards Islam. His family includes his father Shahzad (Javed Sheikh), his mother Zehra (Saba Faisal), and his two sisters Fari (Nida Hussain) and Annie (Zoha Rahman). He wants to be with his childhood sweetheart Ashi (Momal Sheikh), but her father Jameel (Shabbir Jan) disapproves of Momin and fixes Ashi's engagement to Fakhar (Saad Azhar).

Momin becomes a teacher at a university where he meets his student, Maya (Madiha Imam). Maya starts to fall in love with Momin, which causes problems between him and Ashi. Later, Jameel finds out Fakhar's true intentions and breaks him and Ashi's engagement, while also fixing Ashi and Momin's relationship. Maya then starts to obsess over Momin, and later puts a false accusation on Momin for harassment, which breaks his engagement with Ashi and Fari's relationship with Waleed (Haris Waheed). Maya's friend Gohar (Gohar Rasheed) beats Momin up after hearing this.

Maya's mother Seema (Tara Mahmood) and Momin's family question him and Shahzad slaps Momin. Shahzad then suffers a heart attack and dies. Maya starts to regret her actions and goes to Momin's house to ask forgiveness from him, but he pushes her away, crying at his father's grave. Later, Maya tells the truth to Momin's family. Fakhar apologizes to Jameel and Ashi's mother Ansa (Annie Zaidi) and asks to be with Ashi again, for which Jameel agrees.

Later, Maya reveals that she put a false harassment accusation on Momin to the world, and when Momin goes to tell Ashi, he finds out that Ashi and Fakhar have now gotten married. He then leaves in sadness. On their wedding night, Fakhar tells Ashi he is going to America, and will never come back, leaving Ashi alone with his mother Naveeda (Sabiha Hashmi). Ashi hides this from everyone, including Momin, but Jameel and Ansa find out and bring Ashi back home.

Zehra and Fari convince Momin to forgive Maya so Momin and Maya get married. When he is starting to accept Maya, he meets Naveeda and she tells him that Ashi and Fakhar have been separated. This makes Momin want to be with Ashi again. Maya convinces Ashi to be Momin's second wife and Maya's co-wife. After everything, Fari and Waleed get married. The day after Momin and Ashi's wedding, Maya accidentally drops a firestick on Ashi's veil, which makes Momin worried. After Maya meets Gohar, Momin sees this and wonders if Maya is doing bad things with Gohar. And because of Momin's anger towards her, Maya leaves the house.

Momin meets Gohar at the university and he tells Momin that Maya didn't do anything and Gohar did everything bad towards Momin. This makes Momin search for Maya everywhere, in his guilt for mistreating Maya. Ashi then tells Momin that she is pregnant, but later on, she suffers a miscarriage. 3 years later, after Ashi's other pregnancy, Momin finally finds Maya and when he finds her, she tells him that she has forgiven him but she won't go back with him.

When Maya gets the news that Momin has fallen unconscious at a train station, she wakes him up and they go back home together. When Momin and Maya reach the hospital, they find that Momin has had a son, but Zehra tells them that Ashi has died after giving birth. Maya gives Momin a note from Ashi before her death, saying that Momin's happiness is with Maya and that he and Maya should take care of Ashi's child together.

== Cast ==
- Faysal Quraishi as Momin
- Madiha Imam as Maaya
- Momal Sheikh as Ashi
- Saba Faisal as Zehra; Momin's mother
- Javed Sheikh as Shehzad; Momin's father
- Gohar Rasheed as Gohar
- Shabbir Jan as Jamel; Ashi's father
- Annie Zaidi as Ansa; Ashi's mother
- Tara Mahmood as Seeman; Maya's mother
- Haris Waheed as Walaed; Momin's brother-in-law
- Nida Hussain as Fari; Momin's sister
- Zoha Rahman as Annie; Momin's sister
- Tariq Jameel as Molvi Sahab
- Mubassara Khanum as Batool
- Saad Azhar as Fakhar
- Rashid Farooqui (cameo)

== Soundtrack ==
The original soundtrack of Dil-e-Momin is sung by Rahat Fateh Ali Khan, penned by Qamar Nashad and composed by Naveed Nashad.

== Production ==
In June 2021, it reported that Faysal Qureshi, Zara Noor Abbas and Moomal Sheikh paired up for Dil-e-Momin. In same month, Abbas revealed on her Instagram account that she has dropped out of the series due to some personal reasons. Later, Imam replaced her in the character of Maya, thus marked her fourth appearance opposite Qureshi after Zakham (2017), Baba Jani (2018) and Muqaddar (2020). The first teaser of the series was released on 22 October 2021.
