= Ayesha Gul =

Pakistani actress

- Born: 8 August 1980 (age 45); Quetta, Balochistan, Pakistan
- Education: Kyrgyz State Medical Academy (M.D)
- Occupation: Actress
- Years active: 1998 – present

Ayesha Gul is a Pakistani actress. She is known for her roles in Muqaddar, Bechari Qudsia, Mein Na Janoo, Safar Tamam Howa and Damsa.

== Early life ==
Gul was born on 8 August 1980, in Quetta, Pakistan. She completed her studies at Kyrgyz State Medical Academy with a Doctor of Medicine degree.

== Career ==
She made her debut as an actress in 1998 on PTV. She made her acting debut in 2009 in reality show Nachaly. She appeared in a various dramas on PTV Channel playing lead roles in Cactus Kay Phool, Aik Zindagi, Tum Bhul Gayi Hum Ko and Kachra Kundi. In 2009, she played in the feature film Insaano Jaisay Loag. In 2016, Gul appeared in period-drama Mein Sitara, as Jharna Sethi, a superstar Lollywood singer-actress from the 1960s. While reviewing her performance, A reviewer from The Friday Times opinioned that she "is a revelation". In 2017 she did a lead role Dastaar-e-Anaa as Riffat. She was praised by the audience for playing both negative and positive characters. In 2019 she appeared in Mein Na Janoo and Damsa and in 2020 as Farkhanda Begum the lead role in Muqaddar, alongside Faysal Qureshi.

== Filmography ==
=== Television ===
| Year | Title | Role | Network |
|---|---|---|---|
| 2009 | Tanveer Fatima (B.A) | Tanno | Geo tv |
| 2011 | Hawa Rait Aur Aangan | Sania | PTV |
| 2011 | Dolly Aunty Ka Dream Villa | Gulbadan | Geo TV |
| 2011 | Mera Naseeb | Rafia | Hum TV |
| 2011 | Phir Chand Pe Dastak | Anam | Hum TV |
| 2012 | Kis Din Mera Viyah Howay Ga | Dolli | Geo TV |
| 2012 | Roshan Sitara | Neelam | Hum TV |
| 2012 | Nadamat | Zoha | Hum TV |
| 2012 | Teri Raah Main Rul Gai | Farheen | Urdu 1 |
| 2013 | Tootay Huway Per | Saima | Geo TV |
| 2013 | Gohar-e-Nayab | Sajida | A-Plus |
| 2016 | Mein Sitara | Jharna | TV One |
| 2017 | Dastaar e Anaa | Riffat | TV One |
| 2018 | Maa Sadqey | Naila | Hum TV |
| 2018 | Teri Meri Kahani | Asifa | Hum TV |
| 2018 | Zun Mureed | Huma | Hum TV |
| 2018 | Kaif-e-Baharan | Asma | Geo Entertainment |
| 2019 | Riwaaj | Samina | Urdu 1 |
| 2019 | Qadam Qadam Ishq | Hadia | A Plus |
| 2019 | Makafaat | Nausheen | Geo TV |
| 2019 | Mein Na Janoo | Tehmina | Hum TV |
| 2019 | Damsa | Sofia | ARY Digital |
| 2020 | Hamare Dada Ki Wasiyat | Falak | Express Entertainment |
| 2020 | Makafaat Season 2 | Rabia | Geo Entertainment |
| 2020 | Dikhawa | Zakia | Geo Entertainment |
| 2020 | Muqaddar | Farkhanda Begum | Geo Entertainment |
| 2020 | Mehar Posh | Aisha | Geo TV |
| 2020 | Fitrat | Sadia | Geo Entertainment |
| 2020 | Main Agar Chup Hoon | Shameem | Geo Entertainment |
| 2020 | Aik Aur Munafiq | Ghazala | Geo Entertainment |
| 2021 | Khwaab Nagar Ki Shehzadi | Naila | ARY Digital |
| 2021 | Safar Tamam Howa | Nazli | Hum TV |
| 2021 | Makafaat Season 3 | Maham | Geo Entertainment |
| 2021 | Dikhawa Season 2 | Masooma | Geo Entertainment |
| 2021 | Sirat-e-Mustaqeem | Dania | ARY Digital |
| 2021 | Bechari Qudsia | Rania | Geo Entertainment |
| 2021 | Banno | Sajida | Geo TV |
| 2021 | Aye Musht-E-Khaak | Abida | Geo Entertainment |
| 2022 | Aik Sitam Aur | Raeesa | ARY Digital |
| 2022 | Mamlaat | Nafeesa | Geo TV |
| 2022 | Dikhawa Season 3 | Zebunnisa | Geo Entertainment |
| 2022 | Sirat-e-Mustaqeem Season 2 | Shazia | ARY Digital |
| 2022 | Makafaat Season 4 | Rabia | Geo Entertainment |
| 2022 | Dil Awaiz | Durdana | Geo Entertainment |
| 2022 | Aitraaf | Maya | Aan TV |
| 2022 | Chauraha | Seema | Geo TV |
| 2022 | Hum 2 Hamaray 1000 | Bilquis | Aan TV |
| 2022 | Zindagi Aik Paheli | Kulsoom | Geo TV |
| 2023 | Mere Ban Jao | Salma | Hum TV |
| 2023 | Makafaat Season 5 | Hamna | Geo Entertainment |
| 2023 | Dikhawa Season 4 | Rubina | Geo Entertainment |
| 2023 | Sirf Tum | Amina | Geo Entertainment |
| 2023 | Jindo | Kajli | Green Entertainment |
| 2023 | Motia Sarkar | Gulshan | TV One |
| 2023 | Kalank | Romana | Geo Entertainment |
| 2023 | Maa Nahi Saas Hoon Main | Shaista | Geo Entertainment |
| 2024 | Dao | Nuzhat | Geo Entertainment |
| 2024 | Makafaat Season 6 | Rubina | Geo Entertainment |
| 2024 | Ishqaway | Makho | Geo Entertainment |
| 2024 | Mehroom | Rukhsana | Geo TV |
| 2024 | Tark-e-Wafa | Kanwal | ARY Digital |
| 2024 | Haq Mehar | Fatima | Geo Entertainment |
| 2024 | Teray Janay Kay Baad | Saleha | ARY Digital |
| 2024 | Aafat | Shireen | Geo Entertainment |
| 2024 | Bajjo | Saba | Geo TV |
| 2025 | Bekhaway | Rasheeda | Geo Entertainment |
| 2025 | Pathar Dil | Majida | Geo TV |
| 2026 | Ishq Mein Tere Sadqay | Sajida | Geo Entertainment |
| 2026 | Ay Dushman-e-Jaan | Samina | Express Entertainment |

=== Telefilm ===
| Year | Title | Role |
|---|---|---|
| 2016 | Gumshuda Mehbooba | Rani |
| 2017 | Teen Unglian | Sereen |
| 2017 | Zara Palat Kar Dekho | Rubina |
| 2018 | Sarrab- The Mirage | Wajiha |
| 2021 | Filmy Siyappa | Nazish |
| 2025 | Ghost Meri Dost | Farheen |

=== Film ===
| Year | Title | Role |
|---|---|---|
| 2009 | Insaano Jaisay Loag | Mahnoor |
| 2023 | Teri Meri Kahaniyaan | Rumaisa's mother |
