= Chauraha (TV series) =

Pakistani television series

- Title screen
- Urdu: چوراہا
- Genre: Crime drama; Social; Romance
- Written by: Edison Idrees Masih
- Directed by: Aehsun Talish
- Starring: Madiha Imam; Mikaal Zulfiqar; Asad Siddiqui; Bushra Ansari; Saba Hameed; Behroze Sabzwari; Arisha Razi
- Opening theme: Aima Baig
- Original language: Urdu
- No. of episodes: 34

Production
- Producers: Abdullah Kadwani; Asad Qureshi
- Camera setup: Multi-camera
- Production company: 7th Sky Entertainment

Original release
- Network: Har Pal Geo
- Release: 31 May – 3 October 2022

Chauraha (transl. Crossroads) is a Pakistani television series directed by Aehsun Talish and produced by Abdullah Kadwani and Asad Qureshi under their banner 7th Sky Entertainment. The series focusses on the perils of social media. It features Madiha Imam, Asad Siddiqui and Mikaal Zulfiqar in leading roles with Bushra Ansari, Saba Hameed, Behroze Sabzwari and Arisha Razi in supporting roles. It first aired on 31 May 2022 on Har Pal Geo.

== Plot ==
Zoya (Madiha Imam) is a poor, young and naive college student, who lives with her mother Shireen (Saba Hameed) and aunt Naseem (Bushra Ansari). Zoya has a cousin Arsal (Asad Siddiqui), who likes her, but Zoya avoids him. Zoya starts feeling insecure after all her college friends complain about Zoya not having a boyfriend and not living a luxurious life, so she creates a fake social media account where she posts pictures and selfies of herself doing normal things, making people think she is rich. She then befriends a person called "Pretty Neha" on Facebook.

"Pretty Neha" is actually revealed to be Junaid (Mikaal Zulfiqar), a young man who kidnaps rich girls for ransom with the help of his friends. Junaid's widowed father Saleem (Behroze Sabzwari) owns a factory, and he has a crush on Shireen, who also happens to work at his office. Shireen's husband has passed away. Saleem keeps asking for Shireen's hand in marriage, and Shireen constantly keeps rejecting him. Zoya then goes to meet Pretty Neha, but when Junaid shows up and tells her the truth, she leaves in anger. Junaid then kidnaps Zoya.

For the next two days, Zoya is held hostage by Junaid and his friends. Junaid then finds out that Zoya isn't rich. His friends try to rape Zoya, but when Junaid sees this, he beats them up and rescues Zoya and takea her back to her house. Zoya curses Junaid, saying that he will be punished for his sins. People then start having suspicions on why Zoya was out of the house for two days, and as a result of this, Naseem faces a heart attack and dies. Shireen and Zoya are forced to live alone, but they are forced to live with Saleem, therefore getting Saleem and Shireen married. Shireen and Zoya move to Saleem's house and Zoya reunites with Junaid. Junaid's little sister Naila (Arisha Razi) then starts to taunt Zoya and Shireen.

Naila's cousin Sikandar arrives from Dubai, and wants to marry Naila, but when Sikandar goes to her house, he starts to like Zoya instead, angering his mother. Arsal takes his parents to Zoya's house for their relationship, and Zoya agrees to this, which upsets Junaid since he starts to like Zoya. Junaid's friends arrive at Zoya and Arsal's engagement and asks him about some money, and Junaid feels embarrassed in front of a lot of people. His friends then kidnap Zoya again, but Junaid finds out where Zoya is and rescues her after beating up his friends.

Arsal goes to meet Zoya, and he asks her if she can tell everyone why she was kidnapped twice, which makes Zoya mad and she breaks her relationship with Arsal. Shireen then asks Zoya about how Junaid knew where Zoya was. Junaid confesses to Saleem that he kidnapped Zoya. The police then come to their house and arrest Junaid, because both of his friends' fathers went to the police to get him arrested. Junaid confesses to everyone that he kidnapped Zoya and multiple women for money, which shocks everyone, especially Naila, since she wondered how Junaid is always supporting Zoya.

Shireen then asks Zoya why she didn't tell her, to which Zoya tells her that she didn't want to break her mother's marriage with Saleem, and they would become homeless again with this truth. Naila and Sikandar's mother start becoming nice to Zoya, after mistreating her since Shireen and Saleem's marriage. Saleem goes to jail to meet Junaid, but Junaid tells his father that this is his punishment, and he has to endure it. After some time, Junaid is released from jail and he asks for forgiveness from Shireen, and she forgives him, but he leaves again after finding out that Zoya is coming from her job in Islamabad.

After spending some time with her family in Karachi, Zoya has no choice but to go with Junaid back to Islamabad. On the way, Junaid asks for forgiveness and asks if he can marry her. Zoya then tells Junaid that if he would marry her if he was in her place, to which Junaid replies no, meaning that Zoya wants to stay independent and doesn't want to get married. Zoya is satisfied after hearing this, and she leaves the car and goes inside the girl's hostel, leaving Junaid in the rain heartbroken.

== Cast ==
- Madiha Imam as Zoya; a naive college student Shireen daughter and Saleem stepdaughter
- Asad Siddiqui as Arsal; Zoya's neighbor
- Mikaal Zulfiqar as Junaid Saleem “Johnny BhaI; Zoya's Kidnapper. Later Zoya Stepbrother
- Saba Hameed as Shireen; Zoya's mother & Later marries to Saleem
- Bushra Ansari as Naseem; Zoya's aunt (phuppo)
- Behroze Sabzwari as Saleem; Junaid's and Naila father, husband of Shireen Saleem and stepfather to Zoya
- Ayesha Gul as Seema; Arsal's mother
- Arisha Razi as Naila Saleem; Junaid's sister and Zoya Stepsister.
- Hamza Tariq
- Taqi Ahmed

== Soundtrack ==
"Main Na Janoon"

Song by Aima Baig and Shani Arshad
- Language: Urdu
- Released: 27 May 2022
- Length: 4:30
- Label: Geo
- Songwriter: Sabir Zafar
- Producer: 7th Sky Entertainment
External media
Audio
- Full OST on JioSaavn
Video
- Video on YouTube

The official soundtrack of the series is performed by Aima Baig and Shani Arshad on the lyrics of Sabir Zafar with music composition by Arshad.
