= Ishqiya (TV series) =

2020 Pakistani television series

- Official title card
- عشقيہ
- Genre: Family drama Revenge; Romantic drama
- Created by: ARY
- Written by: Mohsin Ali Shah
- Directed by: Badar Mehmood
- Starring: Feroze Khan; Hania Aamir; Ramsha Khan; Gohar Rasheed
- Theme music composer: SK Salman Khan; Deniss Tanveer; Sk Studio
- Opening theme: "Ishqiya" by Asim Azhar
- Composer: SK Salman Khan
- Country of origin: Pakistan
- Original language: Urdu
- No. of seasons: 1
- No. of episodes: 28

Production
- Producers: Fahad Mustafa; Dr. Ali Kazmi
- Camera setup: Multi-camera setup
- Running time: 38–85 minutes
- Production company: Big Bang Entertainment

Original release
- Network: ARY Digital
- Release: 3 February – 10 August 2020

Ishqiya (Urdu: عشقيہ; transl. Passionate) is a 2020 Pakistani television drama that originally aired from 3 February 2020 to 10 August 2020 on ARY Digital. Produced by Fahad Mustafa and Dr. Ali Kazmi under Big Bang Entertainment, it follows a story of love, trust and betrayal which revolves around the main characters, Hamza, Rumaisa and Hamna, played by Feroze Khan, Hania Aamir and Ramsha Khan, respectively.

At the ARY People Choice Awards 2020, the series won eight out of eighteen nominations, including: Favorite Drama Serial- Regular Format, Favorite Director for Badar Mehmood, and Favorite Actor for Feroze Khan. The series also aired on MBC Bollywood in the Arab World, during Ramadan 2021.

== Plot ==
Sisters Hamna and Rumaisa (aka Rumi) were raised by protective parents. Hamna is quiet, calm, and reserved, while Rumi is carefree, outgoing, and talkative. Hamna and her college classmate, Hamza, have been dating for four years and are madly in love with each other. Hamza is rather possessive about her as well, violently so. Hamna is hesitant to tell her father about him, as he doesn't believe in love marriages. Due to her father's sickness and fear of him losing his respect, Hamna marries her father's friend's son, Azeem, on his insistence. She hides this from Hamza and avoids him for a while. When Hamza finally finds out, he screams at Hamna in front of everyone at their university. Heartbroken and betrayed, Hamza meets with a car accident and is severely injured. Hamna prays for his recovery, and he survives.

After regaining consciousness, Hamza vows to take revenge. He soon reaches Hamna's house with his parents to ask for Rumi's hand in marriage. Hamna is shocked by this and opposes this marriage. She tries to stop everyone but fails as Hamza blackmails her using all her messages and videos in which she expresses love for him. Hamza manages to marry Rumi, and the couple has a common reception. On the side, Alishba, Hamza's mother's partner's daughter, who was in love with him, is heartbroken and jealous. Rumi finds Hamza cute and is happy with the marriage.

After the marriage, Hamza often calls Hamna, sometimes to make her feel guilty for what she did, and sometimes to scare her by saying that he will mistreat Rumi. Due to continuous hushed calls and Hamna's distant and distracted behaviour, Azeem becomes suspicious but does not question Hamna. Due to Rumi's carefree and lively nature, Hamza falls for her, but does not realize it. He enjoys spending time with her, and she brings him joy as he has never known. Also, with Rumi being possessive of him, he begins to realize that he and Rumi have more similarities than he and Hamna.

On Rumi's insistence, Hamza joins his father's business. For vengeance, Hamza gifts Azeem and Hamna honeymoon tickets, and both couples go on their honeymoon together. There, Hamza continues to blackmail Hamna and thrashes a man for staring at her. This makes Azeem more suspicious. Siddique Sahab (Hamna and Rumi's father) falls severely ill and is admitted to the hospital, but no one is aware of it except their mother. Alishba, who still has feelings for Hamza, notices Hamza staring at Hamna and digs up their past and goes to their university to collect proof. As Rumi is more attached to her father, she immediately realises that something is wrong and asks Hamza to return. Once home, she becomes furious at her mother for not informing her of her father's illness.

Hamna confesses to Azeem about Hamza and her past, and while he feels betrayed, he vows to protect her.

Siddiqui Sahab passes away, and Rumi is shattered and feels betrayed for not being able to help him. Azeem continues to behave coldly with Hamna, but does not reveal to anyone about her past and the truth. When Hamza comforts Rumi after her father's death, she asks him whether he loves her, to which he nods. Rumi asks him not to give her any false hopes and always remember that she too loves him. Rumi, being unaware of the motive behind marrying her, advises Hamza not to become selfish in love and value others' love as well. Hamza hugs her, and his senses become overshadowed by her. He confesses the same to his confidant, Shariq, that Rumi's tears make him uneasy, and her happiness and well-being matter to him the most. Shariq says he has fallen in love with her, which Hamza denies, saying he has no place for love in his heart. Shariq tells him that Allah is much greater than his power of revenge, and Allah has supported his love for Rumi. He advises him to give up on his revenge and accept his defeat (as he is in love with Rumaisa).

Azeem warns Hamza of coming near Hamna and the consequences of his actions. Hamza, having accepted his love for Rumi, asks Hamna to end this game, and that he has deleted all her messages. When Hamna thinks it is his fear speaking, Hamza reveals that he is in love with Rumi. Hamna does not believe him and asks him to tell her the truth, if he really loves her, to which he agrees.

When Hamza goes home to tell Rumi the truth, she tells Hamza that she is pregnant. Hamza requests that Azeem not reveal the truth to Rumi because of her pregnancy. Azeem and Hamna agree to do the same. Everything seems to be going right. But on Rumi's baby shower, Alishba tells her the truth about Hamza and Hamna. Rumi slaps her, but still has doubts.

The next day, she goes to Hamna's house, and on being asked, Hamna tells her the truth. Rumi returns to her in-laws' house and starts packing. When Hamza asks her where she is going, Rumi confronts him. She says that she realises that she was only his revenge and that their love was a lie. Hamza tries to explain, but Rumi slaps him and tells him not to touch her. She returns to her mother's house and is devastated. Hamna tells her that Hamza was blackmailing her not to tell Rumi anything. Rumi tells the truth to her in-laws, and her mother also hears about it. Hamza's family is ashamed and angry at his actions. Hamza tries to tell Rumi that he loves her, but she tells him that he only loves himself. Rumi asks him to blackmail her and show her love messages to everyone, not caring that she is his wife. Because he didn't care that Hamna is someone's sister, daughter, and wife. Due to weakness, she has a miscarriage, devastating Rumi. However, she pulls herself together and forgives her mother. Azeem and Rumi forgive Hamna, and Rumi files for divorce. In the end, Hamna gets pregnant, and Rumi is shown living a happy, independent life with her mother. Hamza is shown to be sitting alone with toys he bought for his unborn child all around him, seemingly broken and depressed, thinking about his past with Rumi and Hamna.

== Cast ==
=== Main ===
- Feroze Khan as Hamza Khalid: Khalid & Saman's son, Zoya's brother, Rumaisa's ex-husband (Main Antagonist)
- Hania Aamir as Rumaisa "Rumi" Siddique / Rumaisa Hamza: Awais and Rukhsana's daughter, Hamza's ex-wife, Hamna's sister (Female Protagonist)
- Ramsha Khan as Hamna Siddique / Hamna Azeem: Awais and Rukhsana's daughter, Azeem's wife, Rumi's sister (2nd Female Protagonist)
- Gohar Rasheed as Azeem Kashif: Kashif and Nabeela's son. Hamna's husband (Male Protagonist)

=== Recurring ===
- Khalid Anam as Khalid: Hamza and Zoya's father, Saman's husband
- Seemi Pasha as Saman Khalid: Hamza and Zoya's mother, Khalid's wife
- Shabbir Jan as Awais Siddique: Rumi and Hamna's father
- Kinza Malik as Rukhsana Siddique: Rumi and Hamna's mother; Awais's wife
- Zahid Qureshi as Kashif: Nabeela's husband, Azeem's father
- Nabeela Khan as Nabeela Kashif: Kashif's wife, Azeem's mother
- Maha Hasan as Zoya Khalid: Hamza's sister
- Mahrunisa Iqbal as Alishba Khawar: Khawar's daughter
- Rizwan Baig as Shariq: Hamza's friend
- Faakhir Mehmood as Imaan Shaab

== Production ==
Ramsha Khan revealed that she was offered Rumi's role (later played by Hania Amir), but she chose Hamna's character. Khan said, "As an actor, I perceived Hamna’s personality as a socially awkward and inexpressive person. She was stuck in the middle of family and love, and I thought it would be a bigger challenge to play a role on such a lower pitch."

== Soundtrack ==
Ishqiya

Soundtrack album by Asim Azhar
- Released: 7 February 2020
- Recorded: 2020
- Genre: Television soundtrack
- Length: 3:12
- Language: Urdu
- Label: ARY Digital

Music video
- "OST: Ishqiya" on YouTube

The original soundtrack is sung and composed by Asim Azhar. Lyrics were written by Asim Azhar himself, along with Hassan Ali and Raamis. It received more than 17 million views on YouTube. The female version, which is played within episodes and sometimes at the end, is sung by Kaiynat John.

== Awards and nominations ==
Date of ceremony	Award = 1st Diamond superme foam and Pakola award	Category	Recipient(s)	Result	Ref
March 2021	ARY People's Choice Awards	Favorite Drama Serial- Regular Format	Ishqiya	Won
March 2021	ARY People's Choice Awards	Favorite Ost	Ishqiya	Won
March 2021	ARY People's Choice Awards	Favorite Director	Badar Mehmood	Won
March 2021	ARY People's Choice Awards	Favorite Writer	Mohsin Ali	Nominated
March 2021	ARY People's Choice Awards	Favorite Actor	Feroze Khan	Won
March 2021	ARY People's Choice Awards	Favorite Actress	Hania Aamir	Nominated
March 2021	ARY People's Choice Awards	Favorite Actor in a role of Bahu	Hania Aamir	Nominated
March 2021	ARY People's Choice Awards	Favorite Actor in a role of Bhabhi	Hania Aamir	Nominated
March 2021	ARY People's Choice Awards	Favorite Actor in a role of Behen	Hania Aamir	Won
March 2021	ARY People's Choice Awards	Favorite Actor in a role of Behen	Maha Hasan	Nominated
March 2021	ARY People's Choice Awards	Favorite Actor in a role of Husband	Gohar Rasheed	Nominated
March 2021	ARY People's Choice Awards	Favorite Actor in a role of Damad	Gohar Rasheed	Won
March 2021	ARY People's Choice Awards	Favorite Actor in a role of Wife	Ramsha Khan	Nominated
March 2021	ARY People's Choice Awards	Favorite Actor in a role of Saas	Seemi Pasha	Won
March 2021	ARY People's Choice Awards	Favorite Actor in a role of Sasur	Khalid Anum	Won
March 2021	ARY People's Choice Awards	Favorite Actor in a role of Baap	Shabbir Jan	Nominated
March 2021	ARY People's Choice Awards	Favorite Actor in a role of Behtreen Dost	Rizwan Baig	Nominated
March 2021	ARY People's Choice Awards	Favorite Jori	Feroze Khan and Hania Aamir	Nominated
November 5, 2021	Pakistan International Screen Awards	Best Original Soundtrack	Ishq Kiya- Asim Azhar	Won
November 5, 2021	Pakistan International Screen Awards	Best Television Actor (Popular)	Feroze Khan	Won
November 5, 2021	Pakistan International Screen Awards	Best Television Actress (Popular)	Hania Amir	Nominated
