= Dhaani (serial) =

Pakistani television series

- Title Card
- Genre: Family drama Romantic drama
- Created by: Babar Javed
- Written by: Hashim Nadeem
- Directed by: Ali Faizan
- Starring: Sami Khan; Madiha Imam; Shezray Husain
- Theme music composer: Saad Sultan
- Opening theme: Aap Baithay Hain by Zamad Baig
- Country of origin: Pakistan
- Original language: Urdu
- No. of seasons: 1
- No. of episodes: 30

Production
- Producer: Babar Javed
- Production locations: Lahore, Pakistan
- Camera setup: Multi-camera setup
- Running time: 38 minutes
- Production company: 7th Sky Entertainment

Original release
- Network: Geo Entertainment
- Release: 12 July 2016 – 14 February 2017

Dhaani is a Pakistani television drama serial that first aired on Geo Tv on 12 July 2016 and ended on 14 February 2017. It is written by Hashim Nadeem, produced by Babar Javed and directed by Ali Faizan. It stars Sami Khan and Madiha Imam.

Dhaani revolves around Sameer (Sami Khan), a carefree person who parties hard until Dhaani (Madiha Imam) becomes the love of his life. He fights for Dhaani and forms deep connections along the way.

== Plot ==
Dhaani lives with her father Kaleem Ud Din, aunt Bee Jee, her cousin Raja and sister Shaani in an old neighbourhood in Lahore. Sameer, who is studying abroad, returns to Pakistan and lives with his mother, father Rehan Seth, brother Tanveer and his sister-in-law in an elite, suburban neighbourhood in Lahore. Kaleem Ud Din has been working for Rehan Seth's family's business for forty-seven years, and knows Sameer's family very well. Sameer's family also owns a house in the old neighbourhood right next to Dhaani's home. Sameer's father's business has an alliance with the business of his friend, a politician, Riasat, whose daughter Maya is Sameer's best friend. Rehan Seth is running for local elections in the old neighbourhood alongside Riasat.

Dhaani and Sameer first see each other during a kite competition in the old neighbourhood. They meet face to face after Dhaani climbs down from her rooftop to get empty wine bottles from the rooftop at Sameer's house who has had a party. Sameer catches Dhaani trespassing and makes a bet with Dhaani. He tells her that if she doesn't win the bet, he is going to eat her pet chicken, named Babra Sharif (after the famous film actress). Dhaani accepts the bet but fails in fulfilling it and whilst out with Bee Jee, Dhaani and her sister Shaani meet up with Sameer. But instead of giving her chicken to Sameer, she takes him to have chaat. Soon after Bee Jee calls both Dhaani and Shaani. Before Dhaani can run away, Sameer grabs Dhaani and gives her his own mobile phone on which he has already added his number. Dhaani and Sameer spend the next couple of days talking over the phone in secret. Dhaani has to hide the phone because phones are banned at her house and Sameer talks to Dhaani when his fiancé Maya isn't nearby as he knows that she would not approve. After having frequently spoken on the phone and met each other in person a few times, Dhaani begins to fall in love with Sameer, although this love is not reciprocated.

Dhaani thinks that Sameer wants to marry her and tells him to hurry up and send his parents over so they can marry before someone else does. Dhaani is heartbroken when Sameer informs her that he only saw her as a friend and nothing more, resulting in Dhaani ending whatever they had between them. Sameer's and Maya's parents then arrange their engagement without notifying Sameer beforehand. Because of this, Sameer's behaviour changes. Dhaani is the only thing on his mind. He constantly calls Dhaani who keeps telling him to never ring her again and hangs up. Dhaani is then engaged to Amjad, and their engagement party is arranged on the same day as Sameer's and Maya's engagement. After the engagements, Sameer then goes with his friend to the same rooftop the day he and Dhaani met and waits for her. Dhaani comes out onto the rooftop without knowing Sameer is waiting for her. Sameer climbs the ladder leading to Dhaani's rooftop and talks to her. They get caught by Sameer's fiancé Maya who gets upset. Sameer who is going crazy about Dhaani not being his friend, begins to fall in love with her, and breaks his engagement off with Maya. After finding out that Kaleem Ud Din's daughter was the reason why Sameer broke off his engagement with Maya, Rehan Seth, out of anger, fires Kaleem Ud Din. This results in Kaleem Ud Din losing respect in his neighbourhood, for which he blames Sameer. Riasat is also angry with Sameer for breaking off his engagement with his daughter, and takes his vengeance out on Sameer's father by kicking him out of his political party. Rehan Seth now feels that Sameer is the reason for all of this, and never wishes to see him again unless he marries Maya.

Days later Sameer packs his bags, leaving behind all his valuables, passport and credit cards, and sets off to find a job. He goes and finds a man called Babu Botal who lives in the same neighbourhood as Dhaani. Babu Botal is more understanding and sympathetic of Sameer's situation than anyone else in the neighbourhood, since he himself had been in a similar one years ago. Sameer is hated by everyone in the neighbourhood. He goes to Dhaani's house and tells her that he loves her, but Dhaani tells him that it's too late to say that and closes the door. Babu Botal finds Sameer a job coincidentally at the same place where Dhaani's fiancé works as the boss. Sameer and Amjad meet for the first time. Sameer doesn't know that Amjad is Dhaani's fiancé and Amjad doesn't know what happened between Dhaani and Sameer. Sameer starts working at his new job without knowing that Kaleem Ud Din comes now and then to meet Amjad. Sameer is thrashed by Dhaani's cousin Raja and his group. After seeing Kaleem Ud Din at the office, Sameer gives a resignation letter to Amjad. Sameer soon starts earning the trust of the neighborhood after helping everyone out. He also tells the locals to form their own political party and contend the elections themselves, rather than voting for Riasat's party. Sameer starts teaching English and Maths at a school in the neighbourhood. His ex-fiancée soon finds him and tries to bring him back home, but Sameer refuses. Dhaani arranges to meet with Sameer at the local mazaar to beg him to go back home and to never see her again, but at the same time, acknowledging that she knows he loves her. Raja's friend sees them together and quickly informs Raja about this. Sameer, now heartbroken, gets beaten up, and intentionally doesn't put up a fight and is nearly killed. Raja and his friends get arrested, but are released from prison by Sameer. Sameer's family hear about this and one by one they come to meet him in the hospital except his father, Rehan Seth. They all tell him to come home but Sameer again refuses. The only thing Sameer wants his father to do is go and ask for forgiveness from Kaleem Ud Din, but his father refuses. Amjad learns of Sameer and Dhaani's situation and goes to Dhaani's house to tell her father, after which, he breaks off the engagement with Dhaani.

Soon after this, Sameer is released from the hospital. Kaleem Ud Din decides to get Dhaani married to her cousin Raja, and asks his sister Bee Jee for permission, to which she agrees. Raja then finds out that Dhaani loves Sameer and goes to Kaleem Ud Din and asks him to let Dhaani and Sameer get married, which results in Kaleem Ud Din getting infuriated and slapping Raja. Riasat finds out that the reason he is losing the elections in the neighbourhood is because of Sameer, and forms a riot to attack Sameer but is met with an equal force from the locals to help Sameer. Maya tells this to Sameer's parents. Rehan Seth goes with his family to Kaleem Ud Din's house and asks for forgiveness, to which Dhaani's father accepts. Rehan Seth also asks for Dhaani's hand in marriage for his son Sameer. Though initially reluctant, Kaleem Ud Din realises that the only way to resolve the issue it to allow Sameer and Dhaani to have what they want, and so he accepts. Sameer's family leave Kaleem Ud Din's house where the whole neighbourhood is outside waiting for an answer. Rehan Seth tells the news and everyone is overjoyed. The scene then cuts to Sameer and Dhaani, now married, who are on the rooftop happily together while Sameer puts his hand around Dhaani and they both enjoy the view from Dhaani's roof.

== Cast ==
- Sami Khan as Sameer
- Madiha Imam as Dhaani
- Tauqeer Nasir as Sheikh Kaleem ud Din
- Azra Aftab as Bee Jee
- Mubarak Ali as Raja
- Dania Enwer as Shaani
- Shezray as Maya
- Mohsin Ali as Tanveer
- Kamran Mujahid as Babu Botal
- Asad Malik as Rehan Seth
- Ayesha Sana as Rehan Seth's wife
- Imtiaz Ali Bhacho
- Bilal
- Mohsin
- Ali Khawar
- Raja Feroz
- Gulfam Khan
- Faheem Muzzaffar as Amjad

== See also ==
- List of programs broadcast by Geo TV
- List of Pakistani television serials
