= Haris Waheed =

Pakistani actor

- حارث وحید
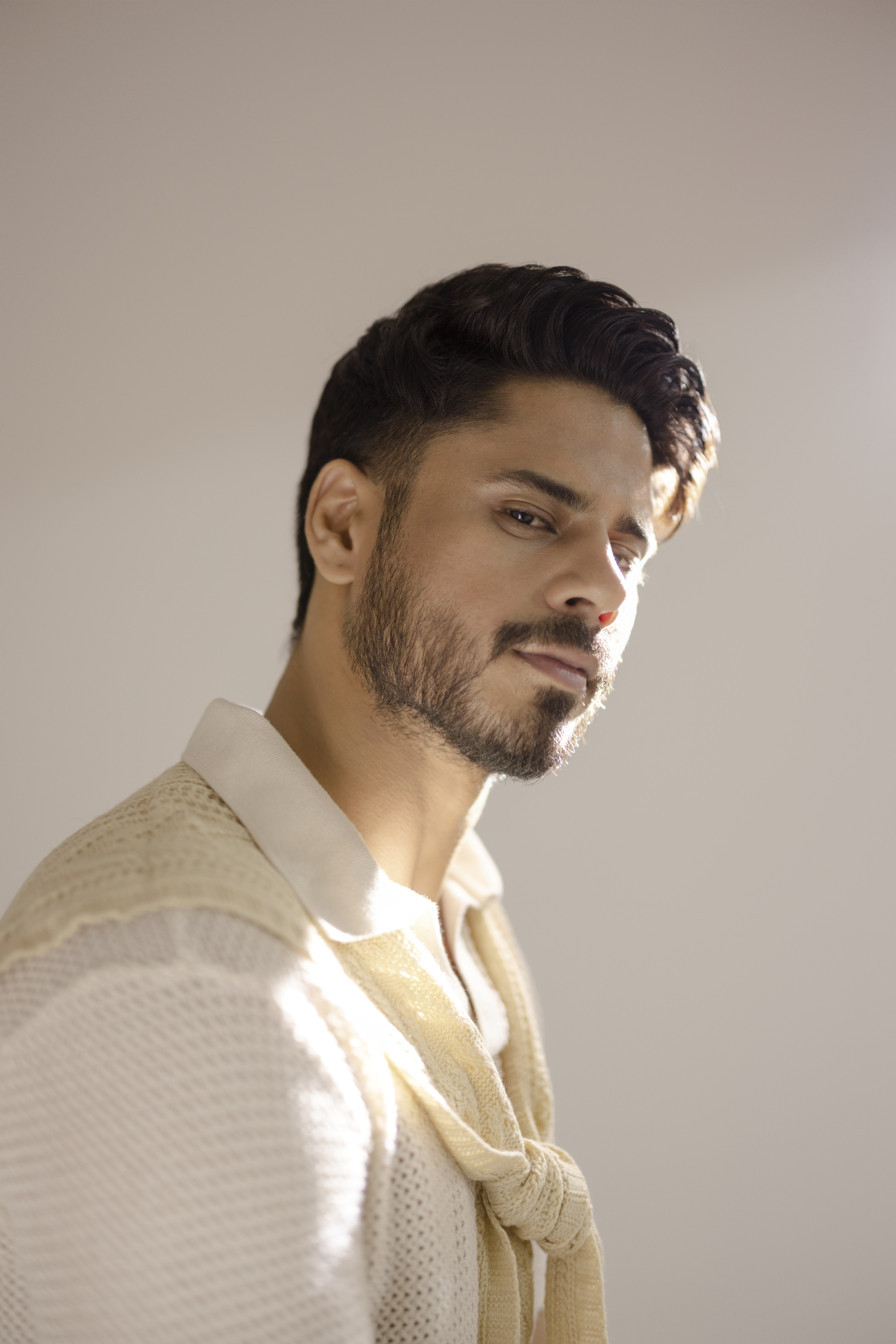
- Haris Waheed in June 2025
- Occupation: Actor
- Years active: 2014 – Present
- Spouse: Maryam Fatima (m. 2018; div. 2022)
- Website: haariswaheed.com

Haris Waheed is a Pakistani actor. Waheed is best known for portraying the role of Waqas Jutt in Momina Duraid's and Johns Hopkins University Center for Communication Programs drama serial Sammi, Zafar in Do Bol and Ilyas in Momina Duraid's and Kashf Foundation drama serial Udaari. More recently, he portrayed Tabraiz Murad Ali Shah in Jaan-e-Jahan.

== Personal life ==
Haris Waheed married Pakistani actress, Maryam Fatima on 23 May 2018. The couple divorced in 2022.

== Career ==
In 2016 he played a character in Udaari. In 2017 he played the lead antagonist Waqas Jutt in the Hum TV drama serial Sammi.

== Filmography ==
=== Films ===
Year	Title	Role	Director	Notes
2019	Altered Skin	Cameo	Adnan Ahmed	As Police Officer
2021	Daughter by Law	Adnan Isfahani	Armughan Hassan	Released on Digestive Showtime (Youtube)

=== Television ===
Year	Title	Role	Network	Notes	Ref(s)
2014	Sadqay Tumhare	Imtiaz Janjua	Hum TV	Television Debut	
2015	Alvida	Saim	Hum TV		
2016	Mann Mayal	Mikael's friend	Hum TV	Guest appearance	
2016	Shaam Dhaley	Faizan	Geo Entertainment		
2016	Udaari	Ilyas	Hum TV		
2017	Phir Wohi Mohabbat	Shahryar	Hum TV		
2017	Sammi	Waqas Jutt	Hum TV		
2018	Bisaat e Dil	Hannan	Hum TV		
2018	Tu Jo Nahi	Sameer			
2018	Ghughi	Sukh Chand	TV One		
2018	Naulakha	Rohail	Geo Entertainment		
2019	Piya Naam Ka Diya	Ammar	Geo Entertainment		
2019	Do Bol	Zafar	ARY Digital		
2019	Pakeezah Phuppho	Bilal			
2019	Mera Qasoor	Bilal			
2019	Naqab Zan	Raheel	Hum TV		
2020	Muqaddar	Hassan Sherazi	Geo Entertainment		
2020	Makafaat		Geo Entertainment	Episode:"Cousins", "Soutelapan"	
2020	Dikhawa		Geo Entertainment	Episode "Dil Ke Armaan"	
2020	The Mazedaar Show	As Himself			
2020	Mera Maan Rakhna	Sheraaz			
2020	Aye Mohabbat				
2020	Aik Aur Munafiq		Geo Entertainment	Episode "Jhatka"	
2020	Kasa-e-Dil	Noman	Geo Entertainment		
2021	Qayamat	Saad	Geo Entertainment		
2021	Safar Tamam Howa	Nabeel	Hum TV		
2021	Mujhay Vida Kar	Aneeq	ARY Digital		
2021	Dour	Adil	Geo Entertainment		
2021	Mohabbat Chor Di Maine	Bazil	Geo Entertainment	Supporting role	
2021	Dil-e-Momin	Waleed	Geo Entertainment		
2022	Inteqam	Shahzad	Geo Entertainment	Supporting role	
2022	Saaya (season 2)	Ahsan	Geo Entertainment		
2022	Meray Humnasheen	Hasan Shahryar	Geo Entertainment		
2022	Meri Hai Kiya Khata	Taimoor	Aan TV		
2022	Tere Bin	Naurez Khan	Geo Entertainment		
2023	Jaan-e-Jahan	Tabrez Murad Ali Shah	ARY Digital		
2023	Tumharey Husn Kay Naam	Umar	Green Entertainment		
2024	Yaar-e-Mann	Salaar	Green Entertainment		
2024	Girhein	Rashid	Geo Entertainment		
2024	Contractors	Police officer (SHO)	Geo Entertainment	Mini Series	
2025	Raaja Rani	Raaja	Hum TV	Supporting role	
2025	Pamaal	Anas (aka Anni)	Green Entertainment		
2026	Maa	Zaryoun	Green Entertainment		
2026	Bas Tera Saath Ho	Shayaan Mursaleen	ARY Digital	Supporting role	
2026	Bano	Shehryar	Geo Entertainment		
2026	Lagan Lagi	Daniyal	ARY Digital		

=== Telefilms ===
Year	Title	Role	Network
2021	Hangor S-131	Lt Cdr Noori Pasha	ARY Digital
2025	Miss B.A Pass	Rafay	ARY Digital

== Awards and nominations ==
Year	Award	Category	Work	Result	Ref(s)
2025	2nd Sukoon Kya Drama Hai Icon Awards	Best Performance in a Negative Role (Critics’ Choice)	Jaan-e-Jahan	Nominated	
2025	2nd Sukoon Kya Drama Hai Icon Awards	Best Performance in a Negative Role (Popular Choice)	Jaan-e-Jahan	Nominated	
