= Ishq Mein Teray =

- Promotional poster
- Genre: Drama, Romantic
- Written by: Sadia Akhtar
- Directed by: Faheem Burney
- Starring: Mehwish Hayat; Azfar Rehman; Madiha Imam; Shahzad Nawaz
- Country of origin: Pakistan
- Original language: Urdu
- No. of episodes: 18

Production
- Producer: Syed Afzal Ali

Original release
- Network: Hum TV
- Release: 27 November 2013 – 26 March 2014

Ishq Mein Teray (Urdu: عشق میں تیرے, English In Your Love) is a Pakistani drama serial airing on Hum TV directed by Faheem Burney, produced by Syed Afzal Ali, and written by Sadia Akhtar. The serial was first aired on 27 November 2013, starring Mehwish Hayat, Azfar Rehman, Madiha Imam, and Shahzad Nawaz, and the final episode was broadcast on March 26, 2014. The OST of the drama is sung by Sohail Haider and Dua Malik.

This drama was also aired on Indian channel Zee Zindagi from 27 January 2016 every Monday to Saturday 6:10pm (IST) under the same title. .

== Plot outline ==
Ishq Mein Teray is a story embraced in the bruises of life, where there is the sweetness of love and bitterness of relationships. The protagonist, Aiza, is a sensible and simple girl who is conducting her household responsibilities very well. The second important character is Sheheryar Hamdani, whose daughter Laiba is Aiza's friend. Laiba is in love with her cousin, Saad Hamdani, who is her father's business assistant. Aiza's intellect draws both Saad and Sheharyar towards her.

== Cast ==
- Mehwish Hayat as Aiza
- Azfar Rehman as Saad Hamdani
- Madiha Imam as Laiba
- Shaheen Khan as Saad's mother
- Shahzad Nawaz as Sheheryar Hamdani
- Shazia Naz as Cuckoo
