= Zoha Rahman =

British-Pakistani actress

- Born: Jhelum, Punjab, Pakistan
- Occupation: Actress‚ Model
- Years active: 2019 – present

Zoha Rahman is a British-Pakistani actress. She appeared in Spider-Man: Far From Home.

== Early life ==
Zoha was born in a small town near Jhelum, Punjab, Pakistan, and moved to the United Kingdom with her family when she was a child.

Whilst studying law at university, Zoha accepted various modelling and acting offers while studying, making her film debut in 2019 with Mr. Majnu.

Zoha currently divides her time between the UK and Pakistan, filming movie and television projects in both countries.

== Filmography ==
As well as appearing in Spider-Man: Far From Home (2019), Zoha has featured in Netflix's Young Wallander as Aaliya, Apple TV's Foundation as the Anacreon soldier Onelle, and has made her Bollywood debut in the cricket epic '83.

=== Film ===
| Year | Title | Role | Notes |
|---|---|---|---|
| 2019 | Mr. Majnu | | |
| 2019 | Spider-Man: Far From Home | Zoha Souliotis | |
| 2019 | Housefull 4 | | |
| 2020 | Man Sick Rogue | | |
| 2021 | Take-Awasian | | |
| 2021 | 83 (film) | | |
| TBA | Dirty Angels | TBA | |

=== Television ===
| Year | Title | Role | Notes |
|---|---|---|---|
| 2020 | Never Kiss Your Best Friend | Inayat | |
| 2020 | Young Wallander | Aaliya | |
| 2021 | Foundation | Onelle | Apple TV+ Series |
| 2021 | Dil-e-Momin | Ainee | Geo TV serial |

== Voice acting ==
Fluent in English, Hindi, Urdu and Punjabi, Zoha works as a voice actor, having lent her voice to multiple commercials in various accents, including for the Home Office. She also narrated Audible's audiobook 'The Arctic Curry Club' by Dani Redd.
