= Kahan Tum Chalay Gye =

2016 Pakistani TV serial

- Genre: Family drama Romantic drama
- Created by: Babar Javed and Asif Raza
- Written by: Khurram Kamran
- Directed by: Almasulain Khalid
- Country of origin: Pakistan
- Original language: Urdu
- No. of seasons: 01
- No. of episodes: 31

Production
- Producers: Babar Javed and Asif Raza
- Camera setup: Multi-camera setup
- Running time: 40-50 minutes

Original release
- Network: Geo Tv
- Release: 30 April – 18 September 2016

Kahan Tum Chalay Gaye (previously titled Meri Har Nazar Teri Muntazir) is a Pakistani drama serial that first aired on Geo Entertainment on 10 February 2016. It is produced by Babar Javed and Asif Raza. The series aired every Sunday 7pm, after being moved from the Wednesday and Thursday 10pm-11pm slot. The show went off air unfinished after 9-10 episodes (early March) due to censor issues but then resumed after 2 months, in May 2016, under a new change.

== Cast ==
- Saman Ansari
- Muhammad Ali
- Firdous Jamal
- Dania Enwer as Salma
- Parveen Akbar as Kausar
- Ali Hassan
- Farah Nadir as Bilal's mother
- Faisal Qazi
- Hira Shaikh
- Fariya Hassan as Shiza

== See also ==
- Geo TV
- List of Pakistani television series
- List of programs broadcast by Geo Entertainment
