= Mera Rab Waris =

Pakistani drama television series

- میرا رب وارث
- Written by: Jahanzeb Qamar
- Directed by: Asad Jabbal
- Starring: Danish Taimoor; Madiha Imam
- Country of origin: Pakistan
- Original language: Urdu
- No. of episodes: 37

Production
- Producers: Abdullah Kadwani; Asad Qureshi
- Production locations: Karachi, Sindh
- Camera setup: Multi-camera setup
- Production company: 7th Sky Entertainment

Original release
- Network: Geo Entertainment
- Release: 7 March – 26 September 2019

Related
- Baba Jani; Kahin Deep Jaley

Mera Rab Waris (Urdu: میرا رب وارث) was a Pakistani drama television series, written by Jahanzeb Qamar and produced by Abdullah Kadwani and Asad Qureshi under their banner 7th Sky Entertainment. The drama changed between airing weekly and then two episodes bi-weekly (60–90 minutes) on Geo Entertainment every Wednesday and Thursday, replacing Baba Jani and Qaid. It stars Danish Taimoor and Madiha Imam.

== Plot ==
This is the story of Ayesha, a young vibrant girl who has strong beliefs, a deep understanding of religion, and respect for a traditional and respectful lifestyle. When Haris, who belongs to a liberal household with a modern outlook, meets Ayesha accidentally, the unexpected spark between them leads to them getting married. Haris first does not want to marry her due to her pardah, but when he accidentally sees her face, he falls in love with her. His mother does not want him to marry her but finally agrees when Haris threatens to take his life.

The conflict between Ayesha whose faith is her guiding light, and her in-laws who are far more liberal in their approach, starts as soon as she moves in with them and slowly takes over her whole life.

Ayesha's marriage does not go down well with Faizan who has known Ayesha growing up, and has been in love with her since he was a teenager. However, for the sake of Aisha he tries to be happy. Aisha's sister-in-law falls in love with Faizan and marries him. Ayla, a classmate of Haris, is in love with him and tries to take her life when Haris refuses her. Ayla fools Aisha into thinking that Haris is having an affair with her by drugging him and sending him a picture of him sleeping on her couch. This does not go well with Aisha but the couple reconciles. Aisha finds out she is pregnant. She sees Mazhar with another girl in the mall, and Mazhar who was aware of Faizi's feelings towards her, tells on her. Aisha is forced to swear on the Quran that she does not love Faizi, but she does not as this would make her God angry. Haris kicks her out and is heartbroken. Aisha goes to her father's home and is upset. Haris realises the truth when Faizi tells him. Ayla's truth is also brought forward. Haris goes to Aisha so that she forgives him. They have a car accident and Ayesha has a miscarriage and falls into a coma. Haris is shocked to know that he has lost both his unborn child and Ayesha. He goes to a mazaar and prays. Ayesha wakes up and starts crying over the loss of her child. When Haris comforts her, they sit side-by-side which indicates a happy ending.

== Cast ==
- Danish Taimoor as Haris
- Madiha Imam as Aisha
- Ahsan Mohsin Ikram as Sami
- Hira Hussain as Kinzi
- Abid Ali as Zaheer (Haris' Father)
- Seemi Pasha as Durdana (Haris' Mother)
- Tanveer Jamal as Farhan (Aisha's Father)
- Fazila Qazi as Aisha's Mother
- Nida Mumtaz as Naheed (Faizi's Mother)
- Shameen Khan as Ayla
- Humaira Bano as Nadia's Mother
- Tipu Sharif as Mazhar
- Mirza Zain Baig as Faizi
- Arez Ahmed as Hashir
- Birjees Faruqui as Mazhar's mother.

== Soundtrack ==
Mera Rab Waris - OST

Soundtrack album by Sahir Ali Bagga
- Released: 3 March 2019
- Recorded: 2019
- Genre: Television soundtrack
- Length: (6:20)
- Language: Urdu
- Label: Geo TV

Music video
- "Mera Rab Waris " OST on YouTube

The title song was sung by Sahir Ali Bagga. The music was composed by Sahir Ali Bagga and the lyrics were written by Sahir Ali Bagga.

== Reception ==
The series received mixed reviews from critics. Roha Owais of Daily Times wrote: "It captivated the viewers by its strong story line".

The drama become a Blockbuster and maintained its position in Top 10 for 19 Consecutive Weeks From Episode 1 to Episode 19 and re-entered in Top 10 From Episode 21 and became the 2nd most Watched Show in Week 39 with the ratings of 12.6. The drama started with marvellous TRP ratings of 8.25 and ended with 15.5 TRP and 20.2 Peak ratings. The drama achieved highest ever Peak Ratings of 20.2 which was later broken by Mere Paas Tum Ho.
