= Heer (TV series) =

Pakistani television series

- ہیر
- Genre: Drama
- Written by: Mansoor Saeed; Zafar Elahi
- Directed by: Syed Ramish Rizvi
- Starring: Madiha Imam; Yasir Ali Khan; Asad Siddiqui; Seemi Pasha
- Country of origin: Pakistan
- Original language: Urdu
- No. of seasons: 1
- No. of episodes: 22

Production
- Producers: Asif Raza Mir; Babar Javed
- Production company: A&B Entertainment

Original release
- Network: Geo Entertainment
- Release: 25 January 2016 – 2016

Heer (Urdu: ہیر) is a 2016 Pakistani Urdu-language television drama serial directed by Syed Ramish Rizvi and written by Mansoor Saeed and Zafar Elahi. Produced by Asif Raza Mir and Babar Javed under their banner A&B Entertainment, the serial ran for 22 episodes on Geo Entertainment from its premiere on 25 January 2016.

The serial stars Madiha Imam in the title role as Heer, a young woman from a rural background who seeks to improve the economic prospects of women in her village, alongside Yasir Ali Khan and Asad Siddiqui.

== Plot ==
Heer (Madiha Imam) is an educated young woman from a small village with progressive views on women's autonomy. With support from Gaity Ara (Seemi Pasha), an NGO worker, she sets up a handicraft centre in the village to help local women earn an independent income. Her efforts meet with resistance from several of the village's men, who view the initiative as a challenge to the existing social order and organise opposition against her. Facing increasing hostility, Heer eventually leaves the village for the city, parting from her love interest Ibrahim (Asad Siddiqui), the Chaudhry's nephew. The later episodes follow her adjustment to urban life and the consequences of her departure on those she left behind.

== Cast ==
- Madiha Imam as Heer
- Yasir Ali Khan as Aabis
- Asad Siddiqui as Ibrahim
- Seemi Pasha as Aabis's mother
- Zaheen Tahira as Aabis's aunt
- Azra Mansoor as Aabis's grandmother
- Bigul Hussain
- Dania Enwer as Mehmaa
- Syed Saim Ali
- Majida Hameed
- Javed Jamal
- Aslam Sheikh as Chaudhry Sahab
- Seema Khan as Kulsoom
- Humaira Zahid
