= Bechari Qudsia =

Pakistani drama television series

- بیچاری قدسیہ
- Genre: Drama; Family; Soap opera
- Written by: Irfan Ahmed Shams
- Directed by: Irfan Aslam
- Starring: Fatima Effendi; Bilal Qureshi; Moomal Khalid
- Country of origin: Pakistan
- Original language: Urdu
- No. of seasons: 1
- No. of episodes: 70

Production
- Producer: Arif Lakhani
- Running time: 40 minutes approx.
- Production company: Electro Entertainment

Original release
- Network: Geo Entertainment
- Release: 19 July – 28 September 2021

Bechari Qudsia (Urdu: بیچاری قدسیہ, lit. 'Poor Qudsia') is a Pakistani family soap drama that premiered on 19 July 2021 on Geo Entertainment. Produced by Arif Lakhani under Electro Entertainment, it was written by Irfan Ahmed Shams, and directed by Irfan Aslam.

== Plot ==
Qudsia's parents challenge poverty and manage to get their daughter enrolled in a prestigious university despite working odd jobs. Her inferiority complex makes it difficult for her to adjust in her surrounding, which prompts her to fake a privileged lifestyle. Unfortunately, she attracts the richest students on campus, which angers Anaya as she cannot bear sharing her friends with anyone. Anaya gets possessive to the extent of hurting Qudsia's reputation when her own crush, Ibrahim, gets fond of the new girl.

Before Anaya could take her friendship with Ibrahim to the next level, he professes his love for Qudsia instead. Qudsia's life in the university get more complicated each day as Anaya is adamant to expose Qudsia's mediocre background to everyone who took Qudsia at her word. Ibrahim rushes to Qudsia's help every time Anaya puts Qudsia in a vulnerable situation. After all else fails, Anaya gets hold of some lifestyle videos Qudsia had made secretly in Ibrahim's house where she was working temporarily to compensate for her mother's sick leaves.

When her videos go viral on the internet, Qudsia faces many tragedies, including her father's death who couldn't bear the humiliation. Her videos also attract plenty of wandering eyes as well as haters—Ibrahim's sister being one of them. Qudsia's relatives also walk in to suffocate her with character assassination after another secret admirer from the internet starts sending her gifts and flowers. Hailing from a lower-middle-class background, Qudsia begins to face the hardship her father had protected her from in his lifetime.

== Cast ==
- Fatima Effendi as Qudsia (protagonist)
- Bilal Qureshi as Ibrahim (protagonist)
- Moomal Khalid as Anaya (antagonist)
- Laiba Khan as Anoushay; Ibrahim's younger sister
- Shabbir Jan as Rasheed; Qudsia's father (Dead)
- Kinza Malik as Hajra; Qudsia's mother (Dead)
- Daniyal Afzal Khan as Khalid; Qudsia's cousin
- Ali Rizvi as Ilyas; Qudsia's brother
- Mizna Waqas as Kishwar; Ilyas's wife
- Ayesha Gul as Rabia; Ibrahim's mother (Dead)
- Farhan Ally Agha as Iqbal; Ibrahim's father
- Kamran Jeelani as Anaya's father
- Fahima Awan as Naila
- Aliha Chaudry as Rida
- Shazia Qaiser as Kishwar's mother
- Yasir Alam as Ali; Anaya's cousin
- Beena Chaudhary as Nargis: Khalid's mother
- Asfand
- Qasim Khan
