= Zamani Manzil Kay Maskharay =

Pakistani television show

- Genre: Comedy drama
- Written by: Faysal Manzoor and Maahir Kamal
- Directed by: Raja Shahid
- Starring: Parveen Akbar; Asim Mehmood; Dania Enwer
- Country of origin: Pakistan
- Original language: Urdu
- No. of episodes: 100

Production
- Producer: Naughty Forty Productions
- Production location: Pakistan
- Running time: Approx 40 Minutes

Original release
- Network: Geo Entertainment; Geo Kahani
- Release: 3 November 2017 – 2018

Zamani Manzil Kay Maskharay (lit. "The Clowns of Zamani Manzil") is a 2017 Pakistani drama serial, starring Parveen Akbar, Asim Mehmood and Dania Enwer in lead roles. The drama was first aired on 3 November on Geo Entertainment, where it aired biweekly. The series went off air due to bad ratings after 37 episodes. It then started airing on Geo Khani at the end of 2018 from the first episode Monday to Friday 7:30 pm, until it completed 100 episodes, ending the series.

== Plot ==
Zamani Begum is an elderly woman about to die, with her offspring competing to inherit her property. In that struggle, everyone belonging to the family plays mind games.

== Cast ==
- Parveen Akbar As Zaman Begum
- Nadia Afgan As Mehrunisa (Zamani Daughter)
- Rashid Farooqui As Saleem (Mehrunisa Husband)
- Asim Mehmood As Mehboob (Mehrunisa Son)
- Dania Enwer As Chandni (Taufeeq Daughter)
- Nauman Masood As Rafaqat (Zamani Bhatija)
- Gul-e-Rana As Khushnoodaara (Rafaqat Sister)
- Faisal Qazi As Taufeeq (Zamani Son)
- Nazli Nasr As Ismataara (Taufeeq Wife)
- Rehma Saleem Khan As Shermila (Khushnoodaara Daughter)
- Nargis Rasheed As Shabbiran (Zamani Cousin)
- Naveed Raza As Bashira (Shabbiran Son)
- Sana Askari As Pinno (Shabbiran Daughter)
- Rabya Kulsoom

== Prequel ==
=== Telefilm ===
Before the drama serial, a television film was also broadcast under the same title on Eid-ul-Azha in 2017, which was loosely based upon the love story of Mehboob (Asim Mehmood) and Chandni (Hina Altaf) and is encircled by jealousy, rivalry and a constant tug of war inbetween their mothers. Zamani Begum helps to reunite the couple. It was directed by Shahood Alvi and written by Faysal Manzoor. The cast was the same as the serial except for Hina Altaf who played the role of Chandni and was replaced by Dania Anwar in the serial.
