= Muqaddar (TV series) =

2020 Pakistani television series on Geo TV

- Title Screen
- مُقدر
- Genre: Romance; Drama; Thriller
- Written by: Iqbal Bano
- Directed by: Shehrazade Sheikh
- Starring: Faysal Qureshi; Madiha Imam; Ayesha Gul; Haroon Shahid; Ali Ansari; Shameen Khan; Fazila Kaiser; Haris Waheed; Sabeena Syed; Saife Hassan
- Opening theme: "Dard Kay Mausam" by Sehar Gul
- Country of origin: Pakistan
- Original language: Urdu
- No. of episodes: 38

Production
- Producers: Abdullah Kadwani; Asad Qureshi
- Production locations: Karachi, Sindh
- Camera setup: Multi-camera setup
- Running time: 35-45 minutes
- Production company: 7th Sky Entertainment

Original release
- Network: Geo Entertainment
- Release: 17 February – 2 November 2020

Muqaddar (Urdu: مُقدر, lit. 'Destiny') is a 2020 Pakistani television series directed by Shehrazade Sheikh. It premiered on Geo Entertainment on 17 February 2020. It is produced by Abdullah Kadwani and Asad Qureshi under their banner 7th Sky Entertainment. It features Faysal Qureshi and Madiha Imam in their third project together. The supporting cast includes Ayesha Gul, Ali Ansari, Haroon Shahid, Shameen Khan, Fazila Kaiser and Saif-e-Hassan.

It is digitally available to stream on YouTube and in some countries on VIU App.

== Plot ==
Raima (Madiha Imam) is RJ who wants to make a name for herself. At work she gets the opportunity to interview her colleague Saad (Haroon Shahid)'s influential businessman uncle, Saif (Faysal Qureshi). Saif falls in love with her and then using his influence and power forces Raima into marrying him.

Raima receives constant animosity from Saif’s household and no support from her own family. Then follows Raima's challenges to escape the atrocities inflicted by Saif and his family. Who will help her and give support in her struggle?

== Cast ==
=== Main characters ===
- Faysal Qureshi as Sardar Saif Ur Rehman (Dead in episode 35 or 36)
- Madiha Imam as Raima Saif nee Alvi
- Ayesha Gul as Farkhanda Begum
- Ali Ansari as Haris Alvi
- Haroon Shahid as Saad Ur Rehman

=== Recurring Characters ===
- Shameen Khan as Maham
- Fazila Kaiser as Bilquis, Haris's mother (Dead)
- Saif-e-Hassan as Haris's father
- Sabeena Farooq as Abeera
- Haris Waheed as Hassan Sherazi
- Sabeena Syed as Zara
- Ellie Zaidi as Sehar
- Aadi Khan as Zargham
- Nida Hussain as Hamna
- Annie Zaidi as Maimuna
- Nabeela Khan as Salma, Zara's mother
- Birjees Farooqui as Roshan, Maham's Mother
- Shahzad Mukhtar as Zafar, Maham's Father
- Shazia Qaiser as Sadaf's mother
- Salma Qadir as Shehnaz

== Production ==
On 14 November 2019, Qureshi revealed through Instagram about his upcoming project. In December 2019, it was reported that Imam will be paired opposite Qureshi in lead. The first teaser was released on 20 March 2020. It is the third project featuring Qureshi and Imam together after Zakham (2016) and Baba Jani (2018).

== Soundtrack ==
Muqaddar

Soundtrack album by Sahir Ali Bagga and Sehar Gul
- Released: 15 February 2020
- Recorded: 2020
- Genre: Television soundtrack
- Length: 1:56
- Language: Urdu
- Label: Geo Entertainment

Music video
- "OST: Muqaddar" on YouTube

The OST is sung and composed by Sahir Ali Bagga and Sehar Gul on lyrics of Asim Raza.

== Awards and nominations ==
Date of ceremony	Award	Category	Recipients	Result	Ref.
October 9, 2021	Lux Style Awards	Best Male Actor - Critics	Faysal Quraishi	Nominated	
October 9, 2021	Lux Style Awards	Best Male Actor - Viewer’s Choice	Faysal Quraishi	Nominated	
November 5, 2021	Pakistan International Screen Awards	Best Television Actress (Jury)	Madiha Imam	Nominated	
November 5, 2021	Pakistan International Screen Awards	Best Television Actor (Jury)	Faysal Quraishi	Nominated	
