= Arisha Razi =

Pakistani actress

Arisha Razi Khan
- عریشہ رازی
- Born: Karachi, Sindh, Pakistan
- Education: A Levels
- Alma mater: Dawood Public School
- Occupation: Actress
- Years active: 2005–present

Arisha Razi Khan (Urdu: عریشہ رٖضی خان) is a Pakistani actress and television host in the Urdu television industry. She started her career by acting in commercials ads; she did her first commercial at the age of three and a half years. She launched her own Karachi-based clothing brand itsforu, along with her elder sister, Sara Razi Khan. She became a popular child artist acting in the comedy show Hum Sab Umeed Sai Hain. She is best known for her performance in several commercially successful television series, including Omer Dadi Aur Gharwale, Mastana Mahi, Kitni Girhain Baaki Hain, Aastana, Sannata, Na Kaho Tum Mere Nahi, Tanhai, Malika-e-Aliya, Abro, Sadqay Tumhare, Baba Jani

== Career ==
She started to work in the dramas Mastana Mahi, Na Kaho Tum Mere Nahi, Omer Dadi Aur Gharwale. She hosted a segment in the popular comedy show Hum Sub Umeed Sai Hain. Later she also co-hosted Wah Wah SubhanAllah, a na`at competition for children. She appeared in Tanhai along with Goher Mumtaz, Ayesha Omar, Azfar Rehman and Saba Hameed. Tanhai was aired on Hum TV.

== Television ==
Year	Serial	Role	Channel	Notes	Reference
2010–2011	Main Abdul Qadir Hoon		Hum TV		
2011	Mastana Mahi	Suhaai	Hum TV		
2012–13	Mera Pehla Pyar	Hira	ARY Digital		
2013	Tanhai	Sabeen	Hum TV		
2014	Malika-e-Aliya	Rida	Geo Entertainment		
2014-15	Sadqay Tumhare	Kawser	Hum TV		
2015	Abro (serial)	Aima	Hum TV		
2016–17	Kitni Girhain Baaki Hain (season 2)	Bibi	Hum TV	Episode 27	
2017	Laut Ke Chalay Aana	Ayesha	Geo Entertainment		
2017–18	Parchayee	Sania	Hum TV		
2018-2019	Baba Jani	Aleena	Geo Entertainment		
2017-18	Malkin	Neha	Geo Entertainment		
2019	Chand Ki Pariyan	Mona	Geo Entertainment		
2019	Kam Zarf	Young Aima (Cameo Appearance)			
2019	Gul-e-Rana Ki Bhawajain	Hania	ARY Digital	Telefilm	
2020	Raaz-e-Ulfat	Amber	Geo Entertainment		
2021	Chupke Chupke	Jannat	Hum TV		
2021	Chauraha	Naila	Geo Entertainment	Serial	

== Films ==
Year	Title	Role	Director
2016	3 Bahadur: The Revenge of Baba Balaam	Amna (voice)	Sharmeen Obaid Chinoy
2018	3 Bahadur: Rise of the Warriors	Amna (voice)	Sharmeen Obaid Chinoy
2019	Sacch	Shakira	Zulfiqar Sheikh
