= Madiha Imam =

Pakistani actress, model and video jockey

Syeda Madiha Imam
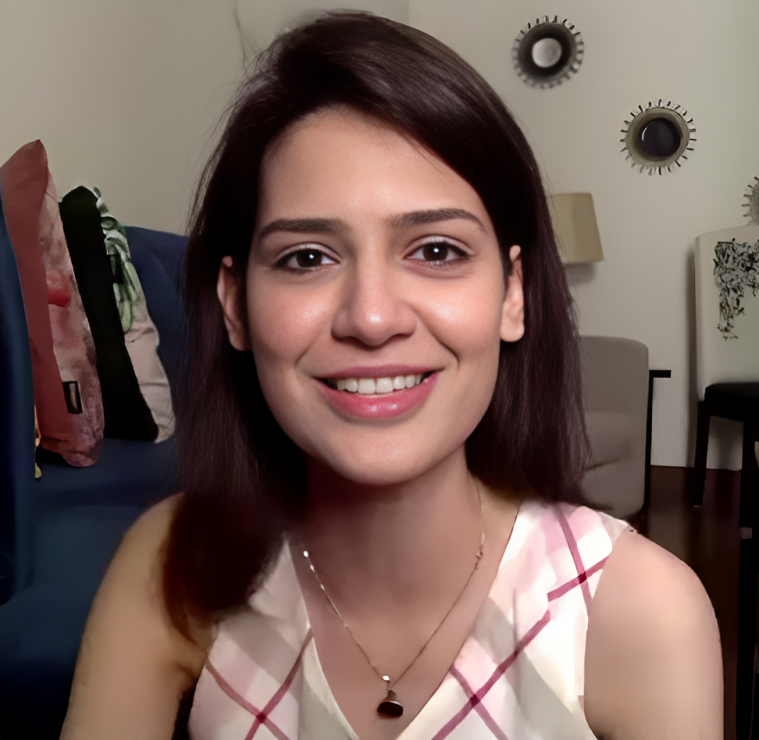
- Madiha Imam in 2020
- Born: Syeda Madiha Imam; 8 February 1991 (age 35); Karachi, Pakistan
- Education: Harvard Business School
- Occupations: VJ; Host; Actress; Director
- Years active: 2011–present
- Spouse: Moji Basar (m. 2023)

Syeda Madiha Imam (Urdu: مدیحہ امام) is a Pakistani VJ-turned-actress and television host. She is known for her roles in the drama series Heer (2015) and Dhaani (2016).

== Career ==
Her television debut was in the Hum TV drama Ishq Mein Teray (2013) opposite Mehwish Hayat and Azfar Rehman, where she played the supporting role of Laiba. Subsequently, she became known for her leading roles in Heer (2015), Dhaani (2016), Saanp Seerhi (2017), Zoya Swaleha (2017) and Zakham (2017).

She made her film debut with Dear Maya in 2017 opposite Manisha Koirala.

In 2018, she appeared in Faiza Iftikhar's Baba Jani, which aired on Geo Entertainment. She appeared in the hit Pakistani series Dushmaan-e-Jaan (2020) on ARY Digital. She played Raima in the drama serial Muqaddar with Faysal Quraishi in her third serial with him (the first two being Zakham & Baba Jani) and the hit web series Ek Jhoothi Love Story (2020) with Bilal Abbas. She acted in the 2021 series Mujhay Vida Kar on ARY Digital, opposite Muneeb Butt and Raza Taalish alongside Saboor Aly, where she played Rida. She appeared in the hit Pakistani series Ishq Jalebi (2021) on Geo Entertainment with Wahaj Ali. She also appeared in Dil-e-Momin opposite Faysal Quraishi, which also aired on Geo Entertainment.

In 2022, she paired opposite Mikaal Zulfiqar in Chauraha for Geo Entertainment.

== Personal life ==
On 4 May 2023, she married Moji Basar, an entrepreneur and filmmaker from Arunachal Pradesh, India.

== Filmography ==
=== Films ===
Key
†	Denotes films that are not released

Year	Title	Role	Notes
2017	Dear Maya	Anna	Bollywood film
2022	Aik To Tum Aurtain	Zeba	Short Pakistani film
2025	Aaina	Directorial Debut	Single TV Play
2025	Neelofar	Sara	Pakistani film

=== Television ===
Year	Title	Role	Notes	Ref(s)	Network
2013	Khalish	Noori			Hum TV
2013–2014	Ishq Mein Teray	Laiba			Hum TV
2015	Heer	Heer			Geo Entertainment
2016–2017	Dhaani	Dhaani			Geo Entertainment
2017	Zoya Sawleha	Zoya			Geo Entertainment
2017	Zakham	Takbeer			ARY Digital
2018	Woh Mera Dil Tha	Naina			ARY Digital
2018–2019	Baba Jani	Nimra			Geo Entertainment
2019	Mera Rab Waris	Aisha			Geo Entertainment
2020	Muqaddar	Raima			Geo Entertainment
2020	Dushmaan-E-Jaan	Rubab			ARY Digital
2021	Safar Tamam Howa	Anoushey			Hum TV
2021	Ishq Jalebi	Bela			Geo Entertainment
2021	Mujhay Vida Kar	Rida			ARY Digital
2021-2022	Dil-e-Momin	Maya			Geo Entertainment
2022	Chauraha	Zoya			Geo Entertainment
2023	Mujhe Qabool Nahi	Mahira			Geo Entertainment
2024	Beyhadh	Sonia			Geo Entertainment
2024	Dil Manay Na	Hania			Green Entertainment
2024	Yahya	Mili			Geo Entertainment
2025	Behroopia	Zara			Green Entertainment
2026	Mohabat Mukhtasir	Mirha			Hum TV

=== As host ===
Year	Title	Role	Ref(s)
2011	MTV Select	Host	
2012	Weekend with Madiha	Host	
2016	Made in Pakistan	Host	

=== Telefilms ===
Year	Title	Role	Notes	Ref(s)
2015	Nazar Kay Samney	Asma	Telefilm	
2017	Salma Ka Balma	Salma	Telefilm	
2018	Hum Chale Aaye	Sila	Telefilm	
2020	Dikhawa	Herself	Episode: "Khotay Rishtay"	
2022	Full Fry	Mahi	Telefilm	

=== Web ===
Year	Title	Role	Notes	Ref(s)
2020	Ek Jhoothi Love Story	Salma	Web Series	
