= Makafaat (TV series) =

- Title screen
- مکافات
- Genre: Anthology; Family drama; Social drama
- Created by: Abdullah Kadwani; Asad Qureshi
- Developed by: Abdullah Kadwani; Asad Qureshi
- Written by: List: Sameena Ejaz Mehrunnisa.M.Khan Ghazala Naqvi Huma Hina Nafees Saqlain Abbas Wajiha Warsi Rehan Zaheer Siddiqui Anwar Gilani Umar Qazi Ramia Salma Farzana Imran
- Directed by: Saleem Ghanchi; Mohsin Mirza
- Starring: Various Artists
- Theme music composer: Sahir Ali Bagga
- Country of origin: Pakistan
- No. of seasons: 4
- No. of episodes: 142 (list of episodes)

Production
- Camera setup: Multi-camera setup
- Production company: 7th Sky Entertainment

Original release
- Network: Geo Entertainment
- Release: 30 September 2019 – 1 May 2022

Related
- Dikhawa

Makafaat (Urdu: مکافات, lit. 'Result of Deed') is a Pakistani anthology drama series that aired on Geo TV and was created by Abdullah Kadwani and Asad Qureshi. It premiered on 28 September 2019. Each episode featured a different short story focusing on social issues.

== Synopsis ==
The anthology follows different stories and characters depicting the theme of Karma and Huqooq-ul-Ibaad. The Drama series tells stories of fate’s connection with our deeds, showing how people are often held accountable for their willful actions even before the afterlife and reflects on negative virtues such as greed, envy, heedlessness, pride, malice, covetousness, and hatred in its standalone episodes.

== Episodes ==
=== Series overview ===
Series	Episodes		Originally released	
Series	Episodes		First released	Last released
1	33		30 September 2019	28 October 2019
2	39	31	25 April 2020	2 June 2020
2	39	08	6 August 2020	17 August 2020
3	39	31	12 April 2021	12 May 2021
3	39	08	28 June 2021	18 July 2021
4	31		25 March 2022	1 May 2022

=== Season 1 ===
No. in series	No. in season	Title	Main Cast	Original air date
1	1	Guriya; lit: Doll	Arisha Razi, Seemi Pasha, Ali Ansari, Daniyal Afzal Khan	30 September 2019
2	2	Badniyati; lit: Dishonest	Syed Jibran, Shameen Khan, Qurat-ul-Ain, Humaira Zahid	30 September 2019
3	3	Meri Pasand; lit: My Favorite	Laila Wasti, Ali Ansari, Shameen Khan, Fazila Qazi, Taqi Ahmed	1 October 2019
4	4	Kahani; lit: Story	Abid Ali, Rabia Noreen, Sohail Sameer, Ayesha Gul, Ahmed Usman	2 October 2019
5	5	Qeemat; lit: Value	Kamran Jilani, Beenish Chohan, Anas Yasin, Ahmed Usman, Fahad	3 October 2019
6	6	Enayat; lit: Benefaction	Maham Amir, Shahood Alvi, Birjees Farooqui	4 October 2019
7	7	Sawaal; lit: Question	Abid Ali, Farah Nadir, Haris Waheed, Agha Mustafa Hassan, Mehboob Sultan	7 October 2019
8	8	Wapsi; lit: Return	Sohail Asghar, Parveen Akbar, Agha Mustafa Hassan, Raeed	8 October 2019
9	9	Pachtawa; lit: Regret	Saife Hassan, Seemi Pasha, Arisha Razi, Shehzad Mukhtar, Saba Khan	8 October 2019
10	10	Ghuroor; lit: Pride	Saba Hameed, Sohail Sameer, Beenish Chohan, Ali Ansari	9 October 2019
11	11	Bhook; lit: Hunger	Rashid Farooqui, Nazli Nasr, Ali Rizvi	9 October 2019
12	12	Faisla; lit: Decision	Maham Amir, Saba Hameed, Manzoor Qureshi, Asim Mehmood, Humaira Zahid, Shehzad Mukhtar	10 October 2019
13	13	Khidmat; lit: Serve	Ali Ansari, Syed Fazal Hasnain, Salma Hassan, Farah Nadir, Ali Rizvi	10 October 2019
14	14	Naik Seerat; lit: Good character	Syed Jibran, Maira Khan, Nida Mumtaz	11 October 2019
15	15	Batwara; lit: Appropriation	Erum Akhtar, Mizna Waqas, Saba Faisal, Saife Hassan, Saba Hameed, Kamran Jeelani	11 October 2019
16	16	Laalchi; lit: Greedy	Farhan Ally Agha, Erum Akhtar, Faiza Gilani, Humaira Bano, Manzoor Qureshi, Malik Raza	14 October 2019
17	17	Dua; lit: Prayer	Zuhab Khan, Rashid Farooqui, Saba Faisal, Owais Shaikh	14 October 2019
18	18	Inaam; lit: Reward	Maira Khan, Sohail Sameer, Amir Qureshi, Naeem Malik, Fahad Sherwani	15 October 2019
19	19	Hadsa; lit: Accident	Hammad Farooqui, Maryam Nafees, Madiha Rizvi, Parveen Akbar, Hassan Nauman	15 October 2019
20	20	Zevar; lit: Jewelry	Anum Fayyaz, Babar Khan, Mizna Waqas	16 October 2019
21	21	Rehmat; lit: Mercy	Afshan Qureshi, Qurat ul Ain, Madiha Rizvi, Syed Jibran, Amir Qureshi, Laiba Khan	16 October 2019
22	22	Azmaish; lit: Trial	Nida Mumtaz, Ali Rizvi, Raeed Alam, Maryam Nafees, Omi Butt	17 October 2019
23	23	Deen Aur Duniya; lit: Religion and World	Laila Wasti, Erum Akhtar, Asim Mehmood, Laiba Khan, Omi Butt, Sami Khan (child star)	17 October 2019
24	24	Anjaam; lit: Consequence	Mehmood Akhtar, Nida Mumtaz, Arsalan Raja	18 October 2019
25	25	Qarz; lit: Loan	Maham Aamir, Kamran Jilani, Tipu Sharif, Syed Fazal Hussain, Imran Rizvi, Owais Shaikh	18 October 2019
26	26	Maseeha; lit: Panecea	Saba Faisal, Ali Ansari, Khalid Anum, Laila Wasti, Imran Rizvi	21 October 2019
27	27	Izzat; lit: Respect	Kamran Jilani, Madiha Rizvi, Zohreh Ali, Fahima Aawan, Umair Laghari	21 October 2019
28	28	Takabbur; lit: Pride	Madiha Rizvi, Umair Laghari, Mizna Waqas, Anas Yasin, Shazia Qaiser, Faiza Gillani	22 October 2019
29	29	Jaisi Karni Wesi Bharni; lit: What you sow you shall reap	Humaira Bano, Farhan Ally Agha, Imran Aslam, Babar Khan, Jinaan Hussain, Shehzad Mukhtar	22 October 2019
30	30	Nidamat; lit: Repentance	Nazish Jahangir, Asma Abbas, Malik Raza, Salma Qadir	23 October 2019
31	31	Nasha; lit: Addiction	Sohail Asghar, Parveen Akbar, Zuhab Khan, Beena Chaudhry, Owais Shaikh, Sami Khan (child star)	23 October 2019
32	32	Shareek-e-hayat; lit: Life Partner	Kamran Jilani, Adla Khan, Qirat ul Ain, Saleem Ghanchi, Ahmed Usman	25 October 2019
33	33	Naseebo	Parveen Akbar, Sajida Syed, Maryam Noor, Jinaan Hussain, Tariq Jameel, Ellie Zaid	28 October 2019

=== Season 2 ===
No. in series	No. in season	Title	Main Cast	Written By	Directed By	Original air date
34	1	Ba Adab Ba Naseeb	Syed Jibran, Manzoor Qureshi, Beenish Chohan, Anam Tanveer, Anas Ali Imran	Wajiha Warsi	Saleem Ghanchi	25 April 2020
35	2	Easer	Seemi Pasha, Shameen Khan, Beena Chaudhary, Ali Ansari, Namrah Shahid, Mehmood Akhtar	Huma Hina Nafees	Saleem Ghanchi	26 April 2020
36	3	Ehsaas	Asim Mehmood, Maham Amir, Madiha Rizvi, Parveen Akbar, Umair Leghari	Shabnam Sani	Saleem Ghanchi	27 April 2020
37	4	Nadamat	Ali Ansari, Shameen Khan, Asim Mehmood, Shazia Qaiser	Huma Hina Nafees	Saleem Ghanchi	28 April 2020
38	5	Mera Libas Hu Tum	Saima Qureshi, Babar Khan, Zainab Shabbir, Birjees Farooqi	Huma Hina Nafees	Saleem Ghanchi	29 April 2020
39	6	Doulat Ka Ghamand	Mehmood Akhtar, Nazish Jahangir, Beena Chaudhry, Saba Faisal, Zohreh Ali	Imran Ibrahim	Saleem Ghanchi	30 April 2020
40	7	Pachtawa	Saba Faisal, Nida Mumtaz, Srha Asghar, Ali Rizvi, Sajida Syed, Zohreh Ali, Fahad Sherwani	Huma Hina Nafees	Saleem Ghanchi	1 May 2020
41	8	Bad Dua	Maham Amir, Kamran Jilani, Sajida Syed, Faisal Naqvi, Uzair Abbasi, Urooj Abbas, Falak Shehzad, Khushi Maheen	Wajiha Warsi	Saleem Ghanchi	2 May 2020
42	9	Cousins	Namrah Shahid, Adla Khan, Haris Waheed, Saife Hassan, Saima Qureshi, Birjees Farooqi	Huma Hina Nafees	Saleem Ghanchi	3 May 2020
43	10	Sarkashi	Maham Amir, Babar Khan, Syed Jibran, Seemi Pasha	Saqlain Abbas	Saleem Ghanchi	4 May 2020
44	11	Pani Pani	Fatima Effendi, Omar Shahzad, Rubina Ashraf, Seemi Pasha	Farzana Imran	Saleem Ghanchi	5 May 2020
45	12	Shak	Rashid Farooqui, Gul-e-Rana, Ayesha Gul, Ali Rizvi, Mizna Waqas, Laiba Khan, Khushi Maheen	Anwar Gilani	Saleem Ghanchi	6 May 2020
46	13	Nashukri	Javeria Abbasi, Kamran Jilani, Sami Khan	Samina Ejaz	Saleem Ghanchi	7 May 2020
47	14	Utran	Namrah Shahid, Adla Khan, Asim Mehmood, Beena Chaudhry, Umair Leghari, Kanwal Khan	Sidra Sehar Imran	Saleem Ghanchi	8 May 2020
48	15	Bakhil	Kamran Jilani, Qurat ul Ain, Srha Asghar, Raeed Alam, Agha Talal, Anas Yasin	Wajiha Warsi	Saleem Ghanchi	9 May 2020
49	16	Jannat	Syed Jibran, Sajida Syed, Afifa Jibran, Seemi Pasha	Mehrunnisa Mustaqeem Khan	Saleem Ghanchi	10 May 2020
50	17	Zindagi Anmol Hai	Fazila Qazi, Humaira Bano, Sohail Sameer, Farhan Ally Agha, Arisha Razi, Khushi Maheen, Falak Shehzad	Amber Azhar	Saleem Ghanchi	11 May 2020
51	18	Amanat	Shahood Alvi, Saima Qureshi, Raeed Alam, Tasneem Ansari, Zohreh Amir	Wajih Warsi	Saleem Ghanchi	12 May 2020
52	19	Bojh	Uroosa Siddiqui, Ali Abbas, Asma Abbas, Fahima Awan	Anwar Gilani	Saleem Ghanchi	13 May 2020
53	20	Silai Machine	Syed Jibran, Nida Mumtaz, Fatima Effendi	Mehrunnisa Mustaqeem Khan	Saleem Ghanchi	14 May 2020
54	21	Khoj	Rashid Farooqui, Javeria Abbasi, Laila Wasti, Adla Khan, Asim Mehmood, Arisha Razi	Samina Ejaz	Saleem Ghanchi	15 May 2020
55	22	Yaqeen-e-Kamil	Zainab Qayyum, Sohail Sameer, Noman Habib, Farah Nadir, Sara Kashif Rajput	Suraj Baba	Saleem Ghanchi	16 May 2020
56	23	Sazish	Nida Mumtaz, Fatima Effendi, Haris Waheed, Shameen Khan, Beena Chaudhry	Samina Ejaz	Saleem Ghanchi	17 May 2020
57	24	Behkawa	Hina Altaf, Sukaina Khan, Hammad Farooqui, Humaira Bano	Anwar Gilani	Saleem Ghanchi	18 May 2020
58	25	Pyaari Phuppo	Anzela Abbasi, Uroosa Siddiqui, Zainab Qayyum, Syed Arez, Kamran Jilani, Farhan Ally Agha, Annie Zaidi, Akbar Islam	Musharraf Raza	Saleem Ghanchi	19 May 2020
59	26	Inteqaam	Saba Faisal, Adla Khan, Hammad Farooqui	Abida Ahmed	Saleem Ghanchi	20 May 2020
60	27	Socha Tha Kiya	Shabbir Jan, Zainab Qayyum, Raeed, Kanwal Khan, Rushna, Ali Rizvi, Akber Islam	Nuzhat Saman	Saleem Ghanchi	21 May 2020
61	28	Kirayedaar	Saleem Mairaj, Sadaf Aashan, Zohab, Fazila Qazi, Laiba, Anumta Qureshi, Fahad Sherwani	Musharraf Raza	Saleem Ghanchi	22 May 2020
62	29	Soutelapan	Farhan Ally Agha, Nida Mumtaz, Adla Khan, Haris Waheed, Mizna Waqas	Anila Syed	Saleem Ghanchi	23 May 2020
63	30	Pakar	Saba Faisal, Namrah Shahid, Seemi Pasha	Aamra Shahid	Saleem Ghanchi	1 June 2020
64	31	Pyaari Bhabhi	Saba Faisal, Maham Amir, Umair Leghari, Salman Faisal, Nausheen Ibrahim, Aadi Khan	Amber Azhar	Ali Akbar	2 June 2020
65	32	Makan Malik	Adla Khan, Hammad Farooqi, Rabia Noreen	Musharraf Raza	Saleem Ghanchi	6 August 2020
66	33	Choti Ungli	Shabir Jan, Rashid Farooqui, Nida Mumtaz, Fahad Sherwani	Rehan Zaheer Siddiqui	Saleem Ghanchi	7 August 2020
67	34	Zakheera	Farhan Ally Agha, Maham Amir	Suraj Baba	Saleem Ghanchi	10 August 2020
68	35	Tawakkal	Babar Khan, Rabia Noreen	Huma Hina Nafees	Saleem Ghanchi	11 August 2020
69	36	Kafeel	Kamran Jilani, Fazila Qazi, Rashid Farooqui	Nadia Ahmed	Saleem Ghanchi	12 August 2020
70	37	Rizq Zaya Karna	Hassan Niazi, Asim Mehmood, Maham Amir, Namrah Shahid	Huma Hina Nafees	Saleem Ghanchi	13 August 2020
71	38	Ehsaan	Noor Ul Hassan, Nida Mumtaz, Adla Khan, Aadi Khan	Nadia Ahmed	Saleem Ghanchi	14 August 2020
72	39	Baydharak	Fazila Qazi, Noshaba Javed, Rashid Farooqui, Arisha Razi, Zohreh Ali	Farzana Imran	Saleem Ghanchi	17 August 2020

=== Season 3 ===
No. in series	No. in season	Title	Main Cast	Written By	Directed By	Original air date
73	1	Aaina	Junaid Khan, Ushna Shah, Iffat Rahim	Aamra Shahid	Mohsin Mirza	12 April 2021
74	2	Ji Huzoor	Zainab Shabbir, Arez Ahmed, Iffat Rahim, Hina Dilpazeer, Sofia Khan, Sidra Niazi, Hira Sheikh	Aamra Shahid	Mohsin Mirza	13 April 2021
75	3	Haq	Syed Jibran, Fatima Effendi, Adla Khan, Beena Chaudhry	Huma Hina Nafees	Saleem Ghanchi	14 April 2021
76	4	Khayanat	Haroon Shahid, Maham Amir, Asma Saif, Jamshed Khan, Sobia	Ambar Azhar	Saleem Ghanchi	15 April 2021
77	5	Kamtar	Rushna Khanzada, Mohsin Abbas Haider, Beena Chaudhary, Seemi Pasha, Asim Mehmood, Shameen Khan	Huma Hina Nafees	Saleem Ghanchi	16 April 2021
78	6	Khalish	Hammad Farooqui, Sukainah Khan, Shaheen Khan, Shameen Khan, Shazia Qaiser, Sobia	Saima Lateef	Saleem Ghanchi	17 April 2021
79	7	Bhabhi Maa	Raeed Alam, Aruba Mirza, Mohsin Abbas Haider, Manzoor Qureshi	Aamra Shahid	Saleem Ghanchi	18 April 2021
80	8	Ghaflat	Farhan Aly Agha, Humaira Bano, Abdul Rehman, Hareem Sohail, Sajida Syed, Owais Sheikh, Hamza	Huma Hina Nafees	Saleem Ghanchi	19 April 2021
81	9	Usool Aur Sachai	Agha Ali, Yashma Gill, Asma Saif, Manzoor Qureshi, Falak, Angle, Arsh	Huma Hina Nafees	Saleem Ghanchi	20 April 2021
82	10	Ikhlas	Hammad Farooqui, Namrah Shahid, Kamran Jilani, Mahrukh, Urooj Abbas, Anees Alam	Huma Hina Nafees	Saleem Ghanchi	21 April 2021
83	11	Phool	Kamran Jilani, Zainab Qayyum, Sami Khan, Khushi	Rehan Zaheer Siddiqui	Saleem Ghanchi	22 April 2021
84	12	Sohbat	Nawal Saeed, Hammad Farooqui, Asim Mehmood, Saqib Sameer, Afzal, S.M Ali	Rehan Zaheer Siddiqui	Saleem Ghanchi	23 April 2021
85	13	Masiha Bana Qatil	Syed Jibran, Maria Wasti, Hammad Farooqui, Asma Saif, Mannan Handed, Falak, Khushi, Urooj Ali, Ahmed Bashir, Afshan Zafar	Huma Hina Nafees	Saleem Ghanchi	24 April 2021
86	14	Jabar	Babar Khan, Adla Khan, Jinaan Hussain, Mehmood Aslam, Shaheen Khan, Humaira Bano	Huma Hina Nafees	Saleem Ghanchi	25 April 2021
87	15	Ghussa Haraam Hai	Hammad Farooqui, Fatima Effendi, Fahima Awan	Huma Hina Nafees	Saleem Ghanchi	26 April 2021
88	16	Malal	Raeed Alam, Haris Waheed, Seemi Pasha, Jinaan Hussain, Ali Rizvi	Nadia Ahmed	Saleem Ghanchi	27 April 2021
89	17	Darr	Babar Khan, Nazish Jahangir, Saba Hameed	Huma Hina Nafees	Saleem Ghanchi	28 April 2021
90	18	Saza	Furqan Qureshi, Srha Asghar, Shazia Qaiser, Beena Chaudhary, Zara Ahmed	Samina Ejaz	Saleem Ghanchi, Ali Akbar	29 April 2021
91	19	Marham	Haroon Shahid, Adla Khan, Saba Hameed, Madiha Rizvi, Talat Shah, Ayan Ahmed	Suraj Baba	Saleem Ghanchi	30 April 2021
92	20	Gila Kiya Karein	Babar Khan, Shameen Khan, Sukaina Khan, Saifee Hasan, Humaira Bano	Mansoor Saeed	Saleem Ghanchi	1 May 2021
93	21	Kameti Wali Khala	Raeed Alam, Mizna Waqas, Arisha Razi, Shaheen Khan, Beena Chaudhary, Madiha Rizvi	Musharaf Saeed	Saleem Ghanchi	2 May 2021
94	22	Aablay	Haroon Shahid, Syed Jibran, Sukaina Khan, Zohreh Amir, Beena Chaudhary, Shazia Qaiser, Seemi Pasha	Nadia Ahmed	Saleem Ghanchi	3 May 2021
95	23	Aulaad	Sidra Niazi, Haris Waheed, Sumaiya Buksh, Ayesha Gul	Huma Hina Nafees	Saleem Ghanchi	4 May 2021
96	24	Chalan	Haris Waheed, Taqi Ahmed, Zohreh Amir, Sajida Syed, Urooj Abbas, Hina Shaikh	Huma Hina Nafees	Saleem Ghanchi	5 May 2021
97	25	Mann Pasand	Syed Jibran, Sidra Niazi, Sumaiya Buksh, Saifee Hasan, Saba Faisal, Afshan Zafar	Suraj Baba	Saleem Ghanchi	6 May 2021
98	26	Maal e Ghanemat	Omer Shahzad, Fatima Effendi, Raeed Alam, Humaira Bano	Rehan Zaheer Siddiqui	Saleem Ghanchi	7 May 2021
99	27	Kar Bhala Hu Bhala	Zohreh Amir, Salman Faisal, Saba Faisal, Asim Mehmood, Azra Mohiuddin, Ayesha Gul, Mohsin Gilani	Huma Hina Nafees	Saleem Ghanchi	8 May 2021
100	28	Samaat	Haroon Shahid, Adla Khan, Daniyal Afzal Khan, Asma Saif, Saba Faisal	Mehrunnisa Mustaqeem Khan	Saleem Ghanchi	9 May 2021
101	29	Gardish	Babar Khan, Kamran Jilani, Arooba Mirza, Ayesha Gul	Shagufta Bhatti, Zaid Baloch	Saleem Ghanchi	10 May 2021
102	30	Bohtan	Sidra Niazi, Humayun Ashraf, Azra Mohiuddin, Yasir Shoro	Huma Hina Nafees	Saleem Ghanchi	11 May 2021
103	31	Dhutkar	Arooba Mirza, Daniyal Afzal Khan, Taqi Ahmed, Farah Nadeem, Beena Chaudhary, Saifee Hassan, Mannan Hameed, Anees Alam	Huma Hina Nafees	Saleem Ghanchi	12 May 2021
104	32	Chotay Ustad	Rashid Farooqui, Shameen Khan, Anas Yasin, Zain Afzal, Faiza Gillani, Ali Rizvi	Musharaf Raza	Ali Akbar	28 June 2021
105	33	Aik Aurat Ki Kahani	Kamran Jilani, Shazia Naz, Saba Hameed, Asma Saif, Kausar Siddiqui, Sohail Masood, Sami Khan (child actor)	Ramla Salma	Saleem Ghanchi	29 June 2021
106	34	Lalach	Omer Shahzad, Sabeena Syed, Sukainah Khan, Saba Hameed, Khalifa Sajeeruddin, Farah Nadeem, Haris Khan	Farkhanda Naseem	Ali Akbar	2 July 2021
107	35	Pashemaan	Syed Jibran, Erum Akhtar, Beena Chaudhary, Namrah Shahid	Seemab Huma Tahir	Saleem Ghanchi	5 July 2021
106	36	Ajar	Maria Wasti, Kamran Jilani, Zain Afzal, Babar Khan, Sumaiya Buksh, Farah Nadir	Rabia Razzak	Saleem Ghanchi	6 July 2021
107	37	Sharafat	Anum Fayyaz, Naveed Raza, Zuhab Khan, Ikram Abbasi, Kanwal Khan, Sohail Masood, Birjees Farooqui, Rimha Ahmed	Nuzhat Saman	Saleem Ghanchi	8 July 2021
108	38	Jahez	Mariyam Nafees, Fawad Jalal, Shameen Khan, Junaid Akhtar, Manzoor Qureshi, Seemi Pasha, Akbar Islam, Usman Javaid	Musharaf Raza	Saleem Ghanchi	9 July 2021
109	39	Mujrim	Hira Tareen, Kamran Jilani, Sheryar Ghazali, Fahim Tejani	Rumleh Salmi	Saleem Ghanchi	11 July 2021

=== Season 4 ===
No. in series	No. in season	Title	Main Cast	Written By	Directed By	Original air date
110	1	Main	Hammad Farooqui, Maira Khan, Shazia Naz, Sabiha Hashmi, Fahad, Hareem Sohail, Birjees Farooqui	Saira Arif	Saleem Ghanchi	25 March 2022
111	2	Baddua	Ellie Zaid, Saba Faisal, Naveed Raza, Rushna Khanzada, Talat Shah, Birjees Farooqui, Anees Alam, Uzair Abbasi, Salma Qadir	Saira Arif	Saleem Ghanchi	26 March 2022
112	3	Nafarmaan	Sania Shamshad, Humayun Ashraf, Erum Akhtar, Kinza Malik, Izzah Malik, Majid Khan, Rida Ahmed, Aamir Ali	Huma Hina Nafees	Saleem Ghanchi	27 March 2022
113	4	Bhalai	Rashid Farooqui, Seemi Pasha, Sidra Niazi, Fahima Awan, Kinza Malik	Sana Zafar	Saleem Ghanchi	28 March 2022
114	5	Kamzarf	Anum Fayyaz, Saad Qureshi, Shaheen Khan, Azra Mohiuddin, Hashim Butt, Areej Chaudhry, Roohi Ghazali, Sobia	Suraj Baba	Saleem Ghanchi	29 March 2022
115	6	Jhooti Gawahi	Sania Shamshad, Qaiser Khan Nizamani, Humaira Bano, Birjees Farooqi, Abdul Wahab, Mahrukh, Kiran Shahid	Wajiha Sehar	Saleem Ghanchi	30 March 2022
116	7	Aitebar	Sidra Niazi, Humayun Ashraf, Maryam Noor, Sobia	Wajiha Sehar	Saleem Ghanchi	31 March 2022
117	8	Manhoos	Adla Khan, Azra Mohiuddin, Asim Mehmood, Asma Saif, Anees Alam, Dilawar Khan, Falak Shehzad, Rubab	Suraj Baba	Saleem Ghanchi	31 March 2022
118	9	Dhaar	Tipu Sharif, Beenish Chohan, Ali Rizvi, Shazia Naz, Shehzad Mukhtar	Aliya Bukhari	Saleem Ghanchi	2 April 2022
119	10	Sood	Furqan Qureshi, Adla Khan, Nida Mumtaz, Irfan Motiwala	Nadia Ahmed	Saleem Ghanchi	3 April 2022
120	11	Naik Dil	Humayun Ashraf, Ellie Zaid, Shiza Hasmi, Talat Shah, Hanif Muhammad, Uroosa Arshad, Falak Shehzad, Sobia	Suraj Baba	Saleem Ghanchi	3 April 2022
121	12	Beimaan	Khalid Anum, Seemi Pasha, Raeed Alam, Srha Asghar, Humaira Bano	Suraj Baba	Saleem Ghanchi	4 April 2022
122	13	Bahu	Humayun Ashraf, Sana Nadir, Azra Mohiuddin, Shazia Naz, Ayan Ahmed, Mahrukh Khan, Rohi Ghazali, Nazia, Rabia	Wajiha Sehar	Saleem Ghanchi	5 April 2022
123	14	Zamana	Saad Qureshi, Jinaan Hussain, Seemi Pasha, Danial Afzal Khan, Nida Hussain, Shehzad Mukhtar, Farah Nadeem, Sofia Khan	Saira Arif	Saleem Ghanchi	6 April 2022
124	15	Ehsaan Faramosh	Nida Mumtaz, Taqi Ahmed, Shahood Alvi, Farah Nadir, Fauzia Mushtaq	Nadia Ahmed	Saleem Ghanchi	7 April 2022
125	16	Waseela	Hassan Niazi, Faiza Gilani, Raima Khan, Ahmed, Angel	Wajiha Sehar	Erfan Saleem Ghanchi	8 April 2022
126	17	Khota Sikka	Fazila Lashari, Raeed Alam, Seemi Pasha, Shahood Alvi, Parveen Akbar	Wajiha Sehar	Erfan Saleem Ghanchi	9 April 2022
127	18	Meri Ammi	Hammad Farooqui, Sania Shamshad, Shaheen Khan, Taqi Ahmed, Ikram Abbasi, Nida Mumtaz, Zehra Raza	Suraj Baba	Saleem Ghanchi	10 April 2022
128	19	Ilzam	Ayesha Gul, Shaista Jabeen, Saife Hassan, Nida Firdous, Ahmed Yar Khan, Shaheen Khan	Nadia Ahmed	Erfan Saleem Ghanchi	11 April 2022
129	20	Bekasi	Hina Javed, Furqan Qureshi, Fozia Mushtaq, Emaan, Noreen Fatima, Saba, Shaheryar Ghazali	Wajiha Sehar	Erfan Saleem Ghanchi	12 April 2022
130	21	Buray Parosi	Maria Jaan, Hassan Niazi, Shazia Naz, Noman Habib, Saba Faisal, Mehmood Aslam, Waqar Khan	Nadia Ahmed	Erfan Saleem Ghanchi	13 April 2022
131	22	Anjam	Erum Akhtar, Hassan Ahmed, Seemi Pasha, Fahima Awan, Sofia, Abdul Rehman	Nuzhat Saman	Erfan Saleem Ghanchi	14 April 2022
132	23	Kaanch Ka Ghar	Umair Lagari, Rushna Khan, Hassan Niazi, Erum Akhter, Zuhab, Maria Jaan, Shehzad Mukhtar, Imran Khan, Sajid Rafi	Amber Azhar	Erfan Saleem Ghanchi	16 April 2022
133	24	Beqasoor	Babar Khan, Asma Saif, Danial Afzal Khan, Zubab Rana, Shaheen Khan, Alina Chaudhary, Kiran Shahid, Bushra, Sobia	Aliya Bukhari	Saleem Ghanchi	17 April 2022
134	25	Rishwat	Shabbir Jan, Ayesha Gul, Babar Khan, Shaista Jabeen, Shiraaz Ghazali, Mehboob Sultan, Arisha Razi	Kiran Shah	Erfan Saleem Ghanchi	19 April 2022
135	26	Hassad	Isha Noor, Anum Fayyaz, Parveen Akber, Hashim Butt, Kiran Shahid, Bilal Shahid, Sofia Khan	Suraj Baba	Saleem Ghanchi	22 April 2022
136	27	Bayhiss	Dania Anwer, Tipu Sharif, Beena Chaudhary, Furqan Qureshi, Harmain	Fiza Anwar	Saleem Ghanchi	24 April 2022
137	28	Bughz	Erum Akhtar, Kamran Jilani, Naveed Raza, Adla Khan, Humaira Bano	Farhad Qaimkhani	Erfan Saleem Ghanchi	26 April 2022
138	29	Chaal	Isha Noor, Asim Mehmood, Saba Faisal, Azra Mohiuddin, Yasir Shoro, Bisma Babar, Sharif Balohch	Nuzhat Saman	Saleem Ghanchi	28 April 2022
139	30	Niyat	Asim Mehmood, Dania Anwar, Rimha Ahmed, Saba Faisal, Humaira, Salma Qadir, Uroosa Arshad, Sobia	Tabsir Nishat	Saleem Ghanchi	30 April 2022
140	31	Parwarish	Shaista Jabeen, Babar Khan, Asim Mehmood, Shajeer uddin, Salina Sipra, Bisma Laiq Khan Hussain (Child), Shahriyar ( Child), Sobia, Rabia	Wajiha Sehar	Saleem Ghanchi	1 May 2022

== Spin-Off ==
=== Dikhawa ===
Due to the success of Makafaat, Abdullah and Asad developed another morality-based anthology series under the title "Dikhawa", released in Ramadan 2020. Like Makafaat, it was popular during its run and was renewed for a second season and aired in Ramadan 2021.
