= Baba Jani (TV series) =

- Title Screen
- Genre: Family drama Romantic drama
- Written by: Faiza Iftikhar
- Directed by: Ali Faizan
- Starring: Faysal Qureshi; Savera Nadeem; Saba Hameed; Madiha Imam; Jinaan Hussain
- Country of origin: Pakistan
- Original language: Urdu
- No. of seasons: 1
- No. of episodes: 27

Production
- Producers: Faysal Qureshi; Abdul Qadir Shah
- Production locations: Karachi, Sindh
- Camera setup: Multi-camera setup
- Running time: approx 40 minutes
- Production company: Connect Studios

Original release
- Network: Geo TV
- Release: 8 September 2018 – 28 February 2019

Baba Jani is a Pakistani drama serial that premiered on Geo Entertainment on 8 September 2018. It was written by Faiza Iftikhar, produced by Faysal Qureshi, and directed by Ali Faizan. It stars Faysal Qureshi, Madiha Imam, Savera Nadeem, and Saba Hameed in key roles.

The actor Faysal Qureshi had his debut here as producer under his production house banner Connect Studios. The TV series marked the second on-screen collaboration of Madiha Imam and Faysal Qureshi after Zakham.

== Cast ==
- Faysal Qureshi as Asfand
- Madiha Imam as Nimra
- Savera Nadeem as Sadia
- Saba Hameed as Najeeba
- Faryal Mehmood as Mehwish
- Tipu Sharif as Nasir
- Jinaan Hussain as Naila
- Aamir Qureshi as Saqib
- Mariya Khan as Rakhshanda
- Adla Khan as Nabeela
- Arisha Razi as Aleena
- Ali Ansari as Umair
- Afshan Qureshi as Fareeda
- Shehryar Zaidi as Zahoor Elahi

== Production ==
In May 2018, Faysal revealed that his next project was going to be "Baba Jani", a family drama, and that he was going to make his production debut with this serial. Ali Faizan, who previously directed serials like Khan and Piya Mann Bhaye, joined hands with him for the direction of the serial while the scripts were penned down by Faiza Iftikhar.

About his character, he told The News International, "I play the role of a loyal brother who has three sisters, essayed by Saba Hameed, Jinaan Hussain, and Adla Khan. My character is a very positive one; he is a family man." He also said that his serial is an emotional roller coaster and deals with strained family relations. About the release, he said that it was going to launch on Geo Entertainment after Eid.

== Broadcast and release ==
=== Broadcast ===
Baba Jani premiered on 8 September 2018.

== Awards and nominations ==
Year	Award	Category	Nominee	Result
2020	1st Pakistan International Screen Awards	Best Television Actor	Faysal Qureshi	Nominated
2020	1st Pakistan International Screen Awards	Best Television Director	Ali Faizan	Nominated
