= Kashf (TV series) =

Pakistani television series

- Official title card
- کشف
- Genre: Spiritual drama Family drama Romance
- Developed by: Shahzad Javed
- Written by: Imran Nazeer
- Directed by: Danish Nawaz
- Starring: Hira Mani; Junaid Khan
- Country of origin: Pakistan
- Original language: Urdu
- No. of seasons: 1
- No. of episodes: 29

Production
- Producer: Momina Duraid
- Camera setup: Multi-camera setup
- Running time: approx. 35-40 minutes
- Production company: MD Productions

Original release
- Network: Hum TV
- Release: 7 April – 27 October 2020

Kashf (Urdu: کشف, lit. 'Unveiling') is a 2020 Pakistani spiritual romantic drama television series, that premiered on Hum TV on 7 April 2020. It is written by Imran Nazeer, developed by Shahzad Javed, Head of Content, HUM TV, directed by Danish Nawaz, and produced by Momina Duraid. The show stars Hira Mani in the title role of Kashf, who has experienced recurrent nightmares that eventually take the shape of reality. The supporting cast includes Junaid Khan, Samina Ahmad, Waseem Abbas, Lubna Aslam and Hajra Khan. Music for the series has been composed and produced by Hamza Akram.

The series received mixed reviews, with praise for the performances of Mani and Khan. In addition, Mani received nominations of Best TV Actress - Critics' choice and Best Television Actress - Jury, respectively, at the 20th Lux Style Awards and the 2nd Pakistan International Screen Awards for her performance.

== Plot ==
Kashf (Hira Mani) is a gifted girl who has acquired the ability to foresee future events through her dreams, which are nightmares in most cases about the unfortunate events that will happen in her life. Kashf's family is a set of greedy people, especially her grandmother and her father, Imtiaz, who use Kashf's ability as an advantage and a way to overcome their financial crisis. Kashf's father is the uncle of Wajdan (Junaid Khan) who is the fiancé of Kashf, though they haven't been married for years because of Imtiaz's behaviour. Ashi, Imtiaz's sister, is the breadwinner of the family after her divorce from the false mentor Matiullah. She strongly opposes Imtiaz, when he makes Kashf work with MatiUllah, who runs an Islamic sanctuary. After a change of events, they open their own sanctuary and exploit people in the name of donations. The deal is that Kashf will sit and women from the neighbourhood can ask her about their lives, and then she can tell them the next day through her dreams. Kashf's father doesn't understand that her ability is a natural ability and she cannot foresee the future of someone by herself. Kashf has no control over anything and is very lonely. After Kashf sees recurring nightmares about her family getting ruined, specifically recurring nightmares about her younger sister, Erum, marrying a man who has bad intentions, she insists on getting Erum married to the right person. Wajdan fulfills Imtiaz's condition of giving his home to Imtiaz in order to marry Kashf on the same day Erum is getting married. However, Imtiaz has no intention of marrying them; he simply wants possession of the home. He wants to marry Wajdan to his youngest daughter Zoya; a greedy and ill-willed sister who will stop at nothing to win over Wajdan, with whom she is in love with. Zoya, who had no idea of her father's plan to get her married to Wajdan whom she loved, made plans with matiUllah to tarnish Kashf's reputation.They succeeded in doing so and Imtiaz, to save the sanctuary, married Kashf to Wajdan.

Imtiaz later gets rich because of Kashf and they soon move into their new large home. On the other hand, Wajdan and Kashf both spend their honeymoon out of city and plan to settle there. Despite this, Imtiaz gets angry as their sanctuary starts to become unpopular and people demand to meet Kashf. However, seeing as their plan backfired, in order to bring Kashf back, MatiUllah and Zoya announced their marriage. In shock, Kashf returned and tried to stop Zoya from marrying that monster. Wajdan got irritated by Kashf's obedient attitude and told her to take a stand for herself and stop getting exploited in the name of the sanctuary. MatiUllah got Imtiaz in jail through his connections as Zoya disagreed to marry him at the exact moment. Wajdan had an accident and injures his head. Having no choice, Kashf joined MatiUllah's sanctuary. After Wajdan was back, he was brainwashed by Zoya and his mum. In a state of confusion he divorced Kashf. As Wajdan started losing his senses after doing so, Kashf started losing the will to live. In a nightmare, seeing her dead body, her father begging and Wajdan dancing madly, Kashf woke up in a horrified state. After a few months, Wajdan's mum and Imtiaz got Zoya married to a semi-insane Wajdan without knowing his state of mind. On their wedding night, Wajdan told her that he hated her and loved Kashf, completely lost his senses and ran away. Zoya was suffering because of all her wrong doings. The next day, Kashf dies in a state of sujood and left the whole family in a state of disbelief. Wajdan was seen cleaning a public sanctuary while Kashf's body was being carried to the grave. In the last scene, MatiUllah is seen making a sincere prayer for Kashf.

== Cast ==
- Hira Mani as Kashf Bint-e-Imtiaz
- Junaid Khan as Wajdaan Ibn Fayaaz
- Waseem Abbas as Imtiaz Ahmed
- Munazzah Arif as Dilshad; Kashf's mother
- Lubna Aslam/Asma Abbas as Rashida; Wajdaan's mother
- Maryam Noor as Shumaila
- Samina Ahmad as Kashf's grandmother
- Hajra Khan as Aisha; "Ashi" Kashf's paternal aunt
- Sabeena Farooq as Zoya Wajdan
- Shehryar Zaidi as Fayaaz Ahmed; Wajdan's father
- Saleem Mairaj as Matiullah Shah; Ashi's Ex-Husband
- Tanya Hussain as Erum Waleed
- Amir Qureshi as Aisha's Love interest
- Agha Talal
- Abul Hasan as Babar; Erum's Ex-Fiancé

== Production ==
On 14 November 2019, Junaid Khan revealed through Instagram about his upcoming project. In December 2019, it was reported that Hira Mani would be paired with Khan in the lead.

The first teaser was released on 20 March 2020. It is the fourth project featuring Mani and Khan together after Sun Yaara (2016), Thays (2018) and Mohabbat Na Kariyo while both are second time collaborating with writer Imran Nazeer after Thays and director Danish Nawaz after Suna Yaara.

== Episodes ==
No.	Title	Directed by	Written by	Original release date
1	"Episode #01"	Danish Nawaz	Imran Nazeer	April 7, 2020
Kashf has a dream that when she visits a graveyard, she smells a rose. Then, she holds a rose given by her fiancé which stings her hand. She wakes up abruptly after that. She tells Wajdan about her dream who ignores it as usual. Wajdan's mother, Rashida is not happy with their engagement. Kashf visits graveyard with her grandmother to offer fatiha at his grandfather's grave. While showering roses there, one rose stings her the same way as in her dream. Episodic reference:

== Broadcast and release ==
Kashf premiered on Hum TV on 7 April 2020.

The series was made available on the Indian OTT platform MX Player.

== Reception ==
=== Critical reception ===
While praising Mani's performance, Buraq Shabbir of The News International opined that the series "allows her to showcase her acting prowess like never before." Writing for the same newspaper, Amna Haider Isani criticised the portrayal of toxic sibling rivalry and the moral extremes. A Daily Times-based reviewer was appreciative of Khan's performance and her chemistry with Mani.

== Awards and nominations ==
Date of ceremony	Award	Category	Recipients	Result	Ref.
9 October 2021	Lux Style Awards	Best Female Actor - Critics	Hira Mani	Nominated	
5 November 2021	Pakistan International Screen Awards	Best Television Actress (Jury)	Hira Mani	Nominated	
5 November 2021	Pakistan International Screen Awards	Best Supporting Actor	Waseem Abbas	Nominated	
