= Iltija =

Pakistani television series

- Written by: Saji Gul
- Directed by: Mazhar Moin
- Starring: Tooba Siddiqui; Affan Waheed; Caitlyn Espinherio; Rubina Ashraf; Imran Ashraf
- Country of origin: Pakistan
- Original language: Urdu
- No. of episodes: 29

Production
- Producers: Sana Shahnawaz; Samina Humayun Saeed
- Production company: Next Level Entertainment

Original release
- Network: ARY Digital
- Release: 8 April – 4 November 2017

Iltija (transl. Imploration) is a Pakistani television physiological drama series produced by Sana Shahnawaz and Samina Humayun Saeed under banner Next Level Entertainment. It is written by Saji Gul and directed by Mazhar Moin. Iltija focuses on the struggle of families who bring up children with disabilities such as Down syndrome and Quadriplegia. It features a leading cast of Affan Waheed, Tooba Siddiqui, Rubina Ashraf, Imran Ashraf and child star Caitlyn Espinherio who actually has Down syndrome.

== Synopsis ==
The story revolves around Hina and Sameer who love each other and marry. After their marriage, the test of their relationship starts when Hina births a girl with Down syndrome. Due to the birth of a child who is not as normal as others, Sameer's mother does not like Hina and due to her interference she has to leave Sameer's house. Hina than starts living in her mother's house where she brings up her daughter Khushi, alone.

== Cast ==
- Tooba Siddiqui as Hina
- Affan Waheed as Sameer
- Caitlyn Espinherio as Khushi
- Rubina Ashraf as Sameer's mother
- Laila Wasti as Adeela
- Ali Tahir as Saqib
- Yashma Gill as Tayyaba
- Yasir Shah as Razi
- Imran Ashraf as Hadi
- Seemi Pasha as Hina's mother
- Mariam Mirza as doctor (special appearance)
- Akbar Subhani (special appearance)

== Production ==
In October 2016, it reported that Tooba Siddiqui will make her television comeback with Saji Gul's script about Down's Syndrome. She shared to DAWN Images that "My character's a woman who has a child suffering from Down's sundrome. Different events in her life have strained her relationship with her family and friends." Director Mazhar Moin said in an interview that many of the actors rejected the serial due to it not being a mainstream media project.

== Reception ==
Along with a few television series of the series, DAWN Images said it as a serial of the year with a different story from the others. Hira Hyder of The Express Tribune critiqued the series for its poor portrayal of Down syndrome, abandoning its chance to raise awareness and instead poorly portraying people with disabilities.

The series mostly had the ratings of 4–6TRPs.
