= Yun Tu Hai Pyar Bohut =

Pakistani television series

- Genre: Romance; Serial drama
- Written by: Aliya Bukhari
- Directed by: Kashif Saleem
- Starring: Hira Mani; Affan Waheed; Sabeena Syed; Javed Sheikh; Nadia Hussain; Komal Rizvi; Mariam Mirza
- Theme music composer: AD Studio
- Opening theme: Yun Tu Hai Pyaar Bohut
- Country of origin: Pakistan
- Original language: Urdu
- No. of episodes: 27

Production
- Executive producer: Momina Duraid
- Running time: approx. 38-40 minutes
- Production company: Film Factory

Original release
- Network: Hum TV
- Release: 8 June – 29 October 2021

Yun Tu Hai Pyar Bohut (transl. Although there is much love) is a Pakistani television series directed and produced by Kashif Saleem under the banner Film Factory, written by Aliya Bukhari and aired on Hum TV. It stars Hira Mani and Affan Waheed in lead roles. It marked their third on-screen appearance after Do Bol and Ghalati. The serial received praise for its strong writing and progressive themes.

== Plot ==
Aima is a young ambitious girl, studying law and is the sole breadwinner of her family. She lives with her mother and younger sister, Naji who is immature and somehow irresponsible. Aima is in love with her cousin Zain and vice versa, but unlike her Zain is not too excited and ambitious about his aspirations to become a singer. Aima's father Mohsin married Roohi and left Aima's mother years ago. Mohsin has a daughter, Sonia who is fond of music and her mother is worried about her. Sonia comes across Zain in a school where both of them work and become friends.

Due to Zain's careless behaviour, Aima stops seeing him and moves on. She gets a job and assists a senior lawyer. Zain also moves to Lahore for better opportunities. In Lahore he lives with a couple Maqsood and Deena and their little son Sarwaar (Saru).

== Cast ==
Main

- Affan Waheed as Zain
- Hira Mani as Aima

Recurring

- Sabeena Syed as Sonia
- Javaid Sheikh as Mohsin
- Nadia Hussain as Roohi
- Abeer Sajid as Nazi/ Nazreen
- Akhtar Hasnain as Rehan
- Komal Rizvi as Noor
- Muneeb Baig
- Hina Chaudhary as Deena
- Mariam Mirza as Talat
- Fawad Jalal as Sarwar
- Qaiser Khan Nizamani as Advocate
- Rizwan Ali Jaffri as Fakher
- Faisal Masood
- Abdullah (child star)

== Soundtrack ==
Yun Tu Hai Pyar Boht - OST

Soundtrack album by: Ayaz Sheikh; Jibran Raheel; Hira Mani
- Released: 26 May 2021
- Recorded: 2021
- Studio: AD Studio
- Genre: Television soundtrack
- Length: 1:33
- Language: Urdu
- Label: Hum TV
- Producer: Syed Adeel Ali

Music video
- "OST: Yun Tu Hai Pyar Bohut" on YouTube

The soundtrack is sung by Jibran Raheel Hira Mani and Ayaz Sheikh with lyrics by SK Khalish.

== Production ==
=== Broadcast ===
There were several discussions laid on its time slot previously, it was announced that the show would premier on May 21, 2021, airing an episode on Fridays at 9pm slot. Later, it was switched to Mondays and Tuesdays at 8pm slot by replacing Safar Tamam Howa as it came to an end. After the start of the drama serial Parizaad, it shifted to only Mondays at 8pm. But then again timings changed and Aakhir Kab Tak, which used to air on Sundays started to air on Mondays because of Hum Kahan Ke Sachay Thay and Yun Tu Hai Pyar Bohut shifted to Fridays at 8pm.
