= Yaqeen Ka Safar =

Pakistani television drama series

- Title card
- Urdu: یَقین کا سَفر
- Genre: Romantic drama; Crime drama
- Created by: Momina Duraid
- Based on: Woh Yaqeen Ka Aik Naya Safar by Farhat Ishtiaq
- Written by: Farhat Ishtiaq
- Directed by: Shahzad Kashmiri
- Starring: Sajal Ali; Ahad Raza Mir; Hira Mani; Shaz Khan; Suhaee Abro; Jahanzeb Gurchani; Farhan Ali Agha; Mohammed Ehteshamuddin; Shamyl Khan
- Theme music composer: Waqar Ali; Syed Sohail Haider
- Opening theme: "Yaqeen Ka Safar" by Hadiqa Kiani
- Country of origin: Pakistan
- Original language: Urdu
- No. of seasons: 1
- No. of episodes: 29

Production
- Executive producer: Momina Duraid
- Producer: Momina Duraid
- Production locations: Neelum Valley and Karachi
- Running time: 39–40 minutes
- Production company: MD Productions

Original release
- Network: Hum TV
- Release: 19 April – 1 November 2017

Yaqeen Ka Safar (Urdu: یقین کا سفر, lit. 'The Journey of Trust') is a Pakistani television drama series produced by Momina Duraid through MD Productions for Hum TV. It was written by Farhat Ishtiaq, based on Ishtiaq's novel Woh Yakeen Ka Naya Safar and was directed by Shahzad Kashmiri. It aired from 19 April 2017 to 1 November 2017 for a total of 29 episodes.

Yaqeen Ka Safar tells the story of Asfand and Zubiya, who grow after facing hardships and struggles. It was written and produced by the creators of Humsafar, Mata-e-Jaan Hai Tu, Diyar-e-Dil, Udaari and Bin Roye. Its ensemble cast consists of Ahad Raza Mir as Dr Asfandyar, Sajal Ali as Dr Zubiya, Shaz Khan as Daniyal, Hira Mani as Gaiti and Suhaee Abro as Noorie in leading roles. It aired simultaneously in Pakistan, the UK, the US, Australia, New Zealand, Ireland, and the UAE on the same date and time. The first half of the show was set in Karachi and later in Neelum Valley.

Yaqeen Ka Safar was one of the highest-ranked dramas in Pakistan in 2017.

== Premise ==
Yaqeen Ka Safar starts with three stories.

Zubia Khalil is a young girl mourning her mother's sudden death at the hands of her physically violent father. Zubia needed to visit a friend's house to borrow important lecture notes and she insisted that her mother accompany her, despite her father forbidding her mother to leave the house alone. When Khalil, father of zubia discovered Zubia's mother disobeyed him, he slapped her so hard she fell and ended up hitting the corner of the bed, dying on the spot. Zubia's aunt, Mahjabeen Khala consoles the devastated; Zubia tells her the truth. But Khalil threatens her and the whole family to stay silent regarding the cause of the mother's death.

The second story involves a family in Islamabad celebrating their son Daniyal's wedding to Gaiti Ara. Daniyal is a young lawyer who has recently graduated from London and is extremely fearless, confident, brave and honest. Asfandyar is Daniyal's younger brother, who will soon leave for Karachi to complete his medical studies after his brother's wedding. Daniyal is a lively person and quite ambitious as well. The family maintains a significant reputation in the community as Usman, Daniyal and Asfandyar's father, is a successful lawyer, too. Asfandyar is engaged to Faryal.

The third storyline involves Noori, a young girl living in a rural village of Sindh (Rab Nawaz.) who is gang-raped by a minister's son, Jahangir Shah, along with two of his friends. The police inquire about the incident and ask her quite inappropriate questions. Noori's younger brother stands up for her, but her parents remain silent because of their poverty. The police threaten Noori's father. Their family is insulted in the village, so Noori leaves her home. She is then found by and taken to Karachi by Rumana, an NGO lady in Karachi. Rumana informs Daniyal about the Noori gang rape incident.

== Cast ==
=== Main ===
- Sajal Ali as Dr. Zubiya "Zubi" Asfandyar Ali Khan (nee Khalil), Khalil and Mah - E - Talat's daughter; Rehan's sister; Asfandyar's wife.
- Ahad Raza Mir as Dr. Asfandyar "Asfi" Ali Khan, Usman and Lubna's son; Daniyal's brother; Zubiya's husband.
- Hira Mani as Gaeti Haroon (nee Asif; formerly Daniyal Ali Khan), Asif and Durdana's daughter; Daniyal's widow; Saim's mother; Haroon's wife.
- Shaz Khan as Barrister Daniyal Ali Khan, Usman and Lubna's son; Asfandyar's brother; Gaeti's husband; Saim's father.
- Farhan Ali Agha as Barrister Usman Ali Khan, Lubna's husband; Durdana and Rizwan's brother; Daniyal and Asfandyar's father.
- Suhaee Abro as Noori / Noor Bano

=== Supporting ===
- Mohammed Ehteshamuddin as Khalil, Mah - E - Talat's widower; Rehan and Zubiya's father.
- Beenish Raja as Sheema Rehan, Rehan's wife; Arham's mother.
- Afraz Rasool as Rehan Khalil, Khalil and Mah - E - Talat's son; Zubiya's brother; Sheema's husband; Arham's father.
- Sabeena Syed as Faryaal Rizwan, Rizwan and Rukhsana's daughter; Asfandyar's ex fiancée.
- Aisha Khan Jr. as Urooj Nisar
- Shamyl Khan as Dr. Shahroze, Asifa's husband.
- Shamayel Tareen as Dr. Asifa Shahroze, Shahroze's wife.
- Salman Saqib Sheikh as Dr. Haroon, Gaeti's husband; Saim's step father.
- Nasreen Naz as Noori's mother
- Ismail Chandio as Latif Bakhtawar, Noori's father
- Ali Gul Mallah as Rab Nawaz's assistant
- Sabiha Sumar as Lubna Usman Ali Khan, Usman's wife; Daniyal and Asfandyar's mother.
- Huma Nawab as Mahjabeen, Mah - E - Talat's sister; Zubia's aunt; Mohsin's mother.
- Annie Zaidi as Durdana Asif, Asifa's wife; Gaeti's mother; Usman and Rizwan's sister.
- Munazzah Arif as Rukhsana Rizwan, Rizwan's wife; Faryaal's mother.
- Nabeel Zuberi as Ramiz, Zubia's ex boyfriend.
- Agha Talal as Mohsin, Mahjabeen's son.
- Zia Gurchani as Asif, Gaeti's father; Durdana's husband.
- Javed Iqbal as Rizwan Ali Khan, Rukhsana's husband; Usman and Durdana's brother; Faryaal's father.
- Akbar Islam as SSP Shehzad Ahmed
- Naima Khan as Jehangir's mother
- Fazila Qazi as Mah-E-Talat, Khalil's wife; Rehan and Zubia's mother.
- Zainab Qayyum as Rumana, Women activist.
- Jahanzeb Gurchani as Rab Nawaz Shah, Jehangir's father.
- Mariyam Nafees as Khajista Khan, Zubiya's friend.
- Hassan Noman as Bahadur Khan, Khajista's husband.
- Hassan Shah as Jahangir Shah, Noori's culprit.
- Ismat Zaidi as Mah - E - Talat and Mahjabeen's mother; Rehan, Zubia and Mohsin's grandmother.
- Nawal Saeed as Misbah, Zubia's college friend.
- Ibrahim Salman as Saim Daniyal Ali Khan, Daniyal and Gaeti's son; Haroon's step son.
- Subhan Awan as Zubiya's prospect suitor

== Production ==
=== Development ===
Hum TV's senior producer Momina Duraid of MD Productions, developed Yakeen Ka Safar. The channel hired the director Shahzad Kashmiri who previously directed Roye for the same channel. Along with Kashmiri, they finalised Mirza Zeeshan Baig as the art director. It was Baig's return to Hum Television after he directed Diyar-e-Dil, Mann Mayal, Sanam, Dil Banjaara and Alif Allah Aur Insaan for the same channel. Tameen Nazami and Safdar Hussain Rind were the cinematographers. The serial is based on award-winning writer Farhat Ishtiaq's novel Woh Yakeen Ka Ek Naya Safar. Ishtiaq also wrote the screenplay, while Muhammad Wasi-ul-Din composed the script, who has previously worked with her with the channel's series Diyar-e-Dil and Bin Roye. Ishtiaq has previously worked with Duraid, where she wrote mega-hit drama serials in Pakistan television history, Humsafar, Mata-e-Jaan Hai Tu, Diyar-e-Dil. Bin Roye and Udaari. Waqar Ali and Suhail Haider composed the song, while MAD Music gave the background score. Hadiqa Kiani and Richa Sharma performed the OST. Yaqeen Ka Safar is the second collaboration of writer and director after 2015's hit film Bin Roye. The show aired a weekly episode for 35–40 minutes (minus commercials) every Wednesday.

There were several discussions regarding its time slot. It was announced that the show would premiere on 12 April 2017, airing an episode on Friday's replacing Dil Banjaara. However, since Dil-e-Jaanam bought lower ratings to channel's Wednesday slot, Yakeen Ka Safar was shifted to Wednesdays and was delayed till 15 April 2017 due to promotional reasons.

=== Casting ===
Sajal Ali, Ahad Raza Mir, Shaz Khan and Hira Salman were selected to portray the leading roles of Zubiya, Asfandyar, Daniyal and Gaeti. Aly made her television comeback two years after her 2015 TV series Gul-e-Rana. After completing her Bollywood debut, Mom, Sajal portrayed Dr. Zubiya and signed O Rangreza for the same channel. Mir, who made his television debut in Sammi, was finalised after his success in portraying the role of Salar in Sammi. The actor received critical acclaim and appraisal for his role as Dr Asfandyar. Film actor Shaz Khan was finalised to portray the role of Daniyal during his filming session in the channel's upcoming film Parwaaz Hay Junoon. While Salman returned to the network after her 2015 TV serial Preet Na Kariyo Koi, portraying the role of Gaeti, Salman joined filming after completing her ARY project Sun Yaara, alongside Salman her husband Mani was also cast where he portrayed the role of Dr. Haroon. The production house also chose actors Farhan Ali Agha, Mohammed Ehteshamuddin, and Maryam Nafees to play the roles of Usman, Noori, Khalil and Khajista.

== Release ==
Yakeen Ka Safar premiered on 19 April 2017 and aired weekly, with a new episode being broadcast every Wednesday at 8:00 pm. The show aired on Hum Europe in the UK, Hum TV USA in the US and Hum TV Mena in the UAE, with the same times and premiere date. It was broadcast by Hum Network's new channel Hum World HD for the US and Canada. It was rebroadcast on Hum TV in Pakistan, premiering on 8 October 2018 at the 10 pm slot. In 2019, it also aired on the national channel PTV Home started in August 2019, airing two episodes (Friday and Saturday) every week. A dubbed version is currently airing on Hum Pashto 1 in Pashto under the title دباور سفر.

=== Home media and digital release ===
Yakeen Ka Safar was also released on Hum TV's YouTube channel alongside its airing, but later the channel deleted all its episodes. It was also released on the iflix as a part of the channel's contract. When the contract was terminated in 2019, all its episodes were removed and thus could not be streamed digitally anymore. Later Yakeen Ka Safar was also released on OTT, the platform MX Player. In July 2019, the channel re-uploaded all episodes on YouTube. A few episodes are also available on Amazon Prime Video.

== Music ==
Yakeen Ka Safar OST

Soundtrack album by Hadiqa Kiani & Richa Sharma
- Released: 19 April 2017
- Recorded: 2017
- Genre: Television soundtrack
- Length: 04 Minutes 20 Seconds (3:12)
- Language: Urdu
- Label: M.D Productions
- Producer: Momina Duraid

Mad Music gave the background score for the series. The title song of Yakeen Ka Safar was composed by Waqar Ali, while Naseer Turabi penned the lyrics. Hadiqa Kiani performed the OST. The singer returned to Hum TV after singing the OST for the channel's hit drama series Udaari in 2016. The OST "Mitti kay Parindey" was composed by Syed Suhail Haider, and its lyrics were written by Kashif Anwar. Richa Sharma performed the OST.

=== Track listing ===
All lyrics are written by Naseer Turabi & Richa Sharma; all music is composed by Waqar Ali & Mad Music.

No.	Title	Artist(s)	Length
1.	"Yakeen Ka Safar"	Hadiqa Kiani	3:12
2.	"Mitti Kay Parindey"	Richa Sharma	2:55
Total length:			6:07

== Reception ==
The serial received critical praise, especially for the storyline, cinematography and performances of the star cast. While praising the refreshing storyline without much romantic angle and multiple themes of the series, The Express Tribune wrote, "Yaqeen Ka Safar is honest and original, and has changed the paradigm of Pakistani dramas." While reviewing positively, Buraq Shabbir of The News International said it was more realistic than other serials aired at that time stating, "It views people as professionals while tapping into their personal lives as well, making it more relatable". DAWN Images praised Mir's complex and nuanced portrayal of Dr. Asfandyar.

== Awards and nominations ==
Year	Date	Award	Category	Recipient(s)	Result	Ref
2018	July 28, 2018	Hum Awards	Best Drama Serial - Popular	Momina Duraid	Won	
2018	July 28, 2018	Hum Awards	Best Drama Serial - Jury	Momina Duraid	Nominated	
2018	July 28, 2018	Hum Awards	Best Director Drama Serial	Shahzad Kashmiri	Nominated	
2018	July 28, 2018	Hum Awards	Best Writer Drama Serial	Farhat Ishtiaq	Nominated	
2018	July 28, 2018	Hum Awards	Best Actor - Popular	Ahad Raza Mir	Won	
2018	July 28, 2018	Hum Awards	Best Actor - Jury	Ahad Raza Mir	Nominated	
2018	July 28, 2018	Hum Awards	Best Actress - Popular	Sajal Aly	Won	
2018	July 28, 2018	Hum Awards	Best Actress - Jury	Sajal Aly	Nominated	
2018	July 28, 2018	Hum Awards	Best Sensation Male	Ahad Raza Mir	Won	
2018	July 28, 2018	Hum Awards	Best Supporting Actor - Male	Ehteshamuddin	Nominated	
2018	July 28, 2018	Hum Awards	Best Supporting Actor - Female	Hira Mani	Nominated	
2018	July 28, 2018	Hum Awards	Most Impactful Character	Shaz Khan	Nominated	
2018	July 28, 2018	Hum Awards	Best Original Soundtrack	"Gumaan Ke Paar" by Hadiqa Kiani	Nominated	
2018	July 28, 2018	Hum Awards	Best Onscreen Couple - Jury	Sajal Aly and Ahad Raza Mir	Nominated	
2018	July 28, 2018	Hum Awards	Best Onscreen Couple - Popular	Sajal Aly and Ahad Raza Mir	Won	
2018	February 20, 2018	Lux Style Awards	Best TV Actor	Ahad Raza Mir	Won	
2018	February 20, 2018	Lux Style Awards	Best TV Actress	Sajal Aly	Nominated	
2018	10 September 2018	IPPA Awards				
2018	10 September 2018	IPPA Awards	Best TV Play (Viewer's Choice)	Momina Duraid	Won	
2018	10 September 2018	IPPA Awards	Best TV Director (Viewer's Choice)	Shahzad Kashmiri	Nominated	
2018	10 September 2018	IPPA Awards	Best TV Actor (Viewer's Choice)	Ahad Raza Mir	Nominated	
2018	10 September 2018	IPPA Awards	Best Actress TV (Viewer's Choice)	Sajal Aly	Nominated	
2018	10 September 2018	IPPA Awards	Best Actress TV (Jury's Choice)	Sajal Aly	Won	
2018	10 September 2018	IPPA Awards	Best Supporting Actor	Ehteshamuddin	Nominated	
2018	10 September 2018	IPPA Awards	Best Jodi of the year	Ahad Raza Mir and Sajal Ali	Won	
2018	10 September 2018	IPPA Awards	Best New Emerging Talent	Ahad Raza Mir	Won	

== See also ==
- List of programs broadcast by Hum TV
- 2017 in Pakistani television
