= Aymen Saleem =

Pakistani actress and model (born 1993)

- Born: 13 January 1993 (age 33); Karachi, Pakistan
- Education: Karachi Grammar School; University of Pennsylvania (Graduation)
- Occupations: Actress; model
- Years active: 2020–present
- Political party: PPP
- Family: Saleem Yousuf (father)

Aymen Saleem (born January 12, 1993) is a Pakistani actress and model who appears in Urdu television shows. She made her acting debut with Hum TV's Ramadan special Chupke Chupke as Ramisha aka Mishi (2021), which earned her a nomination for Best Emerging Talent in TV at Lux Style Awards.

In 2022, Saleem made her television comeback after one year with another Ramadan drama Paristan as Pernia, followed by a leading role as Aliya in feminism romance Ibn-e-Hawwa on Hum TV.

== Early life and education ==
Aymen was born on 13 January 1993, in Karachi. Her father, Saleem Yousuf, is a former Pakistani cricketer. She finished her A-levels at Karachi Grammar School. She earned her undergrad in Business with double majors in Finance and Strategic Management in 2017 from Wharton School of Business University of Pennsylvania.

Aymen attempted for a Guinness World Record in 2010 at the age of 17 when she fitted herself, along with 18 other girls, into a smart car with closed doors for 19 seconds.

== Career ==
She started her career as an intern for an Investment Bank J. P. Morgan and start working as a Management Consultant at McKinsey & Company where she was dealing with Governments and Ministries of the Middle East, making policies for Abu Dhabi, Dubai and the overall MENA region.

In 2020, she acted in a Hum TV production, Chupke Chupke, which aired in 2021 and starred with Ayeza Khan, Osman Khalid Butt, Arslan Naseer, and Mira Sethi. Her second project was Ibn-e-Hawwa with Hira Mani and Shahzad Sheikh. She again paired with Arslan Naseer in HumTv's Ramzan drama Paristan.

== Television ==
Year	Title	Role	Notes
2021	Chupke Chupke	Ramisha aka Mishi	TV debut
2022	Ibn-e-Hawa	Aliya	Lead
2022	Paristan	Pernia “Pari”	Lead

== Awards ==
Year	Awards	Category	Work	Result	Ref.
2022	Lux Style Awards	Best Emerging Talent in TV	Chupke Chupke	Won	
