= Saltanat-e-Dil =

- Genre: Love Story
- Written by: Myra Sajid
- Directed by: Syed Ali Raza Usama
- Starring: Sami Khan; Sarah Khan; Aleezay Rasul
- Country of origin: Pakistan
- Original language: Urdu
- No. of episodes: 27

Production
- Producers: Asif Raza Mir; Babar Javed
- Production location: Pakistan
- Running time: Approx 40 Minutes

Original release
- Network: Geo TV
- Release: 18 December 2014 – 5 June 2015

Saltanat-e-Dil (Eng lit; Kingdom of Heart) is a 2014 Pakistani drama serial directed by Bashar Momin director Syed Ali Raza Usama, produced by Asif Raza Mir and Babar Javed and written by Myra Sajid. The drama stars Sami Khan, Sarah Khan, and Aleezay Rasul in lead roles. It premiered on 18 December 2014 on Geo Entertainment and aired on Thursday nights at 8:00 PST. It was the second appearance of Sami Khan and Aleezay Rasool after Bikhra Mera Naseeb.

== Synopsis ==
Set in the Shahpur district, the story revolves around Wajdan (Sami Khan) and Anushay (Sarah Khan), who are in love with each other and plan to marry. Wajdan belongs to an upper class family and lives with his mother Mehtab Bano (Asma Abbas). Being the sole owner of the family riches and in the position of power, Mehtab Bano expects everyone to obey her whims. Wajdan loves his mother a lot and respects her every decision. Differences between them arise when Wajdan expresses his wish to marry Anushay. Mehtab Bano refuses as Anushay belongs to a middle class family. In her point of view, differences between class and status lead to poor relationships. On the other hand, Wajdan is adamant about marrying Anushay while Mehtab Bano begins to despise Anushay and goes on to plan her murder. As Anushay struggles between life and death, Mehtab Bano forces Wajdan to marry a girl of her own choice, Rania (Alizey Rasul). Wajdan is unable to accept Rania as his wife and tells her that he still loves Anushay. Saltanat-e-Dil is a compelling story of three individuals as they are manipulated by Mehtab Bano's tricks.

== Cast and characters ==
- Sami Khan as Nawab Wajdaan Shah
- Asma Abbas as Mehtab Bano (Amma Begum)
- Sarah Khan as Anushey Hayat
- Aleezay Rasul as Rania
- Mazhar Ali as Fazal Hayat
- Fazila Qazi as Shehr Bano
- Seemi Pasha as Sultana Hayat
- Yasir Mazhar as Aleem
- Amir Qureshi as Sarfaraz Shah
- Syed Ali Hassan as Imran
- Parvez Raza
- Junaid Butt
- Fozia Samoo
- Anwer Iqbal

=== Guest appearance ===
- Abdullah Ejaz as Nawab Farhan Shah

== Reception ==
Although the drama serial had a cast of Asma Abbas, Fazila Qazi, Sami Khan, and Sarah Khan it was disliked by some viewers due to the ascendency of Hindi serials, and that it was based on the familiar theme of one man with two wives. Syed Ali Raza Usama's direction was appreciated but despite its high budget it had poor ratings.
