= Izzat (TV series) =

2026 Pakistani television series

- Genre: Drama
- Written by: Ilham Asim
- Directed by: Aamir Yousuf
- Starring: Merub Ali; Atabik Mohsin; Hashaam Khan; Nadia Hussain; Saleem Sheikh
- Country of origin: Pakistan
- Original language: Urdu

Original release
- Network: ARY Digital
- Release: 20 September 2026 – present

Izzat is a 2026 Pakistani television series written by Ilham Asim and directed by Aamir Yousuf. The series stars Merub Ali, Atabik Mohsin and Hashaam Khan in leading roles, alongside Nadia Hussain, Saleem Sheikh and others. It premiered on ARY Digital on 20 September 2026.

== Plot ==
The story follows Rutba (Merub Ali) and Rayyan (Atabik Mohsin), cousins whose childhood friendship develops into a romantic relationship. Their plans for marriage face difficulties when Anas (Hashaam Khan), another cousin who has feelings for Rutba, becomes involved in their relationship. The resulting conflict brings challenges to the couple's relationship and family life.

== Cast ==
- Merub Ali as Rutba
- Atabik Mohsin as Rayyan
- Hashaam Khan as Anas
- Nadia Hussain
- Saleem Sheikh
- Ayesha Sohail
- Yaseen Ali
- Adnan Shah Tipu
- Tipu Sharif
- Hira Umer
- Fahima Awan

== Production and release ==
ARY Digital announced the series in September 2026. Its promotional teasers introduced the principal cast and presented the story as a romance that encounters unexpected difficulties.

The series premiered on 20 September 2026 and airs on ARY Digital.
