= Mani (actor) =

Pakistani television actor

- مانی
- Born: Salman Saqib Shaikh; 22 March 1978 (age 48)
- Occupations: Actor, VJ, Host
- Years active: 2000–present
- Spouse: Hira Mani (m. 2008)
- Children: Muzammil and Ibrahim

Salman Saqib Sheikh (Urdu: سلمان ثاقب شیخ), credited as Mani, is a Pakistani actor, producer, screenwriter, politician and host. Mani is mostly known for his comic roles. He started his career as an anchor and roadshow host before becoming a sitcom and comedy actor.

He is known for his roles in Meri Teri Kahani, Bandish and the telefilm Dil Toh Bacha Hai.

== Early life ==
Mani was born on 22 March 1977 and was raised in a locality of Gulshan-e-Iqbal in Karachi. During an interview with Samina Peerzada, Mani explains that despite his father Saquib Sheikh and elder sister Ayesha Mirza being actors, he was interested in sports during his early years and did not think to venture into television. His initial interest grew after a minor appearance in theatre, with the theatre group Katha stars Sania Saeed and Nadia Jamil.

== Media career ==
=== Early career as actor and scriptwriter ===
He started his career in television as a junior anchor and host before becoming an actor. He wrote scripts for Fakhar-e-Alam's show Boom Boom Bastic which aired on PTV. In the early 2000s, he also worked on various shows, including Sarak Chapp, which aired on Geo TV and ATV. Mani among Azfar Ali also created the Azfar Mani Show on AAG TV. The show experienced significant growth within the community and among the general public. This airing made them popular among Pakistani TV channels.

Mani also participated in campaigns run by Shaukat Khanum Cancer Hospital which experienced a great turnout due to his popularity in Pakistan at the time. He was also cast in various commercials and campaigns for Pepsi, Tepal, Ufone, and Mobilink.

=== Host ===
In 2001, he hosted the first ever Road Show in Pakistan's Television history called Streets. Aired on Indus Vision, the show conducted street interviews on contemporary issues. He was one of the first to introduce Road Shows to Pakistan, succeeding commercially due to its authentic nature. He also hosted two other road shows called Road Romeo and Sarrak Chhap aired on ATV and Geo TV respectively.

Mani is also known as the pioneer of roadshows. He was a part of what is now known as the golden era of Pakistani Television. Mani was a part of the show Sub Set Hai including himself, Adnan Shah Tipu, Salma Hassan, and Azfar Ali. The show was met with great audience reception throughout the Indian subcontinent. Mani had been part of various music channels, such as Indus Music and The Music.

A similar show Ulta Seedha, penned by Faisal Qureshi, co-hosted by Mani, was also aired on Geo TV. Mani then hosted the first talk show Casual for newly founded Hum TV in 2006. Hira and Mani started the show at Hum TV, specifically the Hum 2 Humara Show. Both of them served as the show's hosts. They upheld their reputation as an ideal couple, receiving widespread affection from the audience. The show aired for about three years, during which time different actors and actresses came together on the TV show.

=== Production ===
Mani produced a sports show Champions on ARY Digital. He also produced sitcoms Zerooos and Khala Surayya aired on Geo TV.

== Political career ==
Besides being an actor, Mani is also very active in politics. He actively supported Imran Khan's Pakistan Tehreek-e-Insaf and attended several processions across Pakistan before joining the Pak Sarzameen Party in 2018. He and his wife, Hira Mani, have criticized Imran Khan and Altaf Hussain on several occasions. He also participated in the polio campaign for UNICEF.

== Personal life ==
He married fellow actress Hira Salman in 2008. Hira Salman, commonly known as Hira Mani, in her interview at Speak Your Heart With Samina Peerzada on 19 Oct 2018 explained how she met Mani. She had secretly gotten Mani's phone number from his then girlfriend and phoned him under the alias of Mariam. During this time she was engaged to a Banker in Dubai whom she later left to be with Mani. Their marriage ceremony took place on 18 April 2008. They frequently work together in most of their projects after marriage. together they have two sons: Muzammil (born in 2009) and Ibrahim (born in 2014).

== Television ==
=== Host ===
| Year | Title | Network | Notes |
|---|---|---|---|
| 2001 | Streets | Indus Vision | Pakistan's first road show |
| 2001 | Mani Says | Indus Music | Pakistan's first trolling show |
| 2002 | Road Romeo | ATV | |
| 2002 | Sarak Chaap | Geo TV | |
| 2006 | Mani-Ism | ARY Musik | |
| 2007 | Casual | Hum TV | Political satire |
| 2007 | Azfar Mani Show | Aag TV | |
| 2007 | Champions | | Sports show |
| 2008 | Hero Ya Zero | Hum TV | Game show |
| 2010 | Hum 2 Humara Show | Hum TV | |
| 2011 | Hira Mani Show | AAG TV | |

=== Actor, producer and screenwriter ===
| Year | Title | Role | Network | Writer | Producer | Notes |
|---|---|---|---|---|---|---|
| 2000 | Mera Ghar Aik Whirpool | | PTV | Yes | | |
| 2001 | Sub Set Hai | Bobby | Indus TV | | Yes | |
| 2001 | Kollege Jeans | | PTV | | | |
| 2003 | Ulta Seedha | Ilyas Soomro | Geo TV | | | Serial with Faisal Qureshi |
| 2008 | Ab Set Hai | Bobby | AAG TV | Yes | | |
| 2008 | Chaudhween Ka Chand | Shakeel | Hum TV | | | |
| 2010 | Khala Surayya | | Geo TV | Yes | Yes | |
| 2010 | Zerooos | Meenu | Hum TV | | Yes | Sitcom |
| 2013 | Shilae Maseen | | Geo TV | | Yes | Telefilm |
| 2013 | Meri Teri Kahani | Mani | ARY Digital | | | Inspired by American series Curb Your Enthusiasm |
| 2013 | Hum Sab Ajeeb Se Hain | Behtreen friend; International | Aaj Entertainment | | | |
| 2014 | Firaaq | | Hum TV | | | |
| 2014 | Jab We Wed | | Urdu 1 | | | |
| 2015 | Mr. Shamim | Asghar | Hum TV | | | |
| 2017 | Lollipop | | Aaj Entertainment | | | |
| 2017 | Yaqeen Ka Safar | Haroon | Hum TV | | | |
| 2019 | Bandish | Dr. Abhiyaan | ARY Digital | | | |
| 2019 | Dil Toh Bacha Hai | | ARY Digital | | | Telefilm |
| 2021 | Chupke Chupke | Mani | Hum TV | | | Ramadan special |
| 2023 | Teray Aany Se | Ayaz Mamoo | Geo TV | | | |
| 2024 | Tere Mere Sapany | Sikandar Mamu | Geo TV | | | Ramadan special |

== Films ==
| Year | Title | Role | Notes |
|---|---|---|---|
| 2019 | The Donkey King | Rangeela | Animated film |
| 2022 | Ishrat Made in China | Naushad / Chunke | |
| 2022 | Lafangey | Security guard | |
| 2023 | Money Back Guarantee | G.A. Muhajir | |
| 2023 | Babylicious | Mani | |
| 2023 | Teri Meri Kahaniyaan | Shahanshah | |
| 2024 | Na Baligh Afraad | Kashif | |
| 2026 | Zombeid | | |
