= Paristan (TV series) =

Pakistani comedy drama series

- Genre: Drama; Comedy
- Written by: Samra Bukhari
- Directed by: Ali Hassan
- Starring: Arslan Naseer; Aymen Saleem
- Country of origin: Pakistan
- Original language: Urdu
- No. of episodes: 31

Production
- Executive producer: Momina Duraid
- Production location: Karachi, Pakistan
- Production company: MD Productions

Original release
- Network: Hum TV
- Release: 3 April – 3 May 2022

Paristan (transl. Fairyland) is a Pakistani Ramadan special television drama series produced by Momina Duraid under the banner MD Productions, directed by Ali Hassan, and written by Samra Bukhari. It stars Arslan Naseer and Aymen Saleem in lead roles, with an ensemble cast of Javeria Saud, Naveen Waqar, Ali Safina, Mira Sethi, Merub Ali, Junaid Jamshed Niazi, and Asad Siddiqui in supporting roles, and YouTuber, Taimoor Salahuddin in his television debut. It broadcast daily on Hum TV, starting on 3 April 2022.

Paeistaan led ratings with 3-5 TRPs, receiving mixed reviews for its story and acting, except for Sethi's widely praised performance. At the 22nd Lux Style Awards, the series received two nominations and won Best Television Actor (Viewer's choice) for Naseer.

== Plot ==
The story is about a girl whose name is Pernia (nicknamed Pari), her parents died when she was very young, so she lives with her aunt Haseena and uncle Saife Hassan and her sweet cousin Ujala. Pari is a daydreamer, she always dreams of becoming rich and is very bubbly. She is best friends with her neighbour Kamali, who's also funny like her. The family has a maid, named Zubeida, whose mother tongue is Punjabi, and she can do all house chores but cannot cook, so all the cooking is done by Ujala, Ujala is a very kind-hearted and sweet person, who loves Pari like her own sister. Meanwhile Pari's aunt Haseena is a big miser and is always worried about the expenses. The father of the family has a younger sister called Mehreen who doesn't trust men. They have a cute cousin named Babar.

Meanwhile there is another character named Arsam. Arsam was a very happy person living with his brother and his brother's wife and his grandmother (daadi), until his brother and his wife died while coming from a family function in a car crash, afterwards Arsam becomes a strict and cold hearted person, he becomes rude to his brother's children who are very little and naughty. His grandmother tells him to be patient and let go of the past, but he never forgets the past. The family has a servant named Amanullah who's very funny. They shift to their family home next to Pari's home, and this all gives rise to the start of something unique, lively, happy and funny, altogether.

== Cast ==
- Arslan Naseer as Arsam
- Aymen Saleem as Pernia "Pari"
- Javeria Saud as Haseena
- Naveen Waqar as Mehreen
- Ali Safina as Kumail "Kamali"
- Mira Sethi as Zubeida
- Merub Ali as Ujala
- Washma Fatima as Shahzeen
- Junaid Jamshed Niazi as Babar
- Asad Siddiqui as Azar
- Taimoor Salahuddin as Amanullah
- Azra Mansoor as Arsam's Grandmother
- Saima Qureshi as Rukhsar
- Saife Hassan as Ishaq, Haseena's Husband and Ujala's father
- Romaisa Khan

== Production ==
In January 2022, it was revealed that Chupke Chupke couple Aymen Saleem and Arslan Naseer will appear in an upcoming Ramadan series. Besides Saleem and Naseer, Javeria Saud, Naveen Waqar, Mira Sethi, and Ali Safina were also cast in prominent roles. In February, it was reported that YouTuber and content creator, Taimoor Salahuddin, aka Mooroo ,has also joined the cast and is paired opposite Sethi, Mooroo will make his television debut with this series and portray the character that he has co-created with Sethi.

== Soundtrack ==
"Aaja Re"

Song by Asim Azhar
- Released: 17 April 2022
- Length: 4:29
- Label: Hum
- Composer: Naveed Nashad
- Lyricist: Qamar Nashad
- Producer: MD Productions

Music video
- Video on YouTube

== Reception ==
The series received high ratings throughout its run in comparison to its rivals, with TRPs of 3–5 since its inception. With mixed reviews towards the story, the series received poor reviews from critics due to Javeria Saud's performance as Haseena, especially her Punjabi language accent. The News International, however, gave a more favourable review, praised the storyline, and also didn't criticize the Saud's performance, stating, "due to the light-hearted nature of Ramazan dramas, the over-the-top acting works well...". Mira Sethi's performance as Zubeida was however praised.

== Awards and nominations ==
Year	Awards	Category	Nominee	Result	Ref.
2023	Lux Style Awards	Best TV Long Serial	Paristan	Nominated	
2023	Lux Style Awards	Best Television Actor (Viewer's choice)	Arslan Naseer	Won	
