= Sabeena Syed =

Pakistani actress

- سبینہ سید
- Born: 23 August 1997 (age 28); Moscow, Russia
- Education: The Lyceum School, Indus Valley School of Art and Architecture
- Occupations: Actress; Model; Content Creator
- Years active: 2017 –present

Sabeena Syed (Urdu: سبینہ سید) is a Pakistani actress, model and content creator. Syed started her acting career with television serials. Her debut show was Hum TV's romantic drama Yaqeen Ka Safar (2017). She made her film debut with a supporting role in Parwaaz Hai Junoon (2018).

== Early life ==
Syed was born in Moscow and raised in Karachi. She did her A levels at The Lyceum School. She studied Communication design at the Indus Valley School of Art and Architecture.

== Personal life ==
Syed got engaged to actor Khaqan Shahnawaz on December 8, 2025. They got married on January 30, 2026.

== Filmography ==
Key
†	Denotes film/series that have not yet been released

=== Television ===
Year	Title	Role	Network	Notes
2017	Yaqeen Ka Safar	Faryal Rizwan Ali Khan	Hum TV	
2017	Mujhay Jeenay Do	Bushra	Urdu 1	
2020	Muqaddar	Zara	Geo Entertainment	
2021	Yun Tu Hai Pyar Bohut	Sonia	Hum TV	
2021	Juda Huway Kuch Is Tarha	Zara	Hum TV	
2021	Dobaara	Sehar	Hum TV	
2022	Mujhe Pyaar Hua Tha	Anabia	ARY Digital	
2023	Hadsa	Maheen	Geo TV	
2023	Mein	Kashmala Asif	ARY Digital	
2024	Tubelite	Kiran	Express Entertainment	
2025	Ek Jhooti Kahani	Samiya	Hum TV	
2025	Neeli Kothi	Sara	Hum TV	

=== Telefilm ===
Year	Title	Role	Network
2021	Dilruba Cottage	Shabana	ARY Digital

=== Film ===
Year	Title	Role	Notes
2018	Parwaaz Hai Junoon	Diya	
2023	Babylicious	Annie	

=== Music video ===
Year	Title	Artist/Presenter	Notes
2019	O Shabana	Pepsi Battle of the Bands	
2020	Mann Main Tu	Taha G	
2021	Pyar Da Meter	Taha G	
