= Aleezay Rasul =

Pakistani actress

- Born: Aleezay Rasul; Islamabad, Pakistan
- Education: University of Islamabad
- Occupations: Actress; Model
- Years active: 2014 – present

Aleezay Rasul is a Pakistani actress and model. She is known for her roles in dramas Bikhra Mera Naseeb, Saltanat-e-Dil, Bay Dardi and Bandish 2.

== Early life ==
Aleezay was born in Islamabad and completed M.Sc. in Mass Communication from the University of Islamabad. Aleezay then moved to Karachi to start working in dramas.

== Career ==
Aleezay started working as a model for many fashion brands and later she worked in commercials. In 2014 she made her debut as an actress in drama Bikhra Mera Naseeb in which she portrayed the role of Ujala then she appeared in drama Saltanat-e-Dil as Rania. In 2016 she portrayed the role of Nabia in drama Parsai. Then she appeared in dramas Mere Jeevan Sathi, Pujaran and Khilona. Later she appeared in dramas Mera Khuda Janay, Khuwabzaadi, Seherand Bay Dardi. Since then she appeared in dramas Rockstar, Dhoom Dharakka, Tum Kahan Jao Gay and Sirat-e-Mustaqeem. In 2023 she worked in drama Bandish 2 as Isra on ARY Digital later she worked in drama Mein in which she portrayed the role of Asiya. Later she appeared in drama Mujhay Qabool Nahin along with Sami Khan, Madiha Imam and Ahsan Khan.

== Filmography ==
=== Television ===
Year	Title	Role	Network
2014	Bikhra Mera Naseeb	Ujala	Geo TV
2014	Saltanat-e-Dil	Rania	Geo TV
2015	Khilona	Hira	ARY Digital
2016	Parsai	Nabia	A-Plus
2017	Mere Jeevan Sathi	Simran	ARY Digital
2017	Pujaran	Hania	TV One
2018	Mera Khuda Janay	Shahana	Geo Entertainment
2018	Seher	Mishel	PTV
2018	Khuwabzaadi	Raima	TV One
2018	Bay Dardi	Rabia	ARY Digital
2020	Dikhawa Season 1	Saniya	Geo Entertainment
2020	Rockstar	Afsheen	TV One
2021	Oye Motti	Zubi	Express Entertainment
2021	Dhoom Dharakka	Billo Rani	SAB TV
2022	Tum Kahan Jao Gay	Hajra	Express Entertainment
2023	Sirat-e-Mustaqeem	Maria	ARY Digital
2023	Bandish 2	Isra	ARY Digital
2023	Mujhay Qabool Nahin	Shajiha	Geo Entertainment
2023	Mein	Asiya	ARY Digital

=== Film ===
Year	Title	Role	Refe.
2022	Saktaa Kyon Hua	Aiman	
2024	Poppay Ki Wedding	Mooni	
