= Kashmir Beats =

Pakistani television music show

- Directed by: Haris Qadeer
- Country of origin: Pakistan
- Original language: Urdu
- No. of seasons: 2
- No. of episodes: 4+4

Production
- Executive producers: Haris Qadeer and Shany Haider
- Producer: Shany Haider
- Production location: Karachi

Original release
- Network: YouTube (Online); Broadcast syndication (Television); Broadcast syndication (Radio)
- Release: 8 January 2021

Kashmir Beats is a Pakistani television music show which features live studio-recorded music performances by established actors of the industry. The show is another of its kind in Pakistan by Kashmir Cooking Oil. The show features actors as singers. The Idea for the show was initiated by Haris Qadeer who has also directed the show. Shany Haider produced the music for the show. The first episode aired on 8 January 2021.

== Artists ==
Season 1 features performances from the established actors of the industry including Faysal Qureshi, Adnan Siddiqui, Hira Mani, Zara Noor Abbas, Asad Siddiqui, Imran Abbas, Ahsan Khan, Asma Abbas, Kinza Hashmi, Faryal Mehmood, Zhalay Sarhadi and Zubab Rana.

== See also ==
- Music of Pakistan
- Pepsi Battle of the Bands
- Coke Studio
- Nescafé Basement
- Velo Sound Station
- Bisconni Music
- Uth Records
