= Affan Waheed =

Pakistani television actor, model and RJ

- Born: Karachi, Sindh, Pakistan
- Other name: Affan
- Education: National College of Arts
- Occupations: Actor; Model; RJ
- Years active: 2006 – present
- Awards: Ary Digital Awards 2020 (People's Choice Awards )

Affan Waheed (Urdu: عفان وحید) is a Pakistani television actor, model and RJ. He is best known for his roles as Musaf in Aik Pal (2014), Atif in Khamoshi (2017), Shafay in Bay Dardi (2018), and Badar in Do Bol (2019). Waheed made his film debut with the 2024 film Mastaani.

== Early life ==
The third of four siblings, Waheed was born in Karachi where his father, who served in the Pakistan Air Force, was stationed. Because of his father's military career, the family moved frequently and he grew up in different cities (Gujranwala, Islamabad and Sargodha), and eventually settled in Lahore.

== Career ==
A graduate of the National College of Arts, he made his transition from painting to acting in 2006 with a role in Tere Pehlu Mein, and apart from painting and acting, he also writes Urdu poetry and is interested in music as a singer.

== Filmography ==
=== Film ===
| Year | Title | Role | Notes |
|---|---|---|---|
| 2018 | Khana Khud Garam Karo | Manzar | Telefilm |
| 2019 | Shaadi Impossible | Zaid | Telefilm |
| 2021 | Dadi Ka Damad | Zaviyar | Telefilm |
| 2021 | Hangor S-131 | Obaidullah Khan | Telefilm |
| 2024 | Mastaani | Shakil | Debut film |

=== Television series ===
| Year | Title | Role | Network | Notes |
|---|---|---|---|---|
| 2006-2010 | Tere Pehlu Mein | Faaris | | |
| 2010 | Dastaan | Nadir | | |
| 2011 | Kafir | Azaan | | |
| 2011–2012 | Meray Qatil Meray Dildar | Rehaan | | |
| 2012 | Roshan Sitara | Mansoor | | |
| 2013 | Kohar | | | |
| 2013 | Saari Bhool Humari Thi | Abrar | | |
| 2014 | Mein Bushra | Shayaan | | |
| 2014 | Nazdikeeyan | Adeel | | |
| 2014–2015 | Ladoon Mein Pali | Wahaj | | |
| 2014–2015 | Jeena Dushwar Sahi | Hummad | | |
| 2014–2015 | Aik Pal | Musaf | | |
| 2015 | Tumse Mil Kay | Asad | | |
| 2015 | Aye Zindagi | Taimoor | | |
| 2015 | Bheegi Palkein | Umer Khan | | |
| 2015 | Neelam Kinaray | Yaseen | Hum TV | |
| 2015 | Guzaarish | Saad | ARY Digital | |
| 2016 | Rab Raazi | Amanullah | | |
| 2016 | Judaai | Hamza | | |
| 2016 | Hasratein | Salmaan | PTV | |
| 2016–2017 | Meher Aur Meherban | Shahzeb | | |
| 2016–2017 | Tum Milay | Jibran | | |
| 2016–2017 | Bhai | Hammad | | |
| 2017 | Iltija | Sameer | ARY Digital | |
| 2017 | Jannat | Atif | | |
| 2017 | Meherbaan | Daniyal | A Plus Entertainment | |
| 2017 | Ye Ishq Hai | Rehan | | Episode "Khoobsurat" |
| 2017–2018 | Khamoshi | Atif | Hum TV | |
| 2018 | Bay Dardi | Shafay | ARY Digital | |
| 2018 | Kahan Ho Tum | Zaviar | A Plus Entertainment | |
| 2018 | Dukh Kam Na Honge | Jibran | A Plus Entertainment | |
| 2018 | Aik Mohabbat Kaafi Hai | Faris | BOL Dramas | |
| 2019 | Gustakh Dil | Faris | Express Entertainment | |
| 2019 | Do Bol | Badar | ARY Digital | Nominated-Best Actor Critic at Pakistan International Screen Awards |
| 2019 | Bhool | Awais | ARY Digital | |
| 2019 | Mein Na Janoo | Nehat | Hum TV | |
| 2019–2020 | Ghalati | Saad | ARY Digital | |
| 2020 | Mehar Posh | Raashid | Geo Entertainment | Extended cameo |
| 2020-2021 | Kasa-e-Dil | Adan | Geo Entertainment | |
| 2021 | Shehnai | Meerab | ARY Digital | |
| 2021 | Yun Tu Hai Pyar Bohut | Zain | Hum TV | |
| 2021 | Pardes | Ebad | ARY Digital | |
| 2022 | Dil Awaiz | Sikandar | Geo Entertainment | |
| 2023 | Bandish 2 | Sameer | ARY Digital | |
| 2023 | Meher Mah | Rohail | Express Entertainment | |
| 2023 | Dhoka | Hadi | ARY Digital | |
| 2024 | Beyhadh | Hamza | Geo Entertainment | |
| 2024 | Ishq Beparwah | Umer | Green Entertainment | |
| 2025 | Dastakhat | Salman | Hum TV | |
| 2025 | Shar Pasand | Fida | ARY Digital | |
