= Tum Se Hi Talluq Hai =

- Title screen
- Written by: Wasi Shah
- Directed by: Shaquielle Khan
- Starring: Syed Jibran; Tooba Siddiqui; Faryal Mehmood
- Theme music composer: Sahir Ali Bagga
- Opening theme: Nibhalete Wafa Nibhalete; Singer(s); Sahir Ali Bagga; Lyrics by Sahir Ali Bagga
- Country of origin: Pakistan
- Original language: Urdu
- No. of episodes: 27

Production
- Producers: Abdullah Kadwani; Asad Qureshi
- Camera setup: Multi-camera setup
- Production company: 7th Sky Entertainment

Original release
- Network: Geo Entertainment
- Release: 16 July 2018 – 7 January 2019

Related
- Khaani

Tum Se Hi Talluq Hai (Urdu: تم سے ہی تعلق ہے, lit. 'My Only Relation Is With You') is a Pakistani Urdu-language romantic drama series, produced by Asad Qureshi and Abdullah Kadwani under their banner 7th Sky Entertainment. The drama aired on Geo Entertainment every Monday, replacing the drama serial Khaani. It stars Syed Jibran, Tooba Siddiqui and Faryal Mehmood in lead roles.

== Synopsis ==
Our story revolves around the lives of Sadan, Alina and Rama. Sadan is married to his maternal side cousin Alina and has two daughters but he never liked her. Despite all her efforts and attention Sadan could never accept Alina as a life partner. Kulsoom, Sadan's mother is aware of her son's behavior with Alina and also knows about his intention of leaving Alina. To bind her son in marriage Kulsoom transfers all her property in Alina's name and makes it part of her will, after few months Kulsoom departs from this world. Meanwhile, Rama, a colleague from Sadan's office is struggling with her stepfather's illness and career. Sadan likes her and soon Rama will take advantage of Sadan's money and his position however Sadan has done everything for her because he is in love with Rama. Sadan is aware that his mother will never approve of Rama because Alina is from her side of the family. Once his mother dies and he learns about Kulsoom's will he throws Alina out of the house, keeps his daughters and brings Rama in his home.

== Cast ==
- Syed Jibran as Saadan
- Tooba Siddiqui as Alina
- Faryal Mehmood as Rahma
- Shamim Hilaly as Saadan's mother
- Anum Fayyaz as Naina (dead)
- Ali Abbas as Nakheel
- Shabbir Jan as Tahma's step-father
- Nida Mumtaz as Rahma's mother
- Khushi Maheen as younger Sidra
- Arez Ahmed as Ashir

== Soundtrack ==
The original soundtrack of Tum Se Hi Talluq Hai is composed and sang by Sahir Ali Bagga. The song is available on Patari.
