= Babylicious =

2023 Pakistani Urdu language film

- Official teaser poster
- Directed by: Essa Khan
- Written by: Essa Khan
- Produced by: Waqar Zaka; Muzaffar Ahmad Khan; Zohaib Latif; Essa Khan
- Starring: Syra Yousuf; Shehroz Sabzwari; Mani; Ankur Rathee; Sabeena Syed; Aamir Qureshi; Adnan Jaffer
- Cinematography: Zohaib Latif
- Edited by: Swabha Pal
- Music by: Adrian David Emmanuel
- Distributed by: Coconut Films
- Release date: 27 June 2023
- Countries: Bahrain; Pakistan
- Language: Urdu

Babylicious is a 2023 Pakistani romantic comedy film written, directed and produced by Essa Khan under the banner Coconut Entertainment Pakistan. It stars Shehroz Sabzwari and Syra Yousuf, alongside Ankur Rathee and Adnan Jaffar.

Babylicious was released on 27 June 2023, coinciding with Eid al-Adha.

== Premise ==
A hopeless romantic takes on the world to break up his ex-girlfriend's wedding and win her back.

== Cast ==
- Shehroz Sabzwari as Omar
- Syra Yousuf as Sabiha
- Ankur Rathee as Nabeel
- Shehzeen Rahat as Arwa
- Adeal Amjad as Aadi
- Mohi Abro as Nido
- Sabeena Syed as Annie
- Adnan Jaffar as Dad
- Laila Wasti as Mom
- Aamir Qureshi as Haris
- Anita Camphor as Sabiha's mother
- Mani as Mani
- Pippa Hughes as Sarah

== Production ==
The film was officially announced by Syra Yousuf and Shahroz Sabzwari on Valentine's Day post on Instagram in 2018, when they posted a BTS from their then untitled film. In an interview, Yousuf stated that she committed to the project after listening to the film's soundtrack.

Principal photography of the film commenced in 2018. The first schedule took place in Karachi, before moving to Bahrain. The film was slated for a possible Eid release in 2019, but due to delays in filming and the COVID-19 pandemic, the film's release was postponed.

== Marketing ==
The title of the film was announced on 15 December 2022, along with a first look. The official teaser was released online by Coconut Entertainment on 22 December 2022 to rave reviews. The Express Tribune described Babylicious' teaser "as sweet as one romantic film can be".

The official film trailer was released on 11 January 2023.

- Babylicious Trailer & Songs
- Official trailer on YouTube
- Official Video of Ghazab Kurriye on YouTube
- Official Video of Mann Ranjhan on YouTube

== Music and soundtrack ==
The film album is primarily composed by Adrian David.

The first single, titled "Mann Ranjhan", was released on 30 December 2022. Pop culture website Something Haute hailed the song "a memorable addition to the list of melodious love songs from Pakistani films."

The second single, titled "Ghazab Kurriye", accompanied by its music video was released on 14 February 2023. The music video of the song made waves for its production design, costumes and choreography with more than one publication labeling it the wedding anthem of the year. The music is produced by Kashan Admani. The complete soundtrack was released on 21 May 2023, receiving positive reviews from the critics. Babylicious' songs are based on love, passion, and longing.

Movie Tracks
No.	Title	Writer	Artist	Length
1.	Mann Ranjhan	Shakeel Sohail	Nauman Shafi, Rahma Ali	3:50
2.	Ghazab Kurriye	Shakeel Sohail	Jonita Gandhi, Ahmed Jahanzeb	2:54
3.	Ussay Jee Raha Hoon	Shakeel Sohail	Sherry Khattak, Maria Unera	4:50
4.	Ranjhay Ko Na De Saza	Shakeel Sohail	Asad Rasheed	4:30
5.	Alvida	Shakeel Sohail	Richie Robinson	3:35

== Release ==
The film was initially scheduled to release on 10 February 2023. However it is now postponed to 27 June 2023, coinciding with the Eid festival.

== Critical reception ==
The film received a number of positive reviews upon its release. Majorly the critics praised the work of the director, Omer Essa Khan. Shahroz, and the ear-catching dialogues, are the glue that bind Essa’s uncomplicated, routine love story, that’s anted-up as a near-excellent motion picture. Despite some very minor creative and technical hitches — hitches casual audiences won’t even note — Babylicious heralds the arrival of a bright young filmmaker, wrote Dawn (newspaper). The roles of the lead cast were also lauded by the publications including The Tribune.

== See also ==
- List of Pakistani films of 2023
