= Tooba Siddiqui =

Pakistani model and actress

- Born: 7 August 1984 (age 41); Karachi, Pakistan
- Occupations: Actress; Model
- Years active: 2001-present
- Spouse: Sohail (m. 2011)

Tooba Siddiqui (Urdu: طوبیٰ صدیقی) is a Pakistani actress and model. Siddiqui started her career by starring in a music video "My Love" for pop singer Yasir Akhtar. She began modeling for the Pakistani fashion industry in the early 2000s. She has appeared in campaigns for Deevees and Diva. After a break from acting, Tooba returned to the screen for the hit thriller series Dushman-e-Jaan.

== Personal life ==
She is married and has two children, a son and a daughter.

== Television ==
Year	Title	Role	Notes
2009–10	Bol Meri Machli	Noreen	
2010	Dil Hai Chota Sa	Kehkeshan "Kuku"	
2010	Noor Bano	Alvina	
2010	Mujhe Hai Hukm-e-Azaan	Simran	
2011	Kitni Girhain Baaki Hain	Ainy	Episode 3
2012	Pal May Ishq Pal May Nahi	Pari	
2017	Iltija	Hina	
2018	Tum Se Hi Talluq Hai	Alina	
2020	Dushman e Jaan	Ramsha Farooqui	
2021	Khuda Aur Muhabbat (season 3)	Romana	
2023	Jurm	Samia	
2023	Gumn	Maya Malik	Co-writer and co-producer also

== Film ==
Year	Title	Role	Notes
	Ajnabe Shehr Mein		
2015	Wrong No.	special appearance in song 'Nachey Mann'	
2016	Dobara Phir Se	Natasha	

== Accolades ==
=== Modeling awards ===
Year	Ceremony	Category	Result	Ref(s).
2006	Lux Style Awards	Best Model of the Year (female)	Won	
2007	Lux Style Awards	Best Model of the Year (female)	Nominated	
2008	Lux Style Awards	Best Dressed Celebrity (female)	Won	

=== Acting awards ===
Year	Ceremony	Category	Project	Result	Ref(s).
2018	Lux Style Awards	Best Supporting Actress (Film)	Dobara Phir Se	Nominated	
2021	Pakistan International Screen Awards	Best Supporting Actress (TV)	Dushman e Jaan	Nominated	

== See also ==
- List of Pakistani actresses
