= Agha Talal =

Pakistani actor

- Born: Agha Talal
- Known for: Pakistani television actor.
- Notable work: Yaqeen Ka Safar Noor (2018), Soya Mera Naseeb (2019) and Chamak Damak (2020).

Agha Talal is a Pakistani television actor. He made his debut with Hum TV's 2017 drama series Yaqeen Ka Safar and also appeared in lead roles in Noor (2018), Soya Mera Naseeb (2019) and Chamak Damak (2020).

== Filmography ==
=== Television ===
Year	Title	Role	Notes
2017	Yaqeen Ka Safar	Kamran	
2017	Malkin		
2018	Masoom		
2018	Noor	Jalal	
2018	Ru Baru Ishq Tha	Fawad	
2018—2019	Khudparast		
2019	Soya Mera Naseeb	Muneeb	
2019	Mehboob Aapke Qadmon Main	Shehryar	
2020	Munafiq	Zohaib	
2020	Raaz-e-Ulfat		
2020	Chamak Damak	Humayun	
2021	Teri Behisi	Asad	
2021	Badnaseeb	Amjad	
2022	Ibn-e-Hawwa	Shakoor	
2022	Ant Ul Hayat	Furqan	
2023	Jaan e Jahan	Kabir	

=== Telefilm ===
Year	Title	Role	Notes
2021	1970: A Love Story		
