= Samina Humayun Saeed =

Pakistani producer

- Born: Pakistan
- Occupation: Producer
- Spouse: Humayun Saeed (m. 1995)

Samina Humayun Saeed (Urdu: ثمینہ ہمایوں سعید) is a Pakistani TV drama producer. She is best known for producing drama serials such as Kuch Pyar Ka Pagalpan, Kaash Main Teri Beti Na Hoti, Akbari Asghari, Sadqay Tumhare, Mann Mayal and Alif under her banner Next Level Entertainment. She won the Hum Award for Best Drama Serial Popular award at 3rd Hum Awards for producing Sadqay Tumhare. Samina is married to actor Humayun Saeed.

== Filmography ==
- Kuch Pyar Ka Pagalpan
- Kaash Main Teri Beti Na Hoti
- Maseeha
- Daddy
- Mehmoodabad Ki Malkain
- Akbari Asghari
- Sadqay Tumhare
- Khuda Mera Bhi Hai
- Mann Mayal
- Do Bol
- Amanat
- Alif
