= Mere Khudaya =

Television series

- Written by: Samina Aijaz
- Directed by: Shahood Alvi
- Presented by: idream entertainment
- Starring: Saboor Aly; Shahood Alvi; Zubab Rana; Sajida Syed; Salma Hassan
- Country of origin: Pakistan
- Original language: Urdu
- No. of episodes: 26

Production
- Production locations: Karachi, Pakistan
- Running time: 40 minutes

Original release
- Network: ARY Digital
- Release: 23 June – 15 December 2018

Mere Khudaya (Urdu: میرے خدایا, lit. 'My God') is a Pakistani drama serial that aired on ARY Digital in 2018. It is written by Samina Aijaz and directed by Shahood Alvi. It is produced by Abdullah Seja under their production banner Idream Entertainment.

== Cast ==
- Saboor Aly as Mehak
- Shahood Alvi as Sajid
- Zubab Rana as Aleena
- Hassan Niazi as Qasim
- Paras Masroor as Kashif; Aleena's brother
- Sajida Syed
- Salma Hassan
- Shaheen Khan as Aleena's mother
- Sohail Asghar as Zahid; Mehak's father
- Shaista Jabeen

== Awards and nominations ==
Year	Award	Category	Recipient(s)	Result	Ref.
2019	ARY Digital- Social Media Drama Awards 2018	Best Drama Serial -2018	Mere Khudaya	Nominated	
2019	ARY Digital- Social Media Drama Awards 2018	Best Actor Female (Serial)	Saboor Ali	Nominated	
2019	ARY Digital- Social Media Drama Awards 2018	Best Newcomer (Female)	Zubab Rana	Nominated	
2019	ARY Digital- Social Media Drama Awards 2018	Best Negative Actor (Male)	Shahood Alvi	Nominated	
2019	ARY Digital- Social Media Drama Awards 2018	Best Negative Actor (Female)	Zubab Rana	Nominated	
2019	Lux Style Awards	Best Emergening TV Talent	Zubab Rana	Nominated	
