= Bandish (franchise) =

Pakistani television series

- بندش
- Genre: Action; Horror drama
- Created by: Fahad Mustafa
- Written by: Syed Nabeel; Shahid Nizami
- Directed by: Aabis Raza
- Theme music composer: SK Salman Khan
- Composer: SK Salman Khan
- Country of origin: Pakistan
- Original language: Urdu
- No. of seasons: 2
- No. of episodes: Season 1: 28; Season 2: 32

Production
- Producers: Fahad Mustafa; Ali Kazmi
- Camera setup: Single-camera setup
- Production company: Big Bang Entertainment

Original release
- Network: ARY Digital
- Release: 21 January 2019 – 16 December 2023

Related
- Balaa

Bandish (Urdu: بندش, lit. "Restriction") is a Pakistani supernatural horror drama series co-produced by Fahad Mustafa and Ali Kazmi under Big Bang Entertainment and directed by Aabis Raza. Spanning over two seasons, the first season features Marina Khan, Sajid Hassan, Hira, Mani, Zubab Rana and Zainab Ahmed as leads whilst Farah Shah plays the main antagonist. It was first aired on 21 January 2019 on ARY Digital. It tells the story of a woman named Sumbul, who after being bullied in university and being rejected and made fun of by her crush Junaid, many years later, turns to black magic and sorcery to cast evil spells on Junaid and his family, which consists of a wife and three daughter. The second season premiered on 28 April 2023 with Areej Mohyuddin, Affan Waheed, Amna Ilyas, Shuja Asad, Sania Saeed and Zainab Qayyum.

== Series overview ==
Season	No. of episodes	Originally broadcast (Pakistan)	
Season	No. of episodes	First aired	Last aired
1	28	21 January 2019	22 April 2019
2	32	28 April 2023	16 December 2023

== Seasons ==
=== Season 1 ===
The show originally aired in 2019. It was a hit and received praise from critics.

The first season tells the story of a woman named Sumbul, who after being bullied in University and being rejected and made fun of by her crush Junaid, many years later, turns to black magic and sorcery to cast evil spells on Junaid and his family, which consists of a wife and three daughter.

=== Season 2 ===
The show was renewed for a sequel in May 2020 but was delayed due to Covid-19.

In August 2022, the shooting began with Aamna Ilyas, Affan Waheed, Shuja Asad, Sania Saeed and Zainab Qayyum finalized for playing pivotal roles in the show.

In October 2022, the shooting ended and the post-production work began which was completed by November-End and the series was launched in April 2023.

It tells the story of a family who witnesses paranormal activities as they return to their old home.

== Cast ==
=== Season 1 ===
- Sajid Hasan as Junaid; Madiha's husband
- Marina Khan as Madiha; Junaid's wife, Sania and Hania's mother
- Hira Salman as Sania; Madiha and Junaid's elder daughter
- Salman Saqib Sheikh as Dr.Abhiyaan; Sania's love interest
- Zubab Rana as Hania; Madiha and Junaid's 2nd daughter, Sania's sister
- Farah Shah as Sumbul; Tantric (Black magic specialist)
- Zainab Ahmed as Sandal; Junaid's secretary, later married Junaid
- Hoorain as Aleena (Child); Madiha and Junaid's younger daughter, Sania and Hania's sister
- Fahad Shaikh as Hamza; Love interest of Hania
- Khalid Zafar as Izhaan; Hamza's father, Religious scholar
- Arsala Siddiqui as Hamza's sister, Izhaan's daughter
- Birjees Farooqui as Hamza's mother

=== Season 2 ===
- Affan Waheed as Sameer
- Amna Ilyas as Wania
- Sania Saeed as Humera
- Wajeeha Khan as Rabail
- Zainab Qayyum as Farhana
- Areej Mohyudin as Minahil
- Hoorain Lyka Ali as Hoorain
- Shuja Asad as Ahmer
- Sabahat Ali Bukhari as Samina
- Faraz Farooqui as Armaan
- Hina Rizvi as Jameela
- Aleezay Rasul as Isra
- Salahuddin Tunio as Baba Sahab; Tantric (Black Magic Specialist)
- Anees Alam as Shouqat

== Reception ==
The drama was praised due to its unique storyline and thrilling performances by the whole cast. It was one of the most popular dramas of 2019 and was widely appreciated. A second season is currently on air.

== Soundtrack ==
Bandish - OST

Soundtrack album by Abbas Ali Khan
- Released: 3 April 2019
- Recorded: 2019
- Genre: Television soundtrack
- Length: (3:20)
- Language: Urdu
- Label: ARY Digital

Music video
- "Bandish" OST on YouTube

The title song was sung and composed by Abbas Ali Khan and the lyrics were written by Ali Imran.
