= Bay Dardi =

- بے دردی
- Written by: Shagufta Bhatti
- Directed by: Ahmed Bhatti
- Starring: Affan Waheed; Aiman Khan; Bushra Ansari
- Theme music composer: Waqar Ali
- Country of origin: Pakistan
- Original language: Urdu
- No. of seasons: 1
- No. of episodes: 28

Production
- Producer: Abdullah Seja
- Camera setup: Multi-camera setup
- Production company: Idream Entertainment

Original release
- Network: ARY Digital
- Release: 26 March – 27 August 2018

Baydardi (Urdu: بے دردی, lit. 'Cruelty') is a Pakistani drama television series aired on ARY Digital from 26 March 2018. It features Aiman Khan and Affan Waheed and is produced by Abdullah Seja of Idream Entertainment.

== Summary ==
The series deals with the issue of HIV/AIDS, mostly thought as taboo in Pakistani society. Aiman Khan plays the lead role of Biya, a person with HIV/AIDS who gets infected by Shafay (her husband) and the difficulties she faces after her marriage as nobody blames Shafay but Biya and questions her character due to her being HIV positive.

== Plot ==
Bia and Rabia are two sisters living with their brother Nasir and his wife, Rabia goes to university and Bia goes to a college. Rabia is in love with a boy named Rohail. Rohail is a flirt and dishonest person, unknown to Rabia. Rohail does drugs, other bad things, and has HIV/AIDS. His roommate and friend Shafay tells Rohail to stop these bad habits and to think about his poor parents and to stop this drug stuff and all, he does not know about HIV / AIDS on Rohail. One day, Bia and Shafay were travelling on the same bus as Rohail having used Shafay's car. Shafay forgot his money, so Bia, a stranger, pays rent for him. The next day, Shafay does the same, but declines the money saying he doesn't need charity. Soon, Shafay falls in love with her. Meanwhile, Rohail and Shafay due to staying in the same room, exchanges their clothes, foods and even razor which lead Shafay to being involved in the same disease (HIV). Later Shafay gets fed up of Rohail and leaves the flat in which they both were staying and goes back to his house. Only his mom and his only lovable maternal uncle stays there. Soon Shafay's health starts to deteriorate and his mother insists his checkup, only to find out of her son having Aids and concealing it from him. Rohail being upset, betraying Rabia and upsetting Shafay spends his days in the flat depressed and only contacts Shafay on the phone, as we see his health deteriorating too. Rabia also commits suicide because of Rohais betrayal as she was now unable to face her family, leaving Bia deeply grieved and blaming Rohail and Shafay for her sister's death. Shafay's mother decides on making her son's last days by keeping him happy and tracks down Bia and asking for her hand by her brother, however at first she denied Shafay's idea of marrying her due to her lower class. However Shafay's uncle is angry on the mothers decision but still both keep the Aids a secret. After Bia expects her first child, HIV+ status is revealed. She realizes this but is threatened to keep her mouth shut. Her behavior towards Shafay gets colder, but Shafay has no idea why is it so. Rohail soon turns to a hospital for his treatment, and learns about his disease. His health deteriorates day by day. Soon Shafay finds out Bia's reports about her having Aids and blames her for being a characterless woman. His mother pretends to be unaware and Bia leaves the house hurt. She is about to hit a train when an old man saves her, who turns out to be Rohail's father, that Bia doesn't know. Bia spends her days at their house becoming their daughter, as non of them knew that she was their sons friends wife. On the other hand, Shafay's uncle screams out that Bia had AIDS because of Shafay, and depressed Shafay gets on with finding Bia. Rohails dies in the hospital claiming that Shafay is a pure charactered person who never did anything wrong. He also learns that due to him using his razor, Shafay had AIDS. Before dying, he writes his last will for Shafay to go to his parents and tell them about his death. Shafay does the same and goes to their house. Upon hearing Shafay's voice in the sitting room, Bia sneaks out of the house and runs to her brothers home. She meets Shafay's mother over there, who was there to take Bia home. Upon blurting out everything, Bia's brother asks Shafay's mother to leave and carries on with his sister's treatment. Shafay finally is able to convince Bia to come home and they both reconcile, spending their last days together happily and building hope for each other. Rohails parents grieve deeply on their sons death and cry bitterly on his grave. Finally, Shafay and Bia are hospitalized together, while Shafay takes a promise from Bia, for making him the first person to see the baby's face when it is born. The baby born is a girl who is taken to Shafay, who kisses and sees the baby's face. Shafay's uncle gives the prayer call in both the baby's ears and as soon as the prayer call finishes, Shafay dies. In the end we see Shafay's mother running an awareness about Aids / HIV on the television. Shafay's and Bia's daughter has grown up into a six-year-old. Rohail's parents have started teaching the Qu'ran to little children at their house. And the last scene closes with Shafay's mother, uncle and daughter Maryam visiting the couple's grave.The grave of Bia reveals that she died a year after Shafay's death.

== Cast ==
- Aiman Khan as Biya
- Affan Waheed as Shafay
- Bushra Ansari as Memona: Shafay's mother
- Behroze Sabzwari as Tabrez: Shafay's Uncle and Memona's Brother
- Kashif Mehmood as Nasir: Rabia and Biya's brother
- Sana Fakhar as Tabinda: Nasir's wife
- Aleezay Rasul as Rabia: Nasir and Biya's sister
- Arsalan Faisal as Rohail
- Aqeel Abbas as Salman: Tabinda's brother
- Anam Tanveer as Dr. Ayesha
- Fahad Rehmani as Nazeer
- Mustafa Iqbal as Dr. Hamza
- Fajar Khan as Soniya: Shafay and Rohail's class fellow

== International broadcast ==
In the Arab world, it was premiered on the subscription channel MBC Bollywood under the title صراح القدر.

== Reception ==
The series was praised for its approach of the topic of AIDS.

== Awards and nominations ==
Year	Award	Category	Recipient(s)	Result	Ref.
2019	ARY Digital- Social Media Drama Awards 2018	Best Drama Serial -2018	Bay Dardi	Nominated	
2019	ARY Digital- Social Media Drama Awards 2018	Best Actor Male (Serial)	Affan Waheed	Nominated	
2019	ARY Digital- Social Media Drama Awards 2018	Best Actor Female (Serial)	Aiman Khan	Nominated	
2019	ARY Digital- Social Media Drama Awards 2018	Best Negative Actor (Female)	Bushra Aansari	Nominated	
2019	ARY Digital- Social Media Drama Awards 2018	Best Couple	Affan Waheed and Aiman Khan	Won	
2019	ARY Digital- Social Media Drama Awards 2018	Best OST	Bay Dardi	Nominated	
2019	ARY Digital- Social Media Drama Awards 2018	Best Director	Ahmed Bhatti	Nominated	
2019	ARY Digital- Social Media Drama Awards 2018	Best Script Writer	Shagufta Bhatti	Nominated	
