= Wabaal =

2022 Pakistani TV series

- Urdu: وَبال
- Genre: Drama; Mystery
- Written by: Qaisra Hayat
- Directed by: Amin Iqbal
- Starring: Sarah Khan; Talha Chahour; Shagufta Ejaz; Merub Ali
- Country of origin: Pakistan
- Original language: Urdu
- No. of episodes: 26

Production
- Executive producer: Momina Duraid
- Producer: Momina Duraid
- Production company: MD Productions

Original release
- Network: Hum TV
- Release: 3 September 2022 – 26 February 2023

Wabaal (Urdu: وبال, lit. 'calamity') is a 2022 Pakistani television series produced by Momina Duraid for Hum TV under banner MD Productions. It is directed by Amin Iqbal and written by Qaisra Hayat. The series stars Sarah Khan and Talha Chahour in leading roles. Wabaal's story revolves around the practice of Riba (usury) and the want for riches. The first episode of the series aired on 3 September 2022.

== Plot ==
Anum is an over-ambitious girl who wants a luxurious life by any means at all. This is the story of the errors of judgement that she makes in life.

== Cast ==
- Sarah Khan as Anum
- Talha Chahour as Faraz
- Merub Ali as Maham
- Shagufta Ejaz as Shagufta
- Saleem Sheikh as Shakir
- Tara Mahmood as Rahat
- Nida Khan as Neha
- Mohammad Hunbal as Naveed, Shagufta's son
- Raza Ali Abid as Gul Khan
- Sabiha Hashmi as Shakir's mother
- Kinza Malik as Faraz's mother
- Sachal Afzal as Hammad
- Hareem Sohail as Zarqa
- Salma Qadir as Zarqa's mother
- Sohail Masood as Zarqa's father
- Hira Sheikh as Farzana
- Tasneem Ansari as Shamim

== Production ==
In early July 2022, it was rumoured that Sarah Khan and Talha Chahour of Jo Bichar Gaye fame would play the leading roles in Amin Iqbal's directional and Qaisra Hayat's written, which was confirmed at the end of month. The first teaser of the series was released on 10 August 2022.
