= Zubab Rana =

Pakistani television actress

- زباب رانا
- Born: Zubab Fatima; Shahdara, Lahore, Punjab, Pakistan
- Occupations: Actress; Model
- Years active: 2017 – present

Zubab Rana is a Pakistani television actress. She is known for her role as Aleena in Mere Khudaya and as Hania in Bandish, the former of which earned her a nomination for Best Emerging Talent at the Lux Style Awards. In 2024, she was part of the cast in the drama Khudsar. Her character, Shazma, is shown as very selfish, rude and jealous. She lost her father, Rana Maqbool Hussain, in August 2021 at Lahore due to COVID-19.

== Career ==
Rana made her acting debut with a role in the Hum TV series Naseebo Jali (2017). She further appeared as an antagonist in the social series Mere Khudaya (2018) and as a protagonist in horror series Bandish (2019). For her performance as Aleena (antagonist) in Mere Khudaya, she received a nomination for Best Emerging Talent at the 18th Lux Style Awards.

In April 2022, Actress Zubab Rana is receiving backlash on social media for a statement that some found to be offensive.

== Filmography ==
=== Television ===
Year	Title	Role	Network	Notes
2017-2018	Naseebon Jali	Taniya	Hum TV	Debut
2018	Mere Khudaya	Aleena	ARY Digital	Negative Role
2019	Bandish	Hania	ARY Digital	
2019	Rishtay Biktay Hain	Zeba	ARY Digital	
2019-2020	Mehboob Aapke Kadmon Main	Sunaina	Hum TV	
2020-2021	Fitrat	Rafiya	Geo Entertainment	
2020-2021	Bharaas	Kiran Hassan	ARY Digital	Negative Role
2022	Ishq Pagal Karay	Rania	TV One Pakistan	
2022	Woh Pagal Si	Shazma Ahsan Hayat (nee Mazhar Hussain)	ARY Digital	Negative Role
2023	Behroop	Falak	Geo Entertainment	
2023	101 Talaqain	Anum	Green Entertainment	
2024	Khudsar	Shazma	ARY Digital	Negative Role
2024	Chaal	Rubab	Geo Entertainment	
2025	Sauda	TBA	Express Entertainment	

=== Anthology series ===
Year	Title	Role	Network	Notes
2022	Makafaat (TV series)	Anam	Geo Entertainment	Episode "Beqasoor"

=== Short film ===
Year	Title	Role	Network	Notes
2021	Twisted Sapnay	Nasreen (maid)	Elements Prime	Short Film

=== Music video ===
Year	Title	Artist	Notes
2018	Vichora	Rahat Fateh Ali Khan	ISPR
2020	Ye Watan Tumhara Hai	Shany Haider	
2021	Teri Photo	Shany Haider	Kashmir Beats

== Awards and nominations ==
Year	Work	Award	Category	Result	Ref.
2018	Naseebon Jali	6th Hum Awards	Best Soap Actress	Nominated	
2019	Mere Khudaya	18th Lux Style Awards	Best Emerging Talent	Nominated	
2019	Mere Khudaya	ARY Digital- Social Media Drama Awards 2018	Best Negative Actor (Female)	Nominated	
2019	Mere Khudaya	ARY Digital- Social Media Drama Awards 2018	Best Newcomer (Female)	Nominated	
