= Dilfareb =

- Genre: Family drama
- Written by: Zafar Mairaj
- Directed by: Amin Iqbal
- Starring: Omair Rana; Mira Sethi; Saba Hameed; Alia Butt
- Country of origin: Pakistan
- Original language: Urdu
- No. of episodes: 23

Production
- Producer: A&B Entertainment
- Production location: Pakistan
- Running time: Approx 40 Minutes

Original release
- Network: Geo Entertainment
- Release: 22 May – 9 August 2015

Dilfareb (English; Seductive) is a 2015 Pakistani drama serial directed by Amin Iqbal, and written by Zafar Mairaj. The drama stars Omair Rana, Mira Sethi and Alia Butt in lead roles, and first aired on Geo Entertainment from 22 May 2015 on every Friday, Saturday and Sunday at 8:00 p.m. The story revolves around the love triangle of a charming young man Zain, Dr. Gul Bakht and Natasha.

== Plot ==
Zain (Omair Rana) has been in search of a soulmate for quite long. When he meets Natasha (Alia Butt), he thinks he has finally met the girl of his dreams. Soon he finds that she tricked him by giving him wrong contact details. He loses hope of finding her again and fate introduces him to Dr. Gul Bakht (Mira Sethi), whom he proposes to due to his mom’s wish.

The twist in the story comes when Zain crosses paths with the bubbly Mashal as she is Dr. Gul Bakht’s friend. He is surprisingly attracted towards her, and is convinced that she is his true soulmate. This intense love triangle is mixed with happiness, love, disappointment and jealousy.

== Cast ==
- Omair Rana as Zain
- Mira Sethi as Gul Bakht
- Alia Butt as Natasha
- Saba Hameed as Zain's mother
- Ameesha Butt
- Zainab Qayyum
- Ghulam Mohiuddin as Natasha's father
- Jana Malik
