= Meri Teri Kahani =

Pakistani television series

- Genre: Sitcom
- Created by: Mani Essa
- Directed by: Hassan Saquib
- Starring: Hira Salman; Salman Saqib Sheikh
- Country of origin: Pakistan
- Original language: Urdu
- No. of seasons: 2

Production
- Producer: Coconut Productions
- Production locations: Karachi, Sindh
- Camera setup: Multi-camera
- Running time: 18-22 minutes

Original release
- Release: 2013 – 2014

Meri Teri Kahani (Urdu: میری تیری کہانی, lit. 'The Story of Me and You') is a Pakistani sitcom created by television host Mani and produced by Coconut Pakistan Productions. It originally aired on ARY Digital in 2013 for one season and then on HUM Network for an additional season in 2014. The show stars celebrity couple Mani and Hira as fictionalized versions of themselves. Meri Teri Kahani was noted for having the highest production value in its genre in Pakistan and for high appreciation among its target audiences of upper and middle classes.

== History ==
Originally Mani and ARY Digital CEO Jerjees Seja wanted to develop a sitcom inspired by Curb Your Enthusiasm. Essa Khan was approached to further develop the idea and write the pilot script. The concept lacked appeal for Khan who was looking to direct a serial. He came on board on the condition that he be allowed to work further on the concept. Khan focused the show more on the personal and social interactions of a married couple. The pilot script was approved in 2012, but production was delayed by a year due to cast member Hira Salman's pregnancy. Finally, the sitcom aired on 17 April 2013, the same date as the main stars’ wedding anniversary.

== Plot ==
The sitcom focuses on a penny-pinching TV star hitting middle age and his gaudy wife struggling with baby fat as they deal with everything from humorous daily minutiae to major struggles. Out of the 40 episodes, some of the subplots lines were: Wedding Anniversary: Hira wishes for her husband to get a tattoo on his arm for her and Mani wishes for his wife to not lose her temper for a week. However it becomes extremely difficult for both to oblige each other for their special day. Morning Show: On a TV morning show Mani embarrasses Hira by failing a quiz about her likes and dislikes. Not willing to let the humiliation pass, Hira books their presence on a more popular show where Mani again will be quizzed about her. Mani is faced with the biggest mental challenge and contemplates cheating.

School Admission: Mani and Hira wish to enroll their child in an English Medium school but are rejected on the basis that their English is poor. Hira decides to hire a tutor to learn the language much to Mani's annoyance who already is finding it difficult to discipline their son. Half Sleeves: At someone's quip, Mani becomes uncomfortable with Hira wearing half sleeves. He tries numerous ways of getting her to wear full sleeves without coming across as conservative. Finally, after convincing Hira to try a veil, he gets caught eyeing girls in sleeveless. From there erupts a tussle between the two on who can embarrass the other more with their outfits in public. The Maid: Inspired by her friends, Hira pays a three-month deposit for a Filipino maid. But what she gets is one from Sri Lanka. And who later is discovered is not even from Sri Lanka but from Bihar colony. Mani wants his deposit back from the agency. But the agency guy becomes successful in causing a rift between the couple.

== Cast ==
Note: All the cast members played fictionalized versions of themselves

- Hira Mani as Hira
- Salman Saqib Sheikh as Mani
- Wajahat Rauf as Wajahat; Episode 4
- Hina Altaf as Hina; Episode 18
- Nida Yasir as Nida; Episode 18

== Reception ==
The show received generally positive feedback with some celebrities openly terming it the smartest sitcom in the subcontinent. Celebrities like Waqar Zaka, Danish Nawaz, Mathira and Nida Yasir welcomed the opportunity to appear on the show as guest actors playing themselves. The official social media sites for the show have several thousand likes with YouTube views exceeding 50,000 per episode.
