= Mohabbat Na Kariyo =

- Written by: Samina Ejaz
- Directed by: Syed Ahmed Kamran
- Starring: Hira Mani; Junaid Khan; Zarnish Khan
- Opening theme: Mohabbat Na Kariyo by Hadiqa Kiani
- Country of origin: Pakistan
- Original language: Urdu
- No. of episodes: 27

Production
- Producer: Hassan Zia
- Production locations: Karachi, Sindh; The Netherlands
- Camera setup: Multi-camera setup
- Running time: approx. 40 minutes
- Production company: Mastermind Productions

Original release
- Network: Geo Entertainment
- Release: 11 October 2019 – 20 March 2020

Mohabbat Na Kariyo (Urdu: محبت نہ کریو, transl. Don't ever fall in Love) earlier titled Makafaat is a 2019 Pakistani romantic drama television series produced by master mind productions . It features Hira Mani, Zarnish Khan and Junaid Khan in their second on-screen appearance together after Sun Yaara. It also has Atiqa Odho, Ali Ansari and Mariyam Nafees in supporting roles. It was first aired on 11 October 2019 on Geo Entertainment.

== Cast ==
- Junaid Khan as Asad
- Hira Mani as Zara
- Zarnish Khan as Rabia
- Atiqa Odho as Tasneem, Asad's mother
- Ali Ansari as Asad's cousin
- Mariyam Nafees as Nida, Asad's sister
- salman Faisal as Nida's husband
- Farah Nadir as Nida's mother-in-law
- Mehmood Akhtar as Zara's father
- Shaheen Khan as Zara's mother

== Production ==
The series was earlier titled Makafaat but makers changed it to Mohabbat Na Kariyo to avoid any confusion with the series Makafaat.
