= Jab We Wed =

2014 Pakistani television series

- Promotional poster
- Genre: Comedy, Romance
- Written by: Mohsin Ali
- Directed by: Wajahat Rauf; Mohsin Ali
- Starring: Danish Taimoor; Ayeza Khan; Bushra Ansari; Nimra Khan; Hira Salman
- Country of origin: Pakistan
- Original language: Urdu
- No. of seasons: 1
- No. of episodes: 23

Production
- Editor: Hassan Ali Khan
- Camera setup: Multi-camera setup
- Running time: 32 minutes

Original release
- Network: Urdu 1
- Release: 29 July – 20 December 2014

Jab We Wed (Urdu: جب ووئی ویڈ; transl. When we wed) is a Pakistani romantic comedy drama serial directed by Wajahat Rauf and written by Mohsin Ali. The drama stars Danish Taimoor and Ayeza Khan in the lead roles. It first aired on Urdu 1 on the occasion of Eid al-Fitr 2014.

Jab We Wed was also broadcast on the Indian channel Zindagi from 18 December 2015, airing every Monday to Saturday at 8:30 pm (IST) under the same title.

== Plot ==
Faris (Danish Taimoor) is told by his mother (Bushra Ansari) that her dying wish is for him to marry one of his aunt's daughters. Accompanied by his best friend and confidante Nisa (Ayeza Khan), Faris sets out to find the right girl. From the fashion world of Karachi to the towns of Punjab, the journey proves to be far more than either of them anticipated. Faris eventually realises his feelings for Nisa and proposes to her on her wedding day to Zero. Nisa accepts, and the two marry. The serial concludes with a dance performance by the full cast to the title track.

== Cast ==
- Danish Taimoor as Faris Kapur
- Ayeza Khan as Nisa Mehra
- Bushra Ansari as Faris's mother
- Nimra Khan as Rumi
- Hira Mani as Heer
- Fizza Zehra as Nazuk
- Tipu Shareef as Raanjha
- Seemi Pasha as Rumi's mother
- Shehryar Zaidi as Rumi's father
- Hashim Butt as Heer's father
- Humaira Ali as Heer's mother
- Birjees Farooqui as Amma Ji
- Furqan Qureshi as Zero
- Rameez Siddiqui as Loosey
- Aqdas Ghaffar as Rida

== Soundtrack ==
"Jab We Wed"

Song by Sahir Ali Bagga
- Language: Urdu, English
- Recorded: Wajahat Rauf & Mohsin Ali
- Genre: Theme song
- Length: 3:24
- Composer: Sahir Ali Bagga
- Lyricist: Mohsin Ali

Music video
- "Jab We Wed" OST on YouTube

The original soundtrack of Jab We Wed is composed and performed by Sahir Ali Bagga.
