= Hira Mani =

Pakistani actress

Hira Mani حرا مانی
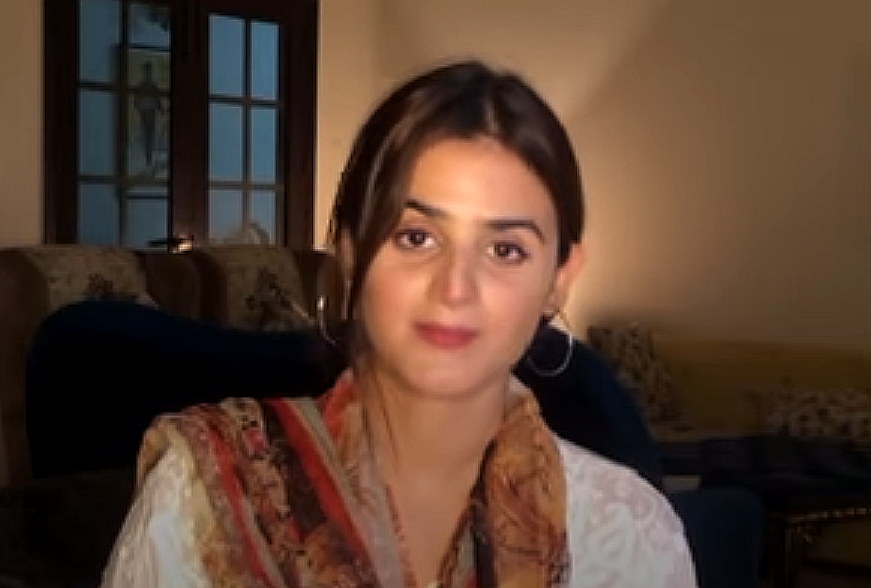
- Born: Hira Jamal; Karachi, Sindh, Pakistan
- Other name: Hira Salman
- Occupations: Actress, model, singer, VJ, host
- Years active: 2010 –present
- Spouse: Salman Saqib Sheikh (m. 2008)
- Children: 2

Hira Salman (née Jamal), known as Hira Mani (Urdu: حرا مانی), is a Pakistani television actress, singer, presenter, and former video jockey. She starred as the lead in several hit series, including Jab We Wed (2014), Preet Na Kariyo Koi (2015), Sun Yaara (2016) Yaqeen Ka Safar (2017), Thays (2018), Do Bol (2019), Ghalati (2020), Meray Paas Tum Ho (2019), Kashf (2020), Yun Tu Hai Pyar Bohut (2021) and Mein Hari Piya (2021).

== Career ==
Mani started her career as a video jockey before moving on to hosting. She co-hosted the Hum 2 Hamara Show on Hum TV with Mani, which earned her critical recognition, and they both followed it with the Hira Mani Show (2010). Hira made her acting debut along with her husband Mani in ARY Digital's Meri Teri Kahani (2012). The show was inspired by the American series Curb Your Enthusiasm. Both (Mani and Hira) appeared as fictionalized versions of themselves. She then appeared as Heer in Jab We Wed (2013) and as Hareem in Firaaq (2013). In 2015, she portrayed the role of Shagufta in Hum TV's Preet Na Kariyo Koi opposite Ahsan Khan. She received critical praise for portraying an emotionally intense character in the serial. She later appeared as a guest in Mr. Shamim (2016) and Kitni Girhain Baaki Hain 2 (2016). Her stint in hit TV series, Mere Paas Tum Ho was critically acclaimed. The TV series also featured Humayun Saeed, Adnan Siddiqui, and Ayeza Khan in lead roles.

In 2020, Mani portrayed the title role in Kashf as a woman engaged in nightmares that eventually come true. While praising her performance, Buraq Shabbir of The News International opined that the series "allows her to showcase her acting prowess like never before." In addition, she received the nominations of Best TV Actress - Critics' choice and Best Television Actress - Jury, respectively, at the 20th Lux Style Awards and the 2nd Pakistan International Screen Awards.

== Personal life ==
Hira married fellow actor Salman Saqib Sheikh (Mani) at the age of 19. Their marriage ceremony took place on 18 April 2008. They frequently work together in most of their projects. The couple has two sons, Muzammil (born in 2009) and Ibrahim (born in 2014). In May 2021, Hira was mugged outside her home in Karachi, the video of which went viral.

== Filmography ==
=== Films ===
Year	Title	Role	Notes	Ref(s)
2023	Teri Meri Kahaniyaan	Mumtaz	Debut; Anthology film	

=== Television ===
Year	Title	Role	Network	Notes	Ref(s)
2013	Meri Teri Kahani	Hira		Inspired by Curb Your Enthusiasm	
2014	Jab We Wed	Heer			
2014	Firaaq	Hareem			
2015	Preet Na Kariyo Koi	Shagufta Shehzadi			
2017	Sun Yaara	Roshanay (Roshni)			
2017	Bilqees Urf Bitto	Bilqees (Bitto)			
2017	Yaqeen Ka Safar	Gaiti Haroon			
2017	Pagli	Gul Rukh			
2018	Mera Khuda Jane	Roohi			
2018	Thays	Rubab		Also playback singer for title song	
2018	Dil Mom Ka Diya	Tamkinat			
2018	Aangan	Tehmina		Episode 1–10	
2019	Bandish	Sania Junaid			
2019	Do Bol	Gaiti Ara			
2019	Mohabbat Na Kariyo	Zara			
2019	Mere Paas Tum Ho	Hania			
2019	Ghalati	Zaira			
2020	Kashf	Kashf Bint-e-Imtiaz			
2020	Mohabbatein Chahatein	Sneha			
2021	Yun Tu Hai Pyar Bohut	Aima			
2021	Mein Hari Piya	Sara			
2022	Ibn-e-Hawa	Mahjabeen			
2022	Yeh Na Thi Hamari Qismat	Muntaha			
2023	Hum Dono		Hum TV	Mini Series	
2023	Meher Mah		Green Entertainment		
2023	Kalank	Sara			
2024	Jaan Se Pyara Juni	Husan Ara	Hum TV		
2024	Sunn Mere Dil	Hamsha	Geo Entertainment		
2025	Dayan	Shabab	Geo Entertainment	Along with Mehwish Hayat	
2025	SharPasand	Shazmeen	ARY Digital		
2026	Rahguzar		Green Entertainment		
TBA	Khafa †	TBA	Geo Entertainment		

=== Special appearance ===
Year	Title	Role	Notes	Refs
2010–2011	Hum 2 Humara Show	Host		
2011	Hira Mani Show	Host		
2012	Hum Sab Umeed Se Hain	Host		
2015	Chaman Ara	Chaman Ara's daughter-in-law	Television film	
2016	Shilae Maseen	Shilae	Television film	
2016	Mr Shamim	Herself	Eid special	
2016	Kitni Girhain Baaki Hain (season 2)	Saba Kamran	Episode 1; Jhoota Bartan	
2016	Kitni Girhain Baaki Hain (season 2)	Sana	Episode 26; Adhi Ghar Wali	
2019	Dil Toh Bacha Hai	Zulekha (Aini)	Television film	
2023	Siyaah	Uzma	Episode: "Haail"	

=== Music video ===
Year	Title	Singer	Notes
2020	"Ye Watan Tumhara Hai"	Various	

== Discography ==
Year	Title	Singer(s)	Label	Ref(s)
2021	"Sawaari"	Herself	Kashmir Beats	
2022	"Tamanna"	Herself	Kashmir Beats	

== Awards and nominations ==
Year	Award	Category	Result	Ref(s)
2018	Hum Awards	Best Supporting Actress for Yaqeen Ka Safar	Nominated	
2019	ARY Digital- Social Media Drama Awards 2018	Best Supporting Actor (Female) for Dil Mom Ka Diya	Nominated	
2019	ARY Digital- Social Media Drama Awards 2018	Best Couple for Dil Mom Ka Diya	Nominated	
2020	Pakistan International Screen Awards	Best Television Actress-Critic for Do Bol	Nominated	
2021	ARY People's Choice Awards	Favorite Actress for Ghalati	Nominated	
2021	ARY People's Choice Awards	Favorite Actress in a role of Bahu for Ghalati	Won	
2021	ARY People's Choice Awards	Favorite Actress in a role of Bhabhi for Ghalati	Nominated	
2021	Lux Style Awards	Best Female Actor-Critics for Kashf	Nominated	
2021	Pakistan International Screen Awards	Best Television Actress (Jury) for Kashf	Nominated	
