= Bikhra Mera Naseeb =

- Promotional poster
- Genre: Romance; Hatred
- Written by: Saima Younus
- Directed by: Furqan Khan
- Starring: Ayeza Khan; Sami Khan; Feroze Khan; Aleezay Rasul
- Country of origin: Pakistan
- Original language: Urdu
- No. of episodes: 20

Production
- Production company: A&B Entertainment

Original release
- Network: Geo TV
- Release: 2 May 2014 – 2 January 2015

Bikhra Mera Naseeb (Urdu: بکھرا میرا نصیب, lit. 'My Scattered Destiny') is a 2014 Pakistani drama serial directed by Furqan Khan, produced by A&B Entertainment and written by Saima Younus. The drama stars Ayeza Khan, Sami Khan, Aleezay Rasul and Feroze Khan in lead roles. The drama was first aired 2 May 2014 on Geo Entertainment.

== Synopsis ==
The story revolves around Hina (Ayeza Khan) whose life is full of fun and parties. She is the daughter of Basit Alvi, who tries to protect her from the wrong people. Still, she falls prey to wrong company, which leads her to the wrong path. The person spoiling Hina is Sania Begum. The other protagonist in the story is Ujala (Aleezay Rasul), who struggles to survive daily. Her father is very ill and the financial condition is bad due to which, she has to go and live with her relatives. Basit Alvi then comes into Ujala's life and takes care of her education and her father's treatment. However, Hina feels neglected and is jealous of Ujala and her family. The feeling is mutual as Hina always humiliates Ujala.

== Cast ==
- Ayeza Khan as Hina Alvi
- Sami Khan as Haris
- Aleezay Rasul as Ujala
- Feroze Khan
- Shehryar Zaidi
- Saba Hameed
- Ismat Zaidi
- Mehmood Akhtar
- Seemi Pasha
- Fozia Mushtaq
