= Alif =

Alif may refer to:

== Languages ==
- Alif (ا) in the Arabic alphabet, equivalent to aleph, the first letter of many Semitic alphabets
  - Dagger alif, superscript alif in Arabic alphabet
- Alif, the first letter of the Urdu alphabet
- Alif, the eighth consonant of the Thaana abugida used in Dhivehi

== Films and TV ==
- Alif (2015 film), an Indian Malayalam film
- Alif (2016 film), an Indian Hindi film produced by Pawan Tiwari and Zaigham Imam
- Alif (TV series), a Pakistani drama produced by Samina Humayun Saeed

== Places ==
- Ari Atoll or Alif, a historic administrative division of the Maldives
- Alif, Iran, a village in Fars Province, Iran

== Other uses ==
- Alif (rapper) (born 1989), singer, lyricist, composer and recording publisher
- Anterior Lumbar Interbody Fusion, a type of spinal fusion
- ALIF (Liberate Attack of the Feminist Infantry), female hip hop group from Senegal
