= Preet Na Kariyo Koi =

2015 Pakistani television series

- Genre: Drama; Romantic comedy Political
- Written by: Amna Mufti
- Directed by: Ehteshamuddin
- Starring: Ahsan Khan; Hira Mani; Mira Sethi
- Country of origin: Pakistan
- Original language: Urdu
- No. of episodes: 19

Production
- Producer: Momina Duraid
- Camera setup: multi-camera setup
- Production company: MD Productions

Original release
- Network: Hum TV
- Release: 3 November 2015 – 8 March 2016

Preet Na Kariyo Koi (Urdu: پریت نہ کریو کوئی, lit. 'Don't no one fall in love!') is a Pakistani romantic comedy drama serial first aired from 3 November 2015 to 8 March 2016 on Hum TV. It is written by Amna Mufti, directed by Mohammed Ehteshamuddin and produced by Momina Duraid under her production company. It stars Ahsan Khan and Hira Mani in lead roles. The series received acclaim due to script, direction and Mani's performance.

== Plot ==
Preet Na Kariyo Koi is a story of Shagufta, Ilyas and Shams. Shagufta is a simple small town girl who is engaged to her cousin Ilyas. Ilyas runs a dress shop and avoids street fights and corporate politics, however Shagufta views him as weak and dreams of marrying a striking and courageous man who can stand up for himself and his family. Shagufta starts to admire her college mate Shams and the admiration transforms into a relationship that leads her to take life changing decision. In what capacity will Shagufta live with the improvements that occur in her life once Shams enters it?

== Cast ==
- Ahsan Khan as Shams
- Hira Mani as Shagufta Shehzadi a.k.a. Goshi
- Noor Zafar Khan as Noor-ul-Ain a.k.a. Noori
- Saman Ansari as Zarina
- Mira Sethi as Mariam
- Adnan Shah Tipu as Mushtaq
- Irfan Khoosat as Fayyaz
- Rehan Sheikh as Sulehri Sahab
- Fariya Hassan as Saima
- Hassan Noman as Ilyas
- Naghma as Ilyas's mother
- Zain Mumtaz Raja as Bhola

== Soundtrack ==
Preet Na Kariyo Koi – OST

Soundtrack album by Rahat Fateh Ali Khan
- Released: 31 October 2015
- Recorded: 2015
- Genre: Television soundtrack
- Length: (3:05)
- Language: Urdu
- Label: Hum TV

Music video
- "Preet Na Kariyo Koi" OST on Dailymotion

The title song was sung by Rahat Fateh Ali Khan. The music was composed by Sahir Ali Bagga and the lyrics were written by Imran Raza. Preet Na Kariyo Koi on SoundCloud

== Production ==
After rejecting from various television networks, the script then came across director Mohammed Ehteshamuddin who decided to work on it with producer Momina Duraid. Mani was cast to portray the leading role of Shagufta Shehzadi by Duraid after judging her performance in Duraid's Firaaq (2014). The series thus marked her first appearance in a leading role and her first appearance with Khan, the second being Aangan (2018) which was also directed by Ehteshamuddin.

The series has been shoot in Karachi, Lahore and Hyderabad.

== Reception ==
=== Critical reception ===
Preet Na Kariyo Koi received positive reviews with praise towards the Ehteshamuddin's direction, cinematography, Mufti's script and performances of the actors, especially of Hira Mani's performance who received critical praise for portraying an emotionally intense and strong-headed woman. In an article, Express Tribune praised the women portrayal in the series stating, "With dramas like Udaari and Preet Na Kariyo Koi promising the return of challenging and unique female roles,..." The Friday Times also praised the strong and nuanced depiction of the female protagonist.
