= Ibn-e-Hawwa =

2022 Pakistani drama by Syed Ahmad Kamran

- Genre: Patriarchy; Feminism; Romance
- Written by: Saji Gul
- Directed by: Syed Ahmed Kamran
- Starring: Hira Mani; Shehzad Sheikh; Aymen Saleem
- Theme music composer: Naveed Nashad
- Opening theme: "Ibn e Hawwa" by Rahat Fateh Ali Khan
- Country of origin: Pakistan
- Original language: Urdu
- No. of episodes: 28

Production
- Executive producer: Momina Duraid
- Producer: Momina Duraid
- Running time: 33–37 minutes
- Production company: MD Productions

Original release
- Network: Hum TV
- Release: 8 February – 20 August 2022

Ibn-e-Hawwa (Urdu: ابنِ حوّا, lit. 'Son of Eve') is a Pakistani television drama series produced by Momina Duraid under banner MD Productions, written by Saji Gul and directed by Syed Ahmed Kamran. It stars Hira Mani, Shahzad Sheikh and Aymen Saleem. It aired weekly on Hum TV from 8 February to 20 August 2022.

Ibn-e-Hawwa is a portrayal of how men are taught to hate women. Further, the writer states that being called 'Ibn-e-Adam', men are made to associate themselves with a male figure. Hawa's name often gets overshadowed.

== Plot ==
Ibn-e-Hawwa revolves around a typical Pakistani mohalla (neighbourhood) where misogyny is deeply rooted. The story starts with Mahjabeen, a young pious widow who makes all the arrangements for the marriage of her deceased husband's relatives. She does all the arrangements with the help of Shabratan, an older cunning lady of the mohalla who lives with her joyful and free-spirited daughter, Aliya. Aliya falls for Zahid, a cruel and cold-hearted man, tailor by profession and who doesn’t know how to respect women as his mother has left him with his sister and father. His father has always told him that his mother betrayed him, so he becomes afraid of women and labels them as unfaithful in his mind. After his father's death, Naseem (his mother) returns in his life as she wants to meet her children.

Mahjabeen who doest not know much about Zahid then does contract marriage with him. Naseem at first hates her and says she married him because she’s a woman of bad character but then apologizes for judging her too quickly.

== Cast ==
- Shahzad Sheikh as Zahid, a cold blooded man who has no respect for women
- Hira Mani as Mahjabeen, a young pious widow who wants to marry to perform hajj
- Aymen Saleem as Aliya, a free spirited lively girl who loves Zahid
- Nadia Afgan as Shabratan, Aliya's manipulating and opportunistic mother and Mahjabeen's friend
- Noman Habib as Ahsan aka ‘Guddu’, Mahjabeen's nephew
- Hina Shahid/ Hareem Sohail as Naila, Zahid's sister who becomes victim of his cruel behaviour
- Agha Talal as Shakoor, worker in Zahid's shop who loves Naila
- Tahira Imam as Zahid's aunt
- Zain Afzal as Waqar "Vicky"
- Inaya Khan as Sajida, Aliya's friend
- Malik Raza as Raza, Zahid and Naila's father
- Sabahat Adil Khan as Naseem, Zahid & Naila's mother
- Asad Mumtaz Malik as Sethi, Mahjabeen's Husband

== Production ==
The project was first announced by Saleem through his Instagram account.

The series is written by Saji Gul who previously write for O Rangreza and directed by Syed Ahmed Kamran who previously directed crime thriller Phaans.

In conversation with Dawn Images, Gul said that the drama's theme tackles the issue of misogyny. "It will be about how the mind of a man is moulded within a patriarchal system, how he is taught that a woman is inherently evil, how the man starts seeing all relationships in a negative light and as a burden, how he sees a woman as a deceiver," he said.

Speaking about the series' title he said, "Normally the terms Ibn-e-Adam (son of Adam) or Bint e Hawwa (daughter of Eve) are used. However, [we tend to forget] the son of Adam is also the son of Eve, he doesn't just descend from Adam alone."

The initial teasers were released on 21 January 2022.

== Soundtrack ==
"Kese Samjhaun Tujhe"

Song by Rahat Fateh Ali Khan
- Released: 12 February 2022
- Length: 4:10
- Label: Hum
- Composer: Naveed Nashad
- Lyricist: Qamar Nashad
- Producer: Momina Duraid

Music video
- Video on YouTube

== Reception ==
While reviewing initial episodes, a reviewer from The News International praised the storyline of the series and lauded the Saleem's performance as Aaliya and called it, "a breath of fresh air".

The serial started with a TRP of 7.8.
