= Ghalati =

Pakistani television series

- غلطی
- Genre: Drama; Romance
- Written by: Asma Sayani
- Directed by: Saba Hameed
- Starring: Hira Mani; Affan Waheed
- Theme music composer: Naveed Naushad
- Opening theme: "Ghalti Meri" by Nabeel Shaukat Ali
- Country of origin: Pakistan
- Original language: Urdu
- No. of seasons: 1
- No. of episodes: 25

Production
- Executive producer: Nadeem Baig
- Producers: Humayun Saeed; Shehzad Naseeb
- Running time: 39 Minutes
- Production company: Six Sigma Plus

Original release
- Network: ARY Digital
- Release: 19 December 2019 – 4 June 2020

Ghalati (Urdu: غلطی, lit. 'Mistake') is a 2019 Pakistani romantic drama television series that premiered on ARY Digital on 19 December 2019. It is directed by Saba Hameed and written by Asma Sayani. Produced by Humayun Saeed under Six Sigma Plus, it stars Hira Mani and Affan Waheed.

== Plot ==
The show revolves around the life of Zaira and Saad, a married couple whose married life deteriorates quickly due to Saad's anger and constant threats of divorcing her which ends up happening knowingly yet unknowingly by Saad. Zaitoon (Saad's mother) always takes it upon herself to start problems between Saad and Zaira because she feels that Zaira is dangerous as she is an educated and strong headed girl.

== Cast ==
- Hira Mani as Zaira
- Affan Waheed as Saad
- Anoushay Abbasi as Maira
- Faris Shafi as Sohail
- Mehar Bano as Shanzay
- Sana Askari as Aliyah
- Saba Hameed as Zaitoon; Saad's mother
- Fareeda Shabbir as Samina; Zaitoon's sister
- Saba Faisal as Nafeesa; Zaira's mother
- Shehryar Zaidi as Shabbir; Zaira's father
- Natalia Awais as Guriya; Saad's cousin
- Faheem Abbas as Asad; Aliyah's husband
- Shazia Qaiser as Asad's mother
- Usama Khan as Fahad
- Sabiha Hashmi as Fahad's mother

== Soundtrack ==
Ghalati

Soundtrack album by Nabeel Shaukat Ali
- Released: 19 December 2019
- Recorded: 2019
- Genre: Television soundtrack
- Length: 3:22
- Language: Urdu
- Label: ARY Digital

Music video
- "OST: Ghalati" on YouTube

The original soundtrack is sung by Nabeel Shaukat Ali and composed by Naveed Nashad on lyrics of Imran Raza. Reviewer from The News International wrote, "With Naveed Nashad's gripping OST and Imran Raza's lyrics, one can get a song that can be listened to whenever mood is down".

== Awards and nominations ==
Date of ceremony	Award	Category	Recipient(s) and nominee(s)	Result	References
March 2021	ARY People's Choice Awards	Favorite OST	Ghalati	Nominated	
March 2021	ARY People's Choice Awards	Favorite Actor	Affan Waheed	Nominated	
March 2021	ARY People's Choice Awards	Favorite Actor in a role of Bhai	Affan Waheed	Won	
March 2021	ARY People's Choice Awards	Favorite Actress	Hira Mani	Nominated	
March 2021	ARY People's Choice Awards	Favorite Actress in a role of Bahu	Hira Mani	Won	
March 2021	ARY People's Choice Awards	Favorite Actress in a role of Bhabhi	Hira Mani	Nominated	
March 2021	ARY People's Choice Awards	Favorite Actress in a role of Nand	Sana Askari	Nominated	
March 2021	ARY People's Choice Awards	Favorite Actress in a role of Maa	Saba Hameed	Nominated	
5 November 2021	2nd Pakistan International Screen Awards	Best Television Actor (Popular)	Affan Waheed	Nominated	
