= Merub Ali =

Pakistani actress and model (born 1996

- Born: 22 January 2002 (age 24); Karachi, Sindh, Pakistan
- Occupations: Actress, Influencer
- Years active: 2018–present
- Known for: Paristan, Wabaal

Merub Ali is a Pakistani television actress and influencer. She made her acting debut in the 2022 series Sinf-e-Aahan. Besides acting, she is known for her outspoken and inclusive nature.

== Early life and career ==
Merub was raised in Saudi Arabia and moved to Pakistan in 2015. She is the youngest sister of two brothers. She started her career as an Instagram influencer and rose to fame with a 2021 project Sinf-e-Aahan and Ramadan's particular play Paristan. She got her first lead role in 2022 with Hum TV's Wabaal opposite Sarah Khan and Talha Chahour. Merub's recent appearance is Zhallay in Faraar, concluded in April 2025.

== Filmography ==
=== Television ===
Year	Title	Role	Network	Notes
2021	Sinf-e-Aahan	Gul Khanzada	ARY Digital	
2022	Paristan	Ujala	Hum TV	
2022	Wabaal	Maham	Hum TV	Lead role
2025	Faraar	Zhallay	Green Entertainment	Lead role

=== Music videos ===
Year	Song	Artist	Notes
2018	Lagaya Dil	Sajjad Ali	
2022	Chal Jaan De	Asim Azhar	
2022	Baarish	Sajjad Ali	
