= Thays =

Pakistani television drama

- Written by: Imran Nazeer
- Directed by: Kashif Saleem
- Starring: Junaid Khan; Hira Mani; Farah Shah
- Country of origin: Pakistan
- Original language: Urdu

Production
- Producer: Kashif Saleem

Original release
- Network: A-Plus Entertainment
- Release: 18 April – 6 October 2018

Thays (Urdu: ٹھیس, lit. 'Wound') is a Pakistani television drama that first aired on 18 April 2018 on A-Plus TV. It stars Junaid Khan and Hira Mani in lead roles.

== Plot ==
Rubab is in love with Asher, but he is not interested in her. Rubab's mother, Zehra, is very possessive of her daughter. She does not want Rubab and Asher to be together and conspires to keep them apart. She forges letters from Asher to Rubab. The letter states that Asher is in love with his colleague and has married her.

Unable to bear the pain, Rubab tries to commit suicide. Asher gets concerned for Rubab. Zehra then hires a girl who blames Asher for sexual harassment. Zehra gets Rubab married to a man of her choice, unaware that he's a con man. Rubab's husband exploits her for money and abandons her while she is pregnant. Zehra tries to manipulate the situation again but fails as Rubab discovers the truth.

Rubab also finds out that Zehra had falsely accused Asher previously. Rubab eventually reunites with Asher.

== Cast ==
- Junaid Khan as Asher
- Hira Mani as Rubab
- Farah Shah as Zehra
- Nadia Hussain as Shahishta
- Sabiha Hashmi as Raesa
- Nazish Jahangir as Zoya
- Tabbasum Arif as Zoya's mother
- Birjees Farooqui as Shayan's mother
- Waqas Majeed as Ashwaq

== Soundtrack ==
Thays - OST

Soundtrack album by Junaid Khan and Hira Mani
- Released: 26 March 2018
- Recorded: 2018
- Genre: Television soundtrack
- Length: (4:50)
- Language: Urdu
- Label: A-Plus TV

Music video
- "Thays" OST on YouTube

The title song was performed by Junaid Khan and Hira Mani. The music was composed by Naveed Nashad and the lyrics were written by Ghazala Naqvi. It has more than 1.4 million views on YouTube.
