= Arslan Naseer =

Pakistani actor and content creator

Arslan Naseer (CBA)
- ارسلان نصیر
- Born: Arslan Naseer; Lahore, Punjab, Pakistan
- Occupation: Film creator
- Years active: 2011–present

Arslan Naseer

YouTube information
- Channel: Arsalan Naseer
- Years active: 2011–present
- Genres: Sports; Entertainment
- Subscribers: 1.63 million ▲
- Views: 351 million ▲
- Last updated: 29 June 2026

Arslan Naseer is a Pakistani actor, writer, and content creator. He is known for his scriptwriting contributions to the animated series Burka Avenger and for his acting roles in Pakistani television.

Naseer made his acting debut on Hum TV's Ramadan romantic comedy Chupke Chupke in 2021.

== Career ==
In 2014, Arslan Naseer became a scriptwriter for Burka Avenger, a Pakistani animated series created by musician Haroon. In 2021, he made his acting debut on Hum TV's Ramadan drama Chupke Chupke, where he portrayed the character "Hadi," an unemployed bachelor.

Naseer appeared in the telefilm Hona Tha Pyar alongside Sanam Jung and took on another role in Paristan, a Ramadan series on Hum TV, again co-starring with Aymen Saleem.

Naseer has also completed work on Siyaah, produced by IRK Films and aired on Green Entertainment.

== Filmography ==
=== Film ===
Year	Title	Role	Notes
2022	Dum Mastam	CBA	Cameo appearance

=== Television ===
Year	Title	Role	Network	Notes
2013–16	Burka Avenger	—		Writer
2021	Chupke Chupke	Muhammad Hadi Kamil	Hum TV	Television debut
2021	Hona Tha Pyar			Telefilm
2022	Paristan	Arsam	Hum TV	
2023	Neem	Shazil	Hum TV	
2023	Siyaah	Sherry		Episode "Do Anjaane"
2024	Radd	Zain	ARY Digital	
2024	Pas e Deewar	Iftikhar	Green Entertainment	
2024	Tere Naam Ka Tattoo			Telefilm
2025	Jinn Ki Shadi Unki Shadi	Asad	Hum TV	

== Awards and recognition ==
Year	Award	Category	Work	Result	Ref
2021	PISA	Best Use of Humour on Social Media	—N/a	Won	
2022	Hum Award	Best New Sensation Male	—N/a	Won	
2023	Lux Style Award	Best TV Actor Viewers' Choice	Paristan	Won	
