= Chupke Chupke (TV series) =

2021 Pakistani rom-com television series

- Genre: Romantic comedy Family drama
- Written by: Saima Akram Chaudhry
- Directed by: Danish Nawaz
- Starring: Ayeza Khan; Osman Khalid Butt; Arslan Naseer; Aymen Saleem; (For entire cast see below)
- Theme music composer: Naveed Nashad
- Opening theme: "Pareshan Kyun Lage Tu" by Ali Zafar and Nirmal Roy
- Country of origin: Pakistan
- Original language: Urdu
- No. of episodes: 30

Production
- Producer: Momina Duraid
- Production locations: Karachi, Sindh
- Cinematography: Tameen Nizami
- Editors: Muhammad Adeel Khalid; Faizan Ghauri
- Running time: 32 - 40 minutes
- Production company: MD Productions

Original release
- Network: Hum TV
- Release: 14 April – 13 May 2021

Chupke Chupke (Urdu: چُپکے چُپکے, transl. Secretly) is a 2021 Pakistani romantic comedy television series directed by Danish Nawaz, written by Saima Akram Chaudhry and produced by Momina Duraid under their production banner MD Productions. The series aired during Ramadan, in April and May 2021 and was broadcast on Hum TV. It revolves around the Nawab family, who, after the death of the Nawab, are plagued by a bitter rivalry between his two wives, Naik Bakht and Naik Parwar, who clash on every possible occasion.

The series stars Ayeza Khan and Osman Khalid Butt as the leading couple, Meenu and Faazi, alongside Arslan Naseer and Aymen Saleem as Hadi and Mishi.

The series received acclaim due its comic story line, on-screen chemistry of the lead couples and the performances, especially of Butt, Khan, Abbas and Beg. It was the 3rd most searched item on Google in Pakistan for 2021.

== Plot ==
The Nawab family is divided by a long-running rivalry between the two wives of the late Nawab Sahab: Naik Parwar, who lives at Nawab Villa, and Naik Bakht, who lives at Nawab House. The two grandsons of Naik Parwar, Hadi and Faazi, and the granddaughters of Naik Bakht, including Mishi, are caught up in the matriarchs' constant clashes.

Hadi is unemployed, and his mother and grandmother search for a suitable match for him. Meanwhile, Meenu, a carefree and clumsy girl, is constantly at odds with her tutor Faazi, who has been asked to teach her by her father.

Kishwar arranges a match in Canada for Hadi, but the engagement collapses two days before the wedding when the bride reveals she has already secretly married someone else, much to Mishi's relief. Mishi begins to develop feelings for Hadi, who is hesitant to act on his own feelings for her because of his friendship with Faazi and the ongoing feud between the households.

A family comes to consider Faazi as a match for their daughter Hania, who also has a brother, Asher, in need of a match. Amid the confusion of arranging matches between the two families, Hania's parents instead select Meenu for their son, and a double wedding is arranged for Meenu and Faazi on the same day, while Mishi is engaged to Hania's cousin.

On the wedding day, it emerges that Asher is already married with children and was only seeking a second wife, leading Meenu's family to call off her wedding. It then comes out that Hania's prior engagements had also fallen through, and Faazi's wedding to her, along with Mishi's engagement, are called off as well. To preserve the family's reputation, both households agree instead to marry Faazi and Meenu. The couple slowly grow closer despite opposition from the family, until Bade Abba, the respected elder of the family, intervenes and sends Meenu to live at Nawab House.

As Hadi and Mishi's relationship develops, Bade Abba presses Hadi to marry his granddaughter instead, an arrangement the rest of the family supports. When Faazi learns that Meenu knew of Hadi and Mishi's relationship and kept it from him, he orders her to leave the house; she returns to Nawab Villa. A misunderstanding leads the family to believe Faazi struck Meenu, prompting Hadi to confront him and publicly declare his love for Mishi, before Mishi disappears. Bade Abba gives Hadi two days to find her or be married to his granddaughter instead; when the search fails, preparations begin for that wedding.

Faazi, wanting to save his marriage, persuades Gul to apologise to Meenu, while Hadi and Mishi speak by phone the night before his wedding, though she declines to return. At the ceremony, it is revealed that Hadi has secretly married Mishi all along, with the family having staged the entire event; Hadi also reveals that the divorce notice Meenu believed she had sent him was a fake, devised to test Faazi's loyalty. Faazi apologises to Meenu, and the two reconcile.

The story closes with all four couples Faazi and Meenu, Hadi and Mishi, Miskeen and Gul, and Mani and Roomi settled into married life.

== Cast ==
- Osman Khalid Butt as Faaz "Faazi" Ibrahim : Gul's 1 minute younger twin brother; Roomi & Mishi's older brother; Meenu's husband.
- Ayeza Khan as Maneeha "Meenu" Kifayat Ali/Maneeha Faaz : Kifayat and Kaneez's daughter; Faaz's wife; Mirchi's older sister.
- Arslan Naseer as Muhammad Hadi Kamil : Kamil & Kishwar's son; Mishi's husband; Waleed's older brother.
- Aymen Saleem as Ramisha "Mishi" Ibrahim/Ramisha Hadi : Gul, Faaz & Roomi's youngest sister; Hadi's Wife.
- Asma Abbas as Naik Parwar : Nawab Sahab's first wife; matriarch of Nawab Villa; Kifayat & Kamil's mother; Hadi, Meenu, Waleed & Mirchi's grandmother.
- Uzma Beg as Naik "Bakhto" Bakht : Nawab Sahab's second wife; matriarch of the Nawab House; Ibrahim's mother; Gul, Faazi, Roomi & Mishi's grandmother.
- Aadi Khan as Waleed "Kaddu" Kamil : Kamil & Kishwar's son; Hadi's younger brother; Jannat's love interest.
- Farhan Ally Agha as Kifayat Ali : Nawab & Naik Parwar's younger son; Kaneez's husband; Meenu & Mirchi's father.
- Tara Mahmood as Kaneez Kifayat Ali : Kifayat's wife; Meenu & Mirchi's mother.
- Ayesha Mirza as Kishwar Kamil : Kamil's widow; Hadi & Waleed's mother.
- Mira Sethi as Gul-e-Rana aka Gul/Minto: Faaz's 1 minute older twin sister; Roomi & Mishi's older sister; Miskeen's wife.
- Ali Safina as Miskeen Ali : Gul's husband.
- Hira Soomro as Rameen "Roomi" Armaan : Faaz & Gul's younger sister; Mishi's older sister; Armaan's wife.
- Areesha Sultan as Muneeba "Mirchi" Kifayat Ali : Kifayat and Kaneez's daughter; Meenu's younger sister.
- Salman Saqib as Armaan aka Mani : Roomi's husband.
- Qavi Khan as Bade Abba : Nawab Sahab's elder brother.
- Arisha Razi as Jannat : Waleed's coach's daughter & love interest.
- Sidra Niazi as Hania Amjad : Faaz' ex fiancée; Ashar's sister.
- Arslan Asad Butt as Ashar Amjad : Meenu's ex fiancé; Hania's brother.
- Shehryar Zaidi as Mr. Amjad : Hania & Ashar's father.
- Salma Asim as Mrs. Amjad : Hania & Ashar's mother.
- Nadia Hussain as Mai Choo Mantar.
- Sumbul Shahid as Khala

== Production ==
Writer Saima Akram Chaudhry revealed in an interview that Meenu's character is inspired from the personality of Pakistani drama writer Misbah Nousheen. The principal photography was halted in 2020 due to the ongoing COVID-19 pandemic, and resumed in October. Because of this, some character's were recast, included Ayeza Khan replacing Sohai Ali Abro as Meenu and Asma Abbas replacing Beo Raana Zafar as Naik Parwar, which was also offered to Nadia Afgan. The first episode of the series was aired on 14 April 2021.

== Reception ==
=== Critical reception ===
The first episode of the series received mixed reviews due to complex dynamics of the characters and their relations with each other. DAWN Images praised the performances of Asma Abbas, Uzma Beg and their characters' dynamics. Osman Khalid Butt and Ayeza Khan's performance was also praised with Khan's performance was called as "surprise" as she usually plays damsel in distress. The on-screen chemistry of the lead couples were also lauded, especially of Arslan Naseer and Aymen Saleem which earned social media acclaim prominence to the couple. While writing for Dawn, Maliha Rehman criticised the portrayal of talaq in the series as a stigma for women. It was also criticized for the depiction of cousin marriage.

It became third most searched item on google among 'Movie & TV' in Pakistan in the year it was broadcast, as reported by the Google Trends at the end of the year.

== Awards and nominations ==
Date of ceremony	Awards	Category	Recipient	Result	Ref.
24 September 2022	Hum Awards	Best Drama Serial - Popular	Momina Duraid	Nominated	
24 September 2022	Hum Awards	Best Drama Serial - Jury	Momina Duraid	Nominated	
24 September 2022	Hum Awards	Best Actress - Popular	Ayeza Khan	Won	
24 September 2022	Hum Awards	Best Actress - Jury	Ayeza Khan	Nominated	
24 September 2022	Hum Awards	Best Actor - Popular	Osman Khalid Butt	Nominated	
24 September 2022	Hum Awards	Best Actor - Jury	Osman Khalid Butt	Nominated	
24 September 2022	Hum Awards	Best Onscreen Couple Popular	Ayeza Khan and Osman Khalid Butt	Won	
24 September 2022	Hum Awards	Best Onscreen Couple Popular	Aymen Saleem and Arslan Naseer	Nominated	
24 September 2022	Hum Awards	Best Onscreen Couple - Jury	Ayeza Khan and Osman Khalid Butt	Won	
24 September 2022	Hum Awards	Best Onscreen Couple - Jury	Aymen Saleem and Arslan Naseer	Nominated	
24 September 2022	Hum Awards	Best Television Sensation Female	Aymen Saleem	Won	
24 September 2022	Hum Awards	Best Television Sensation Male	Arslan Naseer	Won	
24 September 2022	Hum Awards	Best Original Soundtrack	Momina Duraid and Naveed Nashad	Nominated	
24 November 2022	Lux Style Awards	Best TV Play	Chupke Chupke	Nominated	
24 November 2022	Lux Style Awards	Best TV Actress - Viewers' Choice	Ayeza Khan	Won	
24 November 2022	Lux Style Awards	Best Emerging Talent in TV	Aymen Saleem	Nominated	
24 November 2022	Lux Style Awards	Best Ensemble TV Play	Chupke Chupke	Nominated	
24 November 2022	Lux Style Awards	Best TV Track	Ali Zafar, Nirmal Roy & Naveed Nashad	Nominated	
