= Do Bol =

Pakistani television series

- Genre: Drama; Romance
- Written by: Sarwat Nazir
- Directed by: Syed Wajahat Hussain
- Starring: Hira Mani; Affan Waheed (Full cast)
- Theme music composer: Naveed Naushad
- Opening theme: Ja Tujhey Mauf Kiya by Nabeel Shaukat Ali; Aima Baig
- Country of origin: Pakistan
- Original language: Urdu
- No. of seasons: 1
- No. of episodes: 30

Production
- Executive producer: Nadeem Baig
- Producers: Humayun Saeed; Shahzad Nasib; Samina Humayun Saeed; Sana Shahnawaz
- Camera setup: Multi-camera setup
- Running time: 32–48 minutes
- Production companies: Six Sigma Plus; Next Level Entertainment

Original release
- Network: ARY Digital
- Release: 5 March – 5 May 2019

Do Bol (Urdu: دو بول, lit. 'Two Words') previously titled Aseer e Mohabbat is a 2019 Pakistani romantic drama television series that originally aired on ARY Digital from 5 March 2019 to 5 May 2019. It is directed by Syed Wajahat Hussain and written by Sarwat Nazir. Produced by Humayun Saeed and Shahzad Nasib under Six Sigma Plus in collaboration with Next Level Entertainment, it stars Hira Mani and Affan Waheed.

== Plot ==
This serial depicts a complicated yet a very beautiful love story between two persons from entirely different family backgrounds. Gaiti (Hira Mani), a carefree and cheerful girl, belongs to a wealthy family while Badar (Affan Waheed), a mature guy, has a middle-class family background. He works as Gaiti's father's manager and often visits their home where he secretly falls in love with her. However, Gaiti is interested in her childhood friend Sameer (Haroon Shahid). Due to some unfavourable situations and misunderstandings by her step-mother and others, Gaiti is forced into marriage with Badar. Apparently, it is in favour of Badar but Gaiti is extremely unhappy with this marriage. Despite Gaiti's ignorance, Badar stands by her in all difficulties and keeps loving her more and more. But Gaiti finds it difficult to adjust in a family and home of lower financial status even as she tries her best. She moves to her real mother's place where she gets a lot of love but is thrown out when her mother dies. Badar goes and gets her back though she had deserted him. She moves back to her father's place and Sameer comes back when his misunderstandings are cleared. But Gaiti is now committed to Badar even though they have misunderstandings. The twists of circumstances eventually turn this forced marriage into a successful one and bring together the hearts of two.

== Cast ==
- Affan Waheed as Badar uz Zaman
- Hira Mani as Gaiti Ara
- Haroon Shahid as Sameer
- Laiba Khan as Rafia
- Mehmood Aslam as Iqbal Hussain; Gaiti's father
- Zainab Qayyum as Nafisa; Iqbal's 2nd wife, Gaiti's step-mother
- Samina Ahmed as Firdous; Iqbal's sister, Gaiti's aunt
- Seemi Pasha as Jahan Ara; Gaiti's mother
- Shehryar Zaidi as Nafees; Jahan Ara's husband, Gaiti's step father
- Anam Tanveer as Fareeha; Iqbal's younger sister, Gaiti's aunt, Hasaan's wife
- Rubina Ashraf as Qudsia; Badar's mother
- Shehzad Mukhtar as Badar's father
- Emmad Butt as Hasaan; Sameer's elder brother, Fareeha's husband
- Haris Waheed as Zafar; Firdous's son
- Akhtar Hasnain as Munawwar; Iqbal's younger brother, Gaiti's Uncle
- Salma Hassan as Nasreen; Munawwar's wife
- Mariam Mirza as Safeena; mother of Sameer and Hasaan
- Vasiya Fatima as Neelam, Gaiti's cousin, Munawwar and Nasreen's daughter
- Usman Mazhar as Lateef; Badar's childhood friend
- Salman Saeed as Jamshed; Badar's cousin
- Ifra Khalid as Rania; Badar's elder sister
- Laiba Khan as Rafia; Badar's younger sister
- Shaharyar Irfan as Khalid; Sameer's friend

== Release ==
The show originally started out airing on Tuesday nights where it aired 2 episodes in one week (as a double episode entertainment), then was extended to Wednesday nights where it aired 4 episodes in one week with two each day (as a double episode), and then finally aired on Monday, Tuesday, Wednesday and Sunday night in its last week with the last 8 episodes airing with two each day (as a double episode). The show was extended due to Ramadan being near and ARY Digital runs transmissions and game shows throughout the day, leaving space for barely any dramas in the week. The drama serial garnered immense popularity worldwide with being trending on YouTube in Pakistan and also other countries.

== Soundtrack ==
Do Bol - OST

Soundtrack album by Nabeel Shaukat Ali & Aima Baig
- Released: 25 February 2019
- Recorded: 2019
- Genre: Television soundtrack
- Length: (3:24)
- Language: Urdu
- Label: ARY Digital
External media
Audio
- "Do Bol" on SoundCloud
Video
- "Do Bol" OST on YouTube

The title song is Ja Tujhe Maaf Kiya by Nabeel Shaukat Ali and Aima Baig. The music was composed by Harris Shahryar and the lyrics were written by Naveed Naushad and Imran Raza. It has garnered more than 127 million views since uploaded in YouTube on 4 March 2019 as of 13 March 2024.

== Awards and nominations ==
Date of ceremony	Award	Category	Recipient(s) and nominee(s)	Result	Ref.
7 February 2020	Pakistan International Screen Awards	Best Television Play	Six Sigma Plus & Next Level Entertainment	Nominated	
7 February 2020	Pakistan International Screen Awards	Best Television Director	Syed Wajahat Hussain	Nominated	
7 February 2020	Pakistan International Screen Awards	Best Television Actor - Critics choice	Affan Waheed	Nominated	
7 February 2020	Pakistan International Screen Awards	Best Television Actress - Critics choice	Hira Mani	Nominated	
7 February 2020	Pakistan International Screen Awards	Best OST	Aima Baig and Nabeel Shaukat Ali	Nominated	
31 December 2020	LUX Style Awards	Best Emerging Talent	Haroon Shahid	Nominated	
