= Sun Yaara =

Pakistani television series

- Genre: Romance; Family drama
- Based on: Kuch Menu Marnda Shoq Vi Si by Asia Mirza
- Written by: Asia Mirza
- Directed by: Danish Nawaz
- Starring: JJunaid Khan; Hira Mani; Zarnish Khan
- Opening theme: Sun yaara Sun yaara by Junaid Khan and Damia Farooq
- Country of origin: Pakistan
- Original language: Urdu
- No. of episodes: 28

Production
- Producers: Humayun Saeed; Shahzad Nasib
- Running time: 42 minutes
- Production company: Six Sigma Plus

Original release
- Network: ARY Digital
- Release: 2 January – 17 July 2017

Sun Yaara (Urdu: سُن یارا, lit. 'Listen, Friend') is a Pakistani drama television series that aired on ARY Digital from 2 January to 17 July 2017. It is directed by Danish Nawaz, written by Asia Mirza and produced by Humayun Saeed and Shahzad Nasib under Six Sigma Plus. It stars Junaid Khan, Hira Salman and Zarnish Khan.

== Plot ==
Sun Yaara begins with two families who are all set to meet on a wedding. Roshni who lives in Rawalpindi comes to Karachi to attend the wedding of Lalarukh aka Lali – her father’s first cousin. Though she has been aloof from her relatives for some time, the trip is an opportunity for her to bond with the family.

Once she reaches Karachi, she injures her leg and everyone in the house gets busy taking care of her. Junaid Khan who’s playing the character of Talal is a very snobby doctor and Lalarukh’s brother. He is furious when he is called home for such a petty issue of looking at Roshni’s sprained leg.

The wedding starts and Tania, Saif's sister, tries sticking to Talal but he avoids her. Lali's rukhsati happens and she goes to her in-laws house. Saif loves her but is unable to express his love in front of his family. Saif's mother is good to Lali only if it's about her interest. She asks Lali's family for Hina's hand for Mohib, Saif younger brother who is returning from Jeddah, but they learn that Hina's marriage is fixed with Afaq, Shahla's son. Lali's in-laws get angry over her for this. She gets pregnant and Talal and his mother visit her and bring gifts where Tania tries to come close to him and he ignores her. Saif's family is invited to dinner at Sikander Villa and are informed that Talal will come to pick them up but Talal refuses and Khurram picks them. The next day Roshni's father has a heart attack. Talal reaches Rawalpindi to console Dado and Roshni. Asad recovers and Roshni enjoys rain and Talal and she have a sweet moment. Talal advises Roshni to stay strong and returns to Karachi. Tania and her elder sister (Saima) along with Lali come to stay at Sikander Villa for Hina's engagement. On the way only Talal and Tania are in the car and when she openly flirts with him and leans on his shoulder he slaps her. When Tania goes to give milk to Talal at night, she closes the door from inside. Talal fails to understand her plan and she tells everyone that he tried to misbehave with her. Talal's family believes him but Saif and his family keeps a condition that Lali will go back to her in-laws house only if Talal marries Tania to which Talal disagrees. Lali gets divorced and when this news reaches Roshni she calls Talal to know what has happened but Talal scolds her and says that there problems will not be solved by telling her. Talal goes Pindi and it is decided that Roshni will accompany him back to Karachi but before that Asad passes away.

Some years pass and Talal and Lali try to make each other agree for marriage but both disagree. After many tries, Rafia orders Talal to marry Roshni as she is a complete girl and not like Tania, or else she will get Roshni married to Khurram. After much reluctance, Talal finally agrees on the condition that only nikkah will be done and rukhsati will be done by his wish. Their nikkah is done. On the same night Talal and Roshni meet in the garden and he tells her that Lali loves her a lot and want to see her happy upon which she asks about his love for her, he leaves from there without answering her question.

Lali meets Tania while shopping who tells her about her marriage with Haroon and Saif's second marriage with Sabohi. Tania tries to contact her and tells Saif about his son Ayaan and shows his pics.

Hina's marriage is done. Talal's best friend Mustafa returns from abroad. He has loved Lali from the beginning but could not express. He talks to Talal about the same and Talal tries to make Lali agree for marriage by saying that he will divorce Roshni if she don't marry Mustafa. Lali agrees but Roshni overhears this and feels used. She returns to Pindi after Lali's marriage and acts rude to Talal. In the meantime, Talal agrees for rukhsati but Roshni disagrees. After much effort rukhsati is done. On the wedding night Roshni blames Talal for using her and cries.

Lali starts liking Mustafa but Saif comes and forces her to let her meet his son. When Lali goes to meet him, Mustafa sees her and sends her back to Karachi forever, which she doesn't tell her family but Talal senses something wrong. Saif gets to know everything that his family has destroyed his married life and opens the door by which Tania falls and suffers miscarriage. Haroon leaves her at her mother's house and takes Sabohi with him.

Roshni feels that Tania is still there in Talal's life as she don't know the reason of Lali's divorce and Tania framing Talal. Hina tells her everything and Roshni tries to talk to Talal but he ignores her. They decide to go for dinner. While they are at dinner Ayaan gets kidnapped by Saif and Talal and Khurram go to Saif's house but find that he has not returned home since yesterday and Saif's mother asks Talal to believe them to which Talal replies that what they have done to them after that they cannot believe him and he will find Saif from anywhere and will not leave him. Two days have passed and Ayaan is not found. Talal has told police not to torture Saif's sister and mother. Roshni informs Mustafa about Ayaan's kidnap. Mustafa comes to Karachi. He tells Lali to meet Saif and know his demand. When they meet Mustafa asks Lali and Saif to reunite. Mustafa realizes that he was wrong and apologised to Lali but she doesn't accept his apology. One night suddenly gate opens and Ayaan comes. Roshni watches Ayaan meeting Mustafa from window and runs downstairs to tell Lali but slips from stairs . Talal holds her and asks her where was she going in hurry. She tells him that Ayaan has returned but he is lost in her. He tells her to walk carefully and what if she falls then she says that he is there to take care of her. It is revealed that Saif has returned Ayaan as he know that there is no place for him in Lali's heart and he is repenting for his mistake of divorcing Lali. Mustafa and Lali's misunderstanding gets cleared and all start preparation of Khurram's marriage. Khurram's nikkah is done and he asks Talal for the rukhsati to be done at the same time as well. Talal goes to talk to his mother and Roshni says that all the boys had planned it as they were whispering since a long time and Hina agrees. Talal comes and tells Khurram that Laiba's dad refused for rukhsati as they are not prepared yet. Khurram asks what to do now. Talal advises him to run away with the bride. Khurram again asks what to do, not believing what his brother is saying as it is against his usual ideas. Talal and Mustafa both advise him again to run away. Khurram asks Laiba to run but, she is reluctant however, agrees when Khurram tells her that if she loves him she will run with him. The show ends with Khurram running away with Laiba and Talal, Mustafa, Afaq, Lali, Hina, and Roshni protecting them and supporting them.

== Cast ==
- Junaid Khan as Dr. Talal Sikandar
- Hira Mani as Roshanay aka Roshni, Talal's wife
- Zarnish Khan as Lalarukh aka Lali Mustafa Khan, Talal and Khurram's sister
- Faris Shafi as Saif ur Rehman, Lali's first husband
- Ghana Ali as Tania Haroon, Saif's sister
- Hassan Niazi as Mustafa Khan, Talal's best friend and Lali's husband
- Minal Khan as Hina Afaq, Talal's niece
- Asim Mehmood as Khurram Sikandar, Talal and Lali's brother
- Ismat Iqbal as Saif's mother
- Nida Mumtaz as Rafia, Talal's mother
- Laila Wasti as Saima, Saif's elder sister
- Samina Ahmed as Amna, Rafia's sister and Roshni's grandmother
- Maham Javed as Laiba, Khurram's wife
- Qaiser Khan Nizamani as Asad, Roshni's father
- Omi Butt as Afaq, Hina's husband and Laiba's brother

== Accolades ==
- Damia Farooq nominated at 16th Lux Style Awards for Best Original Soundtrack
