= Geo Kahani =

Pakistani television station

Geo Kahani HD جیو کہانی
- Country: Pakistan
- Network: Geo TV
- Headquarters: Karachi, Sindh, Pakistan

Programming
- Picture format: (1080i 16:9, HDTV MPEG-4)

Ownership
- Owner: Mir Shakil-ur-Rahman; Jang Media Group; Mir Ibrahim Rahman; Geo Entertainment; Asad Qureshi; Abdullah Kadwani
- Sister channels: List: Geo Entertainment; Geo News; Geo Super

History
- Launched: 16 May 2013; 13 years ago
- Replaced: AAG TV

Links
- Website: geokahani.tv

Availability

Streaming media
- Live Streaming: geokahani.tv/live

Geo Kahani (Urdu: جیو کہانی) is an entertainment channel of Geo network, broadcasting in Urdu. Some of its popular dramas are Naagin, Champa Aur Chambeli and Kiran. Ending the four-year run of Geo Tez, Geo Kahani began its transmission in the UK on 11 August 2017, and ended that in 2020.

== Current programming ==
=== Reruns of ended series ===
- Tum Se Hi Talluq Hai
- Banno
- Darr Khuda Say
- Kahin Deep Jaley
- Kurulus Osman Season 2
- Saibaan
- Dolly Darling
- Nadaaniyaan

== Former programming ==
=== Original programming ===
==== Dramas ====
- Aas
- Champa Aur Chambeli
- Devraniyaan
- Ghar Aik Jannat
- Jeevan Saathi
- Naagin
- Kiran
- Kyun Hai Tu
- Soha Aur Savera

==== Talk shows ====
- Subh-e-Pakistan
- Subh Ki Kahani
- Iftar Mulaqat

=== Acquired Programming ===
==== From Geo Entertainment ====
- Bharosa Pyaar Tera
- Raaz-E-Ulfat
- Ghar Ek Jannat
- Jeevan Saathi
- Mann Ke Moti
- Yeh Zindagi Hai
- Yeh Kaisi Mohabbat Hai
- Malika-e-Aliya
- Malika-e-Aliya Season 2
- Umm-E-Haniya
- Roshni
- Saaya
- Nanhi
- Ay Dil Tu Bata
- Kurulus Osman Season 1
- Meri Maa
- Naadaniyaan
- Piya Naam Ka Diya
- Yaariyan
- Khoobseerat
- Kahin Deep Jaley
- Khaali Haath
- Munafiq
- Joru Ka Ghulam
- Sangdil
- Kam Zarf
- Aap Ki Kaneez
- Bandhay Aik Dor Say
- Ab Dekh Khuda Kya Karta Hai
- Mohabbat Tumse Nafrat Hai
- Inteqam
- Saaya (season 2)
- Yaariyan
- Romeo Weds Heer

==== Indian ====
- Badi Bahu
- Bhoomi Kay Sapnay
- CID
- Darr Sabko Lagta Hai
- Doli Armaano Ki
- Dosri Shaadi
- Mrs.Kaushik Ki Paanch Bahuein
- Ek Tha Raja Ek Thi Rani
- Haasil
- Jeet Gayi Toh Piya Morey
- Jodha Akbar
- Kaala Teeka
- Kumkum Bhagya
- Kundali Bhagya
- Mehrunnisa
- Razia Sultan
- Satrangi Sasural
- Suno Pratibha
- Yeh Kahan Aa Gaye Hum
- Yeh Vaada Raha

==== Turkish ====
- Intekam
- Iffet
- Mera Ishq
- Mera Sultan
- Muhabbat
- Noor
- Sheharzaad
- Bewafai
