= Ramz-e-Ishq =

2019 Pakistani TV series

- Written by: Misbah Nosheen
- Directed by: Siraj ul Haq
- Starring: Mikaal Zulfiqar; Hiba Bukhari; Kiran Haq
- Country of origin: Pakistan
- Original language: Urdu
- No. of episodes: 32

Production
- Producers: Abdullah Kadwani; Asad Qureshi
- Production locations: Karachi, Sindh
- Camera setup: Multi-camera setup
- Production company: 7th Sky Entertainment

Original release
- Network: Geo Entertainment
- Release: 2 August 2019 – 10 February 2020

Ramz-e-Ishq (Urdu: رمز عشق, lit. 'Secret of Love') was a 2019 Pakistani romantic drama television series, written by Siraj ul Haque and produced by Abdullah Kadwani and Asad Qureshi under their banner 7th Sky Entertainment. It starred Mikaal Zulfiqar, Hiba Bukhari and Kiran Haq.

Mikaal Zulfiqar and Kiran Haq made their fifth on-screen appearance by this serial after their appearances in Tum Meray Hi Rehna, Maan, Sangat and Tum Mere Kya Ho.

== Synopsis ==
Roshni is the obedient, good-natured and responsible daughter of Wajahat Ali and Khadija who sacrifices her love for Rayan in favor of the husband chosen for her by her parents. When Wajahat passes away in an unexpected accident, Roshni's estranged grandfather Hashmat Ali becomes her guardian. Advised by Safia, Wajahat's sister who secretly resented her brother for her own failed marriage, Hashmat cancels Roshni's upcoming marriage. Respectful of her grandfather and wanting to heal her family's old differences, Roshni sacrifices her own choice once again and agrees to marry Umar, the son of the family's munshi.

Instead of being embraced as a family member, things go from bad to worse for Roshni when she and her husband are treated extremely poorly by her spiteful aunt and her daughter Rania. Will Roshni continue to suffer at the hands of her own grandfather and aunt? Will Rayan, Roshni's cousin end up marrying Rania? Or will Roshni be able to get her life back on track somehow and overcome the obstacles that have been put in her path by her very own family? Or will she back down?

== Cast ==
- Mikaal Zulfiqar as Rayaan
- Hiba Bukhari as Roshni
- Kiran Haq as Raania
- Faryal Mehmood as Sadia
- Abid Ali as Rayaan's grandfather
- Nida Mumtaz as Safiya
- Aijaz Aslam as Wajahat Ali (Dead)
- Zainab Qayyum as Khadija Begum (Dead)
- Gohar Rasheed as Umer
- Shabbir Jan as Rayaan's father
- Azra Mohyeddin as Ayesha, Rayaan's mother
- Shaista Jabeen as Umer's mother (Dead)
- Manzoor Qureshi as Sadia's father

== Awards and nominations ==
Year	Award	Category	Recipient(s)	Result
2020	LUX Style Awards 2020	Best OST	Ramz-e-Ishq	Nominated
