= Noor-e-Zindagi =

Pakistani television drama series

- Genre: Family drama Romantic drama
- Created by: Abdullah Kadwani; Asad Qureshi
- Written by: Sarwat Nazir
- Directed by: Siraj ul Haq
- Country of origin: Pakistan
- Original language: Urdu
- No. of episodes: 29

Production
- Producers: Abdullah Kadwani; Asad Qureshi
- Camera setup: Multi-camera setup
- Production company: 7th Sky Entertainment

Original release
- Network: Geo Entertainment
- Release: 15 July 2016 – 27 January 2017

Noor-e-Zindagi (Urdu: نور زندگی, lit. 'Light of Life') is a Pakistani drama serial that first aired on Geo Entertainment on 15 July 2016. It was produced by Abdullah Kadwani and Asad Qureshi. The turmoil of marriage for spouses of opposite nature and a woman's noble struggle to save her marriage is the focus of the serial.

== Cast ==
- Aisha Khan as Noor Jahan
- Syed Jibran as Saleem
- Shakeel as Noor's father
- Noman Habib as Waseem (Saleem's younger brother)
- Sajida Syed as Saleem and Waseem's mother
- Esha Noor as Gulshan
- Shahvaar Ali Khan as Faisal
- Farah Nadir as Gulshan's mother
- Anam Tanveer as Gulshan (Gulshan's elder sister)
- Ayesha Khan as Noor's mother
- Humaira Bano as Noor's elder sister's (Mehrunissa) mother-in-law
- Saleem Mairaj as Saleem's friend
- Sumaiyya Bukhsh as Mano (Saleem's younger sister)

== Soundtrack ==
The original soundtrack of Noor-e-Zindagi was composed and sung by Shuja Haider and Rosemary. The song is available on Patari.

== Broadcast and Release ==
The serial premiered on Geo Entertainment, airing the episode at prime time, from 15 July 2015. It was also aired on Geo Kahani. Since 20 April 2020, it became available for streaming on Amazon Prime. It's also available for streaming on MX Player in India.

== Awards and nominations ==
Date of ceremony	Award	Category	Recipient(s) and nominee(s)	Result	Ref.
17 September 2017	IPPA Awards London 2017	Best Television Director	Siraj-ul-Haque	Nominated	
17 September 2017	IPPA Awards London 2017	Best Television Play	Noor-e-Zindagi	Nominated	
17 September 2017	IPPA Awards London 2017	Best Television Actor	Syed Jibran	Nominated	
17 September 2017	IPPA Awards London 2017	Best Television Actress	Aisha Khan	Won	
