= Sumaiyya Bukhsh =

Pakistani actress

- سمیعہ بخش
- Occupation: Actress
- Years active: 2016–present

Sumaiyya Bukhsh is a Pakistani actress. She is known for her roles in dramas such as Kam Zarf, Main Agar Chup Hoon, Inteqam, Noor-e-Zindagi and Be Rehem.

== Career ==
She made her debut as an actress in 2016 on Geo Entertainment. She did a supporting role in drama Noor-e-Zindagi as Mano and Rishtay Kachay Dhagoon Se as Hareem. In 2017 she did a lead role in drama Jalti Barish as Sarwat. In 2018 she did three lead roles in dramas, she played as Hina with Rizwan Ali Jaffri in drama Mera Ghar Aur Ghardari who gets mistreated by her husband's first wife. She played lead role along with Omer Shahzad in Be Rehem drama as Ashi, who is abused and tortured by her husband and her pairing with Omer Shahzad became popular.

She also played lead role in drama Rabbaway as Zeerat an innocent girl who wishes to marry her lover. In 2019 she played lead role as Hania in Mera Kiya Qasoor as a victim daughter who is mistreated by her father, in the same year she appeared in drama Kam Zarf as Mona the youngest sibling who wants to see her elder sister happy, she also played lead role as Maha in drama Soya Mera Naseeb.

== Filmography ==
=== Television ===
Year	Title	Role	Network
2016	Noor-e-Zindagi	Mano	Geo Entertainment
2016	Faltu Larki	Muneeza	A-Plus
2016	Izn-e-Rukhsat	Maira	Geo Entertainment
2016	Jhoot	Maria	Hum TV
2017	Rishtay Kachay Dhagoon Se	Hareem	A-Plus
2017	Tumhare Hain	Anum	ARY Digital
2017	Jalti Barish	Sarwat	TV One
2018	Mera Ghar Aur Ghardari	Hina	Geo Entertainment
2018	Be Rehem	Ashi	Geo Entertainment
2018	Rabbaway	Zeerat	Bol Entertainment
2019	Mera Kiya Qasoor	Hania	A-Plus
2019	Kam Zarf	Mona	Geo TV
2019	Soya Mera Naseeb	Maha	Hum TV
2020	Mein Rani	Fozia	Express Entertainment
2020	Chamak Damak	Rameen	Hum TV
2020	Main Agar Chup Hoon	Shifa	Geo Entertainment
2021	Shehnai	Shama	ARY Digital
2021	Dikhawa Season 2	Wareesha	Geo Entertainment
2021	Makafaat Season 3	Taniya	Geo Entertainment
2022	Inteqam	Zoya	Geo Entertainment
2024	Be Rung	Aimal	Hum TV
2026	Madaar	Zoha	Green Entertainment

=== Telefilm ===
Year	Title	Role
2018	Mai Cheemi Ka Faisla	Shabbo
