= Madaar =

2026 Pakistani television series

- Genre: Family drama; Romance
- Written by: Zartasha Mehmood
- Directed by: Syed Faisal Bukhari
- Starring: Humayoun Ashraf; Sumaiyya Bukhsh; Nida Mumtaz; Fawad Jalal; Mizna Waqas
- Country of origin: Pakistan
- Original language: Urdu
- No. of seasons: 1
- No. of episodes: 39

Production
- Producer: Multiverse Entertainment
- Production locations: Karachi, Pakistan
- Camera setup: Multi-camera setup
- Running time: 38 minutes

Original release
- Network: Green Entertainment
- Release: 23 September 2026

Madaar is a 2026 Pakistani romantic drama television drama series produced by Multiverse Entertainment. The series premiered on Green Entertainment on 23 September 2026. It stars Humayoun Ashraf and Sumaiyya Bukhsh in lead roles, alongside Nida Mumtaz, Fawad Jalal, Mizna Waqas and Rizwan Ali Jaffri.

== Plot ==
The story centres on Samar, a young man who assumes responsibility for his family following his father's death. Using the income from his growing information technology business, he supports his mother and siblings. However, his financial assistance gradually creates expectations among his relatives, leading to disagreements and conflicts within the household. Samar's circumstances change when he meets Zoha, an independent woman who has reservations about marriage. Their initial differences gradually develop into a romantic relationship. As family rivalries, jealousy and competing interests complicate their lives, Samar faces the challenge of balancing his responsibilities towards his family with his own happiness and self-respect.

== Cast ==
- Humayoun Ashraf as Samar
- Sumaiyya Bukhsh as Zoha
- Nida Mumtaz as Munazza
- Fawad Jalal as Feroze Ahmed
- Mizna Waqas as Haleema
- Afraz Rasool as Wali Khan
- Natasha Ali as Nighat
- Maya Naz as Saman
- Shazia Gohar as Zainab
- Rizwan Ali Jaffri as Jalal

== Production ==
The project was announced by Green Entertainment through promotional teasers in August 2026. The initial teaser featured Humayoun Ashraf and Sumaiyya Bukhsh as lead cast and Faisal Bukhari as the director and Zartasha Mehmood as the writer. Multiverse Entertainment presented the series.

== Reception ==
In November 2026, the series attracted public discussion following the circulation of a romantic scene featuring the lead characters during their honeymoon sequence. The scene received mixed reactions on social media, with some viewers criticising its inclusion.
