= Gumrah =

Gumrah or Gumraah (lit. 'Astray') may refer to:

- Gumrah (1963 film), 1963 Indian romantic-drama film by B. R. Chopra
- Gumrah (1993 film), 1993 Indian action- crime film by Mahesh Bhatt
- Gumraah (2023 film), 2023 Indian crime-thriller film by Vardhan Ketkar
- Gumrah: End of Innocence, an Indian crime television series that began airing in March 2012
- Gumrah (TV series), a Pakistani romantic television series that began airing in September 2017
