= Omair Rana =

Pakistani actor and theatre director (born 1978)

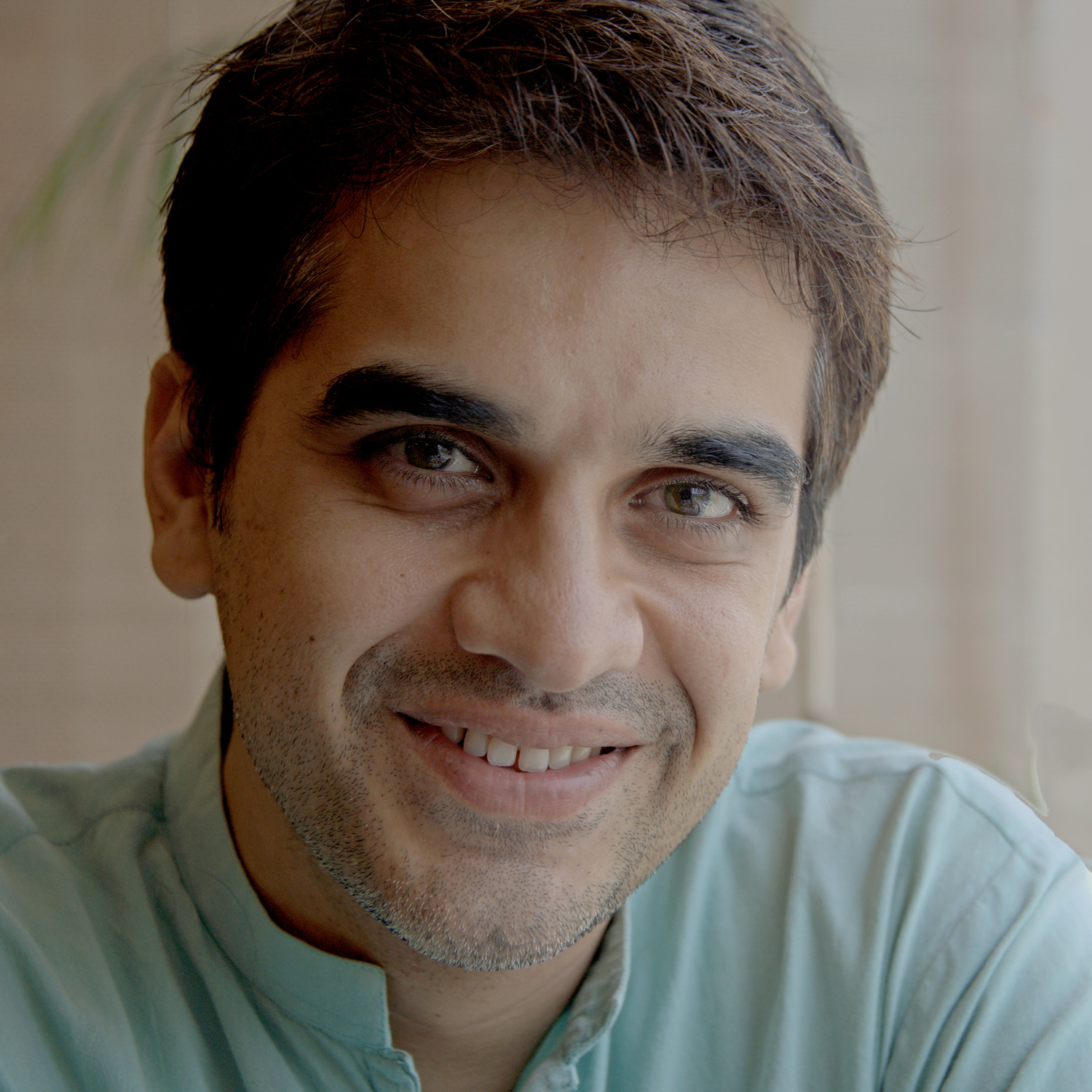
- Born: Omair Tahir Rana; 31 January 1978 (age 48); Al Ain, UAE
- Education: London School of Economics (External Program, University College Lahore)
- Occupation: Actor
- Height: 1.85 m (6 ft 1 in)
- Spouse: Maira Rana (married 2002–present)

Omair Tahir Rana (born 31 January 1978) is a Pakistani actor and theatre director. He also directs plays in educational institutes, notably One Flew Over The Cuckoo's Nest (2014) and Life of Galileo (2013) at Lahore Grammar School Johar Town campus. He runs his theatre company by the name of Real Entertainment Productions (REP) that was founded in 2000 and has done over 50 plays.

Omair Rana was appointed as a CLF Goodwill Ambassador by the Children's Literature Festival on 30 July 2019.

== Early life ==
He had his early education in Al Ain, UAE, Al Ain English-speaking school, which was instrumental in inculcating his love for theatre. In the course of his career development, he also undertook a number of internships including one with the Lahore Chamber of Commerce & Industry.

== Career ==
=== Theatre ===
He is a theater actor in the region who has made a significant contribution in the field of teaching dramatics Art at a number of institutions, including introducing IGCSE Drama to Pakistan in 2009.

=== Cinema ===
As a screen actor he has also worked in films such as Chambaili (2013) and Tamanna (2014).

=== Television ===
Making his TV debut in 1995 from T.V series "Teen Bata Teen", he won a lot of recognition for his performances in dramas like Maan (2015), Sang-e-Mar Mar (2016) and O Rangreza (2017), and in 2018 starred in the much anticipated Hum TV period drama Aangan.

In 2020, he played the villainous and lewd stepfather of the protagonist in the romance Pyar Ke Sadqay. In 2023, he played the role of the father of the main lead in the drama Ishq Murshid. In 2025, he had a supporting role in the Ramadan special drama Ishq Di Chashni.

== Filmography ==
=== Films ===
Year	Title	Role	Director	Additional notes
2005	Toba Tek Singh	Bishan Singh	Afia Nathaniel	Short film; based on the short story by Manto
2013	Chambaili	Rashid	Ismail Jilani	Film feature debut
2013	65	Soldier/husband	Steven Moore	TV short; based on the Indo-Pakistani War of 1965
2014	Tamanna	Rizwan Ahmed	Steven Moore	
2015	Dukhtar	Zarak Khan	Afia Nathaniel	
2022	Kamli	Nadir Malik	Sarmad Khoosat	
2023	Gunjal	News Editor	Shoaib Sultan	
TBA	Driven	TBA	Michael Hudson	
2027	Inspector Jamshed: The Secret Parchment	Inspector Jamshed	Fahd Nur	Based on the novel Inspector Jamshed series

=== Television serials ===
Year	Title	Role	Channel
1998	Teen Bata Teen (Season 2)	Jony	PTV
2012	Samjhauta Express	Karan Khosla	PTV Home
2013	Ullu Baraye Farokht Nahi	Sir Chauhan	Hum TV
2014	Ek Mohabbat Kay Baad		ARY Digital
2014	Do Saal Ki Aurat	Umar	Hum TV
2015	Dilfareb	Zain	Geo Entertainment
2015	Tum Mere Kya Ho	Khalid	PTV Home
2015	Maan	Arslan	Hum TV
2016	Sang-e-Mar Mar	Safiullah Khan	Hum TV
2016	Piya Be Dardi	Sahir	A Plus Entertainment
2017	Kitni Girhain Baqi Hain	Sikander (ep. 31)	Hum TV
2017	O Rangreza	Waji Kamal	Hum TV
2017	Mujhay Jeenay Do	Ittefaq	Urdu 1
2017	Qurban	Kaysar Khan	ARY Digital
2018	De Ijazat		Hum TV
2018	Zann Mureed	Sajjad	Hum TV
2018	Aangan	Mazhar Chacha	Hum TV
2020	Pyar Ke Sadqay	Sarwar	Hum TV
2021	Dil Na Umeed To Nahi	Zulfi	PTV Home TV One
2021	Hum Kahan Ke Sachay Thay	Mansoor (Cameo appearance)	Hum TV
2022	Sang-e-Mah	Mastaan Singh	Hum TV
2022	Pinjra	Javed Rehman	ARY Digital
2023	Benaqab	Doctor	Hum TV
2023	Muhabbat Gumshuda Meri	Mohammad Ibrahim	Hum TV
2023	Ishq Murshid	Dawood Ali Khan	Hum TV
2025	Ishq Di Chashni	Sheikh Farasat	Green Entertainment
2026	Aik Mohabbat Aur		Green Entertainment

=== Webseries ===
Year	Title	Role	Notes
2020	Churails	Jameel Khan	Released on Zee5
