= Haya Ke Daaman Main =

Pakistani television series

- Logo
- Genre: Romance film Romantic comedy Soap opera
- Written by: Adam Azeen
- Screenplay by: Zakir Ahmed
- Directed by: Syed Wahab Jaffari
- Starring: Sukaina Khan; Mariyam Nafees; Nida khan; Jahanzeb Khan; Hammad Farooqui
- Opening theme: Lyrics by Sabir Zafar
- Country of origin: Pakistan
- Original language: Urdu
- No. of seasons: 1
- No. of episodes: 119

Production
- Executive producer: Momina Duraid
- Producer: Momina Duraid
- Cinematography: Nadeem Kashmiri; Azhar Ali
- Editors: Muhammad Adeel Khalid; Ikhlaq Ahmad
- Camera setup: Multi-camera setup
- Running time: 11 – 20 minutes
- Production company: MD Productions

Original release
- Network: Hum TV
- Release: 30 March – 16 September 2016

Related
- Ishq-e-Benaam; Bad Gumaan; Zindagi Tujh Ko Jiya; Mana Ka Gharana; Maan; Kathputli

Haya Ke Daaman Main (Urdu: حیا کے دامن میں; lit: In Haya's lap) is a Pakistani romantic television soap opera first aired on 30 March 2016 on Hum TV. Written by Adam Azeen, it is directed by Syed Wahab Jaffari. It is produced by Momina Duraid in the MD Productions company. It aired every Monday to Friday 7:30 pm PST. It is edited by Muhammad Adeel Khalid and Ikhlaq Ahmad. Its chief editor is Mahmood Ali and assistant editors are Saqib Qureshi and Bilal Javed. The show later reran on Hum Sitaray.

== Outline ==
The story is about Haya (Sukaina Khan), who is the daughter of Azeem (Muhammad Qavi Khan), younger sister of Aarish (Syed Waseem Tirmaizi) and Farid (Hannan Samed). She is friend of Rija (Mariyam Nafees) who is in love with Babar (Hammad Farooqui), son of (Fazila Qazi). Aarish is to marry Mizna (Nida Khan) who is disliked by Haya & Rija. This leads to bring sadness in Haya's life. While her brother, Farid is married to Laina, sister of Shan (Jahanzeb Khan) and daughter of (Fouzia Mushtaq). Mizna is daughter of Mehmood (Behroze Sabzwari) and Ismat (Ambar Wajid). Her mother Ismat is a relative of Anwari (Afshan Qureshi). Conditions change when Haya, who hates Babar marries him and breaks Rija's heart. Babar's grandma, who holds a hatred for Babar's mother, convinces Babar to marry Rija in order to kick Haya out and win against his mother. Haya's brother Farid ( Hanan Samed) goes to Rija's house and blames her for trying to marry Babar and destroying Haya's marriage. Babar gets written permission from a broken Haya so that he can finally marry Rija. Rija's parents become angry with her and lock her in a room until Babar's grandmother calls the police and has Rija's father arrested. Babar marries Rija and a rivalry ensues between Haya and Rija who were once best friends, Haya keeping her marriage together and Rija forcefully taking Haya's place.

== Cast ==
- Sukaina Khan as Haya
- Mariyam Nafees as Rija
- Nida Khan as Mizna
- Waseem Tirmazi as Aarish
- Hanan Samed as Farid
- Behroze Sabzwari as Mehmood
- Ambar Wajid as Ismat
- Afshan Qureshi as Anwari
- Jahanzeb Khan as Shan
- Fouzia Mushtaq as Laina & Shan's mother (Dead)
- Hammad Farooqui as Babar
- Fazila Qazi as Mahjabeen
- Beena Chaudhary as Rija's mother
- Muhammad Qavi Khan as Azeem; Haya, Aarish & Farid's father (Dead)
- Afraz Rasool as Arslan
- Sangeeta as Babar and Arslan's grandmother

== See also ==
- List of programs broadcast by Hum TV
- 2016 in Pakistani television
