= Man-o-Salwa =

- Promotional DVD Poster
- Also known as: Tere Ishq Mein
- Genre: Drama; Romance
- Based on: Man-o-Salwa by Umera Ahmad
- Written by: Umera Ahmad
- Directed by: Babar Javed
- Starring: Resham; Noman Ijaz; Faisal Qureshi; Ayesha Khan; Imran Abbas; Fatima Effendi; (for entire cast see the section on cast below)
- Opening theme: Tere Ishq Mein (sung by Zila Khan and written by Sabir Zafar)
- Country of origin: Pakistan
- Original language: Urdu
- No. of seasons: 1

Production
- Producer: Momina Duraid
- Production locations: Pakistan; Sydney, Australia
- Running time: Approx. 35–40 minutes

Original release
- Network: Hum TV
- Release: 2007 – 2007

Man-o-Salwa (Urdu: من و سلویٰ; transl. Manna from Heaven) is an Urdu language Pakistani telenovela broadcast in 2007 by Hum TV, based on Umera Ahmad's novel of the same name. The telenovela, which stars Resham, Faisal Qureshi, and Noman Ijaz, is directed by Babar Javed and produced by Momina Duraid.

It was broadcast in India by Zindagi under the title Tere Ishq Mein, premiering on 13 October 2014. At the 7th Lux Style Awards, it won in the category of Best TV Play - Satellite.

== Plot ==
Zainab is a beautiful girl deeply in love with her cousin Sheraz and is committed to him. But Sheraz witnesses certain events which he misinterprets and hence, believes Zainab is having affairs with other men. Thus, he decides to break the engagement only to be told the truth and pacified and finds a place for himself in the good books of his senior at the office. Sheraz makes new friends at the office who misguide him by suggesting that he should marry a girl from a wealthy family to ensure a life of luxury and wealth for himself. Lured by these thoughts, Sheraz feels the need to break off his engagement with Zainab. At the same time, Sheraz also senses that his senior is thinking of getting him married to her daughter (Sheena). Sheraz starts devising a plan to get rid of Zainab and also succeeds in creating a bad image of Zainab in the eyes of his parents. Soon later, Sheraz's senior visits his home and proposes to him to marry his daughter. Sheraz and his parents readily agree to the proposal, leading his engagement with Zainab to be broken up, which deeply disturbs Zainab. Sheraz also spreads rumours and false stories about Zainab in the neighbourhood, and she becomes infamous overnight in her entire locality. Determined to take revenge, Zainab begins her life afresh.

She leaves home despite opposition from her family and begins working as a model and later as an actress under the nom de plume Parizaad. Parizaad becomes widely popular among the masses, but still, Zainab is viewed negatively by her family and society. Her father dies, and her family disowns her. But later, her mother, her elder sister, Zohra and her younger sister, Ayesha go through deep turmoil. Zohra's husband leaves her with three children. Her mother, deprived of food and electricity, forgives Zainab and stays with her. Zainab even saves Zohra's house.

Much later, Zainab gets an offer for a film produced by a man named Karam. She is called to Sydney in Australia, for a meeting with him. Excited about the project, which appears promising to Zainab, she leaves soon for Australia. On the other hand, Sheraz is living an unhappy life with his wife, and can't even end his the marriage as he owes a lot of money to his father-in-law, which he would have to repay in case of a divorce. In Australia, Zainab, upon meeting and spending time with Karam, begins to develop feelings for him and also gets to know that he is a huge fan and adorer of her. She finds him to be one of a kind and loves him more because he doesn't take advantage and is also not bothered about the rumours regarding Parizaad spread in the entire industry. But as the project gets cancelled, Zainab returns to Pakistan.

Upon returning to Pakistan, Zainab happens to meet Sheraz once again after years and is determined to take revenge. She succeeds in getting him involved in a scandal. Sheraz is put behind bars and becomes infamous in society overnight. Upon knowing this, Sheraz's wife divorces him, and she, along with her father, leaving him behind bars. Sheraz pleads with many acquaintances to help him but all refuse him, and is left with no way out. Following this incident, Zainab retires from modeling and acting and travels to Sydney to meet and be with Karam.

Meanwhile, in Australia, Karam's mother forces him to marry a girl named Zari, who is much younger than him. And until the marriage, both remain unaware neither had given their full approval. And after getting married, when Karam learns the truth that his wife loves a man named Jamal, he allows her to break up the marriage and be with the man of her love. And when Zainab arrives, Karam is once again single, and they begin to spend time with each other and slowly develop a feeling of love for each other. But when Karam meets his mother and confesses his wish to marry Zainab, she insults and demeans her, forcing Zainab to leave the house. But in her absence, Karam asserts his will and determination to marry Zainab. He also claims that his mother and brother have used him just for wealth to fulfill their needs and to uplift their social status. Karam leaves tormented in search of Zainab. And while looking for her, Karam finds her belongings at various points on a path that leads to his own house. But by the time Karam reaches home, Zainab had already committed suicide by jumping from the balcony, leaving Karam all alone again.

== Cast ==
- Resham as Zainab
- Faisal Qureshi as Sheraz
- Noman Ijaz as Karam
- Ayesha Khan as Zareen "Zari", Jamal's wife
- Imran Abbas as Jamal, Zari's Husband
- Juggan Kazim as Sheena
- Fatima Effendi
- Uzma Gillani as Karam's mother
- Ismat Zaidi as Zainab's mother
- Shahzad Reza as Zainab's father
- Sajida Syed as Sheraz's mother
- Rashid Farooqi as Sultan
- Zeba Ali as Ayesha
- Yasir Nawaz as Randhawa
- Tipu Sharif as Sohail

== Production ==
The principal photography for the serial took place in Australia.

== Lux Style Awards ==
- Best TV Play (Satellite)-Won
- Best TV Director (Satellite)-Babar Javed-Nominated
- Best TV Actress (Satellite)-Resham-Nominated
- Best TV Actor (Satellite)-Noman Ijaz-Nominated

== See also ==
- Noorpur Ki Rani
- Aashti
- Dil, Diya, Dehleez
- Manay Na Ye Dil
