= Mariyam Nafees =

Pakistani actress (born 1994)

- مریم نفیس
- Born: 22 February 1992 (age 34); Islamabad, Pakistan
- Occupation: Actress
- Years active: 2015–present
- Known for: Diyar-e-Dil (2015); Haya Ke Daaman Main (2016)
- Spouse: Aman Ahmed (m. 2022)

Mariyam Nafees (Urdu: مریم نفیس) is a Pakistani television actress. She made her television debut in Hum TV's Diyar-e-Dil as Zarminey and later appeared as Tabinda in Kuch Na Kaho.

== Career ==
Mariyam started her career in Diyar-e-Dil alongside Osman Khalid Butt, Maya Ali, Hareem Farooq, Abid Ali, and Sanam Saeed.

In Haya Ke Daaman Main, she appeared in the role of Rija as the friend of the titular Haya (Sukaina Khan).

== Television ==
Year	Serial	Role	Notes	Refs
2015	Diyar-e-Dil	Zarminey		
2015	Ishq-e-Benaam	Soha		
2016	Haya Ke Daaman Main	Rija		
2017	Kuch Na Kaho	Tabinda		
2017	Munkir	Anjum		
2017	Yaqeen Ka Safar	Khajista		
2018	Kabhi Band Kabhi Baja		Anthology series	
2019	Dil-e-Bereham	Ujala		
2019	Dil Kiya Karay	Faryal		
2019	Choti Choti Batain	Aliya	Story "Dil Hi To Hai"	
2019	Kam Zarf	Faria		
2019	Yaariyan	Sumbul		
2019	Makafaat		Episode 18	
2019	Bhook	Gaiti Araa		
2019	Haqeeqat	Amber	Episode "Muqadma"	
2019	Meray Mohsin	Nazia		
2019	Mohabbat Na Kariyo	Nida		
2020	Munafiq	Sobia		
2020	Jhooti	Saman		
2020	Fitrat	Alizeh		
2020	Meray Dost Meray Yaar Season 2	Feeha		
2021	Ishq Jalebi	Hina		
2021	Mohabbat Chor Di Maine	Sehar		
2023	Neem	Mariam		
2023	Siyaah	Amber	Episode "Raat Andheri"	

== Personal life ==
On 25 March 2022, Nafees married Aman Ahmed, a Pakistani filmmaker.
