= Sajida Syed =

Pakistani actress

- Born: Sajida Syed; 4 November 1950 (age 75); Karachi, Pakistan
- Education: University of Karachi
- Occupation: Actress
- Years active: 1975–present
- Children: 3

Sajida Syed (Urdu: ساجدہ سید) is a Pakistani actress. She is known for her roles in dramas Zaib-un-Nisa, Mere Khudaya, Darr Khuda Say, Khaas, Ab Dekh Khuda Kya Karta Hai, Saas Bahu, Jalan and Munafiq.

== Early life ==
Sajida was born on 4 November 1950, in Karachi. She graduated from University of Karachi with a bachelor's degree. Sajida has also worked at Radio Pakistan at Karachi.

== Career ==
Sajida made her acting debut on PTV in 1975. She is known for playing kind lead roles. She is known for her work in PTV drama Ana. She also appeared in the drama Khaas in 2019. In 2020 she appeared in the dramas Munafiq, Mohabbat Tujhe Alvida and Jalan.

== Personal life ==
Sajida is married and has three children.

== Filmography ==
=== Television ===
Year	Title	Role	Network
1984	Ana	Tara Begum	PTV
1984	Rishtay Aur Rastay	Zari Gul	PTV
1988	Yeh Shadi Nahi Ho Gi	Saira	PTV
1988	Seerhiyan	Gul Bano	PTV
1989	Nasri Ganay	Asma	PTV
1991	Gurez	Jameela	PTV
1991	Nasheman	Iffat	PTV
1992	Zindagi	Sadia	PTV
1992	Baat Banaye Na Bane	Asif's mother	PTV
1993	Mera Nam Hai Muhabbat	Razia	PTV
1995	Ba Adab Ba Mulahiza Hoshiyar	Bano	PTV
1995	Chand Grehan	Ms. Babar	PTV
1998	Shaam Sey Phelay	Tahira	PTV
1998	Dhoop Mein Sawan	Mahmooda	PTV
1998	Jinnah Se Quaid	Mithi bai Jinnah	PTV
1999	Sarmaya	Omer's mother	PTV
1999	Poora Chand	Sultana	PTV
2000	Nasri Ganay	Asma	PTV
2000	Zaib-un-Nisa	Rasheeda	PTV
2001	Panchhi	Khalida	PTV
2001	Khandan	Tahira	PTV
2002	Phir Youn Love Hua	Uzma	PTV
2003	Chand Chehra	Iffat Jahan	PTV
2003	Sahil Ki Tamana	Rashida	PTV
2004	Tanha Tanha	Mrs. Furqan	PTV
2006	Kiran Kahani	Kiran's mother	PTV
2006	Ghar Damad	Basheera	Hum TV
2007	Man-o-Salwa	Sheraz's mother	Hum TV
2012	Mata-e-Jaan Hai Tu	Mama Jani	Hum TV
2012	Zard Mausam	Mehrunnisa's mother	Hum TV
2012	Badi Aapa	Amma	Hum TV
2013	Darmiyaan	Raheel's mother	ARY Digital
2013	Mujhe Khuda Pe Yaqeen Hai	Saman	Hum TV
2014	Digest Writer	Zareena	Hum TV
2014	Mehram	Romana	Hum TV
2015	Mohabbat Aag Si	Saba mother	Hum TV
2015	Saas Bahu	Shamara	Geo TV
2015	Piya Mann Bhaye	Aliya	Geo Entertainment
2015	Aik Thi Misaal	Bushra's mother	Hum TV
2015	Mera Dard Na Janay Koi	Aliya Begum	Hum TV
2016	Intezaar	Azmeer's mother	A-Plus
2016	Noor Jehan	Noor's mother	Geo TV
2016	Ghalti	Shaheen	A-Plus
2016	Noor-e-Zindagi	Saleem and Waseem's mother	Geo TV
2017	Shiza	Mehr	ARY Digital
2017	Bholi Bano	Kulsoom	Geo Entertainment
2017	Imam Zamin	Ayesha	TV One
2017	Pagli	Khalid's mother	Hum TV
2017	Khamoshi	Surrahya	Hum TV
2018	Belapur Ki Dayan	Raeesa	Hum TV
2018	Mere Khudaya	Samina	ARY Digital
2018	Tawaan	Tabinda	Hum TV
2018	Ab Dekh Khuda Kya Karta Hai	Firdous	Geo Entertainment
2018	Khudparast	Zarina	ARY Digital
2019	Khaas	Nusrat	Hum TV
2019	Bewafa	Kinza mother	ARY Digital
2019	Darr Khuda Say	Afreen's mother	Geo TV
2020	Makafaat Season 2	Jahan Ara	Geo TV
2020	Munafiq	Zareena	Geo Entertainment
2020	Mohabbat Tujhe Alvida	Shahaan's mother	Hum TV
2020	Jalan	Sajeela	ARY Digital
2020	Main Agar Chup Hoon	Bi Jan	Geo Entertainment
2020	Mohabbatain Chahatein	Sneha's mother	Hum TV
2021	Mujhe Khuda Pay Yaqeen Hai	Hammad's mother	Geo Entertainment
2021	Khwaab Nagar Ki Shehzadi	Asma	ARY Digital
2021	Makafaat Season 3	Zobia's mother	Geo Entertainment
2022	Aitebaar	Shagufta	Hum TV
2022	Badzaat	Mehwish Begum	Geo TV
2022	Mamlaat	Yasir's mother	Geo TV
2022	Sirat-e-Mustaqeem Season 2	Tahir's mother	ARY Digital
2022	Nisa	Asad's mother	Geo TV
2022	Bichoo	Safia	Hum TV
2022	Pehchaan	Nafeesa Begum	Hum TV
2023	Makafaat Season 5	Zubaida Begum	Geo Entertainment
2023	Samjhota	Husna	ARY Digital
2023	Tere Aany Se	Ifrah's grandmother	Geo Entertainment
2023	Mayi Re	Saiqa's mother	ARY Digital
2024	Ghaata	Khala Bi	Geo Entertainment
2024	Kaffara	Zaira	Geo Entertainment
2024	Ghair	Shafeeqa	ARY Digital
2025	Bekhaway	Mahtab	Geo Entertainment

=== Telefilm ===
Year	Title	Role
1987	Chalte Chalte	Samreen
2008	Kala Pull	Begum Sahiba
2013	You and Me Forever	Paras's mother
