= Champa Aur Chambeli =

- Also known as: Sultana Kunji Wali
- Genre: Family drama Social drama
- Written by: Mustafa Hashmi
- Directed by: Faisal Omer Turk
- Starring: Imran Aslam (actor); Fazila Qazi; Fatima Effendi; Kiran Tabeir; Mariya Khan; Hina Rizvi; Parveen Akbar
- Country of origin: Pakistan
- Original language: Urdu
- No. of episodes: 50

Production
- Producers: Asad Butt and (Turk Films)
- Production location: Pakistan
- Running time: Approx 35 Minutes

Original release
- Network: Geo Kahani
- Release: 21 April – 26 August 2017

Champa Aur Chambeli (also known as Sultana Kunji Wali on Geo Entertainment) is a 2017 Pakistani drama serial directed by Faisal Omer Turk, produced by Turk Films and written by Mustafa Hashmi.The drama was first aired on 21 April on Geo Kahani. The story revolves around the life of two young women, Champa and Chambeli, and their mother, Sultana.

== Cast ==
- Fazila Qazi as Sultana
- Fatima Effendi as Champa
- Kiran Tabeir as Chambeli
- Imran Aslam
- Parveen Akbar
- Rashid Farooqui
- Hina Rizvi
- Mariya Khan
