= Maryam (TV series) =

2015 Pakistani drama television series

- Urdu: مریم
- Genre: Romantic drama; Serial drama
- Written by: Kishore Asmal
- Directed by: Syed Ali Raza Usama
- Starring: Mawra Hocane; Faysal Quraishi; Alyy Khan; Uzma Gillani; Kamran Jilani
- Country of origin: Pakistan
- Original language: Urdu
- No. of seasons: 1
- No. of episodes: 31

Production
- Producers: Geo A & B
- Production location: Pakistan
- Camera setup: Multi-camera setup
- Production company: A & B

Original release
- Network: Geo TV
- Release: 31 March – 3 November 2015

Maryam is a Pakistani drama television series directed by Syed Ali Raza Usama, written by Kishore Asmal. It originally aired on Geo Entertainment from 31 March 2015, starring Mawra Hocane, Faysal Quraishi, Alyy Khan, Uzma Gillani, and Kamran Jilani.

== Plot ==
Maryam, a bold and outgoing young woman, falls for Amaan, a successful businessman. Her cousin, Behraam, is obsessed with her and tries to win her over, but she rejects him. Meanwhile, Amaan's stepmother is manipulative, wanting to secure her son Sheraz's inheritance as he has no child.

Maryam and Amaan's paths cross when she visits his office for a photography assignment, and they develop feelings for each other. Their fathers, friends since old times, notice the chemistry between them and arrange a meeting, leading to their marriage.

After marriage, Maryam learns the true intentions of Amaan's mother. His father passes away due to the cardiac arrest, and Maryam is accused of stealing, prompting them to relocate and start a new.

On Maryam's birthday, Amaan comes home late, and she's pregnant. Behraam kidnaps her for a night. On learning her pregrancy, Amaan demands a DNA test, misled by his mother, believing Maryam's unfaithful. His mother tricks them into divorce; Maryam suffers a miscarriage and coma. Amaan falls into depression, divorcing her, thinking it's best.

Maryam marries Behraam. Sheraz shoots him and Amaan takes the blame of his murder. The family leaves Amaan's mother. Sheraz realizes his mistake when her wife gets pregnant. Amaan returns home, meeting Maryam at a shrine for a new beginning.

== Cast ==
- Mawra Hocane as Maryam
- Faysal Quraishi as Amaan
- Alyy Khan as Behraam
- Uzma Gillani as Firdous Begum
- Kamran Jilani as Sheraz
- Hammad Farooqui as Salman

== Production ==
The series was earlier titled Ja Tujhe Maaf Kiya.
