= Inspector Jamshed: The Secret Parchment =

Upcoming Pakistani action film

- Poster
- Directed by: Fahd Nur
- Screenplay by: Eric Berg
- Story by: Ishtiaq Ahmed; Atif Siddique
- Based on: Inspector Jamshed series by Ishtiaq Ahmed
- Produced by: Muhammad Adnan Butt; Asif Raza Mir; Rabia Asif
- Starring: Omair Rana; Ahad Raza Mir; Faran Tahir; Asif Raza Mir; Anoushay Abbasi; Jad Hadid
- Cinematography: Mark Hobson
- Edited by: Sandeep Francis
- Music by: Amar Mohile
- Production companies: Dot Republic Media; CreatorsOne Studios; Walnut Media
- Release date: January 2027
- Country: Pakistan
- Languages: English; Urdu

Inspector Jamshed: The Secret Parchment, also known as IJ: The Secret Parchment, is an upcoming Pakistani action-adventure thriller film directed by Fahd Nur and produced by Muhammad Adnan Butt, Asif Raza Mir and Rabia Asif under the production banners of Dot Republic Media, CreatorsOne Studios and Walnut Media. Based on the Inspector Jamshed detective novel series created by Pakistani writer Ishtiaq Ahmed, the film stars Omair Rana as the titular character, alongside Ahad Raza Mir, Faran Tahir, Asif Raza Mir and Anoushay Abbasi. The screenplay was written by Eric Berg, with additional writing by Atif Siddique.

The film follows Inspector Jamshed and his three children as they become involved in an international conspiracy involving a mysterious ancient relic, secret societies and a series of disappearances. Its first official trailer was released on 28 August 2026. The film is scheduled for a worldwide theatrical release in 2027, followed by an over-the-top (OTT) release.

== Plot ==
Ancient artefacts begin disappearing around the world, along with the experts investigating them. When a mysterious and potentially powerful relic comes into the possession of Inspector Jamshed's three children, Mehmood, Farooq and Farzana, the family becomes involved in an international conspiracy. As spies, assassins and members of a secret society pursue the artefact, Inspector Jamshed attempts to uncover the truth behind its significance and prevent it from falling into the wrong hands. The investigation develops into a larger mystery involving a series of murders, family relationships and threats connected to the secret parchment.

== Cast ==
- Omair Rana as Inspector Jamshed
- Ahad Raza Mir as Behzaad
- Faran Tahir as Zafar Iqbal Burki
- Asif Raza Mir as Khan Rehman
- Anoushay Abbasi as Shakeela Begum (Mrs. Jamshed)
- Ravel Imran as Mehmood
- Ahmed Harkous as Farooq
- Aline Harkous as Farzana
- Jad Hadid as Inspector Ikram
- Daria Zhabska as Dye
- Mohamed Abdel Rahman Ibrahim Mohamed (Rik Aby) as Professor Daud
- Casey Shannon as Skeeter (Shahid)
- Pahal Samyani as Shaista
- Orli Shuka as Ahmed
- Eri Shuka as Aide
- Kevin Hutchinson as Fin
- Wisaam Farhat as Eel
- Farzana Palathingal as Miss Ansa
- Keith Dallison as the Post Master

== Production ==
=== Development ===
In September 2020, it was reported that a web series based on Ishtiaq Ahmed's Inspector Jamshed novels was in development. The series was directed by Fahad Noor and produced by Adnan Butt. The project was described as an effort to produce locally relevant content that would promote moral and ethical values among younger audiences. The film is based on the Inspector Jamshed series of Urdu detective novels written by Pakistani author Ishtiaq Ahmed. The character of Inspector Jamshed was introduced in the novel Packet ka Raaz in 1972. Ahmed subsequently wrote 796 novels in the series over a period of 43 years, according to the film's. The adaptation was developed to introduce the literary character to an international film audience.

According to executive producer Muhammad Adnan Butt, the screenplay draws inspiration from three novels by Ahmed: Packet ka Raaz, Paanch Qadam Par Maut and Farzi Chor. The filmmakers sought to retain the central characters and themes of the original stories while adapting their setting and narrative for contemporary audiences.

=== Filming ===
Principal photography took place in the United Arab Emirates, primarily in Abu Dhabi and Dubai. According to Khaleej Times, filming lasted 104 days and covered more than 30 locations. These included Louvre Abu Dhabi, Masdar City, Reem Island, Aldar Headquarters building, Al Khatim Desert and Sheikh Zayed Bridge. The production involved personnel from 13 nationalities and approximately 1,300 crew members and participants. The film's action sequences were developed with the involvement of stunt director George Kirby and action director Amr McGyver. The Andy Long Stunt Team also contributed to the production's martial arts and stunt work.

== Release ==
The first official trailer for the film was released on 28 August 2026 through the film's official digital platforms. The film is scheduled for a worldwide theatrical release in 2027, followed by an OTT release. Its initial international release plans include the United Arab Emirates and other Gulf Cooperation Council markets.

== See also ==
- Inspector Jamshed series
