= Main Agar Chup Hoon =

Pakistani romantic soap televisions series

- Title card
- میں اگر چپ ہوں
- Genre: Soap opera Romance
- Written by: Erum Wasi; Saima Wasi
- Directed by: Ali Akbar
- Starring: Fatima Effendi; Adeel Chaudhry; Hammad Farooqui; Sehar Khan
- Country of origin: Pakistan
- No. of episodes: 92

Production
- Producers: Abdullah Kadwani; Asad Qureshi
- Running time: 37 - 39 minutes
- Production company: 7th Sky Entertainment

Original release
- Network: Geo Entertainment
- Release: November 23, 2020 – February 21, 2021

Main Agar Chup Hoon (Urdu: میں اگر چپ ہوں, lit. 'If I am quiet') is a 2020 Pakistani romantic soap television series, produced by Abdullah Kadwani and Asad Qureshi under 7th Sky Entertainment. It stars Fatima Effendi and Adeel Chaudhry in lead roles in their second project together, the first being Munafiq, along with Hammad Farooqui and Sehar Khan in parallel lead roles. The supporting cast include Sajida Syed, Farhan Ally Agha, Ayesha Gul, Sami Khan, Yasir Shoro, and Sumaiyya Bukhsh. It is written by Saima Wasi and Erum Wasi. It was first broadcast on 23 November 2020 and was shown daily at 19:00 (PST) on Geo Entertainment until 21 February 2021.

== Synopsis ==
Zeeshan feels indebted to his ex-wife, Emaan, for having looked after his family and household expenses at a time when they had cut ties with him for marrying someone else abroad. Now that he is back in his home town, memories reignite his love for Emaan. Emaan finds it hard to choose between her ex-husband and her new fiancé Ahad until he risks his life in an effort to impress her.

Zeeshan's return makes Emaan uncomfortable. Her younger sister, Sehrish, is causing her concern, and her relationship with Ahad is also in trouble.

== Cast ==
- Fatima Effendi as Emaan
- Adeel Chaudhry as Ahad
- Hammad Farooqui as Zeeshan
- Sehar Khan as Sehrish (Dead)
- Farhan Ally Agha as Alam
- Yasir Shoroo as Atif
- Sumaiyya Bukhsh as Shifa
- Sajida Syed as Bi Jan
- Ayesha Gul as Shameem; Emaan's mother (Dead)
- Nida Mumtaz as Zeeshan's mother
- Khalifa Sajeeruddin as Mubashir; Zeeshan's father
- Sami Khan (child actor) as Zain
- Kanwal Khan
- Yasir Alam
- Hassan Shah

== Soundtrack ==
The original soundtrack is sung by Shafqat Amanat Ali and Bina Khan, and written by Mubashir Hassan. The OST is composed by Naveed Nashad, son of a noted Pakistani music composer Wajid Nashad.
