= Hammad Farooqui =

Pakistani actor

- Born: 7 September 1989 (age 36); Karachi, Pakistan
- Education: University of Karachi
- Occupations: Actor; Model
- Years active: 2009–present
- Spouse: Sanodia Hammad (m. 2017)
- Children: 1
- Relatives: Faraz Farooqui (twin-brother)

Hammad Farooqui is a Pakistani actor and model. He is known for his roles in the dramas Darr Khuda Say, Gumrah, Ustani Jee, Main Agar Chup Hoon, Yeh Raha Dil and Kahin Deep Jaley. He is the recipient of Hum Award for Best Soap Actor for his performance in Haya Ke Daaman Main.

== Early life ==
Hammad took part in reality dance competition called Nachle that was judged by Faysal Quraishi, Reshma and Noor. Later he was contacted by a TV channel and he agreed to work in dramas.

== Career ==
Hammad made his debut as an actor in 2009. He appeared in dramas Meri Maa, Ishqaaway, Maryam, Ustani Jee and Haya Ke Daaman Main. Then he appeared in dramas Sangdil, Kitni Girhain Baaki Hain Season 2, Gumrah, Sangsar and Yeh Raha Dil. Since then he has appeared in the dramas Piya Naam Ka Diya, Darr Khuda Say, Kahin Deep Jaley, Mein Jeena Chahti Hoon, Rabba Mainu Maaf Kareen and Main Agar Chup Hoon.

== Personal life ==
Hammad married Sanodia in 2017 and they welcomed a baby boy in 2022. Hammad's brother Faraz is also an actor.

== Filmography ==
=== Television ===
Year	Title	Role	Network
2010	Adhoore Dastaan	Aslam	Hum TV
2012	Saaray Mausam Apne Hain	Aizan	Geo TV
2012	Piya Ka Ghar Pyara Lagay	Amad	ARY Digital
2012	Chandni	Asfar Ahmed	Express Entertainment
2013	Meri Maa	Danial	Geo Entertainment
2013	Kohar	Wazeer	Urdu 1
2014	Mohabbat Behta Darya	Danial	TV One
2014	Meka Aur Susral	Asfar	ARY Zindagi
2015	Ishqaaway	Nail	Geo Entertainment
2015	Bewaqoofian	Ramesh	ARY Digital
2015	Maryam	Salman	Geo Entertainment
2015	Aitebaar	Ahmer	Aaj Entertainment
2016	Haya Ke Daaman Main	Babar	Hum TV
2016	Sangdil	Shahzaib	Geo Entertainment
2016	Kitni Girhain Baaki Hain (season 2)	Ayaz	Hum TV
2016	Bandhan	Ammar	ARY Digital
2017	Gumrah	Aliyan	Hum TV
2017	Yeh Raha Dil	Hassan	Hum TV
2017	Sangsar	Ashar	Hum TV
2017	Parchayee	Saad	Hum TV
2018	Kabhi Band Kabhi Baja	Zaid Ahmed	Express Entertainment
2018	Ustani Jee	Ahsan	Hum TV
2019	Makafaat Season 1	Ali	Geo Entertainment
2019	Wafa Lazim To Nahi	Ashir	A-Plus
2019	Piya Naam Ka Diya	Babar	Geo Entertainment
2019	Kahin Deep Jaley	Hatim	Geo Entertainment
2019	Darr Khuda Say	Raza Haroon	Geo Entertainment
2020	Mein Jeena Chahti Hoon	Taimur	Express Entertainment
2020	Dikhawa	Faisal	Geo Entertainment
2020	Rabba Mainu Maaf Kareen	Fateh	Hum TV
2020	Main Agar Chup Hoon	Zeeshan	Geo Entertainment
2021	Yaar Na Bichray	Fasih	Hum TV
2021	Dikhawa Season 2	Irfan	Geo Entertainment
2021	Shehnai Kaun Bajaye Ga	Adeel	SAB TV
2021	Makafaat Season 3	Mutahir	Geo Entertainment
2021	ARY Celebrity League	Himself	ARY Digital
2022	Beqadar	Yasir	Hum TV
2022	Makafaat Season 4	Sobhan	Geo Entertainment
2022	Sirat-e-Mustaqeem Season 2	Ali	ARY Digital
2022	Oye Motti Season 2	Kashan	Express Entertainment
2023	Dikhawa Season 4	Ajmal	Geo Entertainment
2023	Ahsaas	Faris	Express Entertainment
2023	Nikah	Naveed Raza	Geo Entertainment
2023	Tere Aany Se	Wasiq	Geo Entertainment
2023	Pyar Kay Naghmay	Anwar	TV One
2023	Mein Kahani Hun	Kashif	Express Entertainment
2023	Daurr	Zamaan	Green Entertainment
2024	Rishtey	Asim	Aan TV
2024	Mumkin	Aashir	Aur Life
2024	Dikhawa Season 5	Arman	Geo Entertainment
2024	Makafaat Season 6	Sheraz	Geo Entertainment
2024	Chaal	Farukh	Geo Entertainment
2024	Haq Mehar	Adil	Geo Entertainment
2025	Mann Marzi	Hadi	Geo TV
2025	Makafaat Season 7	Aamir	Geo Entertainment
2025	Na Tum Jano Na Hum	Ebad	Green Entertainment
2025	Khatputli	Shehryar	Geo TV
2025	Bahar Nagar	Adeel	Geo Entertainment
2025	Aik Bhool	Kashaan	Green Entertainment

=== Telefilm ===
Year	Title	Role	Ref(s)
2011	Maamu	Salman	
2019	Eid Loadshedding Mubarak	Mani	
2019	Dilnaz Naseeb Wali	Shafqat	
2019	Sheikh Sahab Chal Basay	Asaf	
2024	Tumhari Aleezay	Sherry	

=== Film ===
Year	Title	Role
2018	Socha Tha Pyaar Na Karenge	Imran Ahmed
2019	Mohra	Ali
2019	Muhabbat Kya Cheez Hai	Arman

== Awards and nominations ==
Year	Award	Category	Result	Tile	Ref.
2017	5th Hum Awards	Hum Award for Best Soap Actor	Won	Haya Ke Daaman Main	
