= Nazish Jahangir =

Pakistani actress

- نازش جہانگیر
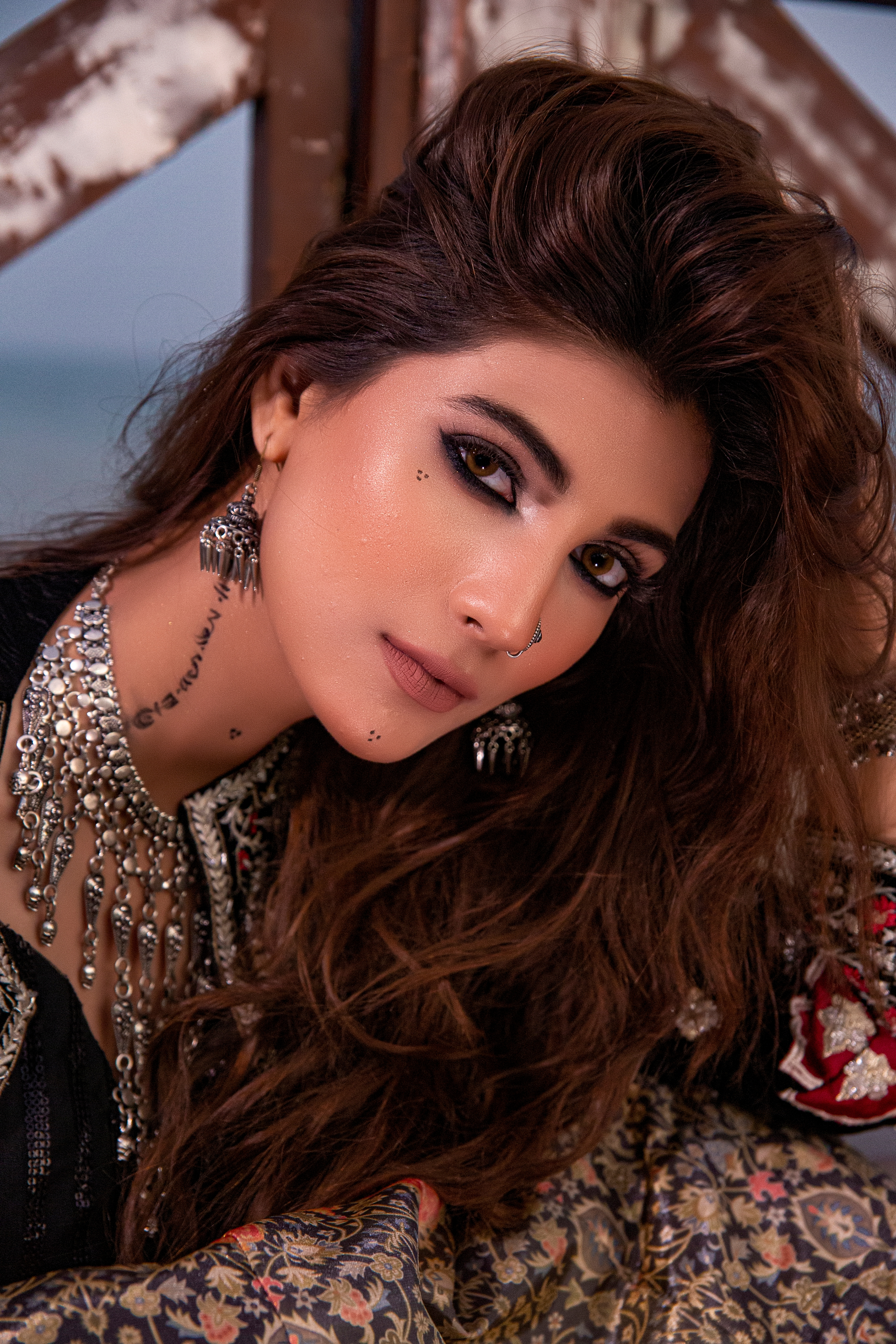
- Nazish Jahangir in 2022
- Born: Nazish Jahangir; 28 April 1994 (age 32); Islamabad, Pakistan
- Occupation: Actress
- Years active: 2017 – present

Nazish Jahangir (Urdu: نازش جہانگیر) is a Pakistani television actress. She is known for her role as Zoya in Thays, Faiza in Tohmat, Nimra in Kam Zarf and Shameela in Kahin Deep Jaley. Other than acting, she is known for her work as a mental health awareness activist.

== Early life and education ==
Born and raised in Islamabad, she initially graduated in fine arts and fashion designing. After her professor and renowned artist Jamal Shah encouraged her to pursue a career in performing arts, Jahangir moved to Karachi and started doing commercial theatre with Anwar Maqsood in 2015.

== Career ==
She made her TV debut in 2017 with Bharosa. Jahangir has also appeared in Kahin Deep Jaley, Alif, Allah Aur Insaan, Tohmat, Thays, Kam Zardari, Beparwah, Dard Rukta Nahi, Ghamandi, Inaam-e-Mohabbat, Berukhi, Teri Behisi, Saraab and Meray Mohsin.

In 2020, the actress revealed that she had been battling PTSD (post-traumatic stress disorder) for the last 10 years, and continues to struggle with mental health issues.

In 2022, Jahangir made her film debut with Lafengay, opposite Sami Khan. In 2024, she appeared in the romantic comedy film Poppay Ki Wedding along with Khushhal Khan.

In 2025, fellow actor Aswad Haroon accused Jahangir of fraud, alleging that she took a large sum of money and a vehicle from him in exchange for work. Haroon alleged that Jahangir reneged on her promise, didn't return the money or car, and had the actor assaulted for seeking damages. An arrest warrant was issued for Jahangir in March 2025.

Jahangir has been nominated as a best emerging talent in TV, at Lux Style Awards and has appeared on the covers of multiple Pakistani magazines.

== Filmography ==
=== Television ===
Key
| † | Denotes work that has not been released yet |

| Year | Title | Role | Network | Notes | Ref(s) |
|---|---|---|---|---|---|
| 2017 | Bharosa | Samia | ARY Digital | | |
| 2018 | Alif Allah Aur Insaan | Roshni | Hum TV | | |
| 2018 | Tohmat | Faiza | Geo Entertainment | | |
| 2018 | Gali Mein Chand Nikla | Shaista | TV One | | |
| 2018 | Thays | Zoya | A-Plus Entertainment | | |
| 2019 | Khatakaar | Mehwish | Play Entertainment | | |
| 2019 | Haqeeqat | Safaa | A-Plus Entertainment | Episode "Malal" | |
| 2019 | Kam Zarf | Nimra; Azar's love interest | Geo Entertainment | | |
| 2019 | Makafaat | Chutnisha | Geo Entertainment | Episode "Nidamat" | |
| 2019 | Meray Mohsin | Sidra | Geo Entertainment | | |
| 2019 | Beparwah | Chuchi Parvez | Express TV | | |
| 2019 | Kahin Deep Jaley | Shameela | Geo Entertainment | Main Antagonist | |
| 2019 | Dard Rukta Nahi | Maria | Express TV | | |
| 2020 | Makafaat season 2 | Rubab | Geo Entertainment | Episode "Doulat Ka Ghamand" | |
| 2020 | Saraab | Namal | Hum TV | | |
| 2020 | Dil Tanha Tanha | Mirha | Hum TV | | |
| 2021 | Berukhi | Maira | ARY Digital | | |
| 2023 | Jinzada | Abiha | Geo Entertainment | | |
| 2024 | Ishqaway | Zoya | Geo Entertainment | | |
| 2025 | Mafaad Parast | Zara | Geo Entertainment | | |

=== Films ===
| Year | Title | Role | Notes | Ref. |
|---|---|---|---|---|
| 2022 | Lafangey | Ghost | Opposite Sami Khan | |
| 2024 | Poppay Ki Wedding | Ayesha | Released | |

=== Other appearances ===
| Year | Title | Role | Notes | Ref. |
|---|---|---|---|---|
| 2018 | Mazaaq Raat | As Guest | Hosted by Abrar-ul-Haq | |
| 2024 | Bin Bulaye Mehmaan | Kiran | Telefilm on Aur Life | |

== Awards and nominations ==
| Year | Work | Award | Category | Result | Ref. |
|---|---|---|---|---|---|
| 2021 | Kahin Deep Jaley | Lux Style Awards | Best Emerging Talent | Nominated | |
