= Yaran Di Toli =

Studio album by Rizwan Ali Jaffri
- Released: 2013
- Recorded: 2012–13
- Genre: Pop rock, Bhangra
- Length: 38:06
- Language: Punjabi and English
- Label: Fire Records

Yaran Di Toli is the debut studio album of model and actor Rizwan Ali Jaffri. It was released in 2013 by Fire Records and produced by MAFFH Productions. The album won the Lux Style Award for Best Music Album of the Year at 13th Lux Style Awards.

== Track listing ==
The lyrics to the songs on the album were written by Mansoor Qaiser, Khadim Hussain Khadam, Raheel Fayyaz, Ali Shakeel, Rizwan Ali and the composition of the album was done by Raheel Fayaz, Khadam Hussain, Khadam, Suhail Abbas.

1. "Tuteya Wada" - 3:30 m
2. "Suna Mukhra" - 4:01 m
3. "Zulfaan Ne Kaliyaan" - 3:47 m
4. "Kirchi kirchi" - 5:08 m
5. "Medely - Tribute to Noor Jehan" - 4:16 m
6. "Rung Rung" - 3:24 m
7. "Makhna Di Makhni" - 3:50 m
8. "Gulabo" - 3:34 m
9. "Yaran Di Toli" - 4:24 m
10. "Yaar Mahi" - 3:29

== See also ==
- 13th Lux Style Awards
