= Tohmat =

- Title screen
- Genre: Family drama
- Written by: Irfan Ahmed Shams
- Directed by: Shafqat Moinuddin
- Starring: Taifoor Khan; Nausheen Ahmed; Yasir Ali
- Country of origin: Pakistan
- Original language: Urdu
- No. of seasons: 01
- No. of episodes: 38

Production
- Producers: Syed Mukhtar Ahmed; Tariq Shah
- Production location: Karachi
- Running time: 35-40 minutes

Original release
- Network: Geo Entertainment
- Release: 9 March – 19 August 2018

Related
- Adhoora Bandhan; Kis Din Mera Viyah Howay Ga (Season 04)

Tohmat (English: Accusation) is a 2018 Pakistani drama serial directed by Shafqat Moinuddin. It aired on Geo TV on Friday and Saturday nights at 7:00 p.m., beginning on 9 March 2018. The serial was written by Irfan Ahmed for Gold Bridge Media and stars Nausheen Shah, Taifoor Khan, Yasir Ali, and Momina Khan in lead roles.

== Cast ==
- Nosheen Ibrahim as Aila
- Yasir Ali Khan as Aashir
- Momina Khan as Naila
- Tariq Jameel as Rafiuddin
- Kainat Chohan as Sara
- Manoj Kumar as Jahanzaib
- Sohail Perzada as Ramish
- Ghazala Butt as Rukhsana
- Abid Ali as Saqib Baig
- Taifoor Khan as Kamran Baig
- Beena Chaudhary as Sumera
- Sara Abdhullha as Sonia
- Adil Abbass as Adil
- Shazia Gohar as Parveen
- Usman Patail as Sohail
- Nazish Jahangir as Faiza

== Soundtrack ==
Tohmat OST

Soundtrack album by Sahir Ali Bagga & Maria Mir
- Released: 26 September 2018
- Recorded: 2018
- Genre: Television soundtrack
- Length: (3:55)
- Language: Urdu
- Label: Geo Entertainment

Music video
- "Tohmat" OST on YouTube

The title song was sung by Sahir Ali Bagga & Maria Mir. Sahir Ali Bagga also composed the music.
