= Meray Mohsin =

Pakistani television series

- Title screen
- Written by: Nadia Akhter
- Directed by: Ali Faizan
- Starring: Rabab Hashim; Syed Jibran; Erum Akhtar; Jinaan Hussain; Nazish Jahangir; Saba Hameed
- Country of origin: Pakistan
- Original language: Urdu
- No. of episodes: 28

Production
- Producers: Abdullah Kadwani; Asad Qureshi
- Production locations: Karachi, Sindh, Pakistan
- Camera setup: Multi-camera setup
- Running time: approx. 40 minutes
- Production company: 7th Sky Entertainment

Original release
- Network: Geo Entertainment
- Release: 19 June – 11 December 2019

Mere Mohsin (Urdu: میرے محسن, lit. 'My Benefactor') is a 2019 Pakistani television series produced by Abdullah Kadwani and Asad Qureshi under 7th Sky Entertainment. It features Rabab Hashim and Syed Jibran in leads while Nazish Jahangir as antagonist.

== Cast ==
- Rabab Hashim as Soha
- Syed Jibran as Mohsin
- Mariyam Nafees as Nazia
- Nazish Jahangir as Sidra
- Jinaan Hussain as Batool
- Saba Hameed as Khursheed Begum (Jahan Ara, Batool, Nazo and Mohsin's mother)
- Erum Akhtar as Jahan Ara
- Gul-e-Rana as Safia (Zahid and Sidra's mother)
- Tanveer Jamal as Raza (Soha's father)
- Fazila Qazi as Aalia
- Faiza Gillani as Mrs. Zahid (Zahid's third wife)
- Kamran Jilani as Zahid (Sidra's brother)
- Daniyal Afzal as Zain
- Shajeer-ud-Din as Phuppa (Zahid and Sidra's father)
- Saleem Mairaj as Khalid
