= Ishq Ibadat =

- Genre: Drama
- Written by: Muhammad Asif
- Directed by: Barkat Siddiqui
- Starring: Javed Sheikh; Faisal Qureshi; Moammar Rana; Natasha Ali; Fatima Effendi; Mahnoor Baloch
- Original language: Urdu
- No. of seasons: 1
- No. of episodes: 23

Production
- Running time: 20 minutes

Original release
- Network: Geo TV
- Release: 22 October 2011 – 10 March 2012

Ishq Ibadat (Urdu: عشق عبادت, lit. 'Love is Worship') is a 2012 Pakistani drama serial broadcast by Geo TV. The 23-episode serial is written by Muhammad Asif.

== Cast ==
- Javed Sheikh
- Faisal Qureshi
- Moammar Rana
- Mahnoor Baloch
- Natasha Ali
- Fatima Effendi
- Mariam Khan
