= Mein Jeena Chahti Hoon =

Pakistani television series

- Genre: Romance drama
- Written by: Aneeza Syed
- Directed by: Kamran Akber Khan
- Starring: Nimra Khan; Hammad Farooqui; Kamran Jilani; Hajra Khan; Adnan Shah Tipu
- Opening theme: "Mein Jeena Chahti Hoon" by Sahir Ali Bagga & Sara Raza Khan
- Composer: Sahir Ali Bagga
- Country of origin: Pakistan
- Original language: Urdu
- No. of episodes: 27

Production
- Producer: Satish Anand
- Camera setup: Multi-Camera setup
- Running time: Approx. 42-43 Minutes
- Production company: Eveready Pictures

Original release
- Network: PTV Home; Express Entertainment
- Release: 24 January 2020 – present

Mein Jeena Chahti Hoon (transl. I Want to Live) is a 2020 Pakistani family drama television series premiered on PTV Home & Express Entertainment on 24 January 2020. It is produced by Satish Anand under Eveready Pictures. It has Nimra Khan, Kamran Jilani and Hammad Farooqui in lead roles.

== Plot ==
The story revolves around Sara (Nimra Khan) who is the only child of Khan Sahab (Manzoor Qureshi). Sara's mother died when she was young. Khan Sahab does not have any connection with his relatives because after his mother's death, his brother had taken possession of the property and belongings of Khan Sahab and the latter had in retaliation broken all links with his brother and relatives. Time passes and Sara is now 20, a young university going girl. She has a friend Tabinda who is very close to her. Tabinda's brother Taimur likes Sara but has never shared his feelings to either Tabinda or Sara. Khan Sahab meets Usman at a golf course and finds him to be a well established man, working in a multinational firm. He invites Usman to his house. On the other hand, Sara's uncle (Khan Sahab)'s brother sends a proposal of his son Shafiq for Sara because of her property. Khan Sahab rejects the proposal. Later on, after the doctors inform Khan Sahab that he has a serious illness, he persuades Usman to marry Sara.

== Cast ==
- Nimra Khan as Sara
- Kamran Jilani as Usman
- Hammad Farooqui as Taimur
- Adnan Shah as Shafiq Khan
- Manzoor Qureshi as Khan Sahab
- Hajra Khan as Rabia
- Hashim Butt as Raheem; Taimur's father
- Beena Chaudhary as Shaista; Taimur's mother
- Sabahat Ali Bukhari as Rania
- Sohail Asghar as Nawaz Khan; Sara's uncle
- Ghazala Butt as Suriya
- Hanif Bachchan as Taimur's father
- Abeer Qureshi as Tabinda
- Malik Raza as Sultan
