= Lafangey =

2022 Pakistani horror-comedy film

- Directed by: Abdul Khaliq Khan
- Written by: Abdul Khaliq Khan
- Produced by: Tariq Habib Rind
- Starring: Sami Khan; Saleem Meiraj; Mubeen Gabol; Mani; Nazish Jahangir
- Release date: 10 July 2022
- Country: Pakistan
- Language: Urdu

Lafangey is a 2022 Pakistani Urdu-language horror-comedy drama film directed by Abdul Khaliq Khan who also wrote the screenplay. It starrs Sami Khan, Saleem Meiraj, Mani, Mubeen Gabol and Nazish Jahangir. According to media reports, the film is an unofficial remake of 2017 Indian Telugu-language film Anando Brahma. It was released on 10 July 2022 on the occasion of Eid-ul-Azha and received poor reviews from critics. The film was initially rejected by the Central Board of Film Censors for its use of "very vulgar language".

== Cast ==
- Sami Khan
- Saleem Meiraj
- Mubeen Gabol
- Mani
- Nazish Jahangir
- Behroze Sabzwari
- Rasheed Naz
- Sohail Asghar
- Gul-e-Rana

== Release ==
It released on 10 July 2022 on the occasion of Eid-ul-Azha.

=== Controversy ===
The film was rejected by the censor board due to some vulgar dialogues as stated by the sources. However, it was allowed to release.

== Reception ==
Mohammad Kamran Jawaid of Dawn praised the performances of a number of the actors but criticised the lack of originality of the film as it heavily copied Anando Brahma.
