= Ishtiaq Ahmad (fiction writer) =

Pakistani novelist (1944–2015)

- اشتیاق احمد
- Born: 1941; Panipat, Haryana, British India
- Died: 17 November 2015 (aged 73–74); Jinnah International Airport, Karachi
- Resting place: Jhang
- Occupation: Novelist
- Writing career
- Language: Urdu
- Genre: Mystery
- Notable work: Inspector Jamshed series

Ishtiaq Ahmad (اﺸﺘﻴﺎﻖ اﺤﻤﺩ in Urdu), (1944 – 17 November 2015) was a Pakistani fiction writer famous for his spy and detective novels in the Urdu language, particularly the Inspector Jamshaid series. He was born in Karnal, now in India. Then his family migrated to Jhang in Pakistan.

He started his career by writing short stories for children and then wrote his first novel in 1973. He is the author of the highest number of novels (his 773rd novel was published by Atlantis Publications in April 2011) by any author in any language throughout the world.

== Novels ==
- Lamhe Ki Mout (To be Printed)
- Seemoon Ki Wapsi
- Imran Ki Wapsi
- File Ka Inteqm
- Akahri Jiral
- Aik Arab Dollars Ka Mansuba
- Begal mission
- Chuhay Daan
- gulamy ka smandar
- Waadi e Marjaan
- Dusri Khala
- File Number 119
- Batooma Kay Shaitaan
- Sonay Ka Ghoda
- Jazeeray Ka Samundar
- Daldal Ka Samundar
- اڑن طشتری کا تجربہ
- Packet ka raaz (In two editions)
- Un kai karnamay
- Gaar ka sammundar
- Chupa rustam
- Aasteen ka sanp
- Yashoma or surkh teer
- Surkh teer ka shikar
- Surkh teer ka kaidi
- Surkh teer ke waadi mai
- Jungle mai cheek
- Daku ka khauf
- Purasarar wardatai
- Maut ka khail
- Bhai jan ki talash
- Dhokay kay Pahar
- Yoda par hamla
- Mout ke Soudagar
- Jin + Sheitan
- Khatarnak 10
- Sarlaas
- Fartan'la
- Tasweer ka Qatal
- Purisrar Aaqa
- Mukhlis Qatil
- Barf k us paar
- Abzaal
- Fridge Ki Talaash
- Ungli ki Qeemat
- Purasarar Mehman
- Apni Laash
- Blackmailer
- Asharfy Ka Raaz
- Farooq Ki Rooh
- Dosra Mujrim
- Pistol Ka Aghwa
- Bawarchi Khane Main Laash
- Saumandar ka Tohfa
- Khouf ke Shikaar

== Career ==
He started his career by writing short stories for children and then wrote his first novel in 1973. He was at his peak of popularity in the 1970s to 1990s when paper printed novels were most read. He was famous due to his Inspector Jamshed novels, Inspector Kamran Mirza novels, and Shoki Brothers novels, and sometimes a combination of all three. As of 2014, he was an editor of the magazine (novel for children) and writing novels for Atlantis Publications, Karachi. Ishtiaq Ahmed was among the first to write Urdu fiction for children in Pakistan.

His most famous novels include Sunehri Chatan, Jazeeray Ka Samandar, Dairay Ka Samanadar, Jeraal Series, Duniya ke us Paar, and Sone ka Jahaaz.

Ishtiaq Ahmad has authored hundreds of suspense thriller novels in Urdu for children which include characters such as Inspector Jamshed, Inspector Kamran Mirza as well as the Shoki brothers. He had written nearly 800 spy and detective novels during his writing career.

== Death ==
He died on 17 November 2015 at Jinnah International Airport on his way back to Lahore. He was waiting to board a plane after attending the 11th Karachi International Book Fair held at the Karachi Expo Center. His cause of death was a serious heart attack. Among his survivors were his wife, five sons and three daughters. He was buried at the Adhiwala graveyard in his hometown of Jhang.

== Tribute ==
Detective novelist Shahzad Bashir, who was inspired by Ishtiaq Ahmed and considered him as his spiritual teacher, wrote a novel Shuaaon Ka Hungama on November 17, 2021 as a tribute to Ishtiaq Ahmed.

== See also ==
- Ashfaq Ahmed
- Shahzad Bashir
- Inspector Jamshed: The Secret Parchment
