= Kiran Haq =

Pakistani television actress

- کرن حق
- Born: Lahore, Punjab, Pakistan
- Occupations: Actress, model
- Years active: 2006 - Present

Kiran Haq (Punjabi: کِرن حَق) is a Pakistani television actress. Haq had a supporting role in the 2011 series Akbari Asghari. She has appeared as lead in several television serials including Shehr-e-Ajnabi, Maan, Tum Mere Kya Ho, Sangdil, Khaali Haath and Naulakha.

== Career ==
Haq started out as a fashion model. In 2010, she became a television actress, appearing in a number of dramas and serials. She debuted in Tere Pehlu Mein as Kiran. In 2014, Haq was cast in the lead role of Ufaq in the drama series Shehr-e-Ajnabi, which first aired in Pakistan on the A-Plus Entertainment channel.

== Filmography ==
=== Film ===
Year	Serial	Role	Ref(s)
2020	Money Back Guarantee	ganddu	

=== Television ===
Year	Serial	Role	Ref(s)
2006	Sharbati	Kiran	
2010	Tere Pehlu Mein	Kiran	
2011	Akbari Asghari	Shabbo	
2011	Ahmed Habib Ki Betiyan		
2012	Bano Bazar		
2012	Main Marr Gaye Shaukat Ali	Hajra	
2013	Durr-e-Shehwar	Fazeelat; Mansoor's siser	
2012	Mi-Raqsam		
2012	Sirat e Mustaqim		
2012	Saheliyan	Parishay	
2013	Lagay Na Jiya	Jasmine (Jazz)	
2013	Hisar E Ishq	Rania	
2013	Miss Fire	Momi	
2013	Aye Dasht E Junoon	Laaj	
2014	Shehr-e-Ajnabi	Ufaq	
2014	Love, Life Aur Lahore	Kousar	
2014	Tum Meray Hi Rehna	Sumbal	
2015	Sangat	Farah	
2015–2016	Maan	Wafa	
2015–2016	Tum Mere Kya Ho	Maheen	
2016	Sangdil	Sofia	
2016	Zindagi Aur Kitne Zakham	Aiman	
2016	Naimat	Zara	
2016	Kon Karta Hai Wafa		
2017	Pinjra	Zulaikha	
2017	Khaali Haath	Sobia	
2017	Dar Si Jaati Hai Sila	Nadia	
2018–2019	Naulakha	Shafaq	
2018	Parlour Wali Larki	Amna	
2019–2020	Ramz-e-Ishq	Rania	
2019–2020	Darr Khuda Say	Tamkeen	
2020	Haqeeqat	Kashf	Episode 11
2020	Tu Zindagi Hai	Maya	
2020	Khoob Seerat	Dil Kash	
2020	Raaz-e-Ulfat	Ismail's wife	
2020	Dil Tanha Tanha	Tooba	
2020	Ek Jhoothi Love Story	Shabana	Web-series
2021	Fitoor	Mehmal	
2023	Meray Hi Rehna	Ruhi	
2024	Dao	Sumbul	
2024	Hasrat	Sanaya	
