= Kiran (serial) =

Pakistani television series

- Also known as: Mubarak Ho Rishta Aaya Hai
- Genre: Family drama
- Written by: Nasreen Nizami
- Directed by: Tehseen Khan
- Starring: Marjan Fatima; Hiba Aziz; Munawar Saeed
- Country of origin: Pakistan
- Original language: Urdu
- No. of episodes: 62 on Geo Kahani; 73 on Geo Entertainment

Production
- Producer: Babar Javed
- Production location: Pakistan
- Running time: Approx 40 Minutes on Geo Kahani Approx 28 minutes on Geo Entertainment

Original release
- Network: Geo Kahani
- Release: 21 April – 23 September 2017

Kiran is a 2017 Pakistani drama directed by Tehseen Khan, produced by Babar Javed, and written by Nasreen Nizami. The drama stars Marjan Fatima, Hiba Aziz, and Munawar Saeed in lead roles and first aired on 21 April 2017 on Geo Kahani. The serial also aired on Geo Entertainment under the title Mubarak ho Rishta Aaya hai.

== Synopsis ==
A beautiful young girl, Kiran always dreamt of an ideal marital life in the form of a warm-hearted husband and a caring breadwinner for the family. The greatest irony of dreams occurs when life makes Kiran a figure who takes responsibility on her shoulders. Kiran is in the midst of her wedding preparations when her father suffers a heart attack. She decides to postpone her marriage and sell the gold for his treatment, which makes her future in-laws upset. To her dismay, the father has a heart infection, which requires him to stay back at the hospital. Kiran gives up her aspirations and enters the workforce. Her fear of the unknown leads to a transformation in her personality. How will she cope with future challenges in her new role as a sole breadwinner for her family?

== Cast ==
- Marjan Fatima as Kiran
- Hiba Aziz as Guriya
- Munawar Saeed as Afzal
- Parveen Akbar as Kiran's Mami
- Basit Faryad as Fawad
- Sabahat Adil as Kiran's mother
- Ikram Abbasi as Ahmer
- Nargis Rasheed as Salma
- Furry Ali as Fatwa
- Rana Major as Zaid
- Tabrez Shah as Faraan
- Farah Nadir as Surayyia
- Mohammad Ali Khan as Hassan
- Farhad Ali as Addan
