= Subh-e-Pakistan =

Pakistani television show

- Title screen
- Also known as: English: Morning Pakistan
- Genre: Morning show
- Directed by: Muhammad Irfan Junejo; Humayun Ali
- Presented by: Aamir Liaquat Hussain
- Composers: Sherry Raza; Sohail Qiyas
- Country of origin: Pakistan
- Original language: Urdu
- No. of seasons: 1

Production
- Executive producer: Syed Iman Ali
- Producers: Mustajeeb Abbas Rizvi; Mehwish Zahra Naqvi; Shehraan Choudry; Tahira Abdul Karim
- Production location: Karachi
- Running time: 140 – 160 minutes

Original release
- Network: Geo Entertainment (2014–15); Geo Kahani (2015–16)
- Release: 19 November 2014 – 8 July 2016

Related
- Utho Jago Pakistan

Subh-e-Pakistan was a Pakistani live morning show hosted by a research scholar Aamir Liaquat Hussain. It was first aired 19 November 2014 on Geo Entertainment. by morning show Utho Jago Pakistan, hosted by Shaista Wahidi which was banned due to act of blasphemy during the show. After being defunct for a few months, the show was re-launched on 7 December 2015, under the title Subh-e-Pakistan Kahani Ke Sath on channel Geo Kahani. On May 23, 2020, Aamir Liaquat Hussain announced that Subh-e-Pakistan would be coming back to Express Tv after Ramadan.

== Segments ==
The show is based on following segments that run throughout the programme:

- Allah Ke Babarkat Naam Se – Starting of the transmission by reciting verses of the Quran.
- Ab Thora Sa Muskurao – In this segment, comedian Kashif Khan interacted with the audience to spread smiles on their face.
- Diwar-e-Khabria – ‘In this segment, the host along with comedian Kashif Khan analyzed the hidden humor in everyday Jang Newspaper. Along with the news, they also analyzed videos from around the globe.
- Sitaron Ka Chal Chalan – In this segment an astrologer forecast the horoscope of all zodiacs for the day.
- Ao Kuch Kaam Ki Baat Karen – This segment focused on social issues. In the presence of a doctor, scholar, celebrity and an affected person, issues like dowry, marriage bureaus, social evils were discussed. On specifically Friday, issues were discussed in the light of what Islam says on certain matters.
- Masail Ka Hal Wazaif Se – In this segment, live calls were taken and Maulana Bashir Farooqi suggested spiritual remedies for the desired problem in the light of Quran and Sunnah.
- Robaro – This segment was a session between the host and a guest celebrity.
- Masnoon Dua
- Khutba
- Ronamai
- Aamir Se Dil Ki Baat
- Aap Ki Baat

== Re-launch ==
In Ramadan 2015, Aamir Liaquat left the show to host Ramazan Sharif, a religious show for the whole month. After that he did not rejoin Subh-e-Pakistan. This morning show was replaced by Nadia Khan Show on Geo Entertainment in November. On 7 December 2015, Subh-e-Pakistan was re-launched under the title Subh-e-Pakistan Kahani Ke Sath on Geo Kahani.
