= Mujhe Khuda Pay Yaqeen Hai =

Pakistani television series

- Genre: Romance; Drama
- Written by: Soofia Khurram
- Directed by: Saleem Ghanchi
- Starring: Aagha Ali; Nimra Khan; Yashma Gill
- Country of origin: Pakistan
- Original language: Urdu
- No. of seasons: 1
- No. of episodes: 105

Production
- Producers: Abdullah Kadwani; Asad Qureshi (Producer)
- Running time: 30-38 minutes
- Production company: 7th Sky Entertainment

Original release
- Network: Geo Entertainment
- Release: 1 February – 8 May 2021

Mujhe Khuda Pay Yaqeen Hai (Urdu: مجھے خدا پہ یقین ہے, lit. 'I Have Faith In God') is a 2021 Pakistani spiritual romantic drama television series. Produced by Abdullah Kadwani and Asad Qureshi under 7th Sky Entertainment, it features Aagha Ali, Nimra Khan, and Yashma Gill in lead roles. The drama serial is written by Soofia Khurram and Saleem Ghanchi. The season premiered on 1 February 2021. It is digitally available on YouTube and in some countries on VIU App from 5 August 2021.

== Plot ==
Mujhe Khuda Pay Yaqeen Hai revolves around the age-old fight between good and evil. When Shakra and Nazneen are banished from their old neighborhood for indulging in witchcraft, the mother-daughter duo are forced to look for a new rental apartment. Nazneen feels that she is worthy of a handsome man who could give her shelter and treat her like a princess. But she has to get rid of her first husband whose existence she absolutely despises.

However, she soon realizes that her wait is over as she sets her eyes upon her new landlord, Hammad, the day they are introduced. Shakra and Nazneen quietly move into the new apartment where they receive a warm welcome from Hammad's wife Rida. This is where Nazneen begins to envy her. Unaware of their secretive and dark past, the married couple put their trust in Shakra and Nazneen and treat them like family.

Subsequent episodes feature surprising revelations as Shakra, who falsely claims to be an expert in religious knowledge, helps her daughter in distancing Hammad from his wife and children through black magic. Nazneen doesn't rely solely on her mother's spellcasting to separate the loving couple as she also takes advantage of her closeness with Rida and resorts to manipulation and deceit every now and then.

Mujhe Khuda Pay Yaqeen Hai offers subtle hints at how it is like to be the one suffering; how it is like for children to end up with a broken family, and to experience depression and abandonment issues. As the series goes on, it never dawns on the victims yet that they are under the influence of black magic. But with Rida as a protagonist, she is seen as a strong woman who bears every obstacle that comes her way— even when her husband and children look away from her.

== Cast ==
- Agha Ali as Hammad, Rida's husband, Nazneen's former husband, Rameen & Saim's father, Salma's son.
- Nimra Khan as Rida, Hammad's wife, Rameen & Saim's mother, Salma's Daughter-in-law.
- Yashma Gill as Nazneen, Hammad's second wife.
- Sajida Syed as Salma Begum, Hammad's mother
- Gul E Rana as Shakira (Nazneen's fake mother)
- Seemi Pasha as Zainab (Nazneen's Biological/Real mother)
- Saleem Mairaj as Nazneen's former husband
- Rashid Farooqui
- Shaharyar Ghazali
- Asim Mehmood as Furkan, Hammad's business partner & Friend.
- Rushna Khanzada as Mehwish, Rida's best friend, Furkan's love interest.
- Mubasira Khanam
