= Be Rehem =

Pakistani television series

- Genre: Family drama Soap opera Social Serial
- Written by: Samina Ejaz
- Directed by: Abid Raheem
- Starring: Omer Shahzad; Sumaiyya Bukhsh
- Country of origin: Pakistan
- Original language: Urdu
- No. of episodes: 110

Production
- Producer: Babar Javed
- Production location: Pakistan
- Running time: approx 20 Minutes

Original release
- Network: Geo Entertainment
- Release: 17 July – 19 December 2018

Related
- Umm-e-Haniya

BayReham (Urdu: بے رحم, lit. 'Merciless') is a 2018 Pakistani soap drama serial directed by Abid Rahim, produced by Babar Javed and written by Samina Ejaz. The drama stars Omer Shahzad and Sumaiyya Bukhsh in lead roles. From 17 July 2018 it started airing from Monday to Friday on Geo Entertainment followed by Umm-e-Haniya. The story is about a psycho husband who tortures his wife.

== Cast ==
- Sumaiyya Bukhsh as Ashi
- Omer Shahzad as Rehan
- Jahanara Hai as Ashi's grandmother
- Raja Feroz as Faisal
- Ikram Abbasi as Jamshed
- Benita David as Faiza
- Sami ur Rehman as Faraz
- Farzana Thaeem as Safia
- Waqas Khan as Farhan
- Seema Khan as Atiya
- Kiran Qureshi as Aaliya
- Shazia Gohar as Durdana
