= Saraab =

2020 Pakistani television series

- Original title: سراب
- Genre: Drama; Psychological fiction
- Starring: Sami Khan; Sonya Hussain; Nazish Jahangir; Ghana Ali
- Music by: SK Salman Khan
- Opening theme: Naveed Nashad
- Country of origin: Pakistan
- Original language: Urdu
- No. of episodes: 78

Production
- Producer: Moomal Shunaid
- Production locations: Abbottabad; Nathia Gali; Defence Housing Authority, Karachi , Karachi; P.E.C.H.S Block 2 , Karachi
- Cinematography: Saleem Abbas
- Production company: Moomal Entertainment

Original release
- Network: Hum TV; PTV Home
- Release: 20 August 2020 – 11 March 2021

Saraab (transl. Illusion) is a Pakistani psychological drama television series broadcast on Hum TV from 20 August 2020 to 11 March 2021. It is written by Edison Idrees, directed by Mohsin Talat, and produced by Moomal Shunaid under the banner Moomal Entertainment. It stars Sami Khan as Asfandyar and Sonya Hussain as Hoorain, the former's eventual wife, suffering from schizophrenia.

== Plot ==
Hoorain is different from the people around her and keeps a distance from them. She likes her cousin Asfandyar and wants to marry him. She is ignored by her parents (as her sisters Namal and Warda are clever and sharp-minded) and lives in a separate room on the upper story of the house. These factors contribute to Hoorain becoming a victim of schizophrenia. Things become complicated when she starts to act like a schizophrenic. She has hallucinations and considers everyone her enemy. Asfandyar discovers about her disease and helps her, but things become complicated and interwoven. Asfand and Hoorain get married, and soon Hoorain discovers she is pregnant, which further complicates her schizophrenia. The doctor warns Asfand that pregnancy could lead to Hoorain having more psychotic attacks. Hoorain is admitted for therapy until she visibility starts getting better. Warda, Hoorain's sister, tries to instigate her against Asfandyar. Meanwhile, Hoorain suffers a complicated delivery after another of her hallucinations, and her mother prays that her baby will be a boy, as every girl would not have a husband as kind and understanding as Asfandyar if the baby inherited her disease. Hoorain gives birth to a healthy boy, who is named Sheheryar. The story is about Asfandyar's struggle to help Hoorain recover from this disease. Hoorain is readmitted to the hospital after her hallucinations about Sheheryar, and three months later, Asfandyar comes to take her back home as she has recovered, but she fakes losing her memory. However, the name Sheheryar slips out of her mouth, which leads to Asfand discovering she was faking losing her memory as she remembers Sheheryar clearly. Hoorain then reveals she faked this because she wanted to protect her child from her crazy hallucinations and thought she was incapable of raising Sheheryar. Asfand then consoles her, and they both embrace, going back home.

Ten years later, Asfand, Hoorain, and Sheheryar are shown to be living peacefully, and Hoorain has not overcome her schizophrenia completely, but she is learning to control it because of Asfand's patience and treatment.

== Cast ==
- Sonya Hussain as Hoorain “Hoor”
- Sami Khan as Asfandya "Asfand."
- Nazish Jahangir as Namal, Hoorain's sister
- Ghana Ali as Warda, Hoorain's elder sister
- Aurangzeb Leghari as Hoorain's father
- Fareeda Shabbir as Hoorain's Mother
- Sajid Shah as Asfandyar's father
- Kinza Malik as Asfandyar's mother
- Ejaz Khan as Nadir, Warda's husband
- Humaira Zahid as Warda's mother-in-law
- Jahanzeb Khan as Sufiyan; Warda's brother-in-law
- Pareezay Fatima as Huma, Asfandyar's sister
- Hani Taha as Zari, Warda's doctor
- Shafqat Khan as Asfandyar's friend

== Soundtrack ==
"Akhiyan hain udaas kyun"

Song by Naveed Nashad
- Language: Urdu
- Released: 16 August 2020
- Length: 4:19
- Label: HUM
- Songwriter: Qamar Nashad
- Producer: Moomal Entertainment

Music video
- "Saraab" OST on YouTube

The original soundtrack of the show was released on 16 August 2020. The music was composed and sung by Naveed Nashad, while the lyrics were written by Qamar Nashad.

== Production ==
In early 2020, it was announced that Sami Khan and Sonya Hussain, who previously starred together in Ishq Zahe Naseeb, are working together on a project, and later it was also revealed that the latter will play a schizophrenic in the series. By the April 2020, the 70% shot has been completed, which was earlier postponed by the COVID-19 pandemic. The first and second teasers of the show were released on 4 August 2020.

== Reception ==
=== Critical reception ===
The series garnered critical praise due to its subject of schizophrenia and Hussyn's performance, with Something Haute hailed her as, "the highlight of the play that addressed schizophrenia, doing complete justice to her role." It received negative reviews due to the portrayal of the toxic sister rivalry.

== Awards and nominations ==
Year	Awards	Category	Recipient(s)/ nominee(s)	Result	Ref.
2021	Pakistan International Screen Awards	Best TV Actor - Jury	Sami Khan	Nominated	
2021	Pakistan International Screen Awards	Best TV Actress - Jury	Sonya Hussyn	Won	
