= Khoob Seerat =

Pakistani television series

- Also known as: Khoobsurat
- خوب سیرت
- Written by: Shakeel Arsalan
- Starring: Kiran Haq; Agha Ali; Nimra Khan
- Country of origin: Pakistan
- Original language: Urdu
- No. of episodes: 78

Production
- Producers: Abdullah Kadwani; Asad Qureshi
- Production locations: Karachi, Sindh
- Camera setup: Multi-camera setup
- Running time: 35-40 minutes
- Production company: 7th Sky Entertainment

Original release
- Network: Geo Entertainment
- Release: 17 February – 22 May 2020

Khoob Seerat (Urdu: خوب سیرت, lit. 'Good character') is a 2020 Pakistani television series that premiered on Geo Entertainment on 17 February 2020. It is produced by Abdullah Kadwani and Asad Qureshi under their banner 7th Sky Entertainment. It features Kiran Haq, Nimra Khan and Agha Ali in lead roles.

== Plot ==
Dilkash (Kiran Haq) and Mahira (Nimra Khan) are friends opposite in nature. Dilkash values their friendship and has always sacrificed her own needs for Mahira. Despite being secretly in love with Samar (Agha Ali), Dilkash does everything possible to help Mahira and Samar's union. Soon, misunderstandings between both result in their marriages deteriorating, Mahira and Samar ending their relations. Owing to situations Samar and Dilkash marry. Though Dilkash feels sorry for Mahira, Mahira starts to despise Dilkash's married life.

After some time Mahira divorces her husband and again starts a relationship with Samar. Samar and Mahira get married. Although Dilkash is sad, she gives them permission and tries to take care of them. Samar's mother doesn't like Mahira and supports Dilkash. But Dilkash gives full support to Mahira and Samar although Mahira always taunts and insults Dilkash. Mahira and Samar enjoy their married life and Samar ends up neglecting Dilkash although he feels guilty. After some time Mahira becomes pregnant. Samar's mother's heart softens for the unborn child and she starts to take care of Mahira. Dilkash is taunted because Samar's second wife became pregnant before her. At this time Samar's friend Haroon comes to Pakistan and Samar and Haroon try to start a business. Mahira looks for ways to separate Samar from his family and Dilkash. Mahira lays a trap and makes every one believe that Dilkash tried to poison her to kill the baby out of jealousy although Dilkash is actually innocent. Samar thus takes Mahira to another house and stays with her and leaves his parents and Dilkash under Haroon's responsibility. Samar's father becomes ill for which Samar comes to take care of his father.

Mahira and Samar's son Munsif is born. Samar tries to balance between his family and Mahira but Mahira doesn't like it. So she lays another trap and makes Samar believe that Dilkash is having an extra-marital affair with Haroon. Samar thus doubts Dilkash. Haroon and Dilkash try to make Samar realise the truth but fail to do so. However Samar gets into an accident and temporarily loses his ability to walk. Thus Dilkash takes care of Samar in his old house. In this period Samar realises the truth that Mahira had always been lying and that Dilkash was the real good person. Samar finally regains his ability to walk. He threatens to leave Mahira but Mahira acts to be good and Samar starts to live with both Mahira and Dilkash. Dilkash becomes pregnant. However Mahira plays another game and tries to poison Dilkash. Mahira also makes Samar believe that Dilkash is in love with Haroon and wants a divorce from him and also that Dilkash wants to abort the baby. Samar decided to divorce Dilkash for Dilkash's own happiness.

Dilkash is frustrated at all these games and also at Samar's mistrust. She also gets to know that Mahira tried to poison her. Thus Dilkash leaves her house and starts to stay with her parents. Haroon finally makes Samar believe that nothing is going between Dilkash and him. Samar realises his fault and leaves Mahira. Samar goes to bring Dilkash back, but Dilkash refuses to come back and says she wants a divorce as she always wanted Samar's love but all she wants now is peace which Samar can't give him. Mahira starts to live with her ex-husband Wajahat and refuses to give Samar his son.

After much persuasion Dilkash finally decides to return to Samar. However, on the way they have an accident and Dilkash's sister-in-law and Dilkash's unborn child die. Since Dilkash was eight months pregnant and since she had a serious accident she could not bear children. Dilkash is heartbroken and again decides to not go to Samar as she wants to take care of her brother's child and also she wants peace. After trials, tribulations, and persuasion, Samar and Dilkash finally reunite. Mahira now wants a divorce from Samar. Dilkash tries to convince Mahira to come back to Samar with Munsif, but Mahira denies. Mahira tells Samar that he can have his child if he divorces Dilkash, however Samar is unable to divorce Dilkash. But Mahira now wants to marry Wajahat so she and Samar finally get divorced and she leaves Munsif at Samar and Dilkash's door. Mahira and Wajahat remarry, but at the wedding night Wajahat slaps Mahira and tells her that he had been doing the favours on Mahira so that he could get revenge on Mahira as she had left him earlier. He also hands Mahira divorce papers and ousts her from the house. A sad Mahira walks alone in the streets at night. A truck hits Mahira and she dies, on the other hand Samar and Dilkash are happy with Munsif.

Samar and Dilkash get together and have a happy ending as Dilkash had always wanted.

== Cast ==
- Aagha Ali as Samar
- Kiran Haq as Dilkash
- Nimra Khan as Mahira
- Beena Chaudhary as Najma (Samar's mother, Dilkash's mother-in-law)
- Nida Mumtaz as Rani (Dilkash's mother)
- Parveen Akbar as Saba (Mahira's mother)
- Rashid Farooqui as (Dilkash's father)
- Subhair Udeen
- Babar Khan as Inam (Dilkash's brother)
- Kamran Jilani as Wajahat (Mahira's former spouse)
- Rashida Tabassum as Noreen (Dilkash and Inam's maternal aunt)
- Aiza Awan as Bushra (Dilkash and Inam's maternal cousin)
- Maryam Noor as Nosheen (Dilkash's sister-in-law, Inam's wife)
- Ali Rizvi as Afzal (Dilksh and Inam's paternal cousin)
- Naeem Shaikh as Haroon (Samar's colleague and friend)
- Akram Abbasi
