= Fatima Effendi =

Former Pakistani actress and model

- Born: Fatima Effendi; 17 December 1982 (age 43); Karachi, Sindh, Pakistan
- Occupations: Actress, model
- Years active: 2001–present
- Spouse: Kanwar Arsalan (m. 2012)
- Relatives: Fouzia Mushtaq (mother); Maryam Effendi (sister)

Fatima Effendi (Urdu: فاطمہ افندی) is a Pakistani actress and model. She has appeared in the Pakistani drama series Man-O-Salwa, Meri Zaat Zarra-e-Benishan, Ishq Ibadat and Kash Mai Teri Beti Na Hoti.

== Career ==
Effendi was born in a Sindhi Muslim family. She is currently studying for a bachelor's degree in fashion design in Karachi.

== Personal life ==
Effendi is married to the actor and model Kanwar Arslan since 2012. The couple have two children Almir, Mahbir.

== Filmography ==
=== Television ===
Year	Title	Role	Ref(s)
2001	Chal Jhoothi		
2001	Daam-e-Rasai		
2007	Man-O-Salwa		
2009	Meri Unsuni Kahani		
2009	Maasi Aur Malika		
2009	Meri Zaat Zarra-e-Benishan	Aqsa	
2009	Sandal		
2009	Gumshuda		
2010	Larkiyan Mohallay Ki		
2010	Shehr-e-Dil Kay Darwazay		
2010	Jeevay Jeevay Pakistan		
2010	Baji		
2010	Aurat Ka Ghar Konsa		
2010	Kuch Kami Si Hai		
2011	Kash Mai Teri Beti Na Hoti	Khushi/Pagli	
2011	Pul-e-Sirat		
2012	Ishq Ibadat		
2013	Jia Na Jaye	Saba	
2014	Darbadar Tere Liye	Emaan	
2015	Hamari Betiyaan		
2015	Love Mein Twist		
2015	Takkabur	Mehru	
2016	Joru Ka Ghulam	Suhaina	
2016	Manjdhar		
2017	Mera Aangan	Mairah	
2017	Zindaan	Lubna	
2017	Champa Aur Chambeli	Champa	
2017	Paimaanay	Seerat	
2018	Aye Dil Tu Bata	Aqsa	
2020	Munafiq	Ujala	
2020	Main Agar Chup Hoon	Emaan	
2021	Khudgharziyan	Annie	
2021	Bechari Qudsia	Qudsia	
2022	Guddu	Nayaab	
2022	Betiyaan	Fizzah	
2022	Muqaddar Ka Sitara	Hadia	
2023-2024	Adawat	Areeba	
2023-2024	Tera Waada	Sarah	
2025	Mann Marzi	Mansha	

=== Other appearances ===
Year	Title	Role	Ref(s)
2011	Extras: The Mango People		
2015	Madventures		

=== Telefilms ===
- Dulha Bhai (Hum TV) (2008)
- Tum Se Kaise Kahoon (Hum TV) (2009)
- Raju Chacha Ban Gaey Gentleman (Hum TV) (2010)
- Chal Jhooti (Hum TV) (2010)
- Achay Ki Larki (Hum TV) (2010)
- Pappu Ki Paroson (Hum TV) (2011)
- Yeh Kon Sa Dayar Hai (Hum TV) (2011)
- Shaadi Ka Ladoo – Mera Teacher Mera Shauhar (Express Entertainment) (2011)
- Kattwi Chatt (ARY Digital) (2015)
