= Nimra Khan =

Pakistani actress

- Born: 26 June 1991 (age 35); Karachi, Pakistan
- Occupation: Actor
- Years active: 2010 – present
- Spouse(s): Raja Azam (m. 2020; div. 2021) Zain Hamid (m. 2026; div. 2026)

Nimra Khan (Urdu: نمرہ خان; born 26 June 1991) is a Pakistani actress. Khan made her acting debut with a brief role in comedy series Kis Din Mera Viyah Howay Ga (2013). She is known for her leading role in several television serials including Meherbaan (2017), Uraan (2019), Khoob Seerat (2020), Mein Jeena Chahti Hoon (2020), Mujhe Khuda Pay Yaqeen Hai (2021) and Umm-e-Ayesha (2024). In 2016, Khan made her film debut with Blind Love.

== Career ==
=== Television ===
Nimra started her career in a brief role in Kis Din Mera Viyah Howay Ga, she also played a lead role in television play Khwaab Tabeer on PTV. She is known for her performances in Kaisi Khushi Lekar Aaya Chand on A-Plus, opposite Ahsan Khan, Rishta Anjana Sa on Ary Digital and Choti Si Zindagi on Hum TV. In 2019, she had a good year as she was praised for her performances in the smash-hit drama Bhool on ARY Digital and popular hit series Uraan on A-Plus.

=== Film ===
Her debut film was Blind Love in which she played the lead role of the blind woman Sara. She appeared as Hayya in Saya e Khuda e Zuljalal, an action-war film about the Pakistan independence.

== Personal life ==
Nimra Khan was born on 26 June 1991.

On 21 August 2014 she was seriously injured in a road accident.

She married Raja Azam, a police officer, on 19 April 2020 in London; they divorced in 2021. She was married to Zain Hamid, a pilot, in June 2026, and divorced a month later.

== Filmography ==
=== Film ===
Year	Title	Role	Network
2016	Blind Love	Sara	
2016	Saya e Khuda e Zuljalal	Haya	

=== Television ===
Year	Title	Role	Network
2011	Kis Din Mera Viyah Howay Ga	Millie	Geo TV
2013	Chubhan	Zara	Hum TV
2013	Zard E Chaon		TV One
2014	Khwab Tabeer	Aliya	PTV
2014	Shareek-e-Hayat		Hum TV
2014	Pehli Jumeraat	Shaista	Express Entertainment
2015	Chhoti Si Ghalat Fehmi	Azra	Hum TV
2015	Mere Khuda	Saba	Hum TV
2016	Mere Humdum		Aaj Entertainment
2016	Jab We Wed	Rumi	Urdu 1
2016	Saya-e-Dewar Bhi Nahi	Seher/Rani	Hum TV
2016	Kaisi Khushi Le ke Aya Chand		A-Plus
2016	Rishta Anjana Sa		ARY Digital
2016	Choti Si Zindagi	Azra	Hum TV
2017	Baaghi	Munni	Urdu 1
2017	Alif Allah Aur Insaan	Zimmal	Hum TV
2017	Meherbaan	Dua	A-Plus TV
2019	Uraan	Husna	A-Plus TV
2019	Bhool	Sidra	ARY Digital
2019	Haqeeqat	Payal	A-Plus TV
2019	Dilnaz Naseeb Wali	Nageena	Hum TV
2020	Mein Jeena Chahti Hoon	Sidra	Express Entertainment
2020	Khoob Seerat	Mahira	Geo Entertainment
2020	Tasveer	Alina	Play Entertainment
2021	Mujhe Khuda Pay Yakeen Hai	Rida	Geo Entertainment
2021	Banno	Beena	Geo Entertainment
2021	Aye Musht-E-Khaak	Shiza	Geo Entertainment
2022	Zindagi Aik Paheli	Hira	Geo Entertainment
2023	Ehraam-e-Junoon	Sajeela	Geo Entertainment

=== Music video ===
Year	Title	Artist	Notes
2020	"Ye Watan Tumhara Hai"	Various	
