= Rizwan Ali Jaffri =

Pakistani model, actor and singer

- Born: 1986 (age 39–40); Lahore, Punjab, Pakistan
- Occupations: Actor, singer and model
- Years active: 2008–present

Rizwan Ali Jaffri is a Pakistani model, actor and singer. He is best known for his modeling work with renowned Pakistani fashion labels. He made his television debut in the 2012 drama serial Pani Jaisa Piyar, directed by Sarmad Sultan Khoosat. He marked his singing debut with his album Yaran Di Toli in 2013, which earned him the Best Album award at the 13th Lux Style Awards.

== Personal life ==
Rizwan Ali Jaffri was born in 1987 to Punjabi Muslim parents in Lahore, Punjab

== Career ==
Jaffri established himself as a model and then earned a status of super model, according to his accounts, his entry in the fashion industry was due to his friends, since he has long hair, and good looks.

== Filmography ==
=== Film ===
Year	Title	Role	Notes	Ref.
2017	Thora Jee Le	Kaizad		
2023	Daadal	Sarmad		

=== Television ===
Following is the list of selected television serials

Year	Title	Network
2011	Pani Jaisa Pyaar	Hum TV
202	Chalo Phir Se Jee Kar Daikhain	PTV
2012	Deewan-e-Muhabbat	Aan TV
	Humari Betiya	ARY Digital
2014	Ghar Ek Jannat	Geo Kahani
2014	Rukhsati	Geo TV
	Chal Dil Mere	Express TV
2015	Kuch Ishq Tha Kuch Majboori Thi	TV One
2015	Main Soteli	Urdu One
2016	Yeh Pyaar Hai	TV One
2020	Jalan	ARY Digital
2017	Mohabbat Zindagi Hai	Express TV
2019	Darr Khuda Say	Geo TV
2019	Bharosa Pyar Tera	Geo TV
2021	Yun Tu Hai Pyar Bohut	Hum TV
2022	Taqdeer	ARY Digital
2024	Khudsar	ARY Digital
2024	Mooray Piya	Green Entertainment
2025	Do kinaray	Green Entertainment
2026	Bas Tera Saath Ho	ARY Digital

== Discography ==
Rizwan Ali Jaffar marked his debut as a singer with following album, which was rewarded with the Lux Style Award for best music Album:

- Yaran Di Toli - 2013

== Awards ==
- 4th Pakistan Media Awards - Best Model Male - nominated
- 13th Lux Style Awards - Best Model of the Year (Male) nominated
