= Kam Zarf =

2019 Pakistani television series

- Title screen
- کَم ظَرْف
- Genre: Drama
- Written by: Seema Munaf
- Screenplay by: Seema Munaf
- Directed by: Zeeshan Ahmed
- Starring: Junaid Khan; Nadia Khan; Rabab Hashim
- Opening theme: Kamzarf by Shuja Haider
- Composer: Shuja Haider
- Country of origin: Pakistan
- Original language: Urdu
- No. of seasons: 1
- No. of episodes: 25

Production
- Producer: Hassan Zia
- Production locations: Karachi, Sindh
- Camera setup: Multi-camera setup
- Running time: 35 minutes
- Production company: Mastermind Productions

Original release
- Network: Geo Entertainment
- Release: 8 January – 11 June 2019

Related
- Ab Dekh Khuda Kya Karta Hai; Darr Khuda Say

Kamzarf (Urdu: کَم ظَرْف, lit. 'Ungenerous') is a 2019 Pakistani television series, produced by Hassan Zia under their production banner Mastermind Productions. It featured Junaid Khan, Rabab Hashim and Nadia Khan in lead roles. The drama aired on Geo Entertainment from 8 January to 11 June 2019.

== Plot ==
Story of Aima (Nadia Khan), the eldest sister of her siblings Azhar (Junaid Khan), Asim (Ali Ansari) and Mona (Sumaiyya Bukhsh). Their parents died when she was 16 years old and she was left alone to care for her siblings, as a mother. She wanted to marry her college friend but her father had wanted her to take care of her siblings. Time lapses and she is now an elderly woman with her young siblings. Mona is still finishing her last semester, Azhar the second elder brother finds a girl (Nazish Jehangir) for himself and wanted to marry her but because of Aima's disagreements he couldn't and forced to married to a tailor's daughter Fouzia (Rabab Hashim), whom he wasn't behaving really nice and quite harsh after marriage. Aima's uncle from America arrives, They have a young daughter Faria (Mariyam Nafees) who has a really liberal thought from which Asim is attracted to, so they decided to marry. Aima was also disagreeing to this marriage but Asim didn't listened, while Azhar formed a better relationship with his wife. While Aima meets her old love Nabeel (Alyy Khan), whom she wanted to marry, He is secretly married and has a child, he plans to marry Aima and take all her property, while Aima acting foolishly married him and gives him everything she had, while Faria, Asim's wife gets the house where the four siblings are living in form of a gift from her father, Aima opposes this decision and creates many misunderstandings in the house, while Mona founds a guy from University and they got married, Aima moves to Mona's house but couldn't live there more than two weeks she is left behind in a Woman's Asylum where the three siblings tried to find her but couldn't, because of Aima's unacceptable behavior and narrow-mindedness, she makes her life like hell and she was left alone at the end.

== Cast ==
Actor	Character	Notes
Junaid Khan	Azar	Fouzia's husband, Aima's younger brother, Mona and Asim's older brother
Nadia Khan	Aima	Nabeel's second wife (later divorced by him) and Azar, Mona and Asim's older sister
Rabab Hashim	Fouzia	Azar's wife, Safia's daughter
Mariyam Nafees	Faria	Aliyaan and Surya's daughter, Asim's wife
Sumaiyya Bukhsh	Mona	Azar, Asim and Aima's younger sister, Noman's wife
Ali Ansari	Asim	Faria's husband, Azar and Aima's younger brother, Mona's older brother, Aliyaan's nephew
Alyy Khan	Nabeel	Nazma's husband, Aima's husband (later divorced her)
Farah Nadeem	Surya	Aliyaan's wife, Faria's mother
Fahima Awan	Nazma	Nabeel's wife
Sabiha Hashmi	Shazia	Noman's mother
Tauqeer Ahmed	Noman	Mona's husband
Nazish Jahangir	Nimra	Azar's love interest
Rubina Arif	Safia	Fouzia's mother
Arisha Razi	Aima (young)	
Aadi Khan	Nabeel (young)	

== Production ==
The series was earlier titled Kasa-e-Zaat but the makers changed it to Kam Zarf.

== Soundtrack ==
Kam Zarf - OST

Soundtrack album by Shuja Haider
- Released: 12 January 2019
- Recorded: 2019
- Genre: Television soundtrack
- Length: (3:20)
- Language: Urdu
- Label: Geo TV

Music video
- Kam Zarf OST on YouTube

The title song "Na Baraf Na Pani" was sung by Shuja Haider. The music was composed by Shuja Haider and the lyrics were written by Omaya Arif, which has more than 5.2 million views on YouTube.
