= Inspector Jamshed series =

Series of crime novels by Pakistani author Ishtiaq Ahmad

Inspector Jamshed
- Author: Ishtiaq Ahmad
- Country: Pakistan
- Language: Urdu
- Genre: Detective fiction; Spy fiction; Mystery; Thriller
- Publisher: Maktaba-e-Aalia
- Published: 1972
- Media type: Print
- No. of books: More than 600 (reported)

Inspector Jamshed is a series of espionage and detective novels by Pakistani writer Ishtiaq Ahmad. The series follows Inspector Jamshed, who investigates criminal cases with the assistance of his three children, Mehmood, Farooq and Farzana. Other recurring characters include retired army officer Khan Rehman, Professor Dawood and Sub-Inspector Ikraam.

The series began in 1972 with the publication of Packet ka Raaz by Maktaba-e-Aalia. The novels cover crime, mystery and espionage, with storylines centred on criminal investigations and the involvement of Jamshed's family. The series has reportedly sold more than 40 million copies worldwide. The series comprises more than 600 novels, according to sources documenting Ahmad's published works.

== Plot ==
The series follows Detective Inspector Jamshed as he investigates various criminal cases, including murder, drug trafficking, organized crime, political corruption and international espionage. He is assisted by his three children, Mehmood, Farooq and Farzana, who take part in the investigations. Other characters include retired army officer Khan Rehman, Professor Dawood, who provides scientific assistance, and Sub-Inspector Ikraam, who assists in field operations and investigations. The stories focus on Jamshed's investigations, the involvement of his family and associates, and the challenges he encounters while solving cases.

== Film adaptation ==
A film adaptation of the Inspector Jamshed novels was announced in 2024 to be in development. The director has said that the film will be an original story inspired by the novels. In 2026, the film titled, Inspector Jamshed: The Secret Parchment premiered a teaser trailer on YouTube and is currently slated for release in 2027.
