= Darr Khuda Say =

2019 Pakistani television series

- Sana Javed and Imran Abbas
- Written by: Sarwat Nazeer
- Directed by: Anjum Shehzad
- Starring: Imran Abbas; Sana Javed; Kiran Haq; Qavi Khan; Mizna Waqas; Ali Ansari
- Opening theme: "Aankhon Mein Aansoo" by Sahir Ali Bagga
- Ending theme: "Dard Yeh Kyun Jholi Mein Aaye" by Sahir Ali Bagga
- Country of origin: Pakistan
- Original language: Urdu
- No. of episodes: 42

Production
- Producers: Abdullah Kadwani; Asad Qureshi
- Production locations: Karachi, Sindh
- Camera setup: Multi-camera setup
- Production company: 7th Sky Entertainment

Original release
- Network: Geo Entertainment
- Release: 18 June 2019 – 24 March 2020

Related
- Kam Zarf; Raaz-e-Ulfat

Darr Khuda Say (Urdu: ڈر خدا سے, lit. 'Fear God!') is a 2019 Pakistani television series produced by Abdullah Kadwani and Asad Qureshi under 7th Sky Entertainment. It stars Sana Javed and Imran Abbas in the lead roles. It is based on #MeToo and sexual harassment in the workplace. It is digitally available to stream on YouTube and in some countries on VIU App. In India, it is telecasting on Atrangii TV channel and streaming digitally on Atrangii App.

== Synopsis ==
Shahwais (Imran Abbas) is a handsome, rich, and arrogant businessman. He is married to an older and terminally ill person. Shahwais is a womanizer and dislikes his wife. He constantly tries to get rid of her since he only married her to take over her business.

His next womanizing target is Afreen (Sana Javed), an employee in his office. Afreen is a beautiful, innocent, and noble girl. She is the apple of her parents' eyes and is the most respectful of their four children. Shahwais tries to pursue her and constantly harasses her. However, after getting rejected by her many times, he asks another employee, Kashif, to photoshop fake pictures of Afreen and make them look as if she is having an affair with someone. Shahwais tries to blackmail her and threatens to expose the pictures to her parents if she refuses his advances. Afreen realizes this and stands up for herself by telling Shahwais that she is not like any of the other girls and slaps him. She tells him to fear Allah's punishment, but Shahwais takes the remark as a joke. What follows in the series is the aftermath as Shahwais tries to take revenge on her by using the fake pictures and showing them to her parents. Afreen's parents are ashamed and disappointed in her as they believed her to be their most honourable child. They start to believe what Shahwais says and turn against Afreen. She is heartbroken by the fact that her parents were unable to see her innocence and trusted a twisted man over her. Meanwhile, Afreen's older sister, Tamkeen, who is a divorcee, becomes attracted to Shahwais. She breaks off her previous engagement with a teacher with two children and marries Shahwais. However, Shahwais is still attracted to Afreen and uses her older sister as a means to get close to her. Despite the hardships in her life, Afreen does not lose faith in Allah and believes that one day her innocence will be proven and Shahwais will be brought to justice.

This drama depicts the harsh reality of workplace harassment and one girl's struggle and perseverance. It is also a reminder to people that Allah is always with those who put their trust in him, for he is the only one who opens the door for punishment, forgiveness, and justice.

== Cast ==
- Sana Javed as Afreen Siddiqui
- Imran Abbas as Shahvez Akhtar
- Qavi Khan as Mazhar Siddiqui
- Mizna Waqas as Maham (Afreen's sister-in-law, Tahir's wife)
- Kiran Haq as Tamkeen Siddiqui, afreen's sister.
- Saleem Mairaj as Rasheed
- Ali Ansari as Azhar Siddiqui, Afreens brother.
- Birjees Farooqui as Tahira (Raza's mother)
- Hammad Farooqui as Raza Haroon (Afreen's "ex" love interest)
- Namra Shahid as Shehla (Afreen's sister-in-law, Azhar's wife)
- Mariam Mirza as Gul (Shawais' older wife)
- Ali Rizvi as Kashif
- Gul-e-Rana as Afreen's Phuppo
- Sajida Syed as Afreen's mother
- Farah Nadir as Seema's mother
- Fahima Awan as Aasia (Afreen's friend)
- Rizwan Ali Jaffri as Mohsin (Afreen's ex-fiance)
- Shahzad Sheikh as Moien (Guest Appearance)

== Soundtrack ==
The original soundtrack of Darr Khuda Say is composed and sung by Sir Sahir Ali Bagga Jee. The song is available on Patari, and Apple Music.

== Awards and nominations ==
Date of ceremony	Award	Category	Recipient(s) and nominee(s)	Result	Ref
2021	4th IPPA Awards 2021	Best TV Serial	Darr Khuda Say	Nominated	
2021	4th IPPA Awards 2021	Best Director TV Serial	Anjum Shahzad	Nominated	
2021	4th IPPA Awards 2021	Best Actor Male TV Serial	Imran Abbas	Nominated	
2021	4th IPPA Awards 2021	Best Actor Female TV Serial	Sana Javed	Nominated	
2021	4th IPPA Awards 2021	Best Negative role TV Serial	Imran Abbas	Nominated	
2021	4th IPPA Awards 2021	Best Supporting Role Male/Female TV Serial	Kiran Haq	Nominated	
2021	4th IPPA Awards 2021	IPPA Best OST of the Year	Darr Khuda Say	Nominated	
