= Dil, Diya, Dehleez =

1999 novel by Riffat Siraj

- Author: Riffat Siraj
- Original title: دل, دیا, دہلیز
- Language: Urdu
- Genres: Fiction; Family Saga
- Publication date: 1999
- Publication place: Pakistan
- Media type: Print

Dil, Diya, Dehleez (Urdu: دل دیا دہلیز) is an Urdu-language novel written by Riffat Siraj and published in 1999 by Khazina-e-Ilam o Adab, Karachi. The novel was first published in Khawateen Digest, an Urdu monthly journal.

== Plot ==
The novel is about a woman named Zaitoon Bano and her life revolving around her of sorrow and pain. Based on her own revenge, she influences the lives of many without realizing how her actions can impact others. The story unfolds over two generations and reveals the secrets of many characters.

== Adaptation ==
In 2006, the novel was adapted by Hum TV into a television series of the same name directed by Yasir Nawaz. It stars Hiba Ali, Faisal Shah, Angeline Malik, Javeria Abbasi and Samina Peerzada.
