= Tum Mere Kya Ho =

2015 Pakistani romantic drama television series

- Genre: Drama, Romance
- Written by: Mehrunisa Mustaqeem Khan
- Directed by: Siraj-ul-Haque
- Starring: Mikaal Zulfiqar; Kiran Haq; Sajal Ali; Naima Khan; Umair Rana; Muhammad Mubarik Ali
- Theme music composer: Shani Arshad
- Opening theme: Tum Mere Kya Ho by Nabeel Shaukat Ali and Tehreem
- Country of origin: Pakistan
- Original language: Urdu
- No. of seasons: 1
- No. of episodes: 25

Production
- Executive producers: Abdullah Kadwani, Mikaal Zulfiqar and Asad Qureshi
- Producer: Abdullah Kadwani
- Production location: Lahore
- Cinematography: Sareeh Khan
- Camera setup: Multi-camera setup
- Running time: 32 minutes
- Production company: 7th Sky Entertainment

Original release
- Network: PTV Home
- Release: 14 October 2015 – 3 June 2016

Tum Mere Kya Ho (Urdu: تم میرے کیا ہو, lit. 'Who are you to me') is a 2015 Pakistani romantic drama television series directed by Siraj-ul-Haque and written by Mehrunisa Mustaqeem Khan. It was produced by Abdullah Kadwani and Asad Qureshi under the 7th Sky Entertainment banner, with Mikaal Zulfiqar serving as co-producer. The series stars Sajal Ali, Mikaal Zulfiqar, Kiran Haq and Umair Rana. It first aired on PTV Home on 14 October 2015 and concluded on 3 June 2016.

The series marked the fourth on-screen collaboration between Mikaal Zulfiqar and Kiran Haq.

== Plot ==
When Ahmer (Mikaal Zulfiqar) loses his wife Sadia (Mehreen Raheel) in a fatal road accident, he becomes the sole caretaker of his young daughter Hira (Eshal). Meanwhile, his employee Anwar, whose daughter Hina (Sajal Ali) is due to be married, is unable to meet the financial demands of her prospective in-laws and is forced to cancel the wedding. The shock of this causes Anwar to suffer a fatal heart attack. Ahmer takes on responsibility for supporting Hina.

Ahmer's former friend Maheen (Kiran Haq) has meanwhile left her husband and son and re-enters his life. Unable to accept his growing closeness to Hina, Maheen schemes to remove her from Ahmer's life. When Hina becomes involved with her classmate Mustaqeem, Maheen sees an opportunity to establish herself permanently in Ahmer's household. Ahmer finds himself torn between Maheen's advances and his sense of responsibility towards Hina.

== Cast ==
Actor	Character
Mikaal Zulfiqar	Ahmer
Sajal Ali	Hina
Kiran Haq	Maheen
Omair Rana	Khalid
Muhammad Mubarik Ali	Mustaqeem
Mehreen Raheel	Sadia
Raheela Agha	Nunhi
Sehrish Khan	Rehman Begum
Naima Khan	
Dania Anwar	
Eshal	Hira
Ali Muhammad	
Roohi Khan	
Saima Saeed Malik	
Humayun Gul	Mr Ahmed
Wahaj Khan	
Ali Kumar	
Khalid Butt	
Hooriya Ali	

== Soundtrack ==
The original soundtrack was composed by Shani Arshad and performed by Nabeel Shaukat Ali and Tehreem.

== Reception ==
A review in Dawn described Mikaal Zulfiqar's performance as visually compelling but noted the series relied on familiar plot conventions.
