= Kahin Deep Jaley =

2019 Pakistani television series

- کہیں دیپ جلے
- Genre: Romance; Family; Tragedy
- Created by: Qaisra Hayat
- Based on: Kahin Deep Jalay Kahin Dil
- Written by: Qaisra Hayat
- Story by: Qaisra Hayat
- Directed by: Saima Waseem
- Starring: Neelam Muneer; Imran Ashraf; Saba Faisal; Ali Abbas
- Narrated by: Neelam Muneer
- Theme music composer: Sahir Ali Bagga
- Opening theme: Teri Dunya Mere Rabba By Sahir Ali Bagga
- Ending theme: Teri Dunya Mere Rabba By Sahir Ali Bagga
- Composer: Sahir Ali Bagga
- Country of origin: Pakistan
- Original language: Urdu
- No. of seasons: 1
- No. of episodes: 34

Production
- Executive producer: Abdullah Kadwani
- Producers: Abdullah Kadwani; Asad Qureshi
- Editor: SK Khurram
- Camera setup: Multi-camera setup
- Running time: 40 minutes
- Production company: 7th Sky Entertainment

Original release
- Network: Geo Entertainment
- Release: 3 October 2019 – 14 May 2020

Kahin Deep Jaley (Urdu: کہیں دیپ جلے, lit. 'Somewhere a lamp is lit') is a 2019 Pakistani television series produced by Abdullah Kadwani and Asad Qureshi under their production banner 7th Sky Entertainment. It features Neelam Muneer and Imran Ashraf. From 3 October 2019, it aired every Thursday night on Geo Entertainment, ending on 14 May 2020.

== Plot ==
Rida is a young girl who is raised with three brothers: Faham is the eldest and raised his younger siblings after his father's death; Hatim, the second oldest, is also responsible, but he thinks more with his heart than his head and lives in America; and Asim is the youngest brother who loves to tease his sister. Shamila is Faham's wife who dislikes Rida and gets jealous of her as her brother does not love her as much as Rida's brothers do.

Zeeshan's dad dies in an accident and a greedy business partner snatches everything from him. His uncle then gives him a job working with Hatim and a house. Zeeshan is invited to Faham's wedding where he stops Rida's scarf from burning and falls in love with her. Tauqeer is a young man who has an unrequited love for Rida. One day, Tauqueer gives Rida a love letter, which the maid places inside a book in the study. Zeeshan's mother asks for Rida's hand in marriage, but Rida's brothers refuse because they want Rida to complete her education first. However, Rida's mother says yes, as she is worried that Shamila will make Rida's life hard and believes it is best if Rida gets married as soon as possible. She, however, does not express these concerns to her sons worried it will cause friction between Faham and Shamila.

Zeeshan becomes possessive around Rida, and on the second day of the wedding, Shamila asks Rida at the breakfast table whether she loves Zeeshan or her brothers more. Zeeshan expects her to take his name, but he is offended when Rida takes nobody's name. Zeeshan gets typhoid fever and learns that he can never become a father, which causes him to become more insecure because Rida's brothers are richer than him, something Shamila constantly mentions. Zeeshan tells Rida to return her dowry, which she unwillingly does, her brothers get hurt and Shamila sends a recording of their conversations to Zeeshan, who gets even more possessive about Rida. Shamila goes to Rida's house and sees Rida in a poor state and comments that Zeeshan needed a maid, not a wife. Zeeshan overhears this and confronts Shamila. Zeeshan and Rida go to Murree but return as Zeeshan's mother breaks her foot.

Rida remembers that Zeeshan has to collect his medical report and asks Zeeshan if he received it. Zeeshan panics and he scolds Rida for mentioning it. Faham sends a maid to Rida's home after Shamila comments that Rida is forced to do all the housework by herself. Zeeshan again scolds Rida and tells the maid that they do not need her. Rida finally gets angry and says that she is tired of his self-respect and vanity and that she feels suffocated around him and that she will leave him. He apologizes to Rida, though Zeeshan starts to get grumpy and ill-tempered with Rida again.

Rida goes to her mother's house after an anxious phone call with her mother. Zeeshan gets angry after finding out Rida has left his mother on her own and goes to her house to bring her back. While wandering around the study he finds Tauqeer's letter. Zeeshan falls into a state of complete shock and believes Rida has a secret lover. He drives home without Rida. Rida arrives home wondering why Zeeshan left without her. When she comes face to face with Zeeshan he starts shouting all sorts at her and throws her and the maid out of the house without explaining what has made him so angry. Rida and the maid return to the brothers' home while the maid explains what has happened.

On the way to Zeeshan's home, Faham is murdered by Rida's stalker, who escaped from jail. At Faham's funeral, Shamila blames Rida for Faham's death, saying Rida's lover killed Faham. Her brothers get angry at Shamila for accusing Rida. Zeeshan overhears the whole conversation and joins in. He shows the brothers Tauqueer's letter and breaks down crying over Rida's betrayal. Rida begs Zeeshan to believe she's innocent but Zeeshan announced their marriage is over. Rida screams and shouts at her brothers to stop Zeeshan but they both look at her in disgust before leaving. Before moving back to her maternal home Shamila continues to poison both brothers against Rida by constantly reminding them she's responsible for Faham's death.

Both brothers make it clear that they find Rida to be a burden, their brother's murderer, and that they are only tolerating her for their mother's sake. Tauqueer finds out his letter is the cause for Rida's marriage being wrecked and tries his hardest to fix it; his sister speaks to Zeeshan, explaining Rida's innocence but Zeeshan remains adamant to believe Rida was unfaithful. Rida learns she is pregnant and believes the baby will be a chance for her and Zeeshan to reunite.

However, an angry Zeeshan informs Rida he cannot become a father so the child is not his but hers and her lover's, proof that she was cheating on him. Rida gets very hurt by Zeeshan's words and vows never to forgive him. The stress causes Rida to faint and have a miscarriage. Meanwhile, Zeeshan is called back into the doctor's office and informed there had been a report mix up and that he is, in fact, able to become a father.

Zeeshan regrets his harshness towards Rida only to learn about her miscarriage. He begins to reflect on his behavior and realizes how unreasonable and possessive he was towards her. When he asks Rida's family to forgive him, Hatim shouts at him but finally agrees, but says he will only forgive Zeeshan if Rida forgives him. Rida, however, shuts the door on Zeeshan's face and says that he not only killed her child but her love and respect as well, her child is gone forever because of him. She further adds that even God will not forgive him until she does. Rida's words haunt Zeeshan as he slips into a deep depression. Shamila emotionally manipulates Hatim and falsely accuses her brother of abusing her.

Hatim forces his mother to allow his marriage to Shamila and sign over the house papers to her. Asim is wary of Shamila and does not believe in her innocence the way Hatim does. On their wedding night, Hatim makes it clear to Shamila that he only married her to save her from her brother and that for him she will always be Faham's wife. Zeeshan continues to slip further into depression and his uncle forces him to speak to a therapist. Shamila gets access to Rida's phone after apologizing for her earlier accusations and claims she wishes to start over their relationship.

From Rida's phone, Shamila texts Tauqueer and stages a plot in which Rida, Tauqueer, and Hatim end up in the same place. Hatim is disgusted and believes Rida is back to meeting up with her lovers. Asim walks into Rida's room and sees Shamila texting Zeeshan off Rida's phone. he begins to shout at Shamila as Rida walks into the room. Rida is shocked and realizes it was Shamila who has been messaging Tauqueer off her phone. Hatim divorces Shamila on the spot. She cries on Faham's grave, angry and regretful. A few men come and harass her, where she runs away and has an accident with a truck. Zeeshan meets some serial killers and asks them to whip him 80 times as said by the maulana. Rida goes with Asim to find Zeeshan where she gets a call from the serial killer who says that Zeeshan has come to him to die. Just as Zeeshan is getting whipped, Rida and Asim stop him. Rida unties Zeeshan and asks him why he is giving himself such a punishment, to which he answers that he wants Rida to forgive him. Rida forgives him for the sake of their child and says that she kept their child alive. Zeeshan then gets happy for a split second, as he was misinformed that Rida had a miscarriage. A few months later, Rida's brothers profit in their business. Rida delivers a baby boy whom she names Faham after her brother.

== Cast ==
- Neelam Muneer as Rida
- Imran Ashraf as Zeeshan Ahmed
- Ali Abbas as Faham, Rida's elder brother (Dead)
- Nazish Jahangir as Shameela, Rida's sister-in-law (Antagonist)
- Saba Faisal as Khadija, Rida's mother
- Saba Hameed as Zeeshan's mother
- Nida Mumtaz as Rehana, Shameela's mother (Dead)
- Hammad Farooqui as Hatim, Rida's brother
- Arez Ahmed as Asim, Rida's brother
- Ali Ansari as Touqeer, Rushna's brother
- Hashim Butt as Zeeshan's father (Dead)
- Beena Chaudhary as Touqeer's mother
- Farah Nadeem as Zeeshan's aunt
- Madiha Rizvi as Naila, Shameela's sister-in-law
- Hasan Noman as Salman, Shameela's brother
- Agha Mustafa Hassan as Farhan, Rida's Cousin
- Salma Shaheen as Zahida Bibi, Rida's family servant
- Sarah Ali as Rushna, Rida's best friend
- Shehzad Mukhtar as Habib, Zeeshan's uncle

== Soundtrack ==
Kahin Deep Jalay OST

Soundtrack album by Sahir Ali Bagga
- Released: 11 October 2019
- Recorded: 2019
- Genre: Television soundtrack
- Length: 5:51
- Language: Urdu
- Label: Geo Entertainment
- Producer: Abdullah Kadwani; Asad Qureshi

Music video
- Kahin Deep Jalay OST on YouTube

The OST is sung and composed by Sahir Ali Bagga and the lyrics are written by Sahir Ali Bagga and has 48 million+ views on Youtube.

== Reception ==
The show became very popular in a short period. Critics and audiences appreciated the acting of Nazish Jahangir (Shameela), Rida (Neelam Muneer), and Zeeshan (Imran Ashraf). The show crossed 20 TRPs and is one of the highest-rated Pakistani dramas as its climactic episode achieved a TRP of 23.

=== Awards and nominations ===
Date of ceremony	Award	Category	Recipients	Result	Ref.
October 9, 2021	Lux Style Awards	Best Male Actor - Viewer's choice	Imran Ashraf	Nominated	
October 9, 2021	Lux Style Awards	Best Emerging Talent	Nazish Jahangir	Nominated	
