= Gumrah (TV series) =

Television series

- Sabreen Hisbani
- Urdu: گمراہ
- Genre: Drama series; Romantic drama
- Written by: Malik Khuda Bakhsh
- Directed by: Saima Waseem
- Starring: Sabreen Hisbani: Komal Aziz Khan; Faisal Rehman; Hina Altaf; Hammad Farooqui
- Theme music composer: Sohail Haider
- Opening theme: "Mehrmaan Main Mehrmaan Tere Ishq Ne Gumrah Kiya" by Damia Farooq; lyrics by Sabir Zafar
- Country of origin: Pakistan
- Original language: Urdu
- No. of episodes: 35

Production
- Producer: Momina Duraid
- Production location: Karachi
- Cinematography: Nadeem Kashmiri
- Editor: Saad Bin Javed
- Camera setup: Multi-camera setup
- Running time: 35 ~ 40 mins
- Production company: MD Productions

Original release
- Network: Hum TV, Hum Network Limited
- Release: 5 September 2017 – 2 January 2018

Related
- Mohabbat Khawab Safar; De Ijaazat

Gumrah (Urdu: گمراہ; lit:to become astray) is a Pakistani romantic drama serial, that was first aired on 5 September 2017 on Hum TV. Sabreen Hisbani and Faisal Rehman play main leads while Hina Altaf plays the antagonist. Komal Aziz Khan and Hammad Farooqui also play key roles.

It is directed by Saima Waseem and written by Malik Khuda Bakhsh of Be Aitebaar.

== Synopsis ==
Huma and Faryal are best friends. Huma is always going to Faryal's house and wants the same lavish life Faryal does. Master Ijaz, Huma's father disapproves of this and believes that Faryal's parents and Faryal are making Huma greedy. Huma wants to have money and will do anything for it. She rejects Aliyan, Faryal's cousin because he is not as rich and will not meet her needs. Soon, Huma begins working at Faryal's father, Sarmad's company and ends up marrying him.

== Cast ==
=== Main cast ===
- Sabreen Hisbani as Anum
- Komal Aziz Khan as Faryal
- Hina Altaf as Huma
- Hammad Farooqui as Aliyan
- Faisal Rehman as Sarmad

=== Recurring cast ===
- Behroze Sabzwari as Master Ijaz
- Nida Mumtaz as Aapa
- Asad Siddiqui as Jamshed
- Beena Chaudhary as Farkhanda
- Awais Waseer
- Rashida Tabbassum

== Reception ==
The series was received positively and popular due to the chemistry of Faisal and Hina. On 4 October, it delivered 44,900 viewers. On 8 October's episode, it gathered 30,700 viewers. On 17 October, it gathered 16,000 viewers. On 31 October, it gathered 32,400 viewers. On 7 November, the show gathered 20,300 viewers. On 15 November, the show gathered 42,800 viewers. On 22 November, the drama had 52,300 viewers. On 28 November episode, it got up with 35,700 viewers. On 4 December, the show gathered 28,200 viewers. On 6 December, the show got 0.18% of share from Hum TV and delivered 64, 500 viewers. On 12 & 13 Episodes, it caught up with 20,500 and 30,100 viewers respectively. On 19 December, the channel once again remained at #2 and got 0.11% share catching 45,000 viewers. On 26 December, it was channel's most watched show with 33,400 viewers.
