= Maan (Pakistani TV series) =

- Genre: Family drama Serial drama Romance
- Written by: Syed Shehla Shakoor
- Directed by: Amin Iqbal
- Starring: Mikaal Zulfiqar; Kiran Haq; Maha Warsi; Seemi Raheel
- Opening theme: "Tu Mera Maan Hai Jahan Mera" by Rahat Fateh Ali Khan
- Composers: Raheel Fayaz; MAD Music
- Country of origin: Pakistan
- Original language: Urdu
- No. of episodes: 29

Production
- Producers: Abdullah Kadwani; Asad Qureshi; Mikaal Zulfiqar; Hira Anwar (Hum TV)
- Production locations: Karachi, Sindh; Lahore, Punjab
- Cinematography: Asif Yaseen
- Editors: Ahmad Ansari; Muzafar Ahmed
- Camera setup: Multi-camera
- Running time: 35–45 minutes
- Production company: 7th Sky Productions

Original release
- Network: Hum TV
- Release: 19 October 2015 – 6 May 2016

Related
- Karb; Jhoot

Maan (Urdu: مان ; lit. Proud) is a Pakistani family drama series that premiered on Hum TV on 19 October 2015, airing a weekly episode on Mondays. Due to the drama serial Mann Mayal, Maan aired on Fridays instead of Mondays from 29 January 2016. It is directed by Amin Iqbal and written by Shehla Shakoor. This drama serial is produced by Abdullah Kadwani and Asad Qureshi of 7th Sky Productions and Mikaal Zulfiqar who also served as the head of the project and Hira Anwar of Hum TV.

Meekal Zulfiqar and Kiran Haq star as parents of two girls and the younger girl has a heart problem. They are facing financial problems and can't afford surgery for their younger girl, which leads their family to destruction. Maha Warsi portrays a villainous role while Seemi Raheel stars as the mother of Zulfiqar and Saleem Sheikh as his brother.

== Premise ==
'Maan' revolves around the story of a married couple, Imaan (Mikaal Zulfiqar) and Wafa (Kiran Haq). They have two daughters lead happy lives. Things become difficult when their younger daughter is diagnosed with heart disease and they don't have the 6 million rupees needed for her treatment. In this condition, Imaan is forced to join a job that Maya (Maha Warsi), his first love, offers him. Maya asks Imaan for his hand in marriage and he accepts on the condition that she will pay for his younger daughter, Hania's treatment. His life changes as he has two wives and is left in a tiff as he has to care for both. His first wife eventually finds out of his betrayal and stops talking to him. He tries his best to explain but she is not ready to listen. Meanwhile, their younger daughter dies under the stress of her father's absence who swore he would return home but was unable to due to a meeting. During her funeral, Maya and Imaan go to the house to see Hania. Wafa, in a rage of anger yells at them that Hania's death was all caused by Imaan. She explains that her daughter waited and waited but her father didn't come home. After getting told to leave by his mum, Imaan and Maya return to the house unhappily. Maya plans to go on holiday to make Imaan happy but he is sad and feels guilty due to the words of Wafa. The drama explores their love for each other and the misunderstandings that caused a divide between them. In the end love triumphs, Maya gets her punishment and Imaan and Wafa live happily ever after.

== Cast ==
Main

- Mikaal Zulfiqar as Imaan
- Kiran Haq as Wafa
- Seemi Raheel as Bibi
- Maha Warsi as Maya
- Waseem Abbas as Rashid

Recurring

- Umair Tahir Rana as Arslan
- Naima Khan as Maheen
- Saima Saeed Malik
- Zain Afzal
- Saleem Sheikh as Nadeem
- Rana Aftab
- Imran Ahmad
- Eshal as Monunoo
- Kashaf as Hania
