= Munafiq (TV series) =

Pakistani family soap televisions series

- Official title card
- منافق
- Genre: Drama
- Written by: Hina Huma Nafees
- Directed by: Saleem Ghanchi
- Starring: Fatima Effendi; Adeel Chaudhry; Mariyam Nafees; Bilal Qureshi
- Country of origin: Pakistan
- Original language: Urdu
- No. of episodes: 60

Production
- Producers: Abdullah Kadwani; Asad Qureshi
- Production locations: Karachi, Sindh
- Camera setup: Multi-camera setup
- Production company: 7th Sky Entertainment

Original release
- Network: Geo Entertainment
- Release: 27 January – 15 April 2020

Munafiq (Urdu: منافق, lit. 'Hypocrite') is a 2020 Pakistani family soap television series premiered on Geo Entertainment on 27 January 2020. It is produced by Abdullah Kadwani and Asad Qureshi under 7th Sky Entertainment. The show revolves around Ujala (played by Fatima Effendi), who comes from a middle-class family. She confronts her insecurities upon her marriage into an upper class influential family. The series also features Adeel Chaudhary, Mariyam Nafees, Marina Khan and Mehmood Akhtar in pivot roles.

The show received major success; in the 7:00 PM slot and got a lot of YouTube views from Pakistan as well as India; it also trended in both countries on YouTube. It received the highest ever ratings for the 7:00 pm slot in Pakistan's history, by garnering TRPs of 22 and peaking at 30.3 TRPs. The series is also available on Viu app for Middle East region.

== Plot ==
The story centers on Ujala, a young woman from a poor family whose life changes drastically when her father—the sole breadwinner—dies in a factory accident. The incident also injures several other workers, sparking widespread protests from the victims’ families, who demand compensation for their loved ones.

The factory is owned by a politically influential woman, who fears the tragedy will damage her reputation and cost her the upcoming elections. In an attempt to regain public sympathy, she asks her son, Arman, to marry Ujala.

Although Arman agrees to the marriage, he refuses to truly accept Ujala as his wife because of her humble background. In her new home, Ujala faces constant challenges and emotional turmoil, as her husband continues to distance himself and spend time with other women.

== Cast ==
- Fatima Effendi as Ujala, Armaan's first wife, Sabiha's daughter-in-law and Anum, Raza and Zohaib's sister
- Adeel Chaudhry as Armaan, Ujala and Sobia's husband, Sabiha's only son, a politician (Dead)
- Mariyam Nafees as Sobia, Armaan's second wife
- Bilal Qureshi as Hamza, Armaan and Sobia's friend, Ujala's love interest
- Marina Khan as Sabiha Begum, A politician, Arman's mother
- Sajida Syed as Zareena, Ujala, Anum, Raza and Zohaib's mother
- Sabiha Hashmi as Armaan's grandmother, Sabiha's mother-in-law (Dead)
- Mehmood Akhtar as Ujala, Anum, Raza, and Zohaib's father (Dead)
- Agha Talal as Zohaib, Ujala, Raza, and Anum's brother (Dead)
- Hira Ahmed as Anum, Ujala, Raza and Zohaib's sister
- Owais Sheikh as Raza, Ujala, Anum, and Zohaib's brother
- Seemi Pasha as Shaheen, Sobia's mother
- Mizna Waqas as Ramsha, Hamza's cousin
- Imran Rizvi as Adeel, Ramsha's husband
- Kainat Angel as Noor, Hamza's niece
