= Aatish =

Aatish may refer to:

== People ==
- Aatish Bhalaik (born 1991), Indian cricketer
- Aatish Taseer (born 1980), British-born writer-journalist
- Khwaja Haidar Ali Aatish (1778–1848), Urdu poet from Lucknow, India

== Arts and entertainment ==
- Aatish (film), a 1979 Bollywood film
- Aatish: Feel the Fire, a 1994 Bollywood film
- Aatish (TV series), a 2018 Pakistani television series
- Aatish, a 2002 album by Faakhir Mehmood
- Aatish Rehman, a character in the 2023 Indian film Tiger 3

== See also ==
- Atiśa (982–1054), scholar of Madhyamaka Buddhism
- Atishi Marlena (born 1981), Indian politician, 8th Chief Minister of Delhi
