= Raaja Rani (TV series) =

2025 Pakistani television series

- Genre: Drama
- Written by: Sana Zafar
- Screenplay by: Sana Zafar
- Directed by: Amin Iqbal
- Starring: Faysal Quraishi; Hina Afridi; Javed Sheikh; Arez Ahmed; Haris Waheed
- Country of origin: Pakistan
- Original language: Urdu
- No. of seasons: 1

Production
- Production companies: BJ Production; MD Productions

Original release
- Network: Hum TV
- Release: 16 April – 5 September 2025

Raaja Rani (also spelled Raja Rani) is a 2025 Pakistani television drama series. It stars Faysal Quraishi and Hina Afridi in lead roles, alongside Javed Sheikh, Arez Ahmed and Haris Waheed. It premiered on Hum TV on 16 April 2025.

== Plot ==
The story follows Zaviyar, a wealthy businessman whose mental development is affected by a traumatic accident. His circumstances change after he meets Rani, a young woman who becomes involved in his life. As their relationship develops, conflicts involving family interests, personal ambitions and deception create difficulties for them.

== Cast ==
- Faysal Quraishi as Zaviyar Hamdani
- Hina Afridi as Rani
- Javed Sheikh as Zafar Hamdani
- Arez Ahmed as Junaid Hamdani
- Haris Waheed as Raja
- Ali Tahir as Shahid
- Huma Nawab as Shaziya
- Kaiser Khan Nizamani as Akbar Hamdani
- Hira Tareen as Mehreen

== Production ==
The drama was directed by Amin Iqbal and written by Sana Zafar. Its concept was developed by Abdul Khaliq Khan. The production was a collaboration between BJ Production and MD Productions.

== Reception ==
In its review of the series, Dawn discussed the performances of its principal cast and the development of its storyline. A subsequent review also highlighted the performances of Faysal Quraishi and Arez Ahmed.
