= Muhammad Ali Raza =

Pakistani actor

Ali Raza
- Born: Lahore, Punjab, Pakistan
- Education: Forman Christian College; University of the Punjab
- Occupations: Model; Actor
- Years active: 2020–present

Muhammad Ali Raza is a Pakistani actor and model who primarily works in Urdu television. Raza gained wider recognition for portraying Daniyal in the romantic drama Muhabbat Gumshuda Meri (2023). He further rose to prominence for his portrayal of Shahnawaz Shah in the drama series Iqtidar

== Early life and education ==
Ali Raza was born and grew up in Lahore, Punjab. He did a one-year diploma in graphic design at the Forman Christian College. Later he studied at University of the Punjab, earning his degree in arts and design.

== Career ==
Ali Raza started his career as a model in 2018. He made his acting debut in 2020 with Hum TV's drama Bhool Jaa Ay Dil.

In 2023, he appeared in the Pakistani dramas Meesni, Muhabbat Gumshuda Meri, Gunah and Mohabbat Kay Baad. In 2024, he was noted for his lead role in Iqtidar, which was well-received and crossed 1 billion views on YouTube, becoming only the thirteenth Pakistani drama to do so, and while still on air. In 2026, he starred in Leader, a political-romantic drama that was appreciated by the public.

== Filmography ==
=== Films ===
Year	Title	Role	Notes	Ref(s)
2022	The Legend of Maula Jatt	Jaggo's guard	Film debut	

=== Television series ===
Year	Title	Role	Network	Notes	Ref(s)
2020	Bhool Jaa Ay Dil	Hadid	Hum TV	Debut; Negative lead	
2023	Meesni	RAHEEL	Hum TV	Supporting role	
2023	Muhabbat Gumshuda Meri	Daniyal	Hum TV	Parallel lead	
2023	Mohabbat Kay Baad	Zaviyaar	Sab TV	Lead role	
2023	Gunah	Ahmad Ali Mir	Express Entertainment	Supporting role	
2024	Noor Jahan	Murad Ikhtiyar Shah	ARY Digital	Lead role	
2024	Iqtidar	Shahnawaz Shah	Green Entertainment	Lead role	
2024	Duniyapur	Nayab Adam	Green Entertainment	Supporting role	
2025	Dastak	Moiz Hassan	ARY Digital	Lead role	
2026	Leader	Mansoor Ali Shah	Hum TV	Lead role	
2026	Mirza Ki Heer	Mirza	ARY Digital	Lead role	
2027	Apsara		Hum TV	Lead role	

== Awards and nominations ==
Year	Award	Category	Work	Result	Ref(s)
2025	2nd Kya Drama Hai Icon Awards	Best Supporting Actor (Popular Choice)	Noor Jahan	Won	
2026	3rd Pakistan International Screen Awards	Best Onscreen Couple (with Anmol Baloch)	Iqtidar	Nominated	
