= Sila-e-Mohabbat =

Pakistani television series

- Written by: Nadia Ahmed
- Directed by: Adeel Siddiqui
- Opening theme: "Pal Do Pal Ka Andher Hai" by Muqaddas Azeem
- Country of origin: Pakistan
- Original language: Urdu
- No. of episodes: 40

Production
- Producer: Momina Duraid
- Camera setup: Multi-camera setup
- Production company: MD Productions

Original release
- Network: Hum TV
- Release: 11 October – 6 December 2021

Sila-e-Mohabbat is a 2021 Pakistani drama television series, produced by MD Productions. It stars Rabab Hashim, Noor Hassan Rizvi and Momina Iqbal in lead roles. The 40-episode series first aired Hum TV from 11 October to 6 December 2021.

== Cast ==
- Rabab Hashim as Alizeh
- Noor Hassan Rizvi as Tabrez
- Momina Iqbal as Rania
- Ali Safina as Raheel
- Arslan Asad Butt as Ahmer
- Waseem Abbas as Tabrez's father
- Shaheen Khan as Tabrez's mother
- Dania Enwer as Shreena
- Hassan Nizai as Anwar
- Agha Mustafa Hassan as Shahmeer
- Ayesha Mirza
- Farhan Ally Agha as Alizeh's father

== Production ==
The drama series was produced by Momina Duraid Productions. It was directed by Adeel Siddiqui and written by Nadia Ahmed.

Sila-e-Mohabbat is the third on-screen appearance of the lead couple Hashim and Rizvi after Amanat and Ishq Na Kariyo Koi.
