= Iqtidar =

2024 Pakistani television series

- Genre: Drama
- Written by: Hina Huma Nafees
- Directed by: Fahim Burney
- Starring: Anmol Baloch; Ali Raza
- Theme music composer: Arshman Khan
- Composer: Arshman Khan
- Country of origin: Pakistan
- Original language: Urdu
- No. of episodes: 62

Production
- Producer: Multiverse Entertainment
- Camera setup: Multi-camera
- Running time: 30–45 minutes
- Production company: Green Entertainment

Original release
- Release: 19 September 2024 – 18 April 2025

Iqtidar (Urdu: اقتدار , lit. 'Authority') is a 2024 Pakistani drama serial. The drama premiered on 19 September 2024 on Green Entertainment. The drama focuses on the life of politicians and public. It stars Anmol Baloch and Ali Raza in the lead roles.

It is written by Hina Huma Nafees, directed by Fahim Burney and produced by Multiverse Entertainment.

== Synopsis ==
Iqtidar follows the story of Mehr-un-Nisa Shehroz, a young woman who takes on the responsibility of supporting her family following the death of her father. Her life is further upended when her younger brother, Zeeshan Shehroz, tragically loses his life in a road accident involving Zain Shah, the son of a powerful politician, Saman Shah.

Devastated by the loss and frustrated by the attempts to cover up the truth, Mehr-un-Nisa sets out to seek justice. Her determination leads her into direct conflict with the influential Shah family, who attempt to suppress the incident through their political connections and social standing.

In a surprising turn of events, Mehr-un-Nisa ends up marrying Shahnawaz Shah, Zain’s elder brother. This unexpected alliance alters the balance of power and adds new complexities to her pursuit of justice. As the story unfolds, Mehr-un-Nisa is forced to navigate the emotional and political challenges that come with standing up for what is right, while finding strength and unexpected support in those around her.

The drama explores themes of power, accountability, family, and resilience, as Mehr-un-Nisa transforms from a grieving sister into a courageous advocate for truth.

== Cast ==
=== Main ===
- Anmol Baloch as Mehr-un-Nisa "Mehru" Shahnawaz (née Shehroz): Shehroz and Sadia's second daughter; Faiza, Muskan and Zeeshan's sister; Rafay's ex fiancée; Shahnawaz's wife.
- Ali Raza as Shahnawaz Shah: Saman and Suleman's eldest son; Zain's brother; Amal's ex fiance; Mehru's husband.

=== Recurring ===
- Rubina Ashraf as Saman Shah: Safdar's sister; Shahnawaz and Zain's mother; Suleman's widow.
- Ahmed Randhawa as Zain Shah: Saman and Suleman's younger son; Shahnawaz's brother. (Dead)
- Rabia Rizwan as Sadia Shehroz: Shehroz's widow; Faiza, Mehru, Muskan and Zeeshan's mother.
- Nouman Kahout as Rafay: Shehnaaz's son; Mehru's ex-fiancé; Urooj's ex-husband.
- Hareem Sohail as Urooj Feroz: Parveen and Feroz's daughter; Rafay's ex-wife.
- Roma Michael as Amal Shahryar (née Safdar): Beenish and Safdar's daughter; Shahnawaz's ex-fianceé; Shahryar's wife.
- Javed Sheikh as Safdar Shah: Saman's brother; Amal's father; Beenish's husband.
- Seemi Pasha as Beenish Safdar: Safdar's wife; Amal's mother.
- Emaan Khan as Muskan Shehroz: Shehroz and Sadia's third daughter; Faiza, Mehru and Zeeshan's sister.
- Atif Rathore as Feroz: Parveen's husband; Urooj's father; Shehnaaz and Sheroz's brother.
- Mizna Waqas as Parveen Feroz: Feroz's wife; Urooj's mother.
- Sabahat Ali Bukhari as Shehnaaz: Shehroz and Feroz’s older sister; Rafay's mother.
- Masooma Kazmi as Faiza Aftab (née Shehroz): Shehroz and Sadia's oldest daughter; Mehru; Muskan and Zeeshan's sister; Aftab's wife.
- Hassan Tauqeer Khan as Aftab : Faiza's husband.
- Sami Khan as Zeeshan "Shani" Shehroz: Shehroz and Sadia's youngest son; Faiza, Mehru and Muskan's brother. (Dead)
- Zohaib Bux as Shahryar Malik: Amal's husband.
- Fuzaan Khan as Dawud: Shah family's employee.
- Mariyam Jaffri as Sana: Saman's personal assistant.

== Reception ==
A couple of days before the show was released, a behind-the-scenes video was published on social media showing Baloch being picked up by Raza bridal style which was met with scrutiny by the public.

The series is presented in The Siasat Daily as a "mix of romance and drama" and one of the most watched in the country in 2024 while Dawn noted that it presented "comparatively formulaic story for the once-innovative Green TV but it is making the ratings because both Ali Raza and Anmol Baloch have worked hard on their characters, and kept the focus on their chemistry."

== Production ==
The female lead role was earlier rejected by Hina Afridi, who rejected the series to choose Raja Rani.
