= Dil-e-Gumshuda =

2019 Pakistani television drama serial

- Left to right: Agha Ali, Hina Altaf, Amar Khan, Mirza Zain Baig
- دل گمشدہ
- Written by: Saira Arif
- Directed by: Shaqielle Khan
- Starring: Hina Altaf; Agha Ali; Amar Khan
- Country of origin: Pakistan
- Original language: Urdu
- No. of episodes: 34

Production
- Producers: Abdullah Kadwani; Asad Qureshi
- Camera setup: Multi-camera setup
- Running time: approximately 40 minutes
- Production company: 7th Sky Entertainment

Original release
- Network: Geo Entertainment
- Release: 30 September – 14 November 2019

Dil-e-Gumshuda (Urdu: دلِ گمشدہ, lit. 'The Lost Heart') initially titled Margh-E-Ishq Se Pehle) is a 2019 Pakistani romantic television soap opera aired on Geo Entertainment. It is produced by Abdullah Kadwani and Asad Qureshi, under their production banner 7th Sky Entertainment. It has Hina Altaf and Agha Ali in lead roles with Amar Khan as an antagonist. The soap received high TRPs throughout its run. The performance of Khan as an antagonist received praise from critics.

== Synopsis ==
Dil-e-Gumshuda revolves around the themes of rivalry, revenge, and jealousy between two cousin sisters, Zara (Hina Altaf) and Alizay (Amar Khan). Zara hails from a middle class family and after the sad demise of her parents she is forced to move in with her uncle's family where she meets her cousin Alizay for the first time. Alizay is a self-centred and manipulative girl who cannot share her life with anyone, not even with her fiance Daniyal (Agha Ali). When Zara moves in, Alizay and her mother make it difficult for her to adjust as they humiliate and scold her for being an outsider. Both of them play multiple tricks to demean Zara in front of everyone and even steal the love of her life, Nadeem (Mirza Zain Baig). Zara is shattered when she finds out about Nadeem's change of mind and comes face-to-face with the harsh realities of life.

Will Zara continue to suffer under the atrocities implicated by Alizay or will she take a stand for herself?

== Cast ==
- Hina Altaf as Zara
- Agha Ali as Daniyal
- Amar Khan as Alizeh
- Mirza Zain Baig as Nadeem
- Shamim Hilaly as Khalida Aapa; Daniyal's mother
- Zainab Qayyum as Shazia; Alizeh's mother
- Khalid Anam as Jamal; Alizeh's father
- Humaira Bano as Nadeem's mother
- Ramsha Akmal as Nadeem's younger sister
- Fazila Kaiser as Zara's mother

== Soundtrack ==
Dil-e-Gumshuda's original soundtrack is composed by Naveed Naushad and vocals are provided by Nabeel Shaukat and Beena Khan. The lyrics are penned down by Fatima Najeeb.

== International release ==
The show was dubbed in Arabic under the title الحب الضائع and is available for streaming on Viu MENA. The show started airing in India from 6 June 2022, on Atrangii channel.
