= Rabab Hashim =

Pakistani actress

- رباب ہاشم
- Born: Karachi, Pakistan
- Education: Institute of Business Management
- Occupations: Actress, television presenter
- Years active: 2010–present
- Spouse: Sohaib Shamshad (m. 2020)
- Children: 1 daughter

Rabab Hashim is a Pakistani television actress and host. She made her acting debut with Na Kaho Tum Mere Nahi. She has played a role of Rukhi in Hum TV's acclaimed series Zid. She is also known for her leading roles in Piya Mann Bhaye, Anaya Tumhari Hui, Ishqaaway, Mannat, Marzi, Aik Thi Misaal, Kam Zarf and Meray Mohsin. In addition to acting, Hashim has appeared as a host and anchor in a few television programmes and sports shows. She also hosted Social Diaries and Shark Tank Pakistan.

== Early life ==
Rabab Hashim (often spelled as Rubab) was born in Karachi, Pakistan. She received her BBA (Hons.) with majors in Marketing from the Institute of Business Management (IBM), Karachi and received her formal training in theater arts from National Academy of Performing Arts (Pakistan) by graduating from there with full honors.

== Personal life ==
She married Sohaib Shamshad in November 2020. The couple welcomed a daughter, Myesha Sohaib Ali, in April 2023.

== Career ==
She made her television debut as a child reporter for Geo TV at age 10. Her acting debut on TV was with the Hum TV Na Kaho Tum Mere Nahi where she worked with Ahsan Khan and Saba Qamar and other senior actors. It was followed by a number of drama series, most recently Ishqaaway and Mannat. As of now, she is one of the leading actresses in Pakistan. In addition to acting and appearing in a number of commercials as a model, she has appeared as a host or anchor in a few TV programs and sports shows, including a sports show "Khelo aur Jeeto" on Geo Super and the T20 World Cup transmissions (ICC World Twenty20).

== Filmography ==
=== Television ===
| Year | Title | Role | Notes | Refs |
|---|---|---|---|---|
| 2012 | Na Kaho Tum Mere Nahi | Maya | | |
| 2012 | Daagh e Nadamat | | | |
| 2014 | Zid | Rukhi | | |
| 2014 | Tumse Mil Kay | Maira | | |
| 2015 | Piya Mann Bhaye | Mantasha | | |
| 2015 | Anaya Tumhari Hui | Anaya | | |
| 2015 | Ishqaway | Safina | | |
| 2015 | Mere Dard Ki Tujhe Kya Khabar | Zara | | |
| 2015 | Aik Thi Misaal | Bushra | | |
| 2016 | Mannchali | Ambreen | | |
| 2016 | Marzi | Manaal | | |
| 2016 | Mannat | Mannat | | |
| 2017 | Tumhare Hain | Zoya | | |
| 2017 | Amanat | Tehzeeb | | |
| 2017 | Mohabbat Khawab Safar | Neelum | | |
| 2017 | Main Maa Nahi Banna Chahti | Imaan | | |
| 2018–2019 | Ishq Na Kariyo Koi | Fariha | | |
| 2019 | Kam Zarf | Fouzia | | |
| 2019 | Meray Mohsin | Soha | | |
| 2020–2021 | Qarar | Fariha | | |
| 2021 | Sila-e-Mohabbat | Alizeh | | |
| 2022 | Angna | Ehsaal | | |
| 2022 | Tinkay Ka Sahara | Duriya | | |

=== Web series ===
| Year | Title | Role | Notes |
|---|---|---|---|
| 2019 | Enaaya | Maryam | Released on Eros Now |

=== Short films ===
| Year | Title | Role | Notes |
|---|---|---|---|
| 2016 | Honey Vs Money | | on Geo TV |
| 2017 | Loji Love Ho Gaya | | on Express Entertainment |
| 2017 | Saiyaan Motor Wale | Sitara | on ARY Digital |
