= Mannchali =

2016 Pakistani drama series

- Genre: Family drama Romantic drama Comedy
- Created by: Babar Javed
- Written by: Raheel Ahmed
- Directed by: Safiyah Zafar Usmani
- Country of origin: Pakistan
- Original language: Urdu
- No. of seasons: 01
- No. of episodes: 29

Production
- Producer: Babar Javed
- Camera setup: Multi-camera setup
- Running time: 40 minutes

Original release
- Network: Geo Entertainment
- Release: 25 April – 12 September 2016

Manchali is a Pakistani drama series that first aired on Geo Entertainment on 25 April 2016. It is produced by Babar Javed. The lead cast is Sami Khan, Rabab Hashim, and Zainab Jamil.

It marks the fourth on-screen joint appearance of Sami Khan and Rabab Hashim after Piya Mann Bhaye, Anaya Tumhari Hui, and Ishqaaway. After this serial they also appeared on Mannat together. In total they have appeared in five series as a couple, which were all broadcast on Geo Entertainment.

== Synopsis ==
Manchali is a story of two cousins, Ambreen and Afsheen, who are polar opposites but promise to stand with each other through thick and thin. Ambreen is disliked by her relatives because of her exuberant and outspoken nature while Afsheen is an innocent and kind-hearted girl who is in love with her next door neighbour, Arham. Arham lives with his mother, Surya Begum, and sister, Seema.

Afsheen’s love life is challenged when Moonis, who is Arham’s family friend and a potential groom for Seema, falls in love with Ambreen. To avoid complications between Arham and Afsheen’s relationship, Ambreen is afraid to reciprocate his feelings. Upon knowing Moonis’ interest, Surya Begum plans to get rid of Afsheen and Ambreen. On the other hand, Arham is constantly instigated against Afsheen and he starts to lose his trust in her. While Afsheen faces challenges in her marital life, Ambreen is bothered about her relationship with Moonis. Will the four of them be able to save their relationships or will they fall prey to their family politics?

== Cast ==
- Sami Khan as Monas
- Rabab Hashim as Ambreen
- Zainab Jameel as Afsheen
- Manzoor Qureshi
- Shaheen Khan as Afsheen's mother
- Shazia Gohar
- Hamid
- Gul-e-Rana
- Sidra Sajid
- Adnan Shah Tipu
- Shahida Murtaza
- Rameez Siddiqui
- Parwasha
- Mustafa Qureshi
- Humera Zahid
- Hina Rizvi as Nasreen
- Parveen Soomro

== Soundtrack ==
The original soundtrack for Manchali is "Awara Parinda" which is composed by Shuja Haider and the vocals are provided by Ghazal Ali & Nauman Shafi.

== See also ==
- List of programs broadcast by Geo TV
- Geo TV
- List of Pakistani television serials
