= Rabba Mainu Maaf Kareen =

Pakistani television series

- ربّا مینوں معاف کریں
- Genre: Drama; Romance
- Written by: Tahir Nazir
- Directed by: Kashif Zaman
- Starring: Hina Altaf; Hammad Farooqui; Jinaan Hussain
- Country of origin: Pakistan
- Original language: Urdu
- No. of seasons: 1
- No. of episodes: 38

Production
- Producers: Momina Duraid; Moomal Shunaid
- Production location: Pakistan
- Camera setup: Multi-camera setup
- Running time: approx. 42-44 minutes
- Production company: MD Productions

Original release
- Network: Hum TV
- Release: 19 February – 25 June 2020

Rabba Mainu Maaf Karin (Punjabi: ربّا مینوں معاف کریں, lit. 'Lord forgive me') is a 2020 Pakistani romantic drama television series co-produced by Momina Duraid and Moomal Shunaid under their production banners MD Productions and Moomal Entertainment. It features Hina Altaf, Jinaan Hussain and Hammad Farooqui in leads.

== Cast ==
- Hina Altaf as Zoya
- Hammad Farooqui as Fateh
- Jinaan Hussain as Zeenia (Zeeni)
- Tipu Sharif as Jawad
- Sabahat Adil as Zeenia's mother
- Beenish Raja as Sonia
- Saad Azhar as Arsalan
- Kauser Siddiqui as Zoya's mother

== Soundtrack ==
Rabba Mainu Maaf Kareen

Soundtrack album by Naveed Nashad
- Released: 20 January 2020
- Recorded: 2019
- Genre: Television soundtrack
- Length: 2:57
- Language: Urdu
- Label: Hum TV

Music video
- "OST: Rabba Mainu Maaf Kareen" on YouTube

The original soundtrack is composed by Naveed Nashad, with lyrics from Aehsun Talish sung by Naveed Nashad and Sanam Marvi.
