= Dil-e-Jaanam (2017 TV series) =

Television series

- Genre: Drama
- Written by: Seema Ghazal
- Directed by: Fahim Burney
- Starring: Zhalay Sarhadi; Zahid Ahmed; Hina Altaf; Imran Ashraf
- Original language: Urdu
- No. of seasons: 01
- No. of episodes: 21

Production
- Producer: Momina Duraid
- Production company: MD Productions

Original release
- Release: 1 March – 21 July 2017

Related
- Saya-e-Dewar Bhi Nahi; O Rangreza

Dil-e-Jaanam (Urdu: دل جانم, lit. 'My Sweetheart's Heart') is a Pakistani television series that first aired on 1 March 2017 on Hum TV. It features Zahid Ahmed and Hina Altaf in leads. Due to the low ratings the channel decided to off-air the series. The last episode was aired on 21 July 2017.

== Plot ==
Two cousins, Eshal and Shavez, are engaged from childhood. But conditions change, when Shavez starts taking interest in a girl, Asma. His parents, Rabiya and Rehman are unaware of fact and prepare to marry Shavez with his maternal uncle Usman's daughter Eshal. While, Eshal has a friend Haris, who helps her with all types of problems. Eshal does not have feelings for him but he loves her. On the wedding day, Shavez does his nikah with Asma and expresses his love for her in front of his parents. His parents are shocked to see them. A devastated Rabiya goes to apologize to her brother and sister-in-law. But they say her that it is not her fault. Shortly thereafter, Eshal’s parents arrange her wedding with someone else but the day before her wedding she is kidnapped. Shortly before being released Haris reveals his face to Eshal as he wants to threaten her and her family should she try to marry anyone else or tell anyone it was him that had her kidnapped. Everyone is oblivious of the fact that Haris had kidnapped her and are happy that Eshal is found. In the end, both Eshal and Shavez reunite and the drama ends.

== Cast ==
- Zahid Ahmed as Shavez
- Hina Altaf as Eshal
- Usman Peerzada as Rehman
- Imran Ashraf as Haris
- Zhalay Sarhadi as Asma
- Saba Faisal as Qudsia
- Shaheen Khan as Rabiya
- Anwar Iqbal as Azeem
- Shamim Hilaly as Rakshy
- Zarnab as salma
- Iqra Aziz as Sameera; Cameo
- Sabahat
- Mehreen
- Sofia Khan
- Aashiq Khan
- Kamal Khan

== Production ==
On being asked about her character on this project and why she chose to play it, Zhalay shared,

"My character is called Asma, she is a career driven woman who is very egoistical and is used to getting what she wants. She is also a woman in love and the combination of the two is deadly. I love doing challenging characters which have many shades. Asma is a real woman with true emotions and not just a symbol of evil or good. I was intrigued by the various colors in her personality and that is what drew me to this play".

== See also ==
- List of programs broadcast by Hum TV
- Zara Yaad Kar
