= Noor Jahan (2024 TV series) =

2024 Pakistani family drama series

- Release poster
- Genre: Family Drama
- Written by: Zanjabeel Asim Shah
- Directed by: Musaddiq Malek
- Starring: Kubra Khan; Saba Hameed; Ali Rehman Khan; Noor Hassan Rizvi; Hajra Yamin; Zoya Nasir; Ali Raza; Alina Abbas Shah
- Country of origin: Pakistan
- Original language: Urdu
- No. of seasons: 1
- No. of episodes: 33

Production
- Producer: Six Sigma Entertainment
- Editor: Zafar Ali Sodhar
- Camera setup: Multi-camera setup

Original release
- Network: ARY Digital
- Release: 25 May – 14 September 2024

Noor Jahan is a 2024 Pakistani family drama series written by Zanjabeel Asim Shah and produced by Humayun Saeed and Shehzad Naseeb of Six Sigma Entertainment. Saba Hameed played the titular role in the series as a domineering mother from a lower-class background who climbed the social ladder by marrying a wealthy man. She has three sons, each of whom marries a different woman, leading to various difficulties with her three daughters-in-law. The series became one of the highest-rated shows of Pakistan on television in 2024.

== Plot ==
Taking place in a Sindhi household, Noor Jahan (Saba Hamid) is the mother of three sons; Hunaid (Noor Hassan Rizvi), Safeer (Ali Rehman Khan) and Murad (Ali Raza). She has an assertive and dominant personality and belongs to upper class family where she takes decisions of her sons' lives.

Noor Bano (Kubra Khan) is the daughter of Mukhtiar Shah, the elder brother of Noor Jahan’s late husband, with an educational degree from abroad. Noor Bano is infatuated with Murad and eventually falls in love with her. Murad being the youngest son obediently follows her mother orders and becomes involved with Noor Bano under his mother's influence. Safeer is anxious and confused person. Jahan wants him to marry Sumbul (Hajra Yamin) but he is already dating a girl named Maha (Zoya Nasir). Hunaid being an elder son with anger issues, his life revolves around his mother's decisions and consent which affects his marital life. The story revolves around Noor Jahan's involvement in her sons’ life which ultimately brings chaos among the family members.

== Cast ==
- Saba Hameed as Noor Jahan Shah : Ikhtiyar's widow; Hunaid, Safeer & Murad's mother.
- Kubra Khan as Noor Bano Shah : Mukhtar & Noor Afshan's daughter; Murad's wife; Sikander's mother.
- Ali Raza as Murad Ikhtiyar Shah : Ikhtiyar & Noor Jahan's youngest son; Hunaid & Safeer's brother; Noor Bano's husband; Sikander's father.
- Ali Rehman Khan as Safeer Ikhtiyar Shah : Ikhtiyar & Noor Jahan's second son; Hunaid & Murad's brother; Sumbul's ex-husband; Maha's husband; Ikhtiyar Jr's father.
- Zoya Nasir as Maha Safeer Shah (nee Farhan) : Umaira & Farhan's daughter; Safeer's wife; Ikhtiyar Jr's mother.
- Noor Hassan Rizvi as Hunaid Ikhtiyar Shah : Ikhtiyar & Noor Jahan's oldest son; Murad & Safeer's brother; Safeena's husband; Insiya's father.
- Hajra Yamin as Sumbul Kumail Shah (nee Javaid) : Javaid's daughter; Safeer's ex-wife; Kumail's wife.
- Alina Abbas Shah as Safeena Hunaid Shah : Samina's daughter; Samreen & Mehreen's sister; Hunaid's wife; Insiya's mother.
- Yousuf Bashir Qureshi as Mukhtar Shah : Bakhtiyar's son; Ikhtiyar's brother; Noor Afshan's ex-husband; Noor Bano's father. (Dead)
- Musaddiq Malek as Kumail Shah : Noor Bano's maternal cousin; Sumbul's husband.
- Zanjabeel Asim Shah as Umaira Farhan : Farhan's widow; Maha's mother. (Dead)
- Yasir Nawaz as Ikhtiyar Shah : Bakhtiyar's son; Mukhtar's brother; Noor Jahan's husband; Hunaid, Safeer & Murad's father. (Dead)

== Reception ==
Gaitee Ara Siddiqi of The News International praised Saba Hameed's performance and the show's production values, but criticizes its unoriginal storyline, clichéd dialogues, and weak supporting cast. Javaria Farooqui of DAWN Images was appreciative of relatable storyline, strong female characters, and social commentary, with Hameed's standout performance but, the show's concept and male characters are criticized for lacking originality and depth.

== Awards and nominations ==
Year	Award	Category	Recipient(s) / Nominee(s)	Result	Ref(s)
2025	2nd Kya Drama Hai Icon Awards	Best Drama Serial (Critics' Choice)	Noor Jahan	Nominated	
2025	2nd Kya Drama Hai Icon Awards	Best Drama Serial (Popular Choice)	Noor Jahan	Nominated	
2025	2nd Kya Drama Hai Icon Awards	Best Performance in a Negative Role (Critics’ Choice)	Saba Hameed	Nominated	
2025	2nd Kya Drama Hai Icon Awards	Best Performance in a Negative Role (Popular Choice)	Saba Hameed	Won	
2025	2nd Kya Drama Hai Icon Awards	Best Supporting Actor (Popular Choice)	Noor Hassan	Nominated	
2025	2nd Kya Drama Hai Icon Awards	Best Supporting Actor (Popular Choice)	Ali Raza	Won	
2025	2nd Kya Drama Hai Icon Awards	Best Supporting Actor (Popular Choice)	Ali Rehman	Nominated	
2025	2nd Kya Drama Hai Icon Awards	Best Supporting Actress (Critics’ Choice)	Hajra Yamin	Nominated	
2025	2nd Kya Drama Hai Icon Awards	Best Supporting Actress (Popular Choice)	Hajra Yamin	Nominated	
2025	2nd Kya Drama Hai Icon Awards	Best Supporting Actress (Popular Choice)	Alina Abbas	Nominated	
2025	2nd Kya Drama Hai Icon Awards	Best Supporting Actress (Popular Choice)	Kubra Khan	Nominated	
2025	2nd Kya Drama Hai Icon Awards	Best Director (Critics’ Choice)	Musaddiq Malek	Nominated	
2025	2nd Kya Drama Hai Icon Awards	Best Director (Popular Choice)	Musaddiq Malek	Nominated	
2025	2nd Kya Drama Hai Icon Awards	Best Writer (Popular Choice)	Zanjabeel Asim Shah	Nominated	
2025	2nd Kya Drama Hai Icon Awards	Best Director of Photography	Zeb Rao	Nominated	
2025	2nd Kya Drama Hai Icon Awards	Best Assistant Director	Abdullah Abid Malik	Nominated	
2025	2nd Kya Drama Hai Icon Awards	Best Original Soundtrack	“Kehnda Si Ranjah” By Yashal Shahid	Nominated	
2025	24th Lux Style Awards	Best Ensemble Play (Critics' Choice)	Noor Jahan	Nominated	
2025	24th Lux Style Awards	Television Director of the Year (Critics' Choice)	Musaddiq Malek	Nominated	
2025	24th Lux Style Awards	Television Play Writer of the Year (Critics' Choice)	Zanjabeel Asim Shah	Nominated	
2026	3rd Pakistan International Screen Awards	Best Writer	Zanjabeel Asim Shah	Nominated	
2026	3rd Pakistan International Screen Awards	Best Director	Musaddiq Malek	Nominated	
2026	3rd Pakistan International Screen Awards	Best TV Serial	Noor Jahan	Nominated	
2026	3rd Pakistan International Screen Awards	Best TV Actress (Critics' Choice)	Saba Hameed	Nominated	
