= Muqabil =

2016 Pakistani television series

- Genre: Romance; Social drama
- Written by: Zafar Mairaj
- Directed by: Ali Hassan
- Starring: Kubra Khan; Mohsin Abbas Haider
- Country of origin: Pakistan
- Original language: Urdu

Production
- Producers: Fahad Mustafa; Dr Ali Kazmi
- Production location: Karachi
- Production company: Big Bang Entertainment

Original release
- Network: ARY Digital
- Release: 6 December 2016 – 23 May 2017

Muqabil (Urdu: مقابل) is a Pakistani drama television series directed by Ali Hassan, written by Zafar Mairaj. It originally aired on ARY Digital from 2016 to 2017 and stars Kubra Khan, Mohsin Abbas Haider and Asif Raza Mir in lead roles.

== Cast ==
- Asif Raza Mir as Mehmood
- Kubra Khan as Parisa
- Mohsin Abbas as Armaan
- Jinaan Hussain as Sara
- Saba Hameed as Parisa's mother
- Saife Hassan as Parisa's father
- Shaheen Khan as Armaan's mother
- Erum Azam as Armaan's younger sister
- Tara Mahmood
- Nadeem Asgher

== Plot ==
Not all parents can provide their children with everything, but attention is one of the most important things that they can at least try and give to them. Muqabil is a story of the quiet Parisa. Her mother who is full of herself and self-made.

Parisa however, marries a middle class man, Armaan, and finds her sanity in him. The kick is that this really confuses him that why would a girl who’s as rich as her would opt Armaan has her life partner. The two tie the knot, but the twist comes in when Parisa confesses to Armaan that the cause of her marriage with him was a man who raped her when she was young.

The story opens with Parisa (Kubra Khan) as a quiet and simple girl with reserved nature. She is taking psychotherapy and it is revealed that she has been molested when she was a child. She loves plants and the daughter of the maid Shareefa as she sees herself in her. Parisa's mother(Saba Hameed) was self-made and proud, she hates Parisa's doings and wants her to be positive in life and share with her responsibilities of NGO. Later it is revealed that it was driver of the hose that molested Parisa. Parisa begins to like the driver's son Armaan—a well educated man, who one day comes to see his father. The two marry after a long conflict between the families and Armaan's father requested Parisa to not tell anyone about his sin. Armaan meets Parisa's Psychiatrist and knows about her secret. Parisa tells Armaan about the incident that took place when she was ten years old. She told that his father was the one who raped her. Armaan was in drunken state and can't understand Parisa properly. When he come to his senses he realized what she said of his father and attempts suicide, however, he is saved. Parisa says that he should forget what she said, thinking that it was a dream, but Armaan refuses. He begins to hate both his father and Parisa. When his father learns that Armaan has discovered the truth, he eventually dies. Parisa held a press conference to tell her secret about child abuse to the world. She raises slogan against the child abuse and announces to be a part of her mother's NGO. The drama ends with Parisa united with Armaan starting a new life.

All Episodes of this show are Streaming on Indian OTT Platform MX Player App

== Accolades ==
| Category | Nominees | ref |
|---|---|---|
| 17th Lux Style Awards | Zafar Mairaj - Best TV Writer; Mohsin Abbas Haider - Best TV Actor; Kubra Khan - Best TV Actress (Won); Best TV Play | |
