= Aik Sitam Aur =

2022 Pakistani TV series

- Urdu: ایک ستم اور
- Genre: Drama
- Written by: firdosz Aftaab
- Directed by: Ilyas Kashmiri
- Starring: Anmol Baloch; Usama Khan
- Country of origin: Pakistan
- Original language: Urdu
- No. of episodes: 62

Production
- Producer: Humayun Saeed
- Production company: Six Sigma Plus

Original release
- Network: ARY Digital
- Release: 21 March – 26 July 2022

Aik Sitam Aur (Urdu: ایک ستم اور, transl. One more persecution) is a Pakistani drama series that aired on ARY Digital in 2022. It is written by Rehana Aftaab, directed by Ilyas Kashmiri and produced by Six Sigma Plus. It features Anmol Baloch and Usama Khan in leading roles. The series ended on 26 July 2022.

== Cast ==
- Anmol Baloch as Ushna
- Usama Khan as Shahroz
- Rubina Ashraf as Naeema (Shahroz's mother)
- Sajid Hasan as Wahab (Shahroz's father)
- Adnan Jaffar as Furqan (Ushna's father)
- Maria Wasti as Zainab (Ushna's mother)
- Salman Saeed as Sufyan (Raeesa and Rafaqat's son)
- Srha Asghar as Sadaf (Sufyans's sister)
- Shahood Alvi as Rafaqat (Sufyan and Sadaf's father)
- Ayesha Gul as Raeesa (Rafaqat's wife, Sufyan and Sadaf's mother)
- Adnan Jeelani as Shujaat
- Javeria Abbasi as Mehnaz (Shujaat's wife)
- Fahad Khan as Huzayfa (Mehnaz and Shujaat's son)
- Sabiha Hashmi as Ushna's grandmother
- Mehrunnisa Iqbal as Zunaisha (Shahroz's friend and ex-fiance)

== Production ==
Usama Khan agreed to do the role as he found the contrasting traits in the character quite interesting. It marked his second on-screen appearance with Anmol Baloch, the first being Noor (2020).
