= Ishq Na Kariyo Koi =

- Written by: Ali Moeen
- Directed by: Abdullah Badini
- Starring: Noor Hassan Rizvi; Rabab Hashim; Hajra Yamin
- Country of origin: Pakistan
- Original language: Urdu
- No. of seasons: 01
- No. of episodes: 25

Production
- Producer: Zeeshan M. Khan
- Camera setup: Multi-camera
- Running time: 30-45 minutes

Original release
- Network: Express Entertainment
- Release: 4 October 2018 – 31 March 2019

Ishq Na Kariyo Koi (Urdu: عشق نہ کریوکوئی, lit. 'Don't nobody fall in love!') is a 2018 Pakistani drama serial aired on Express Entertainment. The drama stars Noor Hassan Rizvi, Rabab Hashim and Hajra Yamin. The drama was first aired 10 October 2018.

== Cast ==
- Noor Hassan Rizvi as Faisal
- Rabab Hashim as Fariha
- Hajra Yamin as Maryam
- Humayoun Ashraf as Rehan
- Saba Faisal as Faisal & Rehan's Mother
- Javed Sheikh as Faisal & Rehan's Father
- Firdous Jamal as Fariha's Father ‐ Fashion designer
- Naushaba Bashir as Seema
- Javed Jamal
