= Pehli Si Muhabbat =

Pakistani TV serial

- Genre: Romance
- Written by: Faiza Iftikhar
- Directed by: Anjum Shahzad
- Starring: Maya Ali; Sheheryar Munawar; Hassan Sheheryar Yasin; Rabia Butt; Uzma Hassan; Paras Masroor; Hina Afridi; (for full cast see below)
- Theme music composer: Gohar Mumtaz
- Opening theme: Ali Zafar
- Country of origin: Pakistan
- Original language: Urdu
- No. of episodes: 37

Production
- Producer: Abdullah Seja
- Camera setup: Multi-camera setup
- Running time: 35-45 minutes approx.
- Production company: Idream Entertainment

Original release
- Network: ARY Digital
- Release: 23 January – 9 October 2021

Pehli Si Muhabbat is a Pakistani television romantic drama series that premiered on 23 January 2021 on ARY Digital and the last of its 37 episodes aired on 9 October 2021. The series is produced by Abdullah Seja under the banner of Idream Entertainment, written by Faiza Iftikhar and stars Maya Ali and Sheheryar Munawar in lead roles along with Hassan Sheheryar Yasin, Rabia Butt, Uzma Hassan, Paras Masroor, Umer Aalam and Hina Afridi in supporting roles.

== Plot ==
Aslam and Rakshi are neighbours in Hyderabad since childhood. However, Aslam has been staying at his maternal grandmother's home in Karachi for studies since last six years while Rakshi lives in Hyderabad. Aslam's mother Yasmeen and older brother Akram come to take him back and also fix his marriage to Bushra, daughter of his maternal uncle Dilawar. Bushra is secretly in love with Aslam but he only considered her as a cousin. Meanwhile, Rakshi's father Faiz Ullah marries Nargis, a woman from questionable background and much younger in age than him. Rakshi is somehow nervous and quite sad due to her father's marriage to Nargis. Due to latter's past and her background, neighbors surround Faiz Ullah's house and order him to leave the neighbourhood. Akram, instigated by neighbourhood folks, shows his anger and gets furious over this matter. Meanwhile, Aslam goes to rescue Rakshi as neighbors throw stones over her house. In first encounter, Aslam falls for Rakshi that night, remembering in flashback the memories of his childhood encounters with Rakshi when they were friends before him moving to Karachi. And from here, the love story of both begins. Aslam finds opportunities to see Rakshi, he waits for her while going to college and returning to home, follows her college van, waits for her to come on terrace building subtle romance. On the other hand, Akram again try to persuade Faiz Ullah in the case of Nargis but after his reluctance he asks neighbours to completely boycott Faiz Ullah and his family.

== Cast ==
- Maya Ali as Darakshan "Rakshi" Faizullah: Faizullah's daughter; Nargis's stepdaughter; Arif's widow; Aslam's love interest
- Aina Asif as young Rakshi
- Sheheryar Munawar as Aslam: Yasmeen's son; Akram, Zainab and Ahmad's brother; Bushra's husband; Rakshi's love interest; Darakshan's father
- Hassan Sheheryar Yasin as Akram: Yasmeen's son; Aslam, Zainab and Ahmad's brother; Ishrat's husband
- Nausheen Shah as Ishrat Akram: Akram's wife
- Uzma Hassan as Zainab Murad: Aslam, Akram and Ahmad's sister; Sikander's ex lover; Murad's wife (Dead)
- Paras Masroor as Murad Ali: Zainab's husband
- Saleem Mairaj as Sikander Nawaz: Nawaz and Nabila's son; Zainab's ex lover
- Saba Faisal as Yasmeen: Dilawar's sister; Aslam, Zainab, Ahmad and Akram's mother (Dead)
- Shabbir Jan as Faizullah: Rakshi's father; Nargis's husband (Dead)
- Rabia Butt as Nargis: Faizullah's second wife; Rakshi's stepmother
- Umer Aalam as Nadeem: Aslam's friend; Munazza's brother
- Faiza Mahmood as Munazza: Rakshi's friend; Nadeem's sister
- Sangeeta as Amma: Yasmeen and Dilawar's mother
- Hina Afridi as Bushra Dilawar: Dilawar's daughter; Aslam's wife; Darakshan's mother
- Nabeela Khan as Nabila Nawaz: Nawaz's wife; Sikander's mother
- Hina Rizvi as Mrs. Dilawar: Dilawar's wife; Bushra's mother
- Sajid Shah as Dilawar: Yasmeen's brother; Bushra's father
- Tariq Jameel as Nawaz: Sikander's father; Nabila's husband
- Faheem Azam as Arif Hussain: Sadaf's father; Rakshi's husband (Dead)
- Waqi Uddin as Ahmad: Yasmeen's son; Akram, Zainab and Aslam's brother; Sadaf's husband
- Aneesha Altaf as Sadaf Arif: Arif's daughter; Rakshi's step daughter; Ahmad's wife

== Soundtrack ==
"Pehli Si Muhabbat"

Song by Ali Zafar
- Language: Urdu
- Released: 17 January 2021
- Recorded: 2021
- Studio: Lightingale
- Venue: Lahore
- Length: 4:15
- Label: Idream Entertainment
- Composer: Goher Mumtaz
- Lyricist: Asad Shah
- Producer: Abdullah Seja
External videos
- Music video on YouTube
- Unplugged version on YouTube

== Accolades ==
Ceremony	Categories	Recipients	Result
21st Lux Style Awards	Best Emerging Talent in TV	Hassan Sheheryar Yasin	Nominated
21st Lux Style Awards	Best Song of the Year	Pehli Si Muhabbat (Unplugged)-Ali Zafar	Nominated
