= Pyar Kahani =

2019 Pakistani television film

- Genre: Comedy; Family; Romance
- Written by: Kishore Asmal
- Directed by: Aehsun Talish
- Starring: Hania Aamir; Asim Azhar
- Narrated by: Saife Hassan
- Theme music composer: Kalyan Productions
- Country of origin: Pakistan
- Original language: Urdu

Production
- Producer: Momina Duraid
- Cinematography: Irfan Kashmiri
- Editor: Farhan Atiq Khan
- Running time: 90 minutes
- Production company: MD Productions

Original release
- Network: Hum TV
- Release: 13 September 2019

Pyar Kahani (Urdu: پیار کہانی, lit. 'Love Story') is a 2019 Pakistani romantic drama television film written by Kishore Asmal, created and developed by Shahzad Javed, Head of Content, Hum TV, directed by Aehsun Talish, and produced by Momina Duraid under MD Productions. The telefilm stars Hania Aamir as a famous writer and Asim Azhar as a struggling writer.

== Plot ==
Masha, a famous story writer who also has a superstitious nature, is working on the last episode of her story Dil Kraye Per Khali Nahi Hai, (Note: lit. The Heart is not Empty for Rent) and keeps asking Gullu for some extension as he has to publish it on webstories.com. Meanwhile, her mother keeps ordering her to help in the kitchen as she believes Masha should also become a good housewife after marriage.

Meanwhile, Salaar is fired by his multimillionaire father for not accepting heirship position in the business, and pursuing his passion of story writing instead while continuously being rejected by multiple publishers including Gullu. He also treats his father's anger by giving him candies, so as to control his blood sugar level.

One day, Salaar writes a fan mail criticizing Masha's previous story. In a reply, Masha's friend Sumbul exchanges numbers and encourages Masha to keep in contact with him. After a few days of chatting, Salaar starts calling Masha at a restaurant for dates. Excitedly, Masha orders Sumbul to go instead, as no one else has ever known Masha in person and she wants her identity to remain a secret, while she also goes there disguised in a Burqa to keep an eye on them.

Later, Salaar reveals to his friend Nadeem that he is trying to win Masha's heart by making her realize he resembles her story's character Arsal, so he can use her name to publish his story and become famous; while Sumbul could only try to convince Masha that he is joking. But Masha is already falling for him as she helps him in his story.

Salaar gets his story accepted by Gullu. Meanwhile, he sees a girl arguing with Gullu to let her change the last episode before publishing; she thinks if Arsal dies, Salaar will also die. There, Salaar realizes that she is the real Masha and he has made a mistake by playing with her heart.

While Masha has edited and submitted a new ending, Gullu has already published the previous edition which has become an instant hit. Unfortunately, Salaar also gets injured in an accident. At the hospital, heartbroken Masha visits him with Sumbul where he asks for an apology; Masha, revealing her identity, starts beating him for his behavior.

Days later at Masha's engagement ceremony, her mother and Sumbul want to discuss about Salaar but Masha still does not want to think about him, whom she does not know is her groom-to-be as she has also blindly accepted the proposal without knowing the guy's details. While exchanging engagement rings, Masha cannot recognize Salaar due to her weak eyesight as she has not put her glasses on, while Salaar and other attendees are happy for both.

== Cast ==
- Hania Aamir as Masha Rehman
- Asim Azhar as Salaar Irfani
- Fazila Qazi as Masha's mother
- Anmol Baloch as Sumbul, Masha's friend
- Saife Hassan as Gullu Bhai, publisher at "webstories.com"
- Sajeer Uddin as Salaar's father, owner of Irfaani Group of Companies
- Kasim Khan as Nadeem, Salaar's friend who is a painter
