= Bandhay Aik Dor Say =

2020 Pakistani romantic television series

- Television release poster
- بندھے اِک ڈور سے
- Genre: Drama; Romance
- Written by: Faiza Iftikhar
- Screenplay by: Faizan Iftikhar
- Directed by: Ali Faizan
- Starring: Ahsan Khan; Ushna Shah; Hina Altaf
- Country of origin: Pakistan
- Original language: Urdu
- No. of seasons: 1
- No. of episodes: 37

Production
- Producers: Abdullah Kadwani; Asad Qureshi
- Production locations: Karachi, Pakistan
- Camera setup: Multi-camera setup
- Production company: 7th Sky Entertainment

Original release
- Network: Geo Entertainment
- Release: 25 June 2020 – 7 January 2021

Bandhay Aik Dor Say (also transliterated as Bandhay Ek Dour Se) (Urdu: بندھے اِک ڈور سے, transl. United by One Thread) is a 2020 Pakistani romantic drama television series produced by Abdullah Kadwani and Asad Qureshi under 7th Sky Entertainment. It is directed by Ali Faizan and written by Faiza Iftikhar. It features Ahsan Khan, Ushna Shah, and Hina Altaf. It is available to watch digitally on YouTube and in some countries on VIU App.

== Plot ==
Maheen and Umar are cousins living in the same neighbourhood. Roshini is Maheen's neighbour, who is a very clever and manipulative girl. Umar and Roshini are interested in each other. Umar comes to Maheen's house every day to meet Roshini at the terrace, without anyone knowing except Maheen. Knowing that Umar and Roshini love each other, Maheen wishes the best for them. Maheen's wedding is fixed, which is upcoming in a few days.

Some last-minute demand from the groom’s family lead to Maheen’s wedding being called off. To avoid humiliation, Maheen’s relatives then decide to marry her off to her cousin Umar. Maheen remains unaware of the change of plans until the last hour, while Umar, too, gives in to his family’s pressure. In their family's opinion, there couldn’t have been a better choice, especially after mistaking their friendship for love.

What no one else knew of is Umar’s feelings for Maheen’s neighbour Roshni. Although Umar only remembered the promise he had made to Roshni, Maheen knew more than that. She tries to tell Umar how his ladylove is already considering her other options, but he rubbishes it away.

Roshni finds her way back into Umar’s life almost immediately after getting rejected by another man. Maheen also gives up on her marriage and makes efforts to bring matters in Umar’s favour. Umar’s definition of love changes and he begins to question why Maheen is paving the way for his second marriage. However, it’s not easy for him to free himself from an extramarital affair with a person as manipulative as Roshni.

Umar calls Roshini, but she misbehaves with him and insults his family on the phone. Roshini goes to Maheen's house where Roshini questions Maheen's friendship and they both get into an argument. Umar arrives there and listens to Roshini secretly. All of Roshini's evil plans are revealed to Umar.

Umar confronts Roshini and tells her that there is no place for her in his heart. For the first time he addresses Maheen as his wife in front of Roshini. Roshini gets furious and attacks Maheen. Umar pushes her off but, Roshini then gets into an argument with Umar. Umar shouts at her and leaves with Maheen. The story ends with Roshini being all alone and furious while, Umar and Maheen happily live together.

== Cast ==
- Ahsan Khan as Umar, Maheen's husband
- Ushna Shah as Maheen, Umar's cousin, and later wife, and Roshni's friend
- Hina Altaf as Roshni, Umar's love interest
- Noor ul Hassan as Fareed, Umar's father
- Saba Hameed as Zakia, Maheen's mother
- Saba Faisal as Razia, Umar's mother
- Samina Ahmad as Umar and Maheen's grandmother
- Kamran Jilani as Mansoor, Umar's brother
- Madiha Rizvi as Najiya, Umar's sister-in-law
- Saima Qureshi as Zubeida, Roshni's mother
- Ali Rizvi as Munas, Maheen's brother
- Zohreh Amir as Fazila / Munas's fiance
- Birjees Farooqui as Jahangir's wife
- Seemi Pasha as Shaista (guest appearance)
- Adeel Chaudhary as Nabeel (guest appearance)

== Production ==
=== Broadcast ===
The serial was slated to broadcast on Geo Entertainment starting 25 June 2020, at 8:00 PM on Thursday nights, replacing Kahin Deep Jaley. However, after the end of Deewangi, the serial started airing on Wednesday and Thursday nights at 8:00 PM. In July 2021, serial was also aired on Geo Kahani.

== Awards and nominations ==
- Hina Altaf won "Best Supporting Actress (female)" at PISA 2021.
