= Sabiha Hashmi =

Pakistani actress (born 1960)

- Born: Sabiha Hashmi; 9 June 1960 (age 66); Karachi, Pakistan
- Education: University of Karachi
- Occupation: Actress
- Years active: 1990 – present
- Children: 3

Sabiha Hashmi (born 9 June 1960) is a Pakistani actress. She is known for her roles in dramas Fasiq, Dil-e-Momin, Jalan, Rang Mahal, Saaya Season 2 and Sirf Tum.

== Early life and education ==
Sabiha was born in Karachi, Pakistan and completed her education from University of Karachi. Later she also worked as a teacher at a private school.

== Career ==
Sabiha started working in PTV dramas in the 1990s. She also appeared in dramas Uraan, Bhabhi, Aik Thi Misaal, Guriya Rani, Khilona, Farwa Ki ABC, Gila Kis Se Karein, Dil-e-Beqarar, Andaaz-e-Sitam and Fitrat. She is also known for her roles in dramas Mere Bewafa, Deewar-e-Shab, Nand, Daraar and Rang Mahal. Since then she has appeared in dramas Saaya Season 2, Aik Sitam Aur, Wabaal, Adan, Farq, Dil-e-Momin, Khushbo Mein Basay Khat and Sirf Tum.

== Personal life ==
Sabiha is married and has three children.

== Filmography ==
=== Television ===
Year	Title	Role	Network
1991	Aahat	Principle	PTV
1993	Aanch	Shakira	PTV
2010	Uraan	Anisa	Geo TV
2014	Bhabhi	Faris's mother	ARY Digital
2015	Aik Thi Misaal	Zahida	Hum TV
2015	Guriya Rani	Nighat	ARY Digital
2015	Khilona	Sufiyan's mother	ARY Digital
2015	Farwa Ki ABC	Junaid's mother	A-Plus
2015	Gila Kis Se Karein	Sultan's mother	Express Entertainment
2016	Dil-e-Beqarar	Nazara	Hum TV
2016	Bandhan	Nazia	ARY Digital
2016	Izn-e-Rukhsat	Suraiya	Geo TV
2016	Mohay Piya Rang Laaga	Salma	ARY Digital
2017	Andaaz-e-Sitam	Salman's mother	Urdu 1
2017	Tishnagi Dil Ki	Hajira	Geo TV
2017	Jithani	Faizan's mother	Hum TV
2017	Faisla	Asad's mother	ARY Digital
2017	Mubarak Ho Beti Hui Hai	Faria's mother	ARY Digital
2017	Aadat	Ayesha	TV One
2017	Naseboon jali Nargis	Nargis's mother	Express Entertainment
2018	Aye Dil Tu Bata	Nazeer's mother	Geo TV
2018	Seerat	Amar's grandmother	Geo Entertainment
2018	Ishq Ya Rabba	Uroosa	A-Plus
2018	Thays	Raesa	A-Plus
2018	Mere Bewafa	Nighat	A-Plus
2019	Chand Ki Pariyan	Rafay's mother	ARY Digital
2019	Deewar-e-Shab	Izhaar's mother	Hum TV
2019	Kam Zarf	Shazia	Geo Entertainment
2019	Qismat Ka Likha	Mehreen's mother	Express Entertainment
2019	Gul-o-Gulzar	Jamal's mother	ARY Digital
2019	Soya Mera Naseeb	Basharat's mother	Hum TV
2019	Ghalati	Fahad's mother	ARY Digital
2019	Dard Rukta Nahi	Anna	Express Entertainment
2020	Nand	Jahangir's mother	ARY Digital
2020	Munafiq	Armaan's grandmother	Geo Entertainment
2020	Tamanna	Maghbool Bibi	Geo TV
2020	Fitrat	Ayaz's mother	Geo Entertainment
2020	Jalan	Tahoora	ARY Digital
2021	Fasiq	Amna	Geo Entertainment
2021	Rang Mahal	Zulekha	Geo Entertainment
2021	Dil-e-Momin	Naveeda	Geo Entertainment
2022	Mamlaat	Farooq's mother	Geo TV
2022	Daraar	Jahanara	Geo Entertainment
2022	Aik Sitam Aur	Ushna's grandmother	ARY Digital
2022	Makafaat Season 4	Momina's mother	Geo Entertainment
2022	Dil-e-Veeran	Sajjad's mother	ARY Digital
2022	Dikhawa Season 3	Sobia	Geo TV
2022	Saaya Season 2	Riffat	Geo Entertainment
2022	Wabaal	Shakir's mother	Hum TV
2022	Farq	Husna	Geo Entertainment
2023	Adan	Zaid's grandmother	Aan TV
2023	Dikhawa Season 4	Bisma's mother	Geo Entertainment
2023	Sirf Tum	Zubaida	Geo TV
2023	Khushbo Mein Basay Khat	Adeela's mother	Hum TV
2023	Dooriyan	Amina	Hum TV
2024	Dayan	Ibrahim's mother	Express Entertainment
2024	Dao	Azfar's mother	Geo Entertainment
2024	Dikhawa Season 5	Nuzhat	Geo Entertainment
2024	Amma Ka Kunba	Amma Sweet	PTV
2024	Aafat	Nasreen	Geo Entertainment
2025	Pheli Mohabbat	Sakina Begum	Hum TV
2025	Aik Lafz Zindagi	Nusrat	Geo Entertainment
2025	Kafeel	Javed's mother	ARY Digital

=== Film ===
Year	Title	Role
2019	Talash	Samina's mother
2019	Heer Maan Ja	Heer's mother
