= Saza e Ishq =

Pakistani TV series

- Genre: Romance drama
- Written by: Almas Khalid
- Directed by: Fahim Burney
- Starring: Anmol Baloch; Azfar Rehman; Humayoun Ashraf
- Country of origin: Pakistan
- Original language: Urdu
- No. of episodes: 40

Production
- Producers: Hammad Abass & Mukhtar Ahmad Chohan
- Camera setup: Multi-Camera setup
- Running time: Approx. 42-43 Minutes

Original release
- Network: Express Entertainment
- Release: 7 January – 10 November 2020

Saza e Ishq is a 2020 Pakistani romantic drama television series premiered on Express Entertainment on 7 January 2020. It is produced by Hammad Abass & Mukhtar Ahmad Chohan and directed by Fahim Burney. It has Anmol Baloch, Azfar Rehman, and Humayoun Ashraf in lead roles.

== Plot ==
The story revolves around an orphan girl named Rameen (Anmol Baloch). Her parents died in her childhood and she became the sole owner of her father's wealth and property. She likes her cousin Saim (Humayun Ashraf) but her aunt (Saim's mother), whom she is currently living with, fixed her marriage with Faris (Azfar Rehman) who belongs to rich background. The motive behind this was that she doesn’t want people to think that she fixed her son's marriage with Rameen due to her wealth. Saim was shocked by her mother's decision while Rameen silently accepts the decision as her aunt was the only one who took care of her after her parents' death. Soon after Rameen's marriage, her husband had an accident due to which he goes into a coma. Rameen is now taking care of her husband but she soon realizes that Faris will never recover from his coma. Considering Faris died, Rameen leave the house of her aunt. The family thinks that she has died. One day, Alizeh (Saim's friend) sees Rameen and takes Saim to Rameen's home. Saim is shocked and in the last episode Saim marries Alizeh.

== Cast ==
- Anmol Baloch as Rameen Faris
- Azfar Rehman as Faris
- Humayoun Ashraf as Saim
- Shaheen Khan as Faiza
- Khalid Butt as Salman
- Subhan Awan as Fahad
- Nida Khan as Naila
- Tauqeer Ahmed Paul as Sameer
- Kamran Jeelani as Mikaal
- Khalid Butt as Saim's father
- Sarah Aijaz Khan as Dania
- Noshaba Javed as Zainab (Saim's mother)
- Humaira Zahid as Farida (Dania's mother)

== Soundtrack ==
Saza e Ishq - OST

Soundtrack album by Rahat Fateh Ali Khan
- Released: 8 January 2020
- Recorded: 2020
- Genre: Television soundtrack
- Length: (2:18)
- Language: Urdu
- Label: Express Entertainment

Music video
- "Saza e Ishq" OST on YouTube

The title song is sung by Rahat Fateh Ali Khan. The music is composed by Sohail Haider and the lyrics written by Khalil-ur-Rehman Qamar.
