= Shaheen Khan (Pakistani actress) =

Pakistani actress

- Born: Multan, Pakistan
- Education: University of Multan
- Occupation: Actress
- Years active: 1998 – present
- Spouse: Farrukh Shahab
- Children: 3

Shaheen Khan is a Pakistani actress. She is known for her roles in dramas Mohabbat Mushkil Hai, Maryam Periera, Haara Dil and Dulhan.

== Career ==
Shaheen made her debut as an actress on PTV in 1998. She was noted roles in dramas Agar Tum Na Hotay, Kahani Raima Aur Manahil Ki, Ishq Mein Teray, Meri Beti, Chup Raho and Shehr-e-Ajnabi. She also appeared in dramas Takkabur, Ishq Parast, Tere Mere Beech, Thora Sa Aasman, Kisay Chahoon, Mannchali and Kathputli. Since then she appeared in dramas Barfi Laddu, Dulhan, Haara Dil, Saza e Ishq, Ghisi Piti Mohabbat and Zebaish. In 2018, she appeared in movie Wajood.

== Personal life ==
Shaheen Khan's first marriage ended in divorce when she was young, a situation she described as difficult and focused her attention on raising her son, working as a flight attendant in her youth to support her family. Later She married Farrukh Shahab and they have two children.

== Filmography ==
=== Television ===
Year	Title	Role	Notes
2008	Mushkbar	Farzana	
2008	Thoda Sa Aasman	Sahiba	
2012	Sargoshi	Zubaida	
2012	Kuch Ishq Tha Kuch Majboori	Aila's mother	
2012	Faslay Hain Darmiyaan	Faris's mother	
2012	Daagh-e-Dil	Fouzia	
2013	Tayray Pyar Kay Bharosay	Afia's mother	
2013	Shehr-e-Yaran	Munazzah's mother	
2013	Meri Beti	Asad's mother	
2013	Ishq Mein Teray	Saad's mother	
2013	Dil Awaiz	Aapa	
2014	Gumaan	Husna	
2014	Kahani Raima Aur Manahil Ki	Bunty's mother	
2014	Agar Tum Na Hotay	Shakra	
2014	Gar Maan Reh Jaye	Naila	
2014	Chup Raho	Rameen	
2014	Khata	Rabia's mother	
2014	Shehr-e-Ajnabi	Khalda	
2014	Khuda Na Karay	Farhad's mother	
2014	Chupke Se Bahar Ajaye	Saleha	
2015	Ishq Parast	Arsala's aunt	
2015	Khilona	Hira's mother	
2015	Takkabur	Mehru's mother	
2015	Tere Mere Beech	Zahida	
2016	Thora Sa Aasman	Ammi	
2016	Kisay Chahoon	Shakira	
2016	Anabiya	Khalda	
2016	Mannchali	Afsheen's mother	
2016	Khathputli	Zaitoon Bano	
2016	Teri Chah Mein	Shehnaz	
2016	Thori Si Bewafai	Mehru's mother	
2016	Muqabil	Armaan's mother	
2016	Ishq Nachaya	Sultana	
2017	Tumhare Hain	Fozia	
2017	Kesi Ye Paheli	Farhan's mother	
2017	Dil-e-Jaanam	Rabiya	
2017	Shiza	Shiza's mother	
2017	Amanat	Tahzeeb's mother	
2017	Teri Raza	Zarmeen	
2017	Meraas	Rukiya	
2017	Khudgarz	Hassan's mother	
2017	Mohabbat Mushkil Hai	Riffat	
2018	Woh Mera Dil Tha	Naina	
2018	Mere Khudaya	Aleena's mother	
2018	Haara Dil	Momina's mother	
2018	Tu Ishq Hai	Affan's mother	
2018	Maryam Periera	Ayesha	
2019	Barfi Laddu	Bibi Sheerini	
2019	Qismat	Asia	
2019	Mehboob Aapke Qadmon Main	Arsim's mother	
2019	Deewar-e-Shab	Shakra	
2019	Mohabbat Na Kariyo	Zara's mother	
2020	Bharaas	Almas	
2020	Ghisi Piti Mohabbat	Farkhunda	
2020	Saza e Ishq	Faiza	
2020	Zebaish	Natasha's mother	
2020	Dulhan	Kulsoom	
2020	Ghammandi	Firdous	
2021	Khwaab Nagar Ki Shehzadi	Meera's mother	
2021	Makafaat Season 3	Madiha	
2021	Yaar Na Bichray	Zeba	
2021	Baddua	Kausar	
2021	Sila-e-Mohabbat	Shagufta	
2021	Bad Niyat	Sania's mother	
2022	Inteqam	Seemi	
2022	Makafaat Season 4	Bushra	
2022	Dikhawa Season 3	Shazia's mother	
2022	Sirat-e-Mustaqeem Season 2	Shaista Begum	
2022	Mamlaat	Nasreen	
2022	Hoor Pari Noor	Saiqa	
2022	Meray Humnasheen	Aapa	
2022	Zakham	Naheed	
2022	Bikhray Hain Hum	Sarim's mother	
2022	Daraar	Naushaba	
2022	Oye Motti Season 2	Rukhsana	
2022	Mujhe Pyaar Hua Tha	Anisa	
2023	Nikah	Nighat	
2023	Pyari Mona	Irfan's mother	
2023	Sar-e-Rah	Amtul	
2023	Dikhawa Season 4	Aliya	
2023	Sirat-e-Mustaqeem Season 3	Amber	
2023	Hostel	Mariam	
2023	College Gate	Usman's mother	
2023	Mein Kahani Hun	Nabeela	
2023	Dil Hi Tou Hai	Saboohi	
2023	Baylagaam	Mehnaz	
2024	Raaz	Nudrat's mother	
2024	Rafta Rafta	Nasreen	
2024	Makafaat Season 6	Safia	
2024	Nasihat	Shanaya's mother	
2024	Dikhawa Season 5	Aliya	
2024	Chaal	Fariha	
2024	Kaffara	Suraiya	
2024	Bismil	Safia	
2024	Mooray Piya	Saira	
2024	Mehshar	Safiya	
2025	Aik Lafz Zindagi	Yasmeen	
2025	Goonj	Farkhanda	
2025	Manjhli	Munira	
2025	Chaalbaaz	Musarrat	
2025	Shikanja	Tahira	

=== Telefilm ===
Year	Title	Role
2014	Main Kukkoo Aur Woh	Zoya's aunt
2020	Yeh Dosti	Hania's mother
2020	Dil Tera Hogaya	Zubaida
2026	Tanka Laga	Afroz

=== Film ===
Year	Title	Role	Notes
2018	Wajood	Mrs. Samdani	
2024	Qabr	Begum Sahiba	Short film

== Awards and recognition ==
Year	Award	Category	Result	Title	Ref.
2025	10th Icon of the Nation Award	National Icon Award	Won	Contribution to Industry	
