= Deewar-e-Shab =

Pakistani television series

- Genre: Romance; Period drama
- Based on: Deewar-e-Shab by Aliya Bukhari
- Written by: Aliya Bukhari
- Directed by: Iqbal Hussain
- Starring: Nausheen Shah; Sarah Khan; Shehzad Sheikh; Zainab Qayyum; Tara Mahmood; Anmol Baloch; Osama Tahir; Kinza Hashmi
- Narrated by: Iqbal Hussain
- Theme music composer: Sahir Ali Bagga; Sohail Haider
- Opening theme: "Kya Hai Ishq"; Singer(s); Sahir Ali Bagga & Manwa Sisters; Lyrics by Imam Raza
- Ending theme: "Dewaar e Shab"; Singer; Beena Khan; Lyrics by Sabir Zafar
- Composer: Sahir Ali Bagga
- Country of origin: Pakistan
- Original language: Urdu
- No. of seasons: 1
- No. of episodes: 40

Production
- Executive producer: Momina Duraid
- Production locations: Wazirabad; Lahore
- Cinematography: Muhammad Aqeel; Hasnain Deswali
- Editor: Sheraz Fayyaz
- Running time: approx. 43-45 minutes
- Production company: MD Productions

Original release
- Network: Hum TV
- Release: 8 June 2019 – 21 March 2020

Deewar-e-Shab (Urdu: دیوار شب, lit. 'Wall of Night') is a 2019 Pakistani historical drama television series, based on the history of Heeramandi created and produced by Momina Duraid of MD Productions, and directed by Iqbal Hussain. It is the dramatization of the novel of the same name by Aliya Bukhari. The series has Nausheen Shah, Sarah Khan, Shehzad Sheikh, Shehroz Sabzwari, Bushra Ansari, Asma Abbas, Kinza Hashmi, Anmol Baloch, Hira Soomro and Osama Tahir as leading actors while Zara Noor Abbas, Iqbal Ansari and Mohsin Abbas Haider also make extended cameo appearances. The series premiered from 8 June 2019 to 21 March 2020 on Hum TV.

== Plot ==
Set in the early '90s when tawaifs are portrayed as classy women with etiquette but whom do not get involved in sexual activities. Sitara Jahan (Bushra Ansari) is well versed in the art of classical singing, music, and dance. She wants her daughters Feroza (Zara Noor Abbas) and Nagina (Nausheen Shah) to entertain her clients by singing and performing Mujra. Sitara wants to carry forward her family legacy with pride and doesn't view her craft in a negative light.

Nagina's life takes turn when Feroza runs away from Sitara Mahal; she eventually realizes that her family is falling apart and takes over Feroza's responsibilities to the best of her capabilities. Nagina has an extreme love-hate relationship with Faiz Ali (Mohsin Abbas Haider); a craftsman who is part of the family. Sitara Jahan especially takes care of him as he has no one in life. Faiz loves Nagina and on the contrary, Nagina hates him. As the story progress, Sitara forces Nagina to marry Faiz and she falls in love with him post-marriage. Later, she gives birth to her daughters Sandal (Hira Soomro) and Geti-Aara (Sarah Khan) which returns Sitara Mehal's life to some happiness but it doesn't last for long. Faiz Ali passes away after the birth of his daughters leaving Nagina widowed and their daughters father-less.

Nagina is the driving force of Deewar-e-Shab; her journey goes through a transition with the next generation, her twin daughters, Sandal and Geti-Aara.

== Cast ==
- Shahzad Sheikh as Salar; Geti Ara's husband, Step-son of Zartaj
- Sarah Khan as Geti Ara; Nagina's daughter, Sitara Jahan's granddaughter, Sandal's twin sister
- Bushra Ansari as Sitara Jahan
- Nausheen Shah as Nagina; Sitara Jahan's daughter
- Asma Abbas as Dildar Begum
- Anmol Baloch as Rabiya Islam
- Zainab Qayyum as Gul Naaz as Dildar's daughter
- Kinza Hashmi as Joya Izhaar
- Shahroz Sabzwari as Khayyam Yousuf; Feroza's son & Sitara Jahan's grandson
- Hira Soomro as Sandal; Nagina's daughter, Sitara Jahan's granddaughter, Geti Ara's twin sister
- Osama Tahir as Maaz Islam
- Tara Mahmood as Shaama
- Mariam Mirza as Sameera Kamal, Yousuf's second wife
- Syed Mohammad Ahmed as Ustaad Faraghat Baig
- Amna Malik as Gul Izhaar
- Ayesha Toor as Zubia
- Zara Noor Abbas as Feroza Jahan Yousuf's first wife, Khayyam's mother, Sitara's younger daughter (Episode 1–2)
- Mohsin Abbas Haider as Faiz Ali (Episode 1–5)
- Saife Hassan as Afsar
- Sabiha Hashmi as Izhaar's mother
- Iqbal Hussain as Baali
- Kamran Jilani as Islam
- Saima Qureshi as Shaista; Islam’s wife
- Saleem Mairaj as Izhaar
- Shaheen Khan as Shakra; Izhaar’s wife
- Faiq Khan as Salman Izhaar
- Ayesha Rajput
- Sarah Elahi as Almas; Gul Naaz’s daughter and Dildar Begum’s grand daughter
- Shamayel Tareen as Zartaj, Yousuf Kamal’s sister
- Hammad Shoaib as Nabeel
- Raja Haider as Yousuf Kamal; Khayyam and Zubia’s father
- Akbar Khan
- Zeeshan Khan
- Sajid Shah
- Talat Shah

== Music ==
Deewar-e-Shab OST

Soundtrack album by Sahir Ali Bagga & Manwa Sisters
- Released: 20 June 2019
- Recorded: 2019
- Genre: Television soundtrack
- Length: (2:21)
- Language: Urdu
- Label: M.D Productions
- Producer: Momina Duraid
External media
Audio
- "Deewar e Shab" on SoundCloud
Video
- "Deewar-e-Shab" OST on YouTube

The original soundtrack of the serial Kya Hai Ishq was composed by Sahir Ali Bagga while the lyrics were penned by Imran Raza.

The OST was performed by Sahir Ali Bagga along with Manwa sister.

The opening theme of the serial Deewar-e-Shab Ke Paar Hai Hum was performed by Beena Khan while lyrics were written by Sabir Zafar.

=== Track listing ===
No.	Title	Lyrics	Artist(s)	Length
1.	"Kya Hai Ishq"	Imran Raza	Sahir Ali Bagga	2:21
2.	"Deewar-e-Shab Ke paar Hain Hum"	Sabir Zafar	Beena Khan

== Reception ==
Initially, the show received positive reviews from the critics and received well ratings as well. Having 2.4 TRPs of first episode, 5.9 TRPs of fifth episode, 5.4 TRPs of eighth episode, it gained good ratings consistently.

== Accolades ==
Year	Award Show	Category	Name	Result	Ref
2020	1st Pakistan International Screen Awards	Best TV Actress	Sarah Khan	Nominated	
