= Abhi (2024 film) =

2025 Pakistani film by Asad Mumtaz Malik

- Theatrical release poster
- Urdu: ابھی
- Directed by: Asad Mumtaz Malik
- Screenplay by: Shoaib Rabbani
- Story by: Goher Mumtaz
- Produced by: Muhammad Waleed Abbas, Goher Mumtaz, Ali Chaudry
- Starring: Kubra Khan; Goher Mumtaz
- Production companies: Pennine Kennedy Productions; GM Productions
- Distributed by: Hum Films
- Release date: 17 June 2024 (Pakistan)
- Running time: 135 minutes
- Country: Pakistan
- Language: Urdu
- Box office: Rs. 5 crore (US$180,000)

Abhi, (ابھی), is a 2024 Pakistani Urdu language film, directed by Asad Mumtaz Malik, Produced by Muhammad Waleed Abbas And Goher Mumtaz, features a storyline and music composed by Goher himself. Starring Kubra Khan and Goher Mumtaz in lead roles, it was released on 17 June 2024, coinciding with Eid-ul-Adha. Premier of film took place in Karachi on 23 June 2024.

== Premise ==
The story follows a young Kashmiri boy who, after being forced to flee his home in Indian-occupied Kashmir with his elder brother due to challenging circumstances, resettles in Azad Jammu and Kashmir. When Zara visits the region, she convinces him to travel with her to Lahore, where he is mistakenly kidnapped, setting off a series of unexpected events.

== Cast ==
- Kubra Khan as Zara
- Goher Mumtaz as Hamza Ahmed
- Saleem Sheikh as Haroon
- Adnan Shah Tipu
- Mehmood Aslam
- Hina Khawaja Bayat
- Shahzad Nawaz
- Hareem Farooq
- Muhammad waleed Abbas

== Soundtrack ==
The song "Pyar Da Nasha" was released on 10 June 2024.

All music is composed by Goher Mumtaz.

No.	Title	Singer(s)	Length
1.	"Pyar Da Nasha"	Goher Mumtaz
Total length:			22:20

== Production ==
In March 2022, it reported that upcoming film Abhi, a romance-thriller will star Kubra Khan and Goher Mumtaz. The film's story was conceptualized by Mumtaz, who also penned the script five years ago. The teaser of the film was released in the same month. According to Khan, she agreed to do the film because it addressed the issues of minorities. In an interview with Arab News, she revealed that the film highlights the issues of minorities and has a strong Kashmir connection. She also revealed that her character, Zara, bears a strong resemblance to her own personality.

The film has been shot in various locations across Pakistan, including Kashmir, Lahore, Khyber Pakhtunkhwa, Balochistan, and Sindh.

== Reception ==
=== Critical response ===
The film was criticised for a weak storyline, inconsistent character development, disjointed editing, and unimpressive soundtrack, along with the leads' lacklustre performances. However, he praised Asad Mumtaz's cinematography for giving the film a "big-screen" aesthetic and acknowledged Kashif Javed's dedication to his role despite limited screen time. Another critique appreciated the on-screen chemistry between the leads, Ali Kazmi's performance, the music, cinematography, and production design. Yet, flaws in the storyline, character development, plot inconsistencies, misplaced humour, and the film's slow pace were pointed out.

== Awards and nominations ==
Year	Award	Category	Recipient(s) / Nominee(s)	Result	Ref(s)
2025	24th Lux Style Awards	Film Actor of the Year - Female	Kubra Khan	Nominated	

== See also ==
- List of Pakistani films of 2024
