= Leader (TV series) =

2026 Pakistani television series

- Genre: Political drama
- Written by: Radain Shah
- Directed by: Asad Mumtaz Malik
- Starring: Ali Raza; Kinza Hashmi; Faran Tahir; Sachal Afzal
- Country of origin: Pakistan
- Original language: Urdu
- No. of episodes: 28

Production
- Producer: Momina Duraid
- Production company: MD Productions

Original release
- Network: Hum TV
- Release: 28 March – 20 September 2026

Leader is a 2026 Pakistani television series written by Radain Shah and directed by Asad Mumtaz Malik. Produced by Momina Duraid under MD Productions, it stars Ali Raza and Kinza Hashmi in lead roles, alongside Faran Tahir, Sachal Afzal, Ali Safina and Yousuf Bashir Qureshi. The series premiered on Hum TV on 28 March 2026.

The series revolves around Mansoor Ali Shah, a farmer's son who becomes involved in university student politics and challenges the influence of powerful political figures. His growing relationship with Rubab, the daughter of his political opponent, complicates his ambitions and personal convictions.

== Cast ==
=== Main cast ===
- Ali Raza as Mansoor Ali Shah, a student leader and farmer's son
- Kinza Hashmi as Rubab, the daughter of Agha Wasif
- Faran Tahir as Agha Wasif, a powerful politician and feudal lord
- Sachal Afzal as Assistant Commissioner Asif, Agha Wasif's nephew

=== Supporting cast ===
- Yousuf Bashir Qureshi
- Ali Safina
- Nadia Hussain
- Sohail Masood
- Samia Noreen
- Muhammad Afzal
- Abdullah Ashraf
- Saqib Sameer
- Haya Khan

== Reception ==
In a review by the DAWN Images, the reviewer Dr Amber Javed Malik found the serial, "engaging due to its performances and its willingness to go beyond conventional family or romance-driven formulas" but faulted it for its execution.
