= Andaaz-e-Sitam =

- Title screen
- Genre: Romance; Drama
- Written by: Enam Hasan
- Directed by: Ali Hassan
- Starring: Agha Ali; Faris Shafi; Kubra Khan; Ali Ansari; Irsa Ghazal; Manzoor Qureshi
- Country of origin: Pakistan
- Original language: Urdu
- No. of seasons: 1
- No. of episodes: 23

Production
- Producers: Fahad Mustafa; Dr. Ali Kazmi.
- Production location: Karachi
- Production company: Big Bang Entertainment

Original release
- Network: Urdu 1
- Release: 5 January – 8 June 2017

Andaz-e-Sitam (Urdu: اندازِ ستم, lit. 'The style of tyranny') was a Pakistani drama television series directed by Ali Hassan, written by Enam Hasan. It originally aired on Urdu 1 from 5 January 2017 to 8 June 2017. Kubra Khan played the lead role.

== Plot ==
Andaz-e-Sitam is a story of a confident, bold and blunt girl named Ayaat, who returns from the US during a semester break. Back home, she encounters her younger brother's college friend, Wamiq, who is an arrogant, spoiled brat.

At one point, Wamiq makes moves on her, causing Ayaat to slap him. Wamiq abducts her to get back at her. While in his custody, Wamiq offers her the opportunity to marry him, maintaining that she would be raped either way. She hesitantly agrees to the marriage. After the wedding, and subsequent marital rape, however, he burns the marriage papers. He then threatens the man who solemnized their wedding to stay silent, leaving Ayaat with no evidence of their marriage.

Meanwhile, the police suspect that Salman, an admirer of Ayaat, has abducted her. When she returns home, however, Ayaat tells her side of the story and Salman is released. Soon after, the family finds out that Ayaat is pregnant with Wamiq's child. Ayaat goes to court and fights for justice, however, loses the case. Afterwards, Wamiq admires her confidence and holds a press conference confessing to all his crimes, accepting to be the father of her unborn child and proposes to her.

Wamiq's mother, an influential social worker who runs an NGO, sweeps the incident under the rug and requests Ayaat to marry him in order to preserve their honor. Ayaat refuses and instead pursues a divorce. This leads to Ayaat's father dying from lament. Following a series of emotional events, she maintains that she will not marry him and will never forgive him for what he did.

Meanwhile, a love blossoms between Ayaat and Salaman and they marry. She soon gets pregnant with Salman's child. Wamiq kidnaps Ayaat again, as well as their son, and forces her to divorce Salaman. Salaman, however, arrives at the scene and shoots Wamiq, saving his lover and his marriage. Ayaat and Salaman then live happily every after with their two children.

== Cast ==
- Kubra Khan as Aayat
- Agha Ali as Wamik
- Faris Shafi as Salman
- Ali Ansari as Samar
- Irsa Ghazal as Begum Nawazish
- Manzoor Qureshi as Mirza Ahmed
- Janita Asma
- Shaista Jabeen
- Mehwish Qureshi
- Sabiha Hashmi as Salman's mother
