= Main Maa Nahi Banna Chahti =

- Title screen
- Genre: Drama
- Written by: Mustafa Hashmi
- Story by: Parisa Siddiqui
- Directed by: Furqan Adam
- Starring: Rabab Hashim; Imran Ashraf; Ali Abbas
- Country of origin: Pakistan
- Original language: Urdu
- No. of episodes: 36

Production
- Executive producer: Moomal Shunaid
- Producer: Rafay Rashdi
- Camera setup: Multi-camera setup
- Production company: Moomal Productions

Original release
- Network: Hum TV
- Release: 18 October 2017 – 15 February 2018

Main Maa Nahi Banna Chahti (transl. I don't want to become a mother) is a Pakistani drama serial produced by Moomal Shunaid under their banner Moomal Productions. The drama stars Imran Ashraf and Rabab Hashim in the lead roles, and premiered on 18 October 2017 on Hum TV, airing every Wednesday and Thursday at 9:10 PM.

The serial focuses on cousin marriages and the risks of birth defects.

== Cast ==
- Rabab Hashim as Imaan
- Ali Abbas as Jibran
- Rubina Ashraf as Jibran's mother
- Nida Mumtaz as Imaan's mother
- Imran Ashraf as Faris
- Fatima Jilani
- Erum Bashir as Maham
- Rimha Ahmed
