= Aik Thi Misaal =

2015 Pakistani drama serial

- Genre: Drama; Telenovela
- Written by: Rukhsana Nigar
- Directed by: Shaquille Khan
- Starring: Hina Altaf; Emmad Irfani; Rabab Hashim
- Theme music composer: Waqar Ali
- Opening theme: "Kabhi Socha Na Tha Maine" by Tina Sani
- Country of origin: Pakistan
- Original language: Urdu
- No. of seasons: 1
- No. of episodes: 36

Production
- Producer: Momina Duraid
- Editor: Jamil Awan
- Camera setup: Multi-camera
- Running time: 30 – 45 minutes

Original release
- Network: Hum TV
- Release: 14 September 2015 – 12 January 2016

Aik Thi Misaal (Urdu: ایک تھی مثال) is a Pakistani television program that was based on a novel of the same name by Rukhsana Nigar. It was first aired on 14 September 2015 on Hum TV. It was directed by Shaquille Khan and written by Rukhsana Nigar. The teledrama ended on 12 January 2016.

== Story ==
Ek Thi Misal highlights the situation of the young girl Misal, whose perfect world is flipped around on account of the desire and envy of her close relative and grandma, prompting her parents' separation. It is concurred that Misal will spend 15 days of the month with her dad and the rest of the 15 with her mom.

Here begins the predicament and hardships of Misal as her life swings between her mom's and dad's homes. Both her parents remarry to go ahead with their lives, yet for Misal, the sentiment of dismissal from her parents and hatred of her stepmother, stepfather and whatever is left of the family develops with each passing day.

== Characters ==
=== First Generation ===
Adeel
Adeel is the male protagonist and Misaal's father. He married Bushra. The couple had a daughter, Misaal. The couple separated because of a dispute. He then married Iffat.
Bushra
Bushra is the female protagonist and first wife of Adeel. She had a daughter, Misaal. They were separated because of a disputes between her and her husband, Adeel. She later married Ahsan. She had a daughter, Rania.
Iffat
Iffat is the second wife of Adeel. She always disliked Misaal and her mother, Bushra. She thinks that Adeel had always loved Misaal more than her and her children, but Adeel had always treated everyone equally.
Aasma
is the teacher of Misaal and the mother of Wasik and Warda.
Waqar
Waqar is the friend of Adeel and father of Fahad. He moved his proposal forward of marrying his son with Adeel's daughter Misaal. The Nikah was not accepted as Fahad had already married a woman, Laila, and had a daughter.

=== Second Generation ===
Misaal
(Portrayed by Hina Altaf ): Misaal is the daughter of Adeel and Bushra. Misaal was first liked by her foster brother Saifi. Ahsan finally sent Misaal from his home. Misaal now lived with her father and his second wife, Iffat, and her children. Iffat always disliked Misaal, as her father liked her more than her daughter and son. Iffat became happy after her engagement with Fahad. The Nikah was cancelled at the last moment because Fahad had already married Laila and had a daughter. Wasik took the proposal of marrying Misaal;Adeel accepted. The problems between Wasik and Pari let Wasik hate Misaal.
Fahad
Fahad is the son of waqar. He married Laila and spent more time in office work. Adeel decided to marry his daughter to Waqar's son, Fahad. Waqar kept his son's marriage with Laila a secret to Adeel. This made Adeel angry with Waqar.
Dani
Dani, also known as Daniyal, is the son of Adeel through his second wife Iffat. He was a careless, spoilt boy and a smoker. He always failed in his studies and made his father angry.
Rania
Rania is the daughter of Bushra, through her second husband Ahsan. She is half sister of Saifi (through Ahsan). She is the half sister of Misaal (through Bushra).
Saifi
Saifi is the son of Ahsan and his first wife (name not known). He is half brother of Rania. He is the foster brother of Misaal. He always liked Misaal. He always misbehaved with Misaal.
Wasik
Wasik is the son of Misaal's teacher. When Misaal first came into her teacher's home. Wasik saw her and liked her. He said that she would be his first and last love, but Misaal ignored him. Wasik was liked by Pari, daughter of Iffat, but Wasik didn't like Pari. She later disliked Misaal as Wasik married Misaal.
Warda
Warda is the daughter of Misaal's teacher and sister of Wasik. She disliked Misaal as she was Pari's (Iffat's daughter) best friend, and Warda always wanted her brother Wasik to marry Pari.

== Cast ==
- Hina Altaf Khan as Misaal
- Emmad Irfani as Adeel
- Rabab Hashim as Bushra
- Muneeb Butt as Wasiq
- Sara Saif as Misaal (Young)
- Hira Pervaiz as Iffat
- Hasan Ahmed as Ahsan
- Mahi Baloch as Pareezay (Pari)
- Huma Nawab as Asma
- Zainab Qayyum as Fouzia
- Sabiha Hashmi as Zahida
- Jahanara Hai as Missal's grandmother
- Mubashira Khanum as Adeel's mother
- Ali Ansari as Saifi
- Sajida Syed as Bushra's mother
- Jahanzeb Khan as Imran
- Mustufa Kazmi
- Hammad Khan As Saifi (Young)

== Broadcast and release ==
- It was aired on Hum Europe in UK, on Hum TV USA in USA and Hum TV Mena on UAE, with same timings and 14 September 2015 being the premier date. All International broadcasting aired the series in accordance with their standard times.
- In 2018, the show premiered on MBC 2.

Aik Thi Misaal is available digitally on Eros Now app to stream online.

== See also ==
- List of programs broadcast by Hum TV
