= Ghulam Bashah Sundri =

2026 Pakistani television series

- Genre: Drama
- Written by: Zanjabeel Asim Shah
- Directed by: Amin Iqbal
- Starring: Imran Ashraf; Zaviyar Nauman Ijaz; Hina Afridi
- Country of origin: Pakistan
- Original language: Urdu
- No. of episodes: 42

Production
- Producers: Babbar Javaid; Syed Ali Murtaza Obaid
- Production company: BJ Productions

Original release
- Network: Green Entertainment
- Release: 12 January 2026

Ghulam Bashah Sundri is a 2026 Pakistani television drama series written by Zanjabeel Asim Shah and directed by Amin Iqbal. Produced by Babar Javaid and Syed Ali Murtaza Obaid under the banner of BJ Productions, the series stars Imran Ashraf, Zaviyar Nauman Ijaz and Hina Afridi in leading roles. It premiered on Green Entertainment on 12 January 2026.

== Plot ==
The story revolves around Ghulam, a trained doctor who has spent much of his life serving a powerful feudal family. He works as a trusted aide and protector to Bashah, the heir to the family's influence and authority.

The two men develop feelings for Sundri, a young woman whose independence and personality bring her into conflict with the powerful people around her. Their contrasting approaches to love create a rivalry that reflects the unequal relationships between individuals and those who hold social and political power.

== Cast ==
- Imran Ashraf as Ghulam
- Zaviyar Nauman Ijaz as Bashah
- Hina Afridi as Sundri
- Shahzad Nawaz as Jhandad
- Alyy Khan as Ashiq Ali
- Salma Asim as Sahib Jan
- Tazeen Hussain as Khursheed
- Adnan Shah Tipu as Qurban Ali
- Saima Qureshi as Lajo
- Saleena Sipra as Zarina
- Maham Naqvi as Murk
- Saima Baloch as Motia
- Fouzia Mushtaq as Bua

== Reception ==
In a review published in Dawn on 25 January 2026, Sadaf Haider discussed the series' visual style, performances and narrative. The review noted Amin Iqbal's emphasis on cinematic presentation and action, while questioning the depth of the characterisation.

The review also examined Imran Ashraf's portrayal of Ghulam, Zaviyar Nauman Ijaz's performance as Bashah and Hina Afridi's interpretation of Sundri. Haider described the programme as light entertainment aimed at viewers who enjoy commercial melodrama.
