= Saba Faisal =

Pakistani actress

- Occupations: Actress; Newscaster
- Years active: 1981–present
- Spouse: Faisal Saeed
- Children: 3

Saba Faisal (Punjabi, Urdu: صبا فیصل) is a Pakistani actress and former news anchor.

== Personal life ==
Faisal is married to her cousin Faisal Saeed. All three of their children – Arsalan, Salman, and Sadia – are actors.

== Career ==
In 2012, Faisal played the nagging mother-in-law of the protagonist in drama Durr-e-Shehwar. While praising her performance, Usman Ghafoor of The News on Sunday opined that, "Saba is a complete revelation".

== Filmography ==
=== Television series ===
Year	Title	Role	Network	Refs
2000	Chamak	Nazia	PTV	
2009	Tum Jo Miley	Sadiqa	Hum TV	
2009	Sirf Tumhare Liye	Javeria	PTV	
2010	Mera Saaein	Wajahat's sister	ARY Digital	
2011	Kountry Luv	Muniza	A-Plus TV	
2011	Tera Pyar Nahi Bhoole	Ansa	PTV	
2011	Pal Bhar Mein	Alina	PTV	
2012	Ek Tamanna Lahasil Si	Beena	Hum TV	
2012	Durr-e-Shehwar	Safia	Hum TV	
2012	Mil Ke Bhi Hum Na Mile	Nazri Beigum	Geo TV	
2012	Humsafar	Maimoona	Hum TV	
2012	Pathjar Ke Baad	Azra	A-Plus TV	
2012	Na Kaho Tum Mere Nahi	Bano Aapa	Hum TV	
2013	Heer Ranjha	Heer's mother	PTV Home	
2013	Mirat-ul-Uroos	Rafia	Geo TV	
2013	Rukhsaar	Fahida	Geo TV	
2013	Pyarey Afzal	Irsa Ibrahim	ARY Digital	
2014	Parvarish	Dil Awaiz	ARY Digital	
2014	Shehr-e-Ajnabi	Ufaq's Mother	A-Plus TV	
2014	Ishq Parast	Khadija	ARY Digital	
2014	Kitni Girhain Baaki Hain	Various (Anthology)	Hum TV	
2014	Meri Subah Ka Sitara	Sitara's mother	A-Plus TV	
2014	Dil Awaiz	Momina	PTV	
2015	Mere Khuda	Surahya	Hum TV	
2015	Karb	Sabiha	Hum TV	
2015	Tere Mere Beech	Nighat	Hum TV	
2015	Tum Mere Paas Raho	Tabish's mother	Hum TV	
2015	Nikah	Nadeem's mother	Hum TV	
2015	Guzaarish	Zain's mother	ARY Digital	
2015	Dumpukht - Aatish-e-Ishq	Khala	A-Plus TV	
2015	Sangat	Aisha's mother	Hum TV	
2016	Mera Yaar Miladay	Fahad's mother	ARY Digital	
2016	Main Kamli	Maria	Aaj Entertainment	
2016	Be Aitbaar	Uzma	Hum TV	
2016	Zara Yaad Kar	Aneesa Begum	Hum TV	
2016	Jaan'nisar	Erum	PTV Home	
2016	Ishq Nachaya	Sakina	Express TV	
2017	Mushrik	Ammi	A-Plus TV	
2017	Mohabbat Tumse Nafrat Hai	Kaneez Begum	Geo TV	
2017	Is Chand Pay Dagh Nahin	Shagufta	A-Plus TV	
2017	Dil-e-Jaanam	Qudsia	Hum TV	
2017	Iss Khamoshi Ka Matlab	Rakhshanda	Geo TV	
2017	Rani	Nafeesa	Geo TV	
2017	Titli	Naila's mother	Urdu 1	
2017	Bedardi Saiyaan	Maya	Geo TV	
2017	Baaghi	Fauzia's mother	Urdu 1	
2017	Pagli	Zakiya	Hum TV	
2017	Is Chand Pe Dagh Nahin	Mehnaz	A-Plus TV	
2017	Soteli	Iffat	ARY Digital	
2018	Ishq Tamasha	Rushna's mother	Hum TV	
2018	Pukaar	Amna	ARY Digital	
2018	Lashkara	Maryam	ARY Digital	
2018	Lamhay	Hashir's grandmother	Hum TV	
2018	Dukh Kam Na Honge	Amma	A-Plus TV	
2018	Doosra Sach	Recurring in Episode "Be Hissi"	TV One	
2018	Ishq Na Kariyo Koi	Faisal and Rehan's mother	Express TV	
2019	Khaas	Kanwal	Hum TV	
2019	Bewaja	Aliya	Bol TV	
2019	Hasad	Sadiqa	ARY Digital	
2019	Abgeenay	Amna	Geo TV	
2019	Shahrukh Ki Saliyan	Shahrukh's aunt	Geo TV	
2019	Kahin Deep Jaley	Khadija	Geo TV	
2019	Thora Sa Haq	Rabia	ARY Digital	
2019	Ishq Zaat	Alia	LTN Family	
2019	Ghalati	Nafeesa	ARY Digital	
2020	Bandhay Aik Dor Say	Razia	Geo TV	
2020	Ghisi Piti Mohabbat	Farida	ARY Digital	
2020	Bin Baadal Barsaat	Shayan's mother	Express Entertainment	
2021	Qayamat	Rashid's mother	Geo TV	
2021	Pehli Si Muhabbat	Aslam's mother	ARY Digital	
2021	Raqeeb Se	Masood's wife	Hum TV	
2021	Ishq Hai	Nafisa	ARY Digital	
2021	Baddua	Junaid's mother	ARY Digital	
2021	Dil-e-Momin	Zehra	Geo Entertainment	
2022	Yeh Na Thi Hamari Qismat	Sajida	ARY Digital	
2022	Baarwan Khiladi	Shaista	Express Entertainment	
2022	Badzaat	Laila	Geo Entertainment	
2022	Pyar Deewangi Hai	Saima	ARY Digital	
2022	Habs	Qudsia	ARY Digital	
2022	Tinkay Ka Sahara	Hammad's mother	Hum TV	
2022	Taqdeer	Fahmida	ARY Digital	
2023	Samjhota	Munazzah	ARY Digital	
2023	Chand Tara	Raazia	Hum TV	
2023	Sar-e-Rah	Anjum	ARY Digital	
2023	Mujhay Qabool Nahin	Nudrat	Geo TV	
2023	Zulm	Rakhshanda	Hum TV	
2023	Rah-e-Junoon	Mahjabeen	Hum TV	
2023	Standup Girl	Kabir's mother	Green Entertainment	
2023	Khaie	Husna Bano	Geo Entertainment	
2024	Pagal Khana	Anila	Green Entertainment	
2024	Sultanat	Sajida	Hum TV	
2024	Be Rung	Fakhra	Hum TV	
2025	Dil Wali Gali Mein	Durdana Siddiqui	Hum TV	
2025	Aas Paas	Seemab	Geo Entertainment	
2025	Mein Manto Nahin Hoon	Naseeba	ARY Digital	
2025	Tan Man Aur Tum	TBA	Green Entertainment	

=== Web Series ===
Year	Title	Role	Network
2025	Lady of the Night	Saba	Eagle Movie

=== Telefilm ===
Year	Title	Role	Network
2021	Tameez Uddin Ki Badtameez Family	Saima	ARY Digital

=== Film ===
Year	Title	Role	Notes
2018	Rangreza	Aapa	
2019	Kaaf Kangna	Begum	
2021	Bhoot Bangla	Amma	Horror film
2022	Ruposh	Zunaira's mother	Telefilm
2022	Love Life Ka Law	Maya's mother	Telefilm
2022	London Nahi Jaunga	Chaudrani	

== Awards and nominations ==
Year	Award	Category	Result	Title	Ref.
1998	PTV Award	Best Newscaster	Won	Khabarnama	
2011	11th Lux Style Awards	Best Actress	Nominated	Pal Bhar Mein	
2017	5th Hum Awards	Best Supporting Actress	Nominated	Zara Yaad Kar	
