= Na Kaho Tum Mere Nahi =

Pakistani TV series

- Promotional DVD Poster
- Genre: Romance; Drama
- Written by: Maha Malik
- Directed by: Amna Nawaz Khan
- Starring: Ahsan Khan; Saba Qamar; Rabab Hashim; Saifee Hassan; Kausar Siddique; Javed Sheikh; Saba Faisal; Arisha Razi; Zuhab Khan
- Country of origin: Pakistan
- Original language: Urdu

Production
- Producer: Momina Duraid

Original release
- Network: Hum TV
- Release: 22 October 2012 – 4 March 2013

Na Kaho Tum Mere Nahi (Urdu: نہ کہو تم میرے نہیں, romanized: Don't Say You Aren't Mine) is a 2012 Pakistani romantic drama serial broadcast by Hum TV. The serial was first aired on 22 October 2012. It aired every Monday on Hum TV until 4 March 2013. It is written by Maha Malik and directed by Amna Nawaz Khan, starring Ahsan Khan, Saba Qamar and Rubab Hashim.

== Plot ==
Na Kaho Tum Mere Nahi is a tale of a married couple Meerab and Mehreen. It shows how their life suffers due to Meerab's elder sister Bano apa. She always asks for money from her brother for running her family. In this way, she annoys Mehreen because Mehreen wants to give a better education and facilities to her children Meeran and Humaima. But, Meerab also spends money on his sister Bano apa. Bano apa's husband never worries about his children and never tries to earn money for his family. Later, Meerab and Mehreen's university friend Maya (Rubab Hashim) enters their life and the situation becomes more complicated. She proposed to Meerab during university days but he rejected her proposal as he liked Mehreen. After many years, Maya comes back in their life.
Maya is married to Arsalan, whom she only married for his reputation and money. Their marriage is an agreement. She becomes friends with Mehreen to enter her life and also gives a high profile job to Meerab in her company. She then, asks Arsalan to give divorce to her. Since, he does not believe in forcing a woman, so he agrees to give her a divorce. Maya tries to take sympathies of Meerab and says him that Arslan was the one who wanted their separation. Mehreen starts becoming aware of Maya's intentions and stops working for her and starts working for Arslan. Mehreen knows that it was Maya who asked Arsalan to give divorce to her.
Mehreen tries to make Meerab understand that Maya's intentions are not right but Meerab thinks that Maya is innocent. As Meerab works for Maya, she gives him house and company car and becomes friend with him. Meerab does not want Mehreen to work in Arslan's company and asks her to work for Maya again, but she denies. Maya, then proposes Meerab but he says that he cannot marry her. Mehreen is shocked when she heard about Maya's proposal. Mehreen plans to stop working at Arsalan's office but has to work for her children's needs. Fights and misunderstandings in the couple due to Maya reached to an extent that Mehreen leaves home with children and starts living in their old house.

Meerab takes his children along with him and says Mehreen to come with him but she says that she will only come back if he leaves the job at Maya's company. But he does not agree . Few days later, when Meerab believes untrue statements by Maya, he plans to marry her. In the meantime, Mehreen plans to take custody of her children. She also has to help Arslan in court so that he can take his property back from Maya. He says Mehreen to give a false statement in court that Meerab and Maya had a pre-planning of grasping his property before Arslan and Maya's marriage. Mehreen could not give this false statement in the court against Meerab as she could not lie after holding the Qur'an and also she cares for her husband's respect.

Maya and Meerab win the case. Arslan asks Mehreen to marry him. She agrees as she sees Meerab on the spot. Later, when Mehreen gets Maya and Meerab's marriage card, she asks Meerab for divorce. Meerab is shocked to hear about the card because he wanted his second marriage to be simple. On the other hand, Bano apa's son kills a person by mistake and kidnaps Meerab's son for ransom so that he can give that money to the victim's relatives. Mehreen and Meerab are tensed and Maya helps to find the kidnapper. Bano apa's son is jailed. Meerab discovers that Maya forced his previous company's boss to expel Meerab from job and then herself makes him the managing director of her company.

On the day of Meerab and Maya's marriage, Bano apa's husband is killed by the relatives of the person who was killed by Bano apa's son. Listening the news of his death, Meerab goes to Bano apa and did not marry Maya. Bano apa apologizes from Mehreen as she does not like Mehreen and used to take rights of Mehreen and her children. She forgives her. Bano apa also asks for forgiveness form Meerab and makes him understand that Mehreen is a nice woman and he should not leave her. Mehreen denies Arsalan's offer also because she does not want to bring a step-father for her children. Meerab feels that Maya made a conspiracy and goes to Arsalan to know about the background. He then goes to Maya and realises her intentions as she wanted to marry him from a long time and made a conspiracy against Mehreen and him. He does not marry her and leaves her job, he returns to Mehreen and asks for her apology. Maya goes to her office in tension of her defeat and dies due to nervous breakdown. Later, Meerab and Mehreen are shown living their old happy life with their children.

== Cast ==
- Ahsan Khan as Meerab
- Saba Qamar as Mehreen
- Rubab Hashim as Maya
- Javed Sheikh as Arsalan
- Arisha Razi as Humaima
- Zuhab Khan as Meeran
- Saife Hassan
- Kausar Siddiqui
- Saba Faisal as Bano apa

== Broadcast and release ==
Na Kaho Tum Mere Nahi was originally broadcast on Hum TV from 2012-13. The series was aired in India on Zindagi in 2016.

Since mid 2020, the show was also released on Indian OTT platform ZEE5 to stream online.

== Critical reception ==
Sidrah Moiz of The Express Tribune critiques the series for its clichéd and misogynistic storyline, blaming the wife for the husband's infidelity and perpetuating negative stereotypes about women.
