= Mirza Ki Heer =

2026 Pakistani television series

- Genre: Romance
- Written by: Zeeshan Junaid
- Directed by: Aehsun Talish
- Starring: Ali Raza; Hina Afridi; Zahid Ahmed
- Country of origin: Pakistan
- Original language: Urdu
- No. of episodes: 41

Production
- Producer: Abdullah Seja
- Production company: iDream Entertainment

Original release
- Network: ARY Digital
- Release: 2 April – 10 September 2026

Mirza Ki Heer is a Pakistani television drama series directed by Aehsun Talish and written by Zeeshan Junaid. Produced by iDream Entertainment, the series features Ali Raza, Hina Afridi and Zahid Ahmed in leading roles. It premiered on ARY Digital in April 2026.

== Plot ==
The series centres on Heer and Taimoor Mirza, whose relationship develops amid family circumstances and personal conflicts. Their relationship is challenged by Dilnawaz, whose involvement creates further complications in their lives.

== Cast ==
- Ali Raza as Taimoor Mirza
- Hina Afridi as Heer
- Zahid Ahmed as Dilnawaz
- Ali Safina
- Zainab Qayoom
- Nayyar Ejaz
- Mahnoor Parvaiz
- Ismat Zaidi
- Asma Abbas
- Munazzah Arif
- Ali Tahir

== Production ==
The series was produced by iDream Entertainment and directed by Aehsun Talish. It marked a romantic-drama project for the production team, which had previously worked on television serials in other genres. The production's setting and visual design were discussed in a behind-the-scenes report published by Dawn Images in April 2026.

== Broadcast ==
Mirza Ki Heer premiered on ARY Digital on 2 April 2026. Its final episode aired on 10 September 2026.
