= Bedardi Saiyaan =

Pakistani television drama serial (2017–2018)

- Title screen
- Genre: Family drama
- Written by: Jahanzaib Qamar
- Directed by: Mohsin Mirza
- Starring: Agha Ali; Sanam Chaudhry; Ghana Ali
- Country of origin: Pakistan
- Original language: Urdu
- No. of episodes: 31

Production
- Producer: SBCH Productions
- Production location: Pakistan
- Running time: approx. 40 minutes

Original release
- Network: Geo Entertainment
- Release: 25 October 2017 – 30 January 2018

Bedardi Saiyaan (Urdu: بے دردی سیاں, lit. 'Heartless Beloved') is a Pakistani Urdu-language television drama serial that aired on Geo Entertainment from 25 October 2017 to 30 January 2018, comprising 31 episodes. It was directed by Mohsin Mirza from a script by Jahanzaib Qamar, and stars Agha Ali, Sanam Chaudhry and Ghana Ali in the principal roles.

== Plot ==
The serial follows Saleha, a widow left in financial precarity after her husband's death, who moves with her son and daughter into the household of her brother and his wife. The narrative centres on the family's daughter, Hania, who marries Shani, a man who pursues the marriage in order to gain control of her inheritance and business interests, and her efforts to extricate herself from the relationship after his motives become apparent.

== Cast ==
- Sanam Chaudhry as Hania
- Agha Ali as Shani
- Ghana Ali as Baila, Hania's cousin
- Mirza Zain Baig as Javeed, Hania's brother
- Shehryar Zaidi as Ajmal, Hania's uncle
- Seemi Pasha as Nuzhat, Ajmal's wife
- Shaista Jabeen as Saleha, Hania's mother
- Anmol Baloch as Tara, Shani's sister
- Javeria Abbasi as Rafia, Shani's sister
- Jinaan Hussain as Mariam, Shani's friend
- Saba Faisal as Rakhshanda, Shani's mother
- Saife Hassan
- Fahad Rehmani
