= Pagli (TV series) =

Pakistani television series

- پگلی
- Based on: Pagli by Shaukat Thanvi
- Written by: Khurram Abbas
- Directed by: Ali Masud Saeed
- Starring: Hira Mani; Noor Hassan Rizvi; Hina Altaf; Asim Azhar
- Opening theme: Yeh Pagli Ishq Jaanay Naa by Asim Azhar and Aima Baig
- Country of origin: Pakistan
- Original language: Urdu
- No. of seasons: 1
- No. of episodes: 22

Production
- Camera setup: Multi-camera setup

Original release
- Network: Hum TV
- Release: 28 August 2017 – 22 January 2018

Related
- Yeh Raha Dil; Mah-e-Tamaam

Pagli (lit. Mad Girl), is a Pakistani romantic drama serial that first aired on 28 August 2017 on Hum TV. It stars Noor Hassan Rizvi, Hina Altaf, Asim Azhar, and Hira Salman in lead roles.

It is based on the novel of the same name by Shaukat Thanvi, written by Khurram Abbas and directed by Ali Masud Saeed.

It was dubbed in Pashto under the title لیونئ and aired on Hum Pashto 1.

== Story ==
Dr. Khalid (Noor Hassan Rizvi) is a psychiatrist who has just completed his degree from America and is returning to Pakistan to be with his family and establish a clinic there. When he reaches Pakistan, he decides to travel to his city by train instead of by plane so that he can see his country properly, for he has been away for so long. In the train, he comes across a bubbly, upbeat and cheerful girl called Gulrukh (Hira Salman) who keeps Dr. Khalid entertained with her witty jokes. She tells him that his clinic is not going to give him good business since, in Pakistan, no one wants to be called a psychic by going to a psychiatric clinic for help. Khalid tells her that he is engaged to his cousin Zubia. Much to Khalid's surprise, Gulrukh guesses a lot about Zubia, such as the fact that she must be a quiet girl who has not studied after her intermediate. Gulrukh tells him that Zubia is not the girl Khalid should marry and he should instead marry someone like herself (Gulrukh). This entertains Khalid. Gulrukh insists that Khalid should take her to his home so that she can show him why she is the perfect match for him, and after a little reluctance, Khalid agrees. They reach Khalid's home and Khalid is greeted warmly by the family members. However, Zubia and her mother are uncomfortable with Gulrukh's presence, though Khalid's mother welcomes her as Khalid's guest. Gulrukh remarks that Zubia is exactly like she imagined her. Meanwhile, an old man (Mehmood Aslam) and a boy (Asim Azhar) are seen seated in a police station. The old man is reporting that his daughter has disappeared and he blames the boy for his daughter's disappearance. This is depicted in a comic way instead of showing it as a serious scene. The boy denies having been involved in the disappearance of the girl. The girl's father gives her picture to the police and the girl turns out to be Gulrukh. Days pass and Zubia gets uncomfortable due to Gulrukh's closeness with Khalid. Gulrukh, after earning Khalid's love, realizes that she has made an enormous mistake by snatching away the innocent Zubia's love from her and in order to correct the situation she wants to leave the house but now Khalid loves her a lot and wants to marry her only. Gulrukh runs away from home when her father and "fiancé," Najam come to take her back to Lahore. Zubi, being a kind hearted and understanding girl, does not want Gulrukh to go as she wants Khalid to be with the girl he loves. Gulrukh is found and it is revealed that she has forgotten both her father and Najam. Khalid wants to give psychological help to Gulrukh. Meanwhile, love starts blossoming between Zubi and Najam when Gulrukh refuses to marry him. Khalid's sister Shehzeen visits and wants Gulrukh, her father, and Najam to leave, because she wants Khalid and Zubi to get married. The End

== Cast ==
- Noor Hassan Rizvi as Dr. Khalid
- Hira Mani as Gulrukh
- Mehmood Aslam as Hakeem Karamat Ali
- Sajida Syed as Dr. Khalid & Shehzeen's mother
- Hina Altaf as Zubaida "Zubi"
- Saba Faisal as Zakkiya
- Asim Azhar as Najam
- Mahjabeen Habib as Shehzeen
- Lubna Aslam as Gulrukh's mother
- Malik Raza as Munshee
- Faisal Naqvi as Hospital Doctor
- Faheem Tijani as Servant
- Faiza Ali as Hira
