= Hina Altaf =

Pakistani actress

- حنا الطاف خان
- Born: Hina Altaf Khan; 2 January 1992 (age 34); Karachi, Sindh, Pakistan
- Education: Iqra University
- Occupation: Actress
- Years active: 2012–present
- Spouse: Agha Ali (m. 2020; div. 2024)

Hina Altaf (Urdu: حنا الطاف خان; born 2 January 1992), is a Pakistani television actress, presenter and former video jockey. Altaf briefly hosted ARY Musik's teen show Girl's Republic. She is best known for her role as Zebo in Udaari, Eshal in Dil-e-Jaanam, Asma in Aatish, Zara in Dil-e-Gumshuda and Zoya in Rabba Mainu Maaf Kareen.

== Personal life ==
Hina Altaf was born on 2 January 1992 in the metropolitan city of Karachi.

On 22 May 2020, Altaf married Agha Ali with whom she has worked in Dil-e-Gumshuda (2019). and they divorced in 2024.

== Career ==
Altaf made her television debut as a VJ. She briefly host teen show Girls Republic on MTV Pakistan. She made her acting debut with a supporting role in the ARY Digital's melodrama Maryam Kese Jiye in 2015.

She subsequently starred as the titular character in the 2015 romance Ek Thi Misaal, and gained wider recognition for playing a rape victim in the highly successful social drama Udaari (2016), which ranks among the highest-rated Urdu dramas of all time. Altaf has since played leading roles in several television series, including the romantic series Dil-e-Jaanam (2017), Gumrah (2017), Pagli (2017), Aatish (2018) and Dil-e-Gumshuda (2019).

Altaf briefly appeared in one episode of Angeline Malik's directorial anthology series Ustani Jee on Hum TV. She was also seen as a simple housewife in Rabba Mainu Maaf Kareen opposite Hammad Farooqui (2020) and as Husna in Geo Entertainment's Dikhawa (2020). Altaf co-hosted the fourth season of the musical show Battle of the Bands along with actor Ali Safina in 2019. She started her own YouTube channel in 2019, where she regularly uploads vlogs and behind the scene videos of her project shoots. In 2019, Altaf was named in the list of Sexiest Asian Woman by Eastern Eye.

== Television ==
Year	Title	Role	Director	Notes	Ref(s)
2013	Meri Teri Kahani	Hina	Hassan Saquib	Special appearance	
2013	Matam	Zaibi	Rashid Sami	ARY Digital	
2015	Maryam Kasay Jeeye	Maryam	Syed Atif Hussain		
2015	Judaai	Amariya	Syed Ramish Rizvi		
2015	Madventures (season 2)	Contestant	Khurram Farid		
2015	Madawa	Samreen	Naeem Khan	Hum Sitaray	
2016	Ek Thi Misaal	Misaal	Shaquille Khan		
2016	Karb	Eman	Amna Nawaz Khan		
2016	Abro	Afsheen	Ilyas Kashmiri		
2016	Udaari	Zeb-un-Nisa Pervaiz (Zebo)	Mohammed Ehteshamuddin		
2016	Natak	Sabeen	Ali Masud Saeed	Hum TV	
2016	Saya-e-Dewar Bhi Nahi	Aainoor	Shahzad Kashmiri		
2017	Kuch Na Kaho	Rania	Ilyas Kashmiri	Hum TV	
2017	Bubu Ki Beti	Fairy	Yasra Rizvi	A plus	
2017	Dil-e-Jaanam	Eshal	Fahim Burney		
2017	Gumrah	Huma	Saima Waseem		
2017	Pagli	Zubaida	Ali Masud Saeed		
2017	Sodai	Fariya	Imran Baig		
2018	Karamat-e-Ishq	Sania	Naeem Khan		
2018	Tawaan	Mahnoor	Syed Wahb Jafri		
2018	Aatish	Asma	Saima Waseem		
2019	Dil-e-Gumshuda	Zara	Shaqielle Khan	Geo Tv	
2020	Rabba Mainu Maaf Kareen	Zoya	Kashif Zaman		
2020	Bandhay Aik Dor Say	Roshni	Ali Faizan		
2020	Kasa-e-Dil	Somia	Zeeshan Ahmed		
2021	Dour	Asma	Mazhar Moin	Geo Tv	
2022	Dil Zaar Zaar	Tayyaba	Saima Waseem		
2022	Agar	Hooriya	Ilyas Kashmiri	Hum TV	
2023	Hostel	Maha Shafqat	Muhammad Ifftikhar Iffi	Aan TV	
2023	Nijaat	Faryal	Amin Iqbal	Hum TV	
2024	Mere Ranjana	Simra	Aamir Sohail	Green Entertainment	
2024	Mehroom	Zaira	Mazhar Moin	Geo Entertainment	
2025	Kaarzar-e-Dua	Tanno	Ali Faizan	Geo Entertainment	
2025	Naqsh		Aabis Raza	Green Entertainment	
2026	Ay Dushman-e-Jaan		M. Tahseen Khan	Express Entertainment	

=== Anthology Series ===
Year	Title	Role	Network	Notes
2018	Ustani Jee	Sidra	Hum TV	Episode 10
2020	Dikhawa	Maira / Ayesha / Rushna / Saba	Geo Entertainment	Episode "Pardah", "Fake Honor", "Pehchan" and "Karaye Ki Izzat"
2020	Makafaat 2	Shehla	Geo Entertainment	Episode "Behkawa"
2020	Aik Aur Munafiq	Mahpara	Geo Entertainment	Episode "Jhatka"
2022	Sirat-e-Mustaqeem	Sara	Ary Digital	Episode "Nashukri"
2022	Nisa	Faryal	Geo Entertainment	Episode "Sulah"
2022	Aitraaf	Raima	Aan TV	Episode 2 "Khoat"
2023	Mein Kahani Hun	Warda	Express Entertainment	Episode 45 "Malaal"

=== Telefilm ===
Year	Title	Role	Network	Notes
2017	Eid Loadshedding Mubarak	Shano	TV One Pakistan	Telefilm
2017	Zamani Manzil Kay Maskharay	Chandni	Geo Entertainment	Telefilm
2019	Judai	Zara	Urdu 1	Telefilm
2019	Bahu Rani Saas Sayani	Aini	Hum TV	Telefilm
2020	Love Siyapaa	Dua	Geo Entertainment	Telefilm
2020	Teray Pyar Mai	Haseena	Geo Entertainment	Telefilm
2021	Phupho Ki Shaadi	Maha	Play Entertainment	Telefilm
2021	Filmy Siyappa	Maya	Geo Entertainment	Telefilm
2021	Romantic Razia	Razia	Geo Entertainment	Telefilm
2021	Shaadi Hai Impossible	Zaifi	Ary Digital	Telefilm
2021	Akkar Bakkar	Mahi	Hum TV	Telefilm
2021	Mera Pehla Pyar	Natasha	Hum TV	Telefilm
2021	Mohabbat 5kg	Komal	Express Entertainment	Telefilm
2022	Pyare Ko Pyar Nahi Mila	Sonia	Hum TV	Telefilm
2022	Aunty Allergy	Zoya	Ary Digital	Telefilm
2022	Tara Ka Sajan	Tara	Play Entertainment	Telefilm
2022	Thori Sazish Thori Mudakhlat	Ayeza	Hum TV	Telefilm
2023	Mareez-e-Mohabbat	Nida	Aan TV	Telefilm
2023	Jimmy Ki Aaye Gi Baraat	Chandni	ARY Digital	Telefilm

=== Web series ===
Year	Title	Role	Network	Notes
2021	Raat		UrduFlix	Along with Aagha Ali.

=== Hosting ===
Year	Title	Role	Network
2012	Girls Republic	Host	MTV Pakistan
2015-2016	Breaking Weekend	Host	ARY Zindagi
2016-2017	The Morning Show	Host	ARY News
2019	Battle of the Bands (season 4)	Host	Various
2021-2022	The Couple Show	Hosted with Aagha Ali	Aaj Entertainment
2022	Baran-E-Rehmat	Hosted with Ali Haider	Aaj Entertainment
2022	Khushiyoun Bhari Eid	Hosted with Ali Haider	Aaj Entertainment
2023	Girls Only	Host	GirlsOnly
2023	Footprints Podcast	Host	Shadow Productions

== Awards and nominations ==
Year	Work	Award	Result	Refs
PISA 2020
2020	Aatish	Best Television Actress	Nominated	
2nd Pakistan International Screen Awards
2021	Bandhay Aik Dor Say	Best Supporting Actress	Won	
