= Kubra Khan =

Pakistani born British actress (born 1993)

- Born: Rabia Iqbal Khan; Kabirwala, Punjab, Pakistan
- Citizenship: Pakistani; British
- Occupation: Actress
- Years active: 2014–present
- Height: 1.71 m (5 ft 7 in)
- Spouse: Gohar Rasheed (m. 2025)
- Relatives: Fatima Khan (Sister) Ahmad Ali Butt (Brother-in-law)

Rabia Iqbal Khan (Urdu: رابعہ اقبال خان) known by her stage name Kubra Khan (Urdu: کبریٰ خان; born 16 June 1993), is a Pakistani actress who works in Urdu television and films. She made her debut in 2014 with the film Na Maloom Afraad. Khan is described among the nation's highest-paid actresses by the media.

Khan has appeared in successful films such as Jawani Phir Nahi Ani 2, Parwaaz Hai Junoon (both 2018), and London Nahi Jaunga (2022). She made her television debut with Sang-e-Mar Mar (2016) followed by several dramas including Alif Allah Aur Insaan (2017), Alif (2019), Hum Kahan Ke Sachay Thay and Sinf-e-Aahan (both in 2021), Jannat Se Aagay (2023) and Noor Jahan (2024).

== Early life ==
Born near Multan, Punjab, her family moved to the United Kingdom when she was 6 months old, and initially was a model, having been spotted by Ahmed Ali Butt's future wife Fatima Khan and later by Butt's brother, before becoming an actress.

== Career ==
Khan's acting debut as well as cinematic debut was marked in 2013 by action-comedy Na Maloom Afraad, where she portrayed Hina, a bank-worker and love interest of the film's main lead, Mohsin Abbas Haider. A reviewer from the Gulf Times found her presence as "almost angel-like" but criticised her unfit and preachy monologue. In 2015, Khan appeared in the Bollywood movie Welcome 2 Karachi.

She made her television debut in Sang-e-Mar Mar, which aired on Hum TV in 2016. Sadaf Haider of the DAWN Images termed her as one of the breakout star of the serial, noting her "beautifully controlled performance as Shireen". She next appeared in the spiritual-romance Khuda Aur Muhabbat season 2 as a materialistic girl who later develops spiritualism. Khan then essayed the justice seeking marital rape victim in the drama Andaaz-e-Sitam. She concluded the year with a similar role of a rape victim in social drama Muqabil, for which she received Lux Style Award for Best TV Actress nomination at the 17th Lux Style Awards.

She had her first appearance in 2017 in spiritual drama Alif Allah Aur Insaan as an arrogant and pride daughter of a feudal family. She expressed dissatisfaction with her performance. She then played a girl next door in romantic-comedy Shadi Mubarak Ho. Her next portrayal was a brief appearance as a ballsy London-based punjabi window in social drama Daldal.

In 2018, she appeared in the Pakistani films Jawani Phir Nahi Ani 2 and Parwaaz Hai Junoon, both of which released on 22 August Eid-al-Adha. While reviewing her performance in Jawani Phir Nahi Ani 2, Mohammad Kamran Jawaid of Dawn opined that her "cutesy aura befitting her role".

She returned to television in 2019 with spiritual-romance Alif, portraying Husn-e-Jahan, a renowned Pakistani cinema actress who abandoned her career to marry a calligrapher's son. Describing the project as "most memorable" for her, Khan reflected that she gave "heart and soul to Alif."

In 2022, she portrayed Mashal Tahir, an emotionally fragile and insecure university student in psychological-drama Hum Kahan Ke Sachay Thay based on the eponymous novel by Umera Ahmad. Maria Kari of the DAWN Images found that as Mashal, Khan "packs a punch". Khan then depicted a journalist with her childhood trauma in mystery-drama Sang-e-Mah, pairing opposite Atif Aslam. Her on-screen chemistry with Aslam was praised critically, despite her performance being overlooked. The same year, she returned to cinema screens, starring alongside Humayun Saeed in romantic-comedy London Nahi Jaunga as an educated rural Punjabi girl. Rafay Mahmood of The Express Tribune found her as a "a real surprise package" who "ruled the screen and camera, equally". The performance earned her a nomination of Best Film Actress at the 22nd Lux Style Awards

In 2023, Khan starred as Jannat Ali Khan in ontology drama Jannat Se Aagay as a TV show host whose personal life gets affected due to her stardom, earning decent reviews; Gaitee Ara Siddiqi of The News International stated that she has done "a commendable job" suggesting improvement in dialogue delivery. In 2024, she appeared in television series Noor Jahan as Noor Bano Shah.

She will next seen as Homai Vyarawalla in Aur Digital's drama Fatima Jinnah.

== Controversy ==
In 2023, reports emerged alleging that the Pakistan Army, under the direction of former COAS Qamar Javed Bajwa and former DG Inter-Services Intelligence (ISI) Faiz Hameed, employed actresses to entrap and blackmail politicians in the country. These claims were made by retired Major Adil Raja, who suggested that actresses were used to produce compromising videos and were housed in safe houses connected to the ISI. One of the actresses named in the allegations was Kubra Khan who denied these claims, describing them as unfounded.

In response to the allegations, Khan also threatened legal action against Adil Raja for defamation. Raja subsequently issued an apology to Khan, clarifying that his intention was not to target women but to highlight broader systemic issues.

== Personal life ==
In January 2025, Khan and her longtime friend Gohar Rasheed announced their upcoming wedding.

== Filmography ==
=== Films ===
Key
†	Denotes films that have not yet been released

Year	Title	Role	Director	Notes	Ref(s)
2014	Na Maloom Afraad	Hina	Nabeel Qureshi	Debut	
2014	The Conversations	Perfect girl	Haider Zafar	British short film	
2015	Welcome 2 Karachi	ISI agent Asma	Ashish R Mohan	Hindi film	
2018	Jawani Phir Nahi Ani 2	Celina	Nadeem Baig		
2018	Parwaaz Hai Junoon	Fiza Nadir Kirmani	Haseeb Hassan		
2019	Superstar	Herself	Mohammed Ehteshamuddin	Special appearance in the song "Dhadak Bhadak"	
2022	London Nahi Jaunga	Arzoo Mansoor Tiwana	Nadeem Baig		
2024	Abhi	Zara	Asad Mumtaz Malik		

=== Television ===
Year	Title	Role	Network	Director	Notes	Ref(s)
2016	Sang-e-Mar Mar	Shireen	Hum TV	Saife Hassan	Television Debut	
2016	Muqabil	Parisa	ARY Digital	Ali Hassan		
2016	Khuda Aur Muhabbat 2	Sarah Isaac	Geo Entertainment	Babar Javed		
2017	Andaaz-e-Sitam	Aayat	Urdu 1	Ali Hassan		
2017	Shaadi Mubarak Ho	Zoya	ARY Digital	Wajahat Rauf		
2017	Alif Allah Aur Insaan	Nazneen Malik	Hum TV	Aehsun Talish		
2017	Daldal	Preet Kaur	Hum TV	Siraj-ul-Haque	Extended Cameo	
2019	Alif	Husn e Jahan	Geo Entertainment	Haseeb Hassan		
2019	Choti Choti Batain	Sana	Hum TV	Angeline Malik	Anthology Series - Episode: Kuch To Log Kahengay	
2021	Hum Kahan Ke Sachay Thay	Mashal Tahir	Hum TV	Farooq Rind	Negative Lead	
2021	Sinf-e-Aahan	Mahjabeen Mastan	ARY Digital	Nadeem Baig		
2022	Sang-e-Mah	Sheherzaad	Hum TV	Saife Hassan		
2023	Jannat Se Aagay	Jannat Ali Khan	Geo Entertainment	Haseeb Hassan		
2024	Noor Jahan	Noor Bano Shah	ARY Digital	Musaddiq Malek		
2025	Meri Tanhai	Maryam Ali Murad (aka Mary)	Hum TV	Meer Sikandar		
2026	Doctor Bahu	Dr. Sania	ARY Digital	Mehreen Jabbar		
TBA	Fatima Jinnah †	Homai Vyarawalla	Aur Digital	Danyal K Afzal	Unreleased	

=== Telefilms ===
Year	Title	Role	Network	Director	Notes	Ref(s)
2019	Laal	Samira	Geo Entertainment	Haseeb Hassan	Released on the occasion of Pakistan Day	
2019	Raja Ki Chandni	Chandni	Hum TV	Kamran Akbar Khan		
2021	Bholay Bhalay Saiyan	Kashmala	Hum TV	Angeline Malik		
2021	Absolutely Knot	Hania	ARY Digital	Musaddiq Malek		
2022	Afrah Tafreeh	Khushi	Hum TV	Awais Sulaman		
2026	Untitled Telefilm with Aagha Ali †	TBA	Hum TV	Ali Hassan		

=== Other appearances ===
Year	Title	Role	Network	Notes	Ref(s)
2026	Jeeto Pakistan League - Season 7	Herself - Captain of team Islamabad Dragons	ARY Digital	Runner-up team	
2026	Mehfil-e-Ramzan	Herself	Green Entertainment		
2026	Hasna Mana Hai	Herself	Geo Entertainment	Eid Special Show	

== Awards and nominations ==
Year	Award	Category	Work	Result	Ref(s)
2017	5th Hum Awards	Best New Sensation - Female	Sang-e-Mar Mar	Won	
2017	5th Hum Awards	Best On-screen Couple - Jury (with Mikaal Zulfiqar)	Sang-e-Mar Mar	Nominated	
2017	5th Hum Awards	Best On-screen Couple - Popular (with Mikaal Zulfiqar)	Sang-e-Mar Mar	Nominated	
2017	1st International Pakistan Prestige Awards	Best Actress (Television)	Sang-e-Mar Mar	Nominated	
2017	ARY Viewer's Choice Awards	Best Newcomer Female	Muqabil	Won	
2018	17th Lux Style Awards	Best Television Actress	Muqabil	Nominated	
2018	2nd Pakistan Excellence Award	Best Supporting Actor Female	Khuda Aur Muhabbat 2	Won	
2018	6th Hum Awards	Best Actor Female - Jury	Alif Allah Aur Insaan	Nominated	
2018	6th Hum Awards	Best Actor Female - Popular	Alif Allah Aur Insaan	Nominated	
2018	6th Hum Awards	Best On-screen Couple - Jury (with Shehzad Sheikh)	Alif Allah Aur Insaan	Nominated	
2018	6th Hum Awards	Best On-screen Couple - Popular (with Shehzad Sheikh)	Alif Allah Aur Insaan	Nominated	
2018	2nd International Pakistan Prestige Awards	Best TV Actress	Alif Allah Aur Insaan	Nominated	
2019	3rd International Pakistan Prestige Awards	Best Actor Female Film Jury	Jawani Phir Nahi Ani 2	Won	
2021	4th International Pakistan Prestige Awards	Best Actor Supporting Role TV Serial	Alif	Nominated	
2022	Asim Jofa Fashion Awards	Star of the Best Campaign of the Year	—N/a	Won	
2022	8th Hum Awards	Best Performance in a Negative Role	Hum Kahan Ke Sachay Thay	Nominated	
2022	21st Lux Style Awards	Best TV Actress (Critics' Choice)	Hum Kahan Ke Sachay Thay	Nominated	
2023	22nd Lux Style Awards	Best Film Actress	London Nahi Jaunga	Nominated	
2023	5th International Pakistan Prestige Awards	Best Actor (Female) TV Serial	Sang-e-Mah	Nominated	
2023	5th International Pakistan Prestige Awards	Best On-Screen Couple TV Serial (with Atif Aslam)	Sang-e-Mah	Nominated	
2024	9th Hum Awards	Best Actress	Sang-e-Mah	Nominated	
2024	9th Hum Awards	Best On-screen Couple (with Atif Aslam)	Sang-e-Mah	Nominated	
2025	2nd Kya Drama Hai Icon Awards	Best Supporting Actress (Popular Choice)	Noor Jahan	Nominated	
2025	24th Lux Style Awards	Film Actor of the Year - Female	Abhi	Nominated	
