= Marzi (serial) =

2016 Pakistani drama serial

- Title screen
- Genre: Family drama Romantic drama
- Written by: Ali Moeen
- Directed by: Syed Wajahat Hussain
- Starring: Rabab Hashim; Junaid Khan; Jana Malik
- Country of origin: Pakistan
- Original language: Urdu
- No. of episodes: 24

Production
- Producers: Babar Javed; Asif Raza Mir
- Camera setup: Multi-camera setup
- Production company: A&B Entertainment

Original release
- Network: Geo Entertainment
- Release: 14 July – 15 December 2016

Marzi is a Pakistani drama serial first aired on Geo Entertainment on 14 July 2016. It was produced by Babar Javed and written by Ali Moeen. Rabab Hashim and Junaid Khan played the leading roles in the serial.

== Synopsis ==
Marzi revolves around a young girl, Manaal (Rabab Hashim), as she struggles with her unrequited love for Zain (Junaid Khan). Belonging to a middle class family, Manaal and her mother are dependent on her sister Afeera (Jana Malik) who is married to Irfan (Babar Ali), an influential businessman. Irfan’s dominating and demeaning behaviour, makes him the sole patriarch of his family. Zain is a radio jockey and a singer in Irfan’s FM company. After a couple of meetings, Manaal falls in love with Zain while Zain remains sceptical about his feelings. Upon knowing about Manaal’s family background, Zain steps back as he fears getting involved with Irfan’s family. Irfan's vicious planning against Zain and Manaal makes him file a false case against Zain on the charge of kidnapping Manaal. Manaal being reckless and rebellious at heart asks Zain to fight for themselves.

Will Zain ever be able to stand for his love or will he succumb to Irfan’s will?

== Cast ==
- Rabab Hashim as Manaal
- Jana Malik as Afeera
- Babar Ali as Irfan
- Junaid Khan as Zain
- Seemi Raheel
- Najia Baig
- Khalid Saleem Butt
- Munazzah Arif as Manaal's aunt
- Abdullah Ejaz
- Ali Sikandar

== Soundtrack ==
The original soundtrack of Marzi is sung by Junaid Khan, the lead actor of this drama serial. The song is available on Patari.
