= Ali Moeen =

Pakistani writer

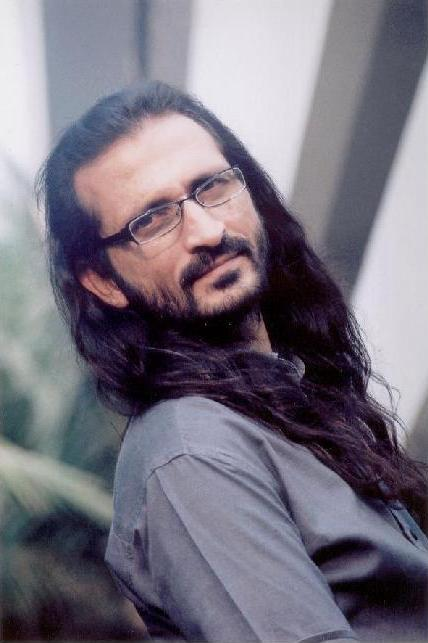
- Born: 20 November 1968 (age 57); Lahore
- Education: Masters in English & Political Science
- Occupations: Playwright, screenwriter, lyricist, media consultant, product developer for media

Ali Moeen (born 20 November 1968) is a Pakistani playwright and lyricist.

== Early life and career ==
Ali Moeen was born on 20 November 1968 in Lahore. He completed his Master's degree in English literature and political science from Government College University, Lahore.

On 2 December 2008, Ali Moeen was awarded the Best Drama Writer in the Hum TV's HUM Tele Film Festival 2008 for the telefilm Aik Aadh Hafta.

=== "Yeh Hum Naheen" (Urdu ﻳﻪ ﮨﻢ ﻧﹷﮭﹻﮟ,) – "This Is Not Us!" ===
The lyrics, penned by Ali Moeen, are succinct but clear: "This story that is being spread in our names is a lie. These stamps of death on our foreheads are the signs of others. The name by which you know us, we are not that. The eyes with which you look at us, we are not that. This is not us, this is not us." Composed by Shuja Haider, the result is a mega hit single. "Yeh Hum Naheen" not only topped MTV Asia and Pakistani charts, but also made its presence felt on the British charts.

— "The Dawn Review", Dawn Newspaper, 16 October 2008

Ali Moeen wrote the lyrics for "Yeh Hum Naheen", a peace song sung by Pakistan's leading artists as part of an international campaign against terrorism. The song and message behind it have been covered by international media. The campaign was the brainchild of Waseem Mahmood, author and media consultant, who took inspiration for the project from his children, who were tired of the way a minority of misguided young people were putting forward a message of radicalisation and terrorism which was at odds with what the majority of Muslims believe. The central message of the song is that of reconciliation, peace and truth, and is intended as the voice of the silent majority of Pakistanis who are saddened and shocked at the high-jacking of Islam by terrorists, and want to stand up and shout "This is Not Us". Ali Moeen wrote the song in words that are simple and meant to reach a wide-ranging audience. The music was composed by Shuja Haider. "Yeh Hum Naheen" not only topped MTV Asia and Pakistani charts but also made its presence felt on the British charts.

== Books ==
- Badan Ki Khanqah Se (Urdu Poetry) (1991)
- Bhagwa Bhes (Urdu/Personality Sketches)
- Night Never Ends (English Novel)
- Ham Par Hijr Utar (Urdu Poetry)
- Mujh Main Sooraj Doob Gaya (Urdu Poetry)
- Aitekaf (Urdu Naat)
- Awaz (Urdu poetry)

== Drama serials ==
Ali Moeen has written several award-winning drama serials.

- Rangbaaz
- Ali Ki Ammi
- Sarmaya
- Noor Mahal
- Baatein dil ki
- Phool waali galli
- Azzal
- Khali Aankhain
- Aik dafa ka zikar hai
- Yeh zindagi – an 18-episode drama serial for ARY Digital
- Makaan Number 47 – a 19-episode comedy serial, ARY Digital
- Mohlat – a 6-episode Indus Vision TV telefilm presented by Gaza Entertainment, produced by Infinity Films
- Marzi (Geo TV)
- Khwaab Nagar Ki Shehzadi
- Mor Moharaan (TV One)
- Jhooti (2020)
- Jo Bichar Gaye (2021)

== Telefilms and plays ==
- Reshman To Jhalli Hai – An Indus Vision TV telefilm by Gaza Entertainment, produced by Infinity Films.
- Rasheed Mechanic Ko Pata Tha – An Indus Vision telefilm by Gaza Entertainment, produced by Infinity Films.
- Aaina Wohi Rehta Hai – A telefilm awarded 1st Prize at the Pakistan Television Corporation (PTV) Film Aalmi Adab Se Intikhab Festival (2005)
- Main Hoon – A 2005 New Year special telefilm for GEO TV.
- Aik Thee Julia – A telefilm for Aaj TV.
- Koi To Ho Ga – A telefilm for Aaj TV.
- Daira – A telefilm by GEO TV based on the novel Moth Smoke
- Bus Stand – An adaptation of a Manto story telecast from Indus Vision
- Bhook Lag Rahi Hai: A 50-minute, one-scene drama for PTV produced by Evernew Studios and also selected as a NAPA script writing reference
- Khaali Bench – A love story televised on GEO TV.
- Dada Ki Subah – A long play for GEO TV by Imago Films
- Second Chance – A 25 December (Quaid-e-Azam Day) telefilm on ARY Digital
- Short Cut – A tele film for ARY Digital starring Moeen Akhtar and Anwar Maqsood
- Gathri – A telefilm for IQ Entertainment
- Band Khirki Sey Bahar – A film festival movie
- Matlab Kya ? – 6 September, a special Defence Day play
- Hai Koi…? – A special 25 December play for Ary Digital
- Radio Wala Ghar – A telefilm for ARY Digital
- Ab Kya Karain – A telefilm for ARY Digital
- Kya Baat Hai – A 3-episode sitcom, which was a Nida Studios Production for PTV World
- Short Circuit – Comic-Satirical Skits for Pakistan Television Corporation (PTV)
- Eid vs Mobarak – A sitcom long play for PTV
- Raasta – A 13-episode series based on psychological diseases, which was a Target Entertainment & Imago Films joint production and sponsored by Pfizer
- Royals Rescue 15 – A 13-episode docudrama series, a Nucleus Entertainment Presentation for PTV
- Darwaza – 6-episode miniseries on psycho-social issues for Indus Vision
- Professor, Vespa Aur Faqeerni
- Main Auraton Say Parda Karna Chahta Hun
- Kyon…! Meray Bhai Ki Shadi Hai
- Qurban Ki Qurbani
- Hakeem Bodla K Teen Betay
- Aik Aadh Hafta – Hum TV Tele Film Festival (2008)
- Band Toh Baje Ga (2018) Hum TV
- Aashiq (2019)

== Magazine TV shows ==
- MPO – Tuck-a-Truck Show – Magazine Program. A Writers Bloc presentation produced by Infinity Films
- K2 Ka Challenge – A quiz show by Lakson Tobacco Company, which was a Nucleus Entertainment Production
- Ham Na Manein Haar – A 13-episode magazine show for Unilever Pakistan. It is a MindShare project on Pakistan Television Corporation (PTV)
- Morven Gold Adventure Team – An adventure magazine show set in Bali Indonesia. It was a Nucleus Entertainment Production
- Missing Children Campaign – A Social Project, Nucleus Entertainment Production
- Sky of the East– – Script Rendition for International Grand Prix 2000 Broadcasting Competition, France. Achieved Consolation Prize
- Aik Aur Pehloo – A program on social issues from ARY Digital
- Sangam – A magazine program for ARY Digital
- Naiki – Special IDs – 15 Special IDs on the occasion of Ramazan, ARY Digital
- Cyber Net Calling Mars – produced by I'ON Entertainment for PTV Network
- Buniyad – A concept for rehabilitation of earthquake-stricken areas and people of which 26 episodes have gone on air on ARY Digital
- Baray Log – A magazine show on unsung heroes of Pakistan for ARY Digital
- Documentaries & Corporate Videos: Memon Community – A Journey Through Time on DHL; – The Story of Services, Bank Alfalah – Shahdin Manzil, 23 March; – Aik Tareekhi Sach, 14 August – Pakistan, 11 September; – the Death Anniversary of Quaid-e-Azam, Aao Ahad Karain – A 23 March Documentary

== Lyrics and theme songs ==
- "Sarmaya, Reshman To Jhalli Hai"
- "Rasheed Mechanic Ko Pata Tha"
- "Mohlat"
- "Muqam"
- "Mohabat Ki Pehli Kahani"
- "Maa" (mother)
- "Khaali Aankhain"
- Yeh Hum Naheen ("Peace Song") for GEO TV sung by Sajjad Ali, Ali Azmat, Ahmed Jahanzeb, Fakhir, Fakhar-e-Alam & Ali Haider & Others
- Rangeen, "Chal Rein De" and Chahar Balish by the musician Sajjad Ali
- Pakistan Mein Pakistan Nahin Milta (2017)

== See also ==
- List of Pakistani writers
