= Faisal Qureshi =

Faisal Qureshi or Faysal Qureshi may refer to:

- Faisal Qureshi (comedian), Pakistani television actor
- Faysal Qureshi (actor), Pakistani actor and television host
