= Aatish (TV series) =

2018 Pakistani television series

- Hina Altaf (left) and Azfar Rehman
- Urdu: آتش
- Genre: Drama; Romance
- Developed by: Azhar Ali
- Written by: Shagufta Bhatti
- Directed by: Saima Waseem
- Starring: Azfar Rehman; Hina Altaf Khan
- Theme music composer: Hassan Munir
- Opening theme: Singers; Ali Tariq; Bushra; Lyrics by Sabir Zafar
- Composer: Hassan Munir
- Country of origin: Pakistan
- Original language: Urdu
- No. of episodes: 29

Production
- Producer: Momina Duraid
- Production company: MD Productions

Original release
- Network: Hum TV
- Release: 20 August 2018 – 4 March 2019

Aatish (Urdu: آتش, lit. 'Fire') is a Pakistani serial created by Momina Duraid and written by Shagufta Bhatti. The 29-episode serial aired on Hum TV from 20 August 2018 until 4 March 2019 and starred Azfar Rehman and Hina Altaf.

== Summary ==
The story begins with an orphan girl named Asma, abandoned by her mother, who was a maid. Her mother has left her to protect Asma from being sold by her alcoholic father (Asma's grandfather), and asks her employer to raise Asma. The employer agrees and raises Asma, who enjoys doing all the work in the house rather than studying. She is considered a maid even though Asma considers herself a family member.

A family from the United States visits the house in search of a suitable wife for their eldest son. They also arrive with the younger son, Shehryar, who treats Asma as a servant and in a degrading manner. The household wants Asma to marry the house driver so that she can remain as a maid. Asma is deeply hurt to know that after all these years, the family still thinks of her as a maid rather than part of the family. Later, Shehryar falls in love with Asma, and they secretly get marry. Shehryar's mother, Noureen, disapproves of Asma and tries to degrade her, but is unaware of the marriage. Shehryar returns to the United States to complete Asma's paperwork, where he is injured and falls into a coma. Asma is bereft and makes dua for him. Later, Asma is ill, and Anna Bi, the household help, takes her to a doctor and discovers Asma is pregnant. Asma becomes depressed. Anna Bi persuades Asma to reveal the father's name. Asma tells her that the father is Shehryar, which angers Anna Bi. Later, Anna Bi visits Asma, sympathizes with her, asks her for proof of the pregnancy, and Asma shows her test results. Nazia then destroys the test results and plans to send Asma away from the house. Nazia asks Anna Bi for help and tells her to lie to Asma, saying that her mother is alive and wants to see her before she dies. Eventually, Asma tells everyone that she is pregnant but will not reveal the father's identity, which angers them. Asma then has a car accident with a couple who take her to the hospital and then allow Asma to stay at their house. Shehryar, who has returned, becomes friends with the husband of the couple not knowing that Asma is living in their house. Shehryar then sees the husband help Asma which makes him think that she has betrayed him. Asma is deeply hurt by her husband and vows revenge. She manages to tell Shehryar what happened to her which he already knew having learned it from Anna Bi. Nazia adopts her super havoc form and fights Asma. Then Shehryar agrees to marry Sumbul, but finds Asma, hugs her and then refuses to marry Sumbul. Sumbul is not upset because she didn't want to marry him anyway. Asma and Shehryar live happily ever after.

== Cast ==
- Azfar Rehman as Sheheryar
- Hina Altaf as Asma
- Azra Mamsoor as Noureen's mother, Shehryar's grandmother
- Bigul Hussain
- Saba Hameed as Noureen, Shehryar's mother
- Akeel Abbas as Saad, Noureen's brother
- Madiha Rizvi as Nazia; Saad's wife
- Anam Goher as Sumbul, Nazia's sister
- Faisal Rehman as Sameer
- Shermeen Ali as Zara, Sameer's wife
- Jahanara Hai as Sameer's mother

== Reception ==
The drama received good ratings and competed with ARY's Balaa. Aatish's episodes have gotten millions of views on YouTube. It became instant hit, and gained high TRPs as 10.1 and 12.6 TRPs at its highest.

=== Nominations ===
Year	Awards	Category	Recipient	Result
February 7, 2020	PISA 2020	Best Television Actress	Hina Altaf	Nominated

== Soundtrack ==
The title song was sung by Ali Tariq & Bushra. The music was composed by Hassan Munir and the lyrics written by Sabir Zafar.
