= Anmol Baloch =

Pakistani television actress and model

- Born: Anmol Baloch; 10 January 1998 (age 28); Karachi, Pakistan
- Occupations: Actress, model
- Years active: 2016–present
- Known for: Qurbatein, Aik Sitam Aur, Sirf Tum, Iqtidar

Anmol Baloch (born 10 January 1998) is a Pakistani television actress and model. She is known for her roles as Ushna in Aik Sitam Aur, Abeer in the series Sirf Tum, and Mehr-un-Nissa in Iqtidar.

== Career ==
=== 2016-2020 ===
Baloch started out as a model but later ventured into acting. In 2016, she made her debut in the A-Plus Entertainment television series Kambakht Tanno. In 2017, she appeared in the Geo Entertainment television series Bedardi Saiyaan. She also appeared in TV One's Jalti Barish. In 2018, she guest starred in Express Entertainment's anthology television series Kabhi Band Kabhi Baja in the episode Laila Ka Jadoo. She also starred in Hum TV's Aik Larki Aam Si as Anmol the same year. In 2019, she had a main role in the Hum TV television film Pyaar Kahani alongside Asim Azhar and Hania Amir. She appeared in the Hum TV historical television series Deewar-e-Shab which was nominated for the 1st Pakistan International Screen Awards. She played the main role of Sajeeda in the Pakistani-Malaysian co-produced television series Sara Sajeeda. In 2020, she guest starred in the A-Plus Entertainment television series Haqeeqat in the episode "Badnaam Mohabbat". She starred in the Express Entertainment television series Saza e Ishq as Rameen alongside Azfar Rehman. Baloch played the main role of Areeba in the Hum TV television series Qurbatein.

=== 2021-present ===
Baloch played the negative role in the ARY Digital television series Khwaab Nagar Ki Shehzadi. She played the lead role in A-Plus Entertainment television series Noor alongside Usama Khan. in 2022, She played lead in Aik Sitam Aur on ARY Digital and negative lead in Siyani on Geo TV. In 2023, she played lead roles in Mann Aangan on ARY Digital, Sirf Tum and Shiddat on Geo TV. In 2024-25 she played lead role in Green Entertainment television's series Iqtidar.

== Filmography ==
=== Television ===
Year	Title	Role	Network	Notes
2016	Kambhakt Tanno		A Plus Entertainment	Debut
2017	Jalti Barish	Hooram	Tv One	Supporting role
2017	Bedardi Saiyaan	Tara	Geo Entertainment	Supporting role
2018	Aik Larki Aam Si	Anmol	Hum TV	Lead role
2018	Kabhi Band Kabhi Baja	Laila	Express Entertainment	Episode 16 - Laila Ka Jaadu
2019	Deewar-e-Shab	Rabiya Islam	Hum TV	Supporting role
2019	Pyar Kahani	Sumbul	Hum TV	Telefilm
2019	Sara Sajeeda	Sajeeda Khan	TV3	Lead role
2020	Saza e Ishq	Rameen Faris	Express Entertainment	Lead role
2020	Haqeeqat	Maheen	A Plus Entertainment	Episode 8 - Badnaam Mohabbat
2020	Qurbatain	Areeba	Hum TV	Parallel lead
2021	Khwaab Nagar Ki Shehzadi	Sehar	ARY Digital	Negative lead
2021	Noor	Noor	A Plus Entertainment	Lead role
2022	Aik Sitam Aur	Ushna Shahroz	ARY Digital	Lead role
2022	Siyani	Kiran	Geo Entertainment	Negative lead
2023	Mann Aangan	Mahnoor	ARY Digital	Lead role
2023	Sirf Tum	Abeer Hanan	Geo Entertainment	Lead role
2023–24	Shiddat	Asra Sultan	Geo Entertainment	Lead role
2024–25	Iqtidar	Mehr-un-Nisa Shah	Green Entertainment	Lead role
2025–26	Neeli Kothi	Zara	Hum TV	Lead role
