= Hina Afridi =

Pakistani actress (born 2001)

- Born: Multan, Punjab, Pakistan
- Occupations: Actress, Model
- Years active: 2021–present

Hina Afridi (Urdu: حنا آفریدی) is a Pakistani actress and model who works in Urdu television and film. She made her acting debut in the television drama Pehli Si Muhabbat (2021).

== Career ==
Afridi made her television debut in 2021 with the romantic drama Pehli Si Muhabbat, which aired on ARY Digital. The drama was produced by iDream Entertainment and directed by Anjum Shahzad. Her performance received attention for its freshness and on-screen presence.

Afridi appeared in the film Akhara (2024) and also starred in the Hum TV drama serial Raaja Rani (2025), in which she performed alongside veteran actor Faysal Quraishi. Her other projects include's Babar Javed's Ghulam Badshah Sundri opposite Imran Ashraf.

Apart from acting, she has participated in various modeling assignments and fashion shoots, establishing herself as a recognized face in Pakistan.

== Filmography ==
=== Television ===
Key
†	Denotes films that have not yet been released

Year	Title	Role	Notes	Ref(s)
2021	Pehli Si Muhabbat	Bushra		
2023	Kacha Dhaga			
2024	Akhara	Reshma		
2024	Qissa e Dil		Debut as Lead	
2025	Raaja Rani	Rani		
2026	Ghulam Bashah Sundri	Sundri		
2026	Mirza Ki Heer	Heer		
2026	Mitti De Baway	Qamar-un-Nisa		

=== Telefilm ===
Year	Title	Role	Network	Ref(s)
2025	A-One Travel		ARY Digital	
