= Aatish Bhalaik =

Indian cricketer (born 1991)

Personal information
- Born: 5 December 1991 (age 34); Shimla, Himachal Pradesh
- Batting: Right-handed
- Role: Wicket-keeper

Domestic team information
- Years: Team
- 2012-: Himachal Pradesh
- 2013: DAV College
- Source: ESPNcricinfo, 26 February 2016

Aatish Bhalaik (born 5 December 1991) is an Indian cricketer who plays for Himachal Pradesh. He was born in Shimla.
