= List of Pakistani television series =

Pakistani Drama series or Programs

This is a list of Pakistani dramas. The programs are organised alphabetically.

== A ==
- Aankh Salamat Andhay Log
- Aahista Aahista (2014, Hum TV)
- Aangan Terha (1980s, PTV)
- Aangan (2018, Hum TV)
- Aangan (2017, ARY Digital)
- Aansoo (2000, PTV)
- Aao Laut Chalein (2017, Geo Entertainment)
- Aap ki Kaneez (2015, Geo Entertainment)
- Aashti (2009, Hum TV)
- Aasmanon Pay Likha (2013, Geo TV)
- Aatish (2018, Hum TV)
- Ab Dekh Khuda Kya Karta Hai (2018, Geo Entertainment)
- Adhi Gawahi (2017, Hum TV)
- Adhoora Bandhan (Geo Entertainment)
- Adhoori Aurat (2013, Geo TV)
- Adan (2023)
- Ahmed Habib Ki Betiyan (2011, Hum TV)
- Aik Nayee Cinderella (2012, Geo TV)
- Agar Tum Sath Ho (2025)
- Aik Thi Raniya (Geo Entertainment)
- Aik Thi Misaal (2015, Hum TV)
- Ainak Wala Jin (1993–96, PTV)
- Aisi Hai Tanhai (2017, ARY Digital)
- Akbari Asghari (2011, Hum TV)
- Akhri Barish (2011, Hum TV)
- Aks (2012, ARY Digital)
- Alif (Geo Entertainment)
- Alif Allah Aur Insaan (2017, Hum TV)
- Alif Noon (1980s, PTV)
- Alpha Bravo Charlie (1998, PTV)
- Alvida (2015, Hum TV)
- Ana (Geo Entertainment)
- Angar Wadi (1994, PTV)
- Ankahi (1982, PTV)
- Anokha Ladla (2011, PTV)
- Aseerzadi (2013, Hum TV)
- Ashk (2012, Geo TV)
- Aunn Zara (2013, A-Plus Entertainment)
- Aik Hai Nigar
- Aakhri Station
- Aitebaar
- Anaa
- Aik Thi Laila
- Aik Aur Pakeezah

== B ==
- Baaghi (2017, Urdu 1)
- Baba Jani (2018, Geo Entertainment)
- Baityaan (2009, Hum TV)
- Balaa(2018, ARY Digital)
- Band Khirkiyan
- Bandhay Aik Dor Say (2020, Geo Entertainment)
- Bandish (2019, ARY Digital)
- Bari Apa
- Barson Baad
- Bashar Momin
- Bay Dardi
- Bay Khudi
- Bay Qasoor
- Bedardi Saiyaan (Geo Entertainment)
- Behkawa (Geo Entertainment)
- Belapur Ki Dayan
- Besharam
- Beti
- Behroopia
- Bharosa Pyar Tera
- Bholi Bano (2017, Geo Entertainment)
- Bhool
- Bikhra Mera Naseeb (Geo Entertainment)
- Bilqees Kaur
- Bin Roye
- Bojh (Geo Entertainment)
- Bol Meri Machli (Geo Entertainment)
- Boota from Toba Tek Singh
- Bulbulay
- Bunty I Love You
- Banno
- Badshah Begum
- Bakhtawar

== C ==
- Challenger
- Cheekh (2019, ARY Digital)
- Chand TaraARY Digital)
- Chemistry (2010, Geo Entertainment)
- Chupke Chupke (2021, HUM TV)
- Chup Raho (2014, ARY Digital)
- Coke Kahani (2012, syndicated)

== D ==
- Daagh
- Daam
- Daasi
- Daddy
- Daldal
- Dar Si Jaati Hai Sila
- Daray Daray Naina
- Darr Khuda Say
- Dasht
- Dastaan
- Dastak
- De Ijazat Jo Tu
- De Ijazat
- Deewangi (Geo Entertainment)
- Dekho Chaand Aaya (Geo Entertainment)
- Dhaani (Geo Entertainment)
- Dharkan (2016)
- Dhoop Kinarey
- Dhundle Raste
- Dhuwan
- DuniyaPur
- Digest Writer
- Dil e Muztar
- Dil Ishq (Geo Entertainment)
- Dil Kiya Karay (Geo Entertainment)
- Dil Lagi
- Dil Mom Ka Diya
- Dil Muhallay Ki Haveli (Geo Entertainment)
- Dil-e-Beqraar (2016)
- Dilfareb (Geo Entertainment)
- Dil Nawaz (A Plus TV)
- Diyar-e-Dil
- Do Bol
- Do Qadam Door Thay (Geo Entertainment)
- Dobara
- Doosri Biwi
- Doraha (Geo Entertainment)
- Dugdugi
- Dulhan
- Durr-e-Shehwar
- Dil Ruba
- Dil Awaiz
- Dikhawa
- Dil Tera Hogaya
- DARD
- Dunk
- Dil Wali Gali Mein
- Doctor Bahu
- Dekh Zara Pyar Se

== E ==
- Ehd-e-Wafa
- Ek Tamanna Lahasil Si

== F ==
- Family Front
- Fitoor
- Fitrat
- Firaaq
- Faryaad
- Fraud
- Fairy Tale
- Faraar

== G ==
- Gharoor
- Ghaao
- Ghar Titli Ka Par
- Ghazi Shaheed
- Gohar-e-Nayab
- Goya
- Gumrah
- Gul-e-Rana
- Gul-o-Gulzar
- Guzaarish
- Ghalati
- Ghissi Pitti Mohabbat
- Gulls & Guys
- Guru
- Gumn

== H ==
- Haara Dil
- Haiwan
- Hadsa
- Heer Ranjha
- Hum Tehray Gunahgaar
- Humnasheen
- Humsafar
- Hasad
- Hum Tum
- Hum Kahan Ke Sachay Thay
- Humraaz
- Humrahi

== I ==
- I-Techie
- Iffet
- Iqtidar
- Ishq Gumshuda
- Ishq Hamari Galiyon Mein
- Ishq Di Chashni
- Ishq Ibadat
- Ishq Jalebi
- Ishq Junoon Deewangi
- Ishq Mein Kaafir
- Ishq Mein Teray
- Ishq Tamasha
- Ishq Zahe Naseeb
- Inkaar
- Ishqiya
- Izteraab
- Iltija
- Ishq Hai
- Intezaar
- Inteqam
- Ibn-e-Hawwa
- Ishq-e-Laa
- Ishq Murshid

== J ==
- Jaan'nisar
- Jab We Wed
- Jackson Heights
- Jal Pari
- Jalebiyan
- Jhoot
- Jhoothi
- Jugnoo
- Jannat Se Aagay
- Jindo
- Jhoom
- Jama Taqseem

== K ==
- Kabhi Kabhi
- Kabhi Main Kabhi Tum
- Kadoorat
- Kafeel
- Kafir
- Kahani Raima Aur Manahil Ki
- Kahi Unkahi
- Kuch Ankahi
- Kahin Deep Jaley
- Kaisa Hai Naseeban
- Kankar
- Karadayi
- Karb
- Kash Mein Teri Beti Na Hoti
- Kashf
- Kashkol
- Kathputli (2016)
- Khaali Haath
- Khaani
- Khaas
- Khasara
- Khamoshi
- Khoya Khoya Chand
- Khuda Dekh Raha Hai
- Khuda Ki Basti
- Khuda Mera Bhi Hai
- Khushi Ek Roag
- Khwaab Ankhain Khwahish Chehre
- Ki Jaana Main Kaun
- Kis Din Mera Viyah Howay Ga
- Kis Ki Ayegi Baraat series (2009–2012)
- Annie ki Ayegi Baraat (2012)
- Azar Ki Ayegi Baraat (2009)
- Dolly Ki Ayegi Baraat (2010)
- Takkay ki Ayegi Baraat (2011)
- Kitna Satatay Ho
- Koi Chand Rakh
- Kuch Kar Dikha
- Khudparast
- Khuda Aur Mohabbat
- Khuda Aur Mohabbat
- Khuda Aur Mohabbat 3
- Khan
- Kasa-e-Dil
- Kuch Pyar Ka Pagalpan Bhi Tha

== L ==
- Ladoon Mein Pali
- Laaj
- Laag
- Ladies Park
- Lagaao
- Landa Bazar
- Laal Ishq (A-Plus)
- Lamhay
- Lashkara
- Laapata

== M ==
- Muhabbat Yun Bhi Hoti Hai
- Main Khayal Hoon Kisi Aur Ka
- Maat
- Madiha Maliha
- Mah-e-Tamaam
- Main Abdul Qadir Hoon
- Main Chand Si
- Main Gunehgar Nahi
- Manto
- Malaal
- Malika-e-Aliya
- Manay Na Ye Dil
- Mann Ke Moti
- Mann Mayal
- Mannchalay
- Mata-e-Jaan Hai Tu
- Mar Jain Bhi To Kya
- Marasim
- Marvi
- Maryam
- Mastana Mahi
- Mausam
- Meer Abru
- Mehar Bano aur Shah Bano
- Mehar Posh
- Mehmoodabad Ki Malkain
- Mehndi
- Mein Hari Piya
- Mein
- Mere Humsafar
- Meem Se Mohabbat
- Mere Ban Jao
- Mera Naam Yousuf Hai
- Mera Saaein
- Mera Saaein 2
- Mera Yaqeen
- Mere Harjai
- Mere Qatil Mere Dildar
- Mere Humdum Mere Dost
- Mere Meherbaan
- Meray Paas Tum Ho
- Meri Behan Maya
- Meri Behan Meri Dewrani
- Meri Dulari
- Meri Ladli
- Meri Maa
- Meri Saheli Meri Humjoli
- Meri Zaat Zarra-e-Benishan
- Mil Ke Bhi Hum Na Mile
- Mirat Ul Uroos
- Mishaal
- Mohabat Subh Ka Sitara Hai
- Mohabbat Jaye Bhar Mein
- Mohabbat Tumse Nafrat Hai
- Mohabbat Rooth Jaye Toh
- Mohabbat Tujhe Alvida
- Mol
- Mubarak Ho Beti Hui Hai
- Muhabbat Ab Nahi Hugi
- Mujhay Sandal Kar Do
- Mujhe Khuda Pe Yaqeen Hai
- Muqabil
- Munafiq
- Mushk
- Mushrik
- Maana Ka Gharana
- Mere Bewafa
- Meray Humnasheen
- Mohlat
- Mujhe Pyaar Hua Tha
- My Dear Cinderella
- Mann Jogi
- Main Manto Nahi Hoon
- Muamma

== N ==
- Na Kaho Tum Mere Nahi
- Naagin
- Nadamat
- Nail Polish
- Nanhi
- Neelam Ghar
- Neeyat
- Nibah
- Nijaat
- Nikhar Gaye Gulab Sare
- Noor Bano
- Noor Pur Ki Rani
- Numm
- Noor Jahan
- Nadaan

== O ==
- Omer Dadi Aur Gharwale
- O Rangreza

== P ==
- Pakistan Idol
- Pani Jaisa Piyar
- Parsa
- Pathjar Ke Baad
- Phir Chand Pe Dastak
- Pyaray Afzal
- Pukaar
- Pagli
- Parchayee
- Parchaiyan
- Pyar Ke Sadqay
- Prem Gali
- Parizaad
- Paristaan
- Parwarish

== Q ==
- Qaid-e-Tanhai
- Qayamat
- Quddusi Sahab Ki Bewah
- Qurban
- Qurbatain
- Qaid
- Qismat
- Qarz e Jaan

== R ==
- Rabba Mainu Maaf Kareen
- Raju Rocket
- Rang Mahal
- Rani
- Rehaai
- Riyasat
- Ru Baru
- Rubber Band
- Ranjha Ranjha Kardi
- Ready Steady Go
- Romeo Weds Heer
- Ruswai
- Ruposh
- Raaz-e-Ulfat
- Rasm E Duniya
- Roag
- Raqs-e-Bismil

== S ==
- Saat Pardon Mein
- Saaya
- Sabaat
- Sadqay Tumhare
- Saiqa
- Samjhauta Express
- Sammi
- Sang-e-Mar Mar
- Sangat
- Sangsar
- Sanjha
- Shanakht
- Shehnai
- Shehr-e-Zaat
- Shehrnaz
- Shehzori
- Shert
- Sinf-e-Aahan
- Shukk
- Silsilay (Geo Entertainment)
- Sitamgar
- Sun Yaara
- Susraal Mera
- Sona Chandi
- Suno Chanda
- Suno Chanda 2
- Susraal Mera
- Surkh Jorra
- Surkh Chandni
- Shahrukh Ki Saliyan
- Sang-e-Mah
- Sher

== T ==
- Tinkay
- Tabeer
- Tarap
- Tawaan
- Tere Bin
- Tere Mere Beech
- Tumhare Siwa
- Tumhari Natasha
- Tum Ho Wajah
- Talafi
- Tanhaiyan
- Teri Meri Love Story
- Tumharey Husn Ke Naam
- Tan Man Neelo Neel
- Tum Larkay Bhi Na

== U ==
- Udaari
- Uff Yeh Mohabbat
- Ullu Baraye Farokht Nahi
- Uncle Urfi
- Uraan (2010)
- Uraan (2020)

== V ==
Vanee (2005) Geotv

- Vasl
- Visaal
- Waris
- Woh
- Woh Dobara
- Wilco
- Waada
- Woh Pagal Si
- Woh Ziddi Si

== Y ==
- Yaqeen Ka Safar
- Yeh Dil Mera
- Yeh Zindagi Hai
- Yeh Raha Dil
- Yunhi

== Z ==
- Zaakham
- Zara Yaad Kar
- Zard Mausam
- Zebaish (HUM TV)
- Zeenat Bint-e-Sakina Hazir Ho
- Zid
- Zindagi Dhoop Tum Ghana Saya
- Zindagi Gulzar Hai
- Zip Bus Chup Raho
- Zulm
- Zard Patton ka Bunn
