= Bhool =

Bhool may refer to:

- Bhool (2014 TV series), a Pakistani soap series
- Bhool (2019 TV series), a Pakistani television series
