= Sila (2016 TV series) =

Pakistani television series

- Also known as: صلہ
- Genre: Family drama; Romantic drama
- Written by: Sadia Akhtar
- Directed by: Syed Aabis Raza
- Starring: Ainy Jaffri; Farhan Saeed; Ismat Zaidi; Eshita Syed; Javed Sheikh; Farah Shah; Shakeel; Shamim Hilaly
- Opening theme: Singer; Farhan Saeed; Lyrics by Sabir Zafar
- Composer: Abbas Ali Khan
- Country of origin: Pakistan
- Original language: Urdu
- No. of episodes: 18

Production
- Cinematography: Atif Hussain; Azhar Ali; Khizer Gul
- Editors: Afzal Fayyaz; Chief editor Mahmood Ali
- Camera setup: Multi-camera setup

Original release
- Network: Hum TV, Hum Network Limited
- Release: 28 October 2016 – 3 March 2017

Related
- Dharkan

Sila (Urdu: صلہ; lit: Result), is a Pakistani television drama serial, that aired on 28 October 2016, preceded by Dharkan. It stars Shakeel, Farhan Saeed, Ainy Jaffri, and Ismat Zaidi in key roles.

It aired every Fridays at 9:10pm PST. Ainy Jaffri makes her return to Hum TV after she was last seen in the channel's serial, Aseerzadi. Farhan Saeed was last seen in the serial Udaari. Eshita was last seen in the channel's Zindagi Tujh Ko Jiya.

== Cast ==
- Farhan Saeed as Taimoor
- Ainy Jaffri as Mariam
- Eshita as Mishal
- Shakeel as Aleem
- Ismat Zaidi as Razia
- Javed Sheikh as Ehsaan
- Farah Shah as Nargis
- Madiha Zaidi as Mehwish
- Hina Javed as Mehwish
- Haya Sehgal as Farkhanda
- Arjumand Azhar as Jahangir
- Tehmina Siddiqui as Sana
- Shamim Hilaly as Sajjad's mother

Farhan Saeed

== Plot ==
Mariam belongs to a middle-class family. Her father is a retired banker and her mother teaches in a school. Mariam gets a scholarship to medical college where she falls in love with Taimoor, the son of a surgeon. Taimoor’s mother wants him to marry her niece, but the duo gets married against her wishes and starts a new life in a middle-class neighbourhood. What does life have in store for them? Maryam meets her professor and starts a job with him. Taimoor dislikes this as he thinks that it is his job to earn bread and butter. Here Taimoor's father and Niece Mishal trick him to think that Maryam is having an affair with her boss and saw them coming out of a five-star hotel kissing when Maryam said her father had a heart attack. Taimoor goes into depression and smokes. He slaps Maryam and then apologises but this causes a breakage in the love of the duo. Maryam goes to her father's house and finds that she is five months pregnant. She stays the night and Taimoor thinks that she is lying and gets angry. He shifts back to his dad's house and agrees to marry Mishal. Maryam goes to his office and tells him she is pregnant, but he says that he will be divorcing her soon and this child is Sajjad's. Maryam slaps him and leaves. Taimoor gets a call for a concert and opens his email where he realises Maryam was right. He refuses to marry Mishal and tells Maryam to come to this concert where she forgives him after putting her hand on her womb after Taimoor asks forgiveness for the sake of his child.

== Production ==
=== Filming ===
It was heard that this drama was shot in 2013 but it would air in 2016 starring Farhan Saeed and Ainy Jaffri. The whole shooting is done in United Medical and Dental College UMDC, a medical college in Karachi.

=== Casting ===
Initially Fahad Mustafa was selected to play the titular character but then he rejected due to movies. So the drama was reshot with Farhan Saeed as main lead.

MD Productions chose cast Ainy Jaffri as Mariam, Farhan Saeed as Taimoor, Javed Sheikh as Ahsan, Farah Shah as Nargis, Haya Sehgal as elder sister of Marium, Farkhanda and Tehmina Siddiqui as her younger sister, Sana. Shakeel and Ismat Zaidi play role of Mariam and her siblings' parents. While, Eshita Syed was chosen to play character of Mishal, who is chosen by Taimoor's parents for his marriage. Arjumand Azhar (Hussain) was chosen for the role of Jahangir (Mishal's father) and "Uncredited" to portray role of Nargis' sister and Mishal's mother role. Meanwhile, Shakeel and Ismat Zaidi are playing role of Mariyam and her siblings' parents. The drama has already been a hit. Both the leads had immediate successes following the drama as Farhan Saeed gained a lot of fans and released new awesome songs and Ainy Jaffri made her awesome movie debut in the movie Balu Mahi.

== See also ==
- List of programs broadcast by Hum TV
- 2016 in Pakistani television
