= Naseer & Shahab =

- Origin: Khyber Pakhtunkhwa; Islamabad, Pakistan
- Genres: Soft rock; Alternative rock
- Years active: 2010–present
- Label: Rearts
- Members: Naseer Afridi; Shahab Qamar
- Website: facebook.com/naseerandshahab

Naseer & Shahab (Urdu: نصیر اور شہاب) is a Pakistani soft alternative rock band from Khyber Pakhtunkhwa. Formed in 2010, the band rose to stardom with their debut single "Za Pukhtoon Yam". The band is a duo of Naseer Afridi, who is a lead vocalist, musician and songwriter, and Shahab Qamar, a producer, director and web designer. Naseer & Shahab release singles independently, in mainly Pashtu language, propelled to international success by social media, Naseer & Shahab's four singles "Za Pukhtoon Yam" (2012), "Za Sta Pashan Na Yam" (2012), "Meray Yaar" (2012) and "Ghalti Mein Shta" (2014), topped many charts and made them most influential and first Pashto rock band of Pakistan.

For their work, they received a nomination of Best Radio Rock Band at Radio 91 Awards, and the Best Emerging Band at 12th Lux Style Awards. For "Ghalti Mein Shta" duo received two nominations including Best Music Video and Best Music Single, with the former winning for Shahab.

== History ==
=== 2010–2015: "Za Pakhtoon Yam" and "Ghalti Mein Shta" ===
In 2010, Qamar Shahab and Naseer Afridi both met online through Facebook, having an origin of Pakhtoon ethnicity. Qamar resided in Australia while Naseer lived in Islamabad. However, they came across and recorded their first two singles through internet, "Rise on Your Broken Knees" and "Za Pakhtoon Yam". In an interview, Naseer stated, "For our first two songs, "Rise on Your Broken Knees" and "Za Pakhtoon Yam", Shahab used to send me his music. After that, I would record my vocals on it and send it back to him. That's how we started." Among their first two singles duo release "Rise on Your Broken Knees" first which wasn't a hit and did below the average at topping charts. However, is gave the duo enough recognition so they could upload their second release. Overwhelming response from the audience led the artists to eventually meet and work on their second single for a better music video and re-release of the "Za Pakhtoon Yam". For the video, most of the shoot was done in Peshawar, while the rest was completed in Karachi. The song was sung entirely in Pashto language, giving an inspirational message about Pakhtuns. According to the duo, it is about giving them their identity. Speaking about the song, Naseer explained, "The song is thematic. The reason why we recorded it in the first place was not only because we wanted Pakhtuns to relate to it but also to encourage like-minded Pakhtuns to celebrate their identity."

Success of "Za Pakhtoon Yam", established the duo as a music band in the industry, cherishing the success Qamar says, "The most exciting part is the non-Pakhtuns coming in and expressed their genuine feelings and I think that is our biggest achievement to date", while Naseer who penned down the song summarize, "I have tried my best to put the true Pashto identity in a compressed form in these verses. We have had so many peace loving people in our cultural history but sadly we never promote them. People aren't even aware of the fact that musician Haroon Bacha was threatened by conservative parties that he would be banished from Pakistan if doesn't stop making music in K-P."

After the success of "Za Pakhtoon Yam", the duo released "Za Sata Pashan Nayam" (I am not like you), which led to nationwide acclaim. The duo sung this song in the last episode of the seventh installment of the Pakistani music series Coke Studio. It was well-received by critics, earning critical acclaim, and was among the Top 10 songs of 2014.

In 2012, the duo released their first Urdu single, "Meray Yaar". It was a major hit, and led to the band receiving a nomination at the 12th Lux Style Awards in the Best Emerging Band category. The duo then digitally released single called "Pakistan" on their official Facebook page.

In 2013, duo released their fifth single "Ghalti Mein Shta" (It is my fault), to further acclaim. and was ranked on number ten in top songs of 2014. The song received two nominations at the 3rd Hum Awards. The duo released their sixth single "Born a Dead Man" on 13 April 2015, for which they earlier released a prologue. They were then reported to be working on their first studio album.

=== 2016–present: Hero; and upcoming album ===
On 26 January 2016, the duo announced on their Facebook page that their sixth single "Hero" from their upcoming album would be released on 5 February 2016. In an interview with The Express Tribune, Naseer explained, “Our latest release is primarily a rock song infused with elements of electronic music and electro-rock,” shared Naseer. “The idea behind the track is for people to acknowledge that every person is the hero of their own story." Talking with same publication, Shahab described their experience of making the video visually aesthetic with strong animation. He said, "The main challenge was to learn most of the VFX from scratch, which involved spending hours watching tutorials for chroma key [green screen] and 3D, online." Shahab said their influence behind "Hero" was "deep spaces, supernovas and alien landscapes". According to Shahab, ambient, spacey synths were the triggers behind the concept which took shape after discussions with band member Naseer Afridi saying, "I shared the initial draft with Naseer and asked what sort of emotion it stirred within him. He came back to me with a few paraphrased lyrical ideas which helped narrow down my visual approach,."

== Music style and influences ==
The duo's debut single, "Rise on Your Broken Knees" (2011), is predominantly a rock music record, containing elements of soft rock, alternative rock, pop rock, with hard rock and rock influences. The duo's greatest musical inspirations are generally rock and alternative bands. Naseer said in an interview, "We lean toward rock and I am heavily inspired by bands like Green Day, Blink 182, Alter Bridge and Evanescence. Strangely enough, we fused the non-conventional genre of rock with the Pashto language and somehow it worked." Qamar's inspirations include U2, Nirvana, and Coldplay. Discussing his music interests, he said, "We like mixing it up but most of our music is straight-up rock."

== Members ==
The band has two members:

- Naseer Afridi
- Shahab Qamar

== Discography ==
Singles

- "Pakistan"
- "Rise on Your Broken Knees" (2011)
- "Za Pukhtoon Yam" (2012)
- "Za Sta Pashan Na Yam" (2012)
- "Meray Yaar" (2012)
- "Ghalti Mein Shta" (2014)
- "Born a Dead Man" (2015)
- "Hero" (Feb. 5, 2016)

Extras

- "What I've Done" (2013 Linkin Park cover)
- "Za Na Manum " ft. Shayna & Sarmad Ghafoor

== Filmography ==
- Waar (2013) – Cameo appearance by Naseer Afridi.
- Olpers Cream commercial (2012) - Led by Naseer Afridi and Shahab Qamar

== Awards and nominations ==
Year	Award	Category	Work	Results
2012	Radio 91 Awards	Best Radio Rock Band	"Za Pukhtoon Yam"	Nominated
2013	Lux Style Awards	Best Emerging Band	"Meray Yaar"	Nominated
2015	Hum Awards	Best Music Single	"Ghalti Mein Shta"	Nominated
2015	Hum Awards	Best Music Video	"Ghalti Mein Shta"	Won

== See also ==
- List of Pakistani music bands
- List of Pakistani musicians
