= Jackpot (2018 film) =

- Film poster
- Directed by: Shoaib Khan
- Written by: Babar Kashmiri
- Produced by: Khurram Riaz & Shoaib Khan
- Starring: Noor Hassan Rizvi; Sanam Chaudhry; Javed Sheikh; Sana Fakhar; Inayat Khan; Adnan Shah Tipu
- Cinematography: Anubhay Bansal; Sherry
- Edited by: Imran Mushtaq
- Music by: Naveed Nashad
- Production companies: Oriental Films & Shoaib Khan Films
- Distributed by: Oriental Entertainment
- Release date: 6 July 2018
- Running time: 150 minutes
- Country: Pakistan
- Language: Urdu
- Budget: Rs. 4 crore
- Box office: Rs. 3.25 crore

Jackpot is a 2018 Pakistani romantic comedy film directed by Shoaib Khan and produced by Shoaib Khan and Khurram Riaz. The script was written by Babar Kashmiri, and the cinematography was done by Anubhay Bansal& Rana Sherry. The film's leading cast includes Sanam Chaudhry, Noor Hassan Rizvi, Sana Fakhar, Adnan Shah Tipu, Inayat Khan and Javed Sheikh. Celebrities, including Mehmood Aslam, Afzal Khan, Zara Sheikh, Ismail Tara and Meera made cameo appearances in the film.

== Cast ==
=== Main ===
- Noor Hassan Rizvi as Lucky
- Sanam Chaudhry as Chandni
- Adnan Shah Tipu
- Inayat Khan as Sameer
- Sana Fakhar
- Iftikhar Thakur
- Javed Sheikh as Jojo
- Sajan Abbas
- Shoaib Khan as Director

=== Cameo appearances ===
- Zara Sheikh
- Ismail Tara
- Meera
- Afzal Khan Rambo
- Mehmood Aslam
- Saba Faisal

== Release ==
The film was released on 6 July 2018 but due to competition from other film releases, it was pulled off cinema screens. The film was re-released in cinemas on 11 January 2019.

=== Box office ===
The film received mixed reviews from viewers and open with very low opening collection just (0.40 crore) on its first day. The film collected (2.25 crore) in its first week. Its total box office collection was (3.25 crore) and the film was average on box office.

== Soundtrack ==
All music is composed by Naveed Nashad.

No.	Title	Lyrics	Singer(s)	Length
1.	"Jo Jo Janta"	Mubashir Hassan	Damia Farooq, Zain Ali, Asad Abbas, Jawed Sheikh
2.	"Lovely Dovely"		Naveed Nashad, Rose Mary, Javed Shaikh
3.	"Shukriya"		Amanat Ali, Beena Khan
4.	"Hai Naya Naya"		Asim Azhar, Afshan Fawad

== See also ==
- List of Pakistani films of 2018
