= Sanam Chaudhry =

Pakistani former actress and model (born 1991)

- صنم چوہدری
- Born: Jeddah, Saudi Arabia
- Education: University of Central Punjab
- Occupations: Actress; model
- Years active: 2012–2021
- Known for: Aasmanon Pay Likha (2013); Ghar Titli Ka Par (2017); Ab Dekh Khuda Kya Karta Hai (2018); Meer Abru (2019)
- Awards: Hum Awards

Sanam Chaudhry is a Pakistani former actress and model who had appeared in Urdu television series and films. She made her acting debut in a supporting role in Mazung De Meena Sheena (2012). Then, Sanam gained popularity and critical acclaim for her performances in Aasmanon Pay Likha (2013) and Zindagi Tujh Ko Jiya (2016). She is a Hum Awards recipient.

She made her film debut in Jackpot (2018). Sanam, also received made her appearances in successful series Ghar Titli Ka Par (2017), Ab Dekh Khuda Kya Karta Hai (2018), Haiwan (2018) and Meer Abru (2017). In August 2021, Chaudhry retired from her acting.

== Early and personal life ==
Sanam was born in Jeddah, Saudi Arabia and she received her graduation in University of Central Punjab. She has a younger sister named Zaib Chaudhry, who is also an actress. On November 27 2019, Chaudhry married singer Somee Chohan. On 5 October 2020, Chohan announced the birth of their son.

== Career ==
=== Early work and established actress (2012–2019) ===
Sanam Chaudhry made her television debut through Mazung De Meena Sheena in a supporting role. In 2013, she portrayed a rich, arrogant girl in melodramatic series Aasmanon Pay Likha alongside Sheheryar Munawar and Sajal Aly the series received critical praise. Then, she made her debut as lead actress in Bhool opposite Sarah Khan and Shehroz Sabzwari and latter she received nomination in Hum Award for Best Soap actress.

In 2014, she appeared in the romantic series Mere Meherbaan along with Ayeza Khan and Aagha Ali. Then, chaudhry portrayed as a rich affluent girl in tragedy series Tere Mere Beech with Noor Hassan Rizvi. In 2016, she played as a kind-hearted woman in Zindagi Tujh Ko Jiya opposite Furqan Qureshi, for which she won Hum Award for Best Soap actress.

Sanam became established after portraying as a cunning girl Anji in betrayal friendship series Ghar Titli Ka Par opposite Aiman Khan and Shahzad Sheikh also her performance well-received by audience and gained immense popularity. In 2018, she played as an antagonistic tomboy in Rubaru Tha Ishq opposite Danish Taimoor and Ushna Shah and portrayed as an innocent Maryam in the spiritual series Ab Dekh Khuda Kya Karta Hai alongside Humayun Ashraf and Danish Taimoor in their second collaboration after Ru Baru Ishq Tha. The series also gained more viewership from critics.

In 2018, she appeared in social awareness series Haiwaan opposite Wahaj Ali and Faysal Quraishi also, she garnered nomination for ARY Digital Social Media Drama Awards for Best Actress. Finally, she portrayed as a middle-class girl in Meer Abru along with Noor Hassan Rizvi in their third on-screen appearance and sanam's acting received positive reviews from audiences.

== Other work and media image ==
Sanam is also portrayed in various telefilms and appeared as guest in shows. In 2016, she was featured third in "Most Beautiful Faces of 2016". In 2019, chaudhry was placed in "Top 10 Pakistani Drama Actors" list for her performance in Meer Abru. In 2020, she was featured in "Most Memorable Female Characters" list for her performance in Ghar Titli Ka Par and Meer Abru.

== Filmography ==
=== TV series ===
Year	Title	Role	Network	Ref	Notes
2012	Mazung De Meena Sheena	Misha	TV One		Debut series
2013–2014	Ishq Hamari Galiyon Mein	Sitara	Hum TV		
2013–2014	Aasmanon Pay Likha	Natasha Aaliyan	Geo Entertainment		
2014	Bhool	Hira	Hum TV		Debut as lead actress
2014	Mere Meherbaan	Iraj Nazi	Hum TV		
2014–2015	Khata	Rabiya	ARY Digital		
2014–2015	Chhoti	Saira	Geo Entertainment		
2015	Nikah	Zara	Hum TV		
2015	Inteha	Aiza	Express Entertainment		
2015–2016	Tere Mere Beech	Hareem	Hum TV		
2016	Zindagi Tujh Ko Jiya	Maryam	Hum TV		
2016	Kathputli	Mehrunnisa	Hum TV		
2016	Meher Aur Meherban	Muzna	Urdu 1		
2016	Mujhe Bhi Khuda Ne Banaya Hai	Nihaal	A-Plus Entertainment		
2017	Shiza	Shiza	ARY Digital		
2017–2018	Badnaam	Minahil Afraaz Yazdani	ARY Digital		
2017–2018	Bedardi Saiyaan	Hania	Geo Entertainment		
2017–2018	Bohtan	Saba Noor	A-Plus Entertainment		
2017–2018	Ghar Titli Ka Par	Anjum Sehr (Anji)	Geo Entertainment		
2018	Rubaru Tha Ishq	Ayaan	Geo Entertainment		
2018–2019	Ab Dekh Khuda Kya Karta Hai	Maryam Naseer	Geo Entertainment		
2018–2019	Haiwaan	Momina	ARY Digital		
2018–2019	Noor Bibi	Seema	Geo Entertainment		
2019	Meer Abru	Abru Ahmed	Hum TV		

=== Telefilms and Special appearances ===
Year	Title	Role	Network	Ref	Notes
2014	Dulha Bana Bakra	Sana	Geo Entertainment		Telefilm
2014	Shareek-e-Hayat	Zara	Hum TV		Episode: "Saraab"
2016	Kitni Girhain Baaki Hain	Zubia	Hum TV		Episode: "Jhalli"
2017	Kitni Girhain Baaki Hain	Meena	Hum TV		Episode: "Taxi Driver"

=== Films ===
Year	Title	Role	Ref.	Notes
2018	Jackpot	Chandni		Debut film
2024	Ishq 2020	Sana		

== Awards and nominations ==
Year	Work	Category	Result	Ref.
Lux Style Awards
2012	—N/a	Best Model of the Year (Female)	Nominated	
2016	—N/a	Best Dressed Female	Nominated	
2019	Ghar Titli Ka Par	Best TV Actress - Viewer's Choice	Nominated	
2019	Ab Dekh Khuda Kya Karta Hai	Best TV Actress - Critics' Choice	Nominated	
Hum Awards
2015	Bhool	Best Soap Actress	Nominated	
2017	Zindagi Tujh Ko Jiya	Best Soap Actress	Won	
Pakistan Media Awards
2019	Ghar Titli Ka Par	Best Actress in Negative Role	Nominated	
ARY Digital Social Media Drama Awards
2019	Haiwan	Best Actor Female (Serial)	Nominated	
