= Jia Ali =

Pakistani actress and model

- Born: 8 September 1972 (age 53); Lahore, Punjab, Pakistan
- Education: St Mary High School
- Occupations: Actress; Model
- Years active: 1991 – present
- Spouse: Imran Idress (m. 2021)

Jia Ali (born 8 September 1972) is a Pakistani actress and model. She is known for her roles in dramas Band Khirkyon Kay Peechay, Hum Tehray Gunahgaar, Pukaar and Meer Abru.

== Early life ==
Jia was born on 8 September 1972 in Lahore, Punjab, Pakistan. During her childhood, her parents moved to Libya for work and she grew up there. She came to Pakistan in her teens and completed her studies from St Mary High School.

== Career ==
Jia started acting on PTV. After that she appeared in PTV dramas Imtehaan, Parchain, Kaghaz Kay Phool, Kabhi Kabhi Pyar Mein and Tanha. She also appeared in two seasons of drama Band Khirkyon Kay Peechay, Meer Abru, Hum Tehray Gunahgaar and Pukaar. She also appeared in movies Deewane Tere Pyar Ke, Ghar Kab Aao Gay, Love Mein Ghum and Saya e Khuda e Zuljalal.

== Personal life ==
She married Hong Kong-based cricket coach and businessman Imran Idrees in May 2021.

== Filmography ==
=== Television ===
| Year | Title | Role | Network |
|---|---|---|---|
| 1992 | A-Levels | Herself | PTV |
| 1999 | Tum Se Mil Kar | Jia | PTV |
| 2000 | Kabhi Kabhi Pyar Mein | Sabeen | PTV |
| 2003 | Umrao Jaan Ada | Dancer | Geo TV |
| 2006 | Imtehaan | Maria | PTV |
| 2006 | Main Aur Tum | Zoya | ARY Digital |
| 2007 | Qissa-e-Ulfat | Herself | Aaj Entertainment |
| 2009 | Kaghaz Kay Phool | Shehrbano | PTV |
| 2010 | Manzilain | Areej | PTV |
| 2011 | Parchain | Mehreem | PTV |
| 2012 | Cheeko Papa Aur Woh | Nunhi | PTV |
| 2012 | Tanha | Nini | PTV |
| 2013 | Band Khirkyon Kay Peechay | Tina | TV One |
| 2013 | Taar-e-Ankaboot | Taiba | Geo Entertainment |
| 2014 | Drama Na Marjaye | Gia Gi | Express Entertainment |
| 2014 | Hum Tehray Gunahgaar | Nushaba | Hum TV |
| 2015 | Mazaaq Raat | Herself | Dunya News |
| 2015 | Safar-E-Ishq | Peeno | PTV |
| 2016 | Sakeena | Zamurd | A-Plus |
| 2016 | Mazaaq Raat | Herself | Dunya News |
| 2016 | Hum Sab Ajeeb Se Hain | Bemisal | Aaj Entertainment |
| 2017 | Band Khirkyon Kay Peechay Season 2 | Tina | TV One |
| 2018 | Pukaar | Taashfeen | ARY Digital |
| 2019 | Gulfam | Parveen | ATV |
| 2019 | Meer Abru | Zebunnisa | Hum TV |
| 2019 | Dolly Darling | Love Guru | Geo Entertainment |
| 2020 | Mera Maan Rakhna | Samina | TV One |

=== Web series ===
| Year | Title | Role | Network |
|---|---|---|---|
| 2022 | Malika Encounter | Sahiban | Urduflix |

=== Telefilm ===
| Year | Title | Role |
|---|---|---|
| 2012 | Bojh | Sara |
| 2019 | Ehsas | Giya |

=== Film ===
| Year | Title | Role |
|---|---|---|
| 1997 | Deewane Tere Pyar Ke | Kiran |
| 1998 | Nakhra Gori Ka | Najima |
| 2000 | Ghar Kab Aao Gay | Naseeka |
| 2001 | Dil Deewana Hai | Rumaisa |
| 2008 | Kashf: The Lifting of the Veil | Model |
| 2011 | Love Mein Ghum | Sheza |
| 2012 | Iffat-e-Maab | Anjuman |
| 2016 | Saya e Khuda e Zuljalal | Devika Goray |
| TBA | Chaudhry – The Martyr | TBA |

== Awards and nominations ==
| Year | Award | Category | Result | Title | Ref. |
|---|---|---|---|---|---|
| 2017 | 3rd Galaxy Lollywood Awards | Best Performance in a Negative Role | Nominated | Saya e Khuda e Zuljalal | |
