= Bay Aib =

Pakistani drama television series

- Title screen
- Genre: Drama
- Written by: Qaisra Hayat
- Directed by: Ali Hassan
- Starring: Samina Peerzada; Alishba Yousuf; Noor Hassan
- Country of origin: Pakistan
- Original language: Urdu
- No. of episodes: 22

Production
- Executive producers: Dr.Ali Kazmi; Fahad Mustafa
- Production locations: Karachi, Pakistan
- Production company: BigBang Entertainment

Original release
- Network: Urdu 1
- Release: 4 August 2016 – 5 January 2017

Be Aib (Urdu: بےعیب, lit. 'Flawless') is a 2016 Pakistani drama television series aired on Urdu 1, produced by Ali Kazmi and Fahad Mustafa under their production banner Big Bang Entertainment. Be Aib is the story of a woman and her obsession with perfection, which causes turmoil in her daughter's life.

== Plot ==
Shahana and Sadaf are sisters who are married into affluent families. Sadaf is of controlling nature and judges people based on their social status. She has shrewdly arranged for her daughter Tooba to be engaged to Shahana's son Taimur knowing that he is the sole heir to Shahana and Gulrez's wealth. Safi is Shahana and Sadaf's only brother, but he is not as wealthy as his sisters are. While Shahana is warm towards Safi and his wife Aisha, Sadaf mocks Safi for his middle-class mindset. Safi has two children, Ahmed and Inaya.

Taimur meets with an accident and undergoes multiple surgeries. Later, the doctor tells Taimur's parents that Taimur may not walk again without crutches. Sadaf can't bear that her daughter will be marrying a disabled person. She decides to fix Tooba's marriage somewhere else and bars her from meeting Taimur.

Inaya marris Taimur. Sadaf arranges a meet between Tooba and a prospective groom Fawad. Fawad instantly likes Tooba and urges Sadaf to expedite the wedding. On their wedding night, Taimur tells Inaya that he can never forget Tooba. Inaya tells him that if her love for him is true, it will make a place in his heart. Tooba marries Fawad.

Meanwhile, with Inaya's encouragement, Taimur begins to walk without the walking stick. Later, Fawad meets Sarmad and apologises for keeping his first marriage a secret. Sarmad assures him of his support.

Fawad dies in an accident. Tooba is devastated, but Sadaf is impervious to Tooba's anguish. Sadaf wants to separate Inaya and Taimur. She wants Taimur to marry Tooba.

== Cast ==
- Samina Peerzada as Sadaf: Tooba's mother; Shahana and Safi's sister
- Alishba Yousuf as Tooba: Sadaf's daughter; Ahmed and Taimur's love interest
- Noor Hassan Rizvi as Taimur: Shahana's son; Tooba and Anaya's love interest
- Imran Aslam as Ahmed: Safi's son who likes Tooba
- Mariam Ansari as Anaya: Safi's daughter who likes Taimur
- Ismat Zaidi as Shahana: Taimur's mother; Sadaf and Safi's sister
- Tariq Jameel as Safi: Anaya and Ahmed's father; Shahana and Sadaf's brother
- Shehryar Zaidi as Sarmad: Tooba's father; Sadaf's husband
- Manzoor Qureshi as Gulraiz: Taimur's father; Shahana's husband
- Nida Mumtaz as Ayesha: Anaya and Ahmed's mother; Safi's wife
- Asad Zaman as Fawad: Tooba's husband
- Shazia Akhtar as Maria: Sadaf's friend
