= 3rd Hum Awards =

Award ceremony held in Dubai

- Official poster
- Date: 9 April 2015; 23 May 2015 (televised)
- Site: Dubai World Trade Centre, Dubai, UAE
- Hosted by: Hamza Ali Abbasi; Sanam Jung; Ahmad Ali Butt (co-host); Vasay Chaudhry (co-host); Sanam Saeed (co-host)
- Preshow hosts: Mohsin Abbas Haider; Anoushey Ashraf
- Produced by: Maimona Siddiqui
- Directed by: Nazeer Saeed Janjua

Highlights
- Best Drama Serial (Jury): Bunty I Love You
- Best Drama Serial (Popular): Sadqay Tumhare
- Most awards: Sadqay Tumhare (10)
- Most nominations: Sadqay Tumhare (15)

Television coverage
- Network: Hum
- Duration: 3 hours, 20 minutes
- Ratings: 4.9 TRPs

The 3rd Hum Awards ceremony, presented by the Hum Television Network and Entertainment Channel (HTNEC), sponsored by Servis and Telenor, honored the best in fashion, music and Hum Television Dramas of 2014 and took place on 9 April 2015, at the Dubai World Trade Centre, Dubai, UAE at 8:30 p.m. UAE Standard Time and was televised on 23 May at 7:30 p.m. PST. During the ceremony, HTNEC presented Hum Awards in 25 categories along with 3 in honorary and 2 in special categories. The ceremony, televised in Pakistan by Hum TV, was produced and directed by Nazeer Saeed Janjua while executive produced by Maimona Siddiqui.

Hamza Ali Abbasi and Sanam Jung hosted the ceremony along with Vasay Chaudhry and Ahmad Ali Butt. Hamza and Ahmad hosted the ceremony for the first time, while for the third year in a row, Jung and Vasay returned as host and co-host for the ceremony, respectively. During the ceremony, Hum also held its annual Honorary Awards, which were presented by host Sanam Saeed. For the first time since its inception, the ceremony was held in Dubai because of Hum Network's completion of a 10 years and its global success. Atiqa Odho served as the first brand ambassador of ceremony.

Bunty I Love You won two awards including Best Drama Serial - Jury and Best Actress - Jury by Saba Qamar. Sadqay Tumhare won the most awards with ten including Best Drama Serial - Popular and Best Director Drama Serial for Ehteshamuddin. Other winners included Susraal Mera with three, Muhabbat Subha Ka Sitara Hai and Mausam also with two awards and Hum Tehray Gunahgaar, Uff Meri Family, and Main Kukkoo Aur Woh with one apiece.

== Winners and nominees ==
The nominees for public voting were announced on 9 March 2015, on ceremony website. Only seven categories were set open for public voting in Viewers Choice Categories with three categories from Television and two categories from Fashion and Music segments. Voting lines were closed on 25 March 2015 for all the viewers choice categories, announcing the rest of the categories. While on 2 April 2015 the rest of nominations were announced. Sadqay Tumhare received the most nominations with fifteen total and Muhabbat Subha Ka Sitara Hai came in second with twelve.

The winners were announced during the awards ceremony on 9 April 2015. Momina Duraid consecutively won third time and total of four Best Drama Serial awards as a producer. For the first time since the first ceremony, all the four acting awards went to different dramas. Sadqay Tumhare and Bunty I Love You became the only dramas that were nominated before the completion of their broadcast, ultimately winning Best Drama serial - Popular and Best Drama Serial - Jury respectively.^{[A]} For the third in a row ceremony had a tie with the respective wins of Danish Taimoor and Imran Aslam for Hum Tehray Gunahgaar and Susraal Mera respectively in Best Soap Actor category. Khalil-ur-Rehman Qamar became the first male person to win the Best Writer Drama Serial award. Momina Duraid with four, Mahira Khan, and Samiya Mumtaz and Adnan Malik, with two each, were the only individuals to win multiple trophies.

Winners are listed first and highlighted in boldface.

=== Television ===
Jury Choice Categories
**Best Drama Serial**: **Bunty I Love You – Momina Duraid (MD Productions) and Humayun Saeed**; Sadqay Tumhare – Momina Duraid, Samina Humayun Saeed and Tariq Ahmed Shah; Digest Writer – Kashif Nisar and Qaisar Ali (Larachi Entertainment); Mausam – Momina Duraid (MD Productions); Mere Meherbaan – Asad Qureshi and Abdullah Kadwani (7th Sky Entertainment); Muhabbat Subha Ka Sitara Hai – Momina Duraid (MD Productions); Shanakht – Amna Nawaz Khan (ANK Production)	**Best Director Drama Serial**: **Ehteshamuddin – Sadqay Tumhare**; Sakina Samo – Muhabbat Subha Ka Sitara Hai; Syed Ahmed Kamran – Digest Writer; Siraj-ul-Haq – Bunty I Love You; Amna Nawaz Khan – Shanakht; Haseeb Hassan – Aahista Aahista; Farooq Rind – Mere Meherbaan
**Best Actor**: **Ahsan Khan – Mausam as Hashir**; Meekal Zulfiqar – Muhabbat Subha Ka Sitara Hai as Nabeel; Adnan Malik – Sadqay Tumhare as Khalil; Adnan Siddiqui – Aahista Aahista as Zawar; Ali Rehman Khan – Muhabbat Ab Nahi Hugi as Azir; Adeel Hussain – Muhabbat Subha Ka Sitara Hai as Zeeshan	**Best Actress**: **Saba Qamar – Bunty I Love You as Dania**; Mahira Khan – Sadqay Tumhare as Rukhsana / Shano; Saba Qamar – Digest Writer as Fareeda / Rashk-e-Hina; Sanam Jung – Muhabbat Subha Ka Sitara Hai as Romaisa; Ayesha Khan – Mehram as Iqra; Ayeza Khan – Mere Meherbaan as Haya; Maya Ali – Shanakht as Qurrat-ul-Ain / Annie
**Best Supporting Actor**: **Rehan Sheikh – Sadqay Tumhare as Mohammad Amin Janjua**; Khalid Malik – Laa as Dilawar Shah; Fahad Mirza – Shanakht as Rohaan; Junaid Khan – Firaaq; Abid Ali – Bunty I Love You as Patel	**Best Supporting Actress**: **Mansha Pasha – Muhabbat Subha Ka Sitara Hai**; Sabreen Hisbani – Laa; Maheen Khalid – Digest Writer as Jameela; Neelam Muneer – Mere Meherbaan as Muskaan Nazir; Saniya Shamshad – Sadqay Tumhare as Humaira Batool
**Best Soap Actor**: **Danish Taimoor – Hum Tehray Gunahgaar**; **Imran Aslam – Susraal Mera as Adil**; Shehroz Sabzwari – Bhool as Nadia's father; Hassan Ahmed – Agar Tum Na Hotay	**Best Soap Actress**: **Zarnish Khan – Susraal Mera as Aliza**; Ushna Shah – Hum Tehray Gunahgaar; Sanam Chaudhry – Bhool as Hira; Sania Shamshad – Agar Tum Na Hotay as Sania
**Best Comic Sitcom**: **Uff Meri Family – M&M Productions**; Dramay Baziyan – Manahil Productions; Rangeelay – Showcase Communications; Joru Ka Ghulam – MIF Productions	**Best Soap Series**: **Susraal Mera – MD Productions**; Agar Tum Na Hotay – Mushroom Productions; Hum Tehray Gunahgaar – MD Productions; Bhool – MD Productions
**Best Writer Drama Serial**: **Khalil Ur Rehman – Sadqay Tumhare**; Umera Ahmad – Muhabbat Subha Ka Sitara Hai; Maha Malik – Mere Meherbaan; Aliya Bukhari – Mausam; Amna Nawaz Khan – Shanakht	**Best Television Film**: **Main Kukkoo Aur woh – Showcase Communications**; Thora Piyar, Ziada Love – Angelic Films; Daag Daman Ka – Cinematic Media; Percham Muhabbat Ka – MD Productions; Sentimental – Promax Media
**Best Television Sensation Male**: **Adnan Malik – Sadqay Tumhare** as Khalil	**Best Television Sensation Female**: **Hareem Farooq – Mausam** as Saman
**Best Actor in a Negative Role**: **Samiya Mumtaz – Sadqay Tumhare as Rasheeda**; Farah Shah – Muhabbat Subha Ka Sitara Hai as Romaisa's Khala; Yumna Zaidi – Mausam as Shazia; Uzma Gillani – Firaaq as Maa Jee; Armeena Rana Khan – Muhabbat Ab Nahi Hugi as Fiza	**Best Actor in a Impactful Character**: **Samiya Mumtaz – Sadqay Tumhare as Rasheeda**; Sania Shamshad – Main Dewaani as Hadia; Saba Qamar – Bunty I Love You as Dania
**Best Onscreen Couple**: **Mahira Khan and Adnan Malik – Sadqay Tumhare**	**Best Original Soundtrack**: **"Haey Re Hum Sadqay Tumhare" from Sadqay Tumhare – Performed by Rahat Fateh Ali Khan**; "Rabba Mere Haal Da" from Digest Writer – Performed by Shafqat Ali Khan; "Hai Ishq Ki Pehli Manzil Laa" from Laa – Performed by Javed Bashir; "Na mehram, Humsafar" from Mehram – Performed by Sara Raza Khan; "Mein Deewani" from Main Dewani – Performed by Fariha Pervez
Viewers Choice Categories
**Best Drama Serial Popular**: **Sadqay Tumhare – Momina Duraid, Samina Humayun Saeed and Tariq Ahmed Shah**; Bunty I Love You – Momina Duraid (MD Productions) and Humayun Saeed; Digest Writer – Kashif Nisar and Qaisar Ali (Larachi Entertainment); Mausam – Momina Duraid (MD Productions); Mere Meherbaan – Asad Qureshi and Abdullah Kadwani (7th Sky Entertainment); Muhabbat Subha Ka Sitara Hai – Momina Duraid (MD Productions); Shanakht – Amna Nawaz Khan (Amna Nawaz Khan)
**Best Actor Popular**: **Meekal Zulfiqar – Muhabbat Subha Ka Sitara Hai as Nabeel**; Adnan Malik – Sadqay Tumhare as Khalil; Ahsan Khan – Mausam as Hashir; Adnan Siddiqui – Aahista Aahista as Zawar; Ali Rehman Khan – Muhabbat Ab Nahi Hugi as Azir; Adeel Hussain – Muhabbat Subha Ka Sitara Hai as Zeeshan	**Best Actress Popular**: **Mahira Khan – Sadqay Tumhare as Rukhsana / Shano**; Saba Qamar – Bunty I Love You as Dania; Saba Qamar – Digest Writer as Fareeda / Rashk-e-Hina; Sanam Jung – Muhabbat Subha Ka Sitara Hai as Romaisa; Ayesha Khan – Mehram as Iqra; Ayeza Khan – Mere Meherbaan as Haya; Maya Ali – Shanakht as Qurrat-ul-Ain / Annie

=== Music ===
Viewers Choice Categories
**Best Music Single**: **"Roiyaan" – Farhan Saeed**; "Shikva" – Faakhir; "Ghalti Mein Shta" – Naseer & Shahab; "Meena" – The Sketches; "Nimmi Nimmi" – Overload	**Best Music Video**: **Shahab Qamar – "Ghalti Mein Shta"**; Yasir Jaswal – "Roiyaan"; Haroon & Ghaffar – "Meena"; Adnan Kandhar – "Shikva"; Adnan Malik – "Phir Milli Tanhai"

=== Fashion ===
Viewers Choice Categories
**Best Model Male**: **Shahzad Noor**; Jahan-e-Khalid; Hasnain Lehri; Rizwan Jaffri; Omer Shahzad	**Best Model Female**: **Cybil Chaudhry**; Amna Babar; Fouzia Aman; Nooray Bhatti; Sabeeka Imam

=== Honorary Hum Awards ===
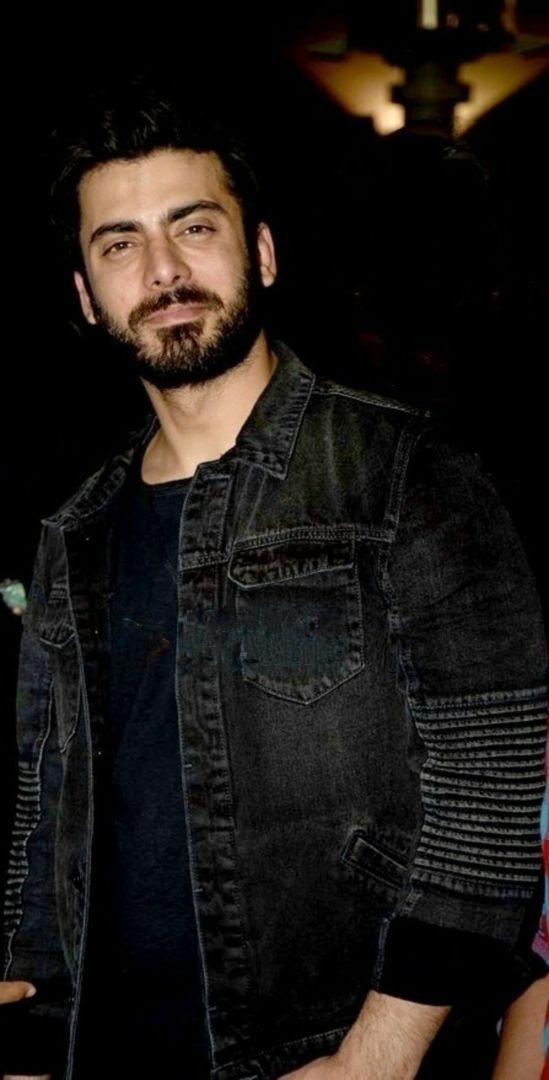
Fawad Khan, International Icon Award winner

Hosted by Sanam Saeed, Hum presented following annual honorary awards during the ceremony:

Lifetime Achievement Award

- Anwar Maqsood

Hum Honorary Award in Music

- Abida Parveen

Hum Honorary Award in Television

- Samina Peerzada

International Icon of the Year

- Fawad Khan

Hum Honorary Special Recognition

- Nabeel Qureshi and Fizza Ali Meerza - Na Maloom Afraad

=== Dramas with multiple nominations and awards ===
The following 17 Dramas received multiple nominations:

Nominations	Drama
15	Sadqay Tumhare
12	Muhabbat Subha Ka Sitara Hai
7	Bunty I Love You
7	Digest Writer
7	Mere Meherbaan
7	Mausam
6	Shanakht
3	Aahista Aahista
3	Laa
3	Susraal Mera
3	Hum Tehray Gunahgaar
3	Bhool
3	Agar Tum Na Hotay
2	Mehram
2	Firaaq
2	Main Deewani
2	Muhabbat Ab Nahi Hugi

The following Five dramas received multiple awards:

Awards	Drama
10	Sadqay Tumhare
3	Susraal Mera
2	Bunty I Love You
2	Muhabbat Subha Ka Sitara Hai
2	Mausam

== Presenters and performers ==
The following individuals, listed in order of appearance, presented awards or performed musical numbers.

=== Presenters ===
Name(s)	Presented
Asif Abdul Majeed (Pres. Rivo Mobile); Mawra Hocane	Presenters of the award of Best Model Female - Popular
Hannan Asif (DOS & MKTG Rivo Mobile); Hareem Farooq	Presenters of the award of Best Model Male - Popular
Junaid Khan; Ayesha Omar	Presenters of the Award of Best Single & Best Music Video.
Duraid Qureshi (CEO Hum Network Limited); Irfan Wahab Khan (Mark. Officer Telenor)	Special mention for the global success of Network's 10 years of excellence and its achievements and Presenters of the award of Honorary Excellence Award in Music
Adnan Malik; Maya Ali	Presenter of the award of Hum Short Films Middle East & Best Sitcom
Sarwar Khan; Hina Khawaja Bayat	Presenters of the awards of Hum Best Soap Actor - Female
Ali Rehman Khan; Rizwana Jafar (CEO Holiday Inn.)	Presenters of the awards of Hum Best Soap Actor - Male
Deepak Perwani; Shabna Naaz	Presenters of the award of Best Soap Series
Hassan Sheheryar Yasin; Saima Ajram	Presenters of the Award of Best Original Soundtrack Popular
Javed Sheikh	Presenter of the Award of Hum Honorary Excellence Award in Television given by Javed Sheikh.
Samina Peerzada	Presenter of the award of Special recognition to 2014 Highest grossing Pakistani film Na Maloom Afraad.
Aijaz Aslam; Nabeela	Presenters of the award of Best Telefilm
Naveed Asghar (Mark. HBL); Urwa Hocane	Presenters of the award of Best Television Sensation - Female
Irfan Wahab Khan (Mark. Officer Telenor); Armeena Khan	Presenters of the award of Best Television Sensation - Male
Mr. Faik (Head Payment Services HBL); Ayesha Khan	Presenters of the award of Best Supporting Actress & Best Supporting Actor
Hassan Khalid (Comm. & trade mark. Servis); Momina Duraid	Presenters of the International Icon Award
M. Sarwar Khan; Sultana Siddiqui	Presented Lifetime Achievement Award
Behroze Sabzwari; Rubina Ashraf	Presenters of the award of Best Actor in a Negative Role
Mahira Khan	Presenters of the award of Most Impactful Character
Noor ul Huda Shah	Presenter of the Award of Best Writer Drama Serial
Adnan Siddiqui; Misbah Khalid	Presenters of the Award of Best Director Drama Serial
Faisal Qureshi; Maria Wasti	Presenters of the Award of Best Onscreen Couple & Best Drama Serial Viewers Choice/Popular
Farooq Hiader Sheikh (GM. mark. Servis); Sakina Samo	Presenters of the Award of Best Actor Female - Popular
Ahmad Hussain (Dir. corp. Servis); Atiqa Odho	Presenters of the Award of Best Actor Male - Popular
Meekal Zulfiqar	Presenter of the Award of Best Drama Serial - Jury
Aman Aziz Siddiqui (Head-Corporate Strategy & Investments-HBL)	Special mention and bouquet for acknowledgement of Sultana Siddiqui work for media Industry.
Humayun Saeed; Aman Aziz Siddiqui (Head-Corporate Strategy & Investments-HBL)	Presenters of the Award of Best Actor Female - Jury
Mr. Waqas (Dir. Mark. Unilever); Bushra Ansari	Presenters of the Award of Best Actor Male -Jury

=== Performers ===
Name(s)	Role	Performed
Mardi Gras Performers of Rio	Performers	Ceremony's opening number by Mardi Gras Performers a Brazilian Carnival festive dancing performance.
Feroz Khan; Sajjal Ali	Performers	"Saturday Saturday" from Humpty Sharma Ki Dulhania and "Yaar Naa Miley" from Kick and a duet number on "Drama Queen" from Hasee Toh Phasee.
Ahmad Ali Butt; Vasay Chaudhry	Performers	"'Hum' Jaisa Koi Nahee" during the second hosting segment of ceremony.
Ahsan Khan; Saba Qamar	Performer	Duet on "Manwa Lagay" from Happy New Year and "Aaja Piya Ke Bazar Mein" from Humshakals, while Khan performed individually on "Tu Meri Hone Lagi" from Bang Bang!.
Sunidhi Chauhan	Performer	"Ishq Sufiyana" from The Dirty Picture, "Dil Dharke Main Tum Se" from Anjuman, "Sajna Ve Sajna" from Chameli and "Udi Tere Aankhoin Se" from Guzaarish.
Mehwish Hayat	Performer	"Billi" from Na Maloom Afraad, "Lovely" from Happy New Year and "Ban Bang" from Bang Bang!.
Shahroz Sabzwari; Syra Yousuf	Performers	"Bismil Bismil" from Haider and "Chittiyaan Kalaiyaan" from Roy and duet on "Madamiyan" from Tevar.

== Ceremony information ==
With two successful years of previous year ceremonies which garnered the channel critical and positive reception, the Hum rehired producer and director Nazeer Saeed Janjua for the third consecutive year. In February 2015, the Hum actors Hamza Ali Abbasi and sanam Jung were chosen as host for 2015 gala. While hosts Vasay Chaudhry and Ahmad Ali Butt were hired for co-hosting the ceremony, with Sanam Saeed as a host of Hum Honorary Awards. Jung returned for third time to host the ceremony, who previously co-hosted the Hum Awards in 2012 and 2013. Vasay also marked his third entrance as a co-host and writer of ceremony. Actors Hamza and Butt hosted the ceremony for the first time.

Special half-hour programs of making ceremony and rehearsals were broadcast and televised simultaneously Television personality Anoushey Ashraf returned to host the shows with Mohsin Abbas Haider who hosted the programs for the first time. During the programs, host usually interacts with the actors and management team working behind the curtain, revealing their efforts and work. Also the rehearsals, production design, art design, set decoration and several others managements are shown. On 3 April 2015, Hum organised the pre-awards part for all the nominees.

Several other people were also involved with the production of the ceremony. Rehan Ahmed and Fahad Buksh served as a directors of Red Carpet and Making of ceremony. Production 021 returned to design a new set and stage design for the show with Saad Qazi and Nasir Jamal holding the operations in Dubai. Make-up and styling was done by the Nabeela of N-pro. Performances were choreographed by BNF Dance & Entertainment. During the ceremony a special award was presented to Fawad Khan for his contribution to cinema.

=== Broadcast, venue and voting of ceremony ===
Hum Network organized the event off-air on 9 April 2015 and premiered on Hum TV on 23 and 24 May 2015 as Part I and Part II respectively. The ceremony was televised again on 25 July 2015. Hum Television Network and Entertainment Channel organize the third year ceremony in Dubai at World Trade Center as a part of Network's ten years success and global achievements. At press release Atiqa Odho the brand ambassador of ceremony said; "It’s a proud moment for all of us... Our Pakistani dramas have stayed honest to our culture and are close to reality. Lots of people, even if they don’t live in Pakistan, feel a cultural connect. They feel that it could be a story of their homes ... After all, our family values are the same. We are extremely brave when it comes to our content. We don’t show you just glamour. We will put up a mirror and show you reality." Seven Viewers Choice categories from Television, Music and Fashion were opened for voting on ceremony website and were announced on the basis of highest public votes given to an individual in each category. Jury choice categories were completely based on the Hum membership's voting as a whole.

=== The Best Short Film / Video Category, Middle East ===
Since the ceremony's host country held as Dubai, Hum Network announced a special category for the filmmakers working in Middle East. During the ceremony Hum Network and Entertainment channel presented The Best Short Film - Middle East award. Nominations were made on the basis of Short Films submitted online to Hum TV by directors themselves. Six short films were listed as final nominee for the category, namely, Faraz Waqar for 9:11 am Oliver Obaid for All in time, Mustafa Abbas for Sunset State, Tanveer Syed for Toast to a Ghost, Tabarak Rizvi for Faded and Farhan Abbas for Thora Sa Waqt with Abu Dhabi-based Pakistani filmmaker Faraz Waqar won the award for the Best Short Film 9:11 am. Faraz submitted three short films for the nominations including 9:11 am and critically acclaimed Pakistan's first silent film Meeoww Billi Aur World War 3 and Imagineer who was a tribute to Nations' pop singer Nazia Hassan. However 9:11 am got selected and ultimately won the award. The film was the graduation thesis project of director made in 2012.

=== Special, newly awarded and not-awarded categories ===
Following the previous year ceremony Hum TV presented Hum Honorary Special Recognition Award to producer Fizza Ali Meerza and Nabeel Qureshi for their film Na Maloom Afraad, a joint production of Hum Films and Filmwala Pictures for its box office and commercial success. Special Launch and screening of Momina Duraid's film Bin Roye was also held. Which is the first own production of channels subsidiary Hum Films. In award categories, Hum Award for Best Designer Menswear, Hum Award for Best Designer Womenswear, Hum Award for Best Solo Artist and Best Onscreen Couple Popular were not awarded, while categories Best Drama Series, Best Television Host and Best Comic Actor were not awarded after being presented at first ceremony, but their discontinuation is yet to be confirmed. However, only one category, Best Music Single was introduced at the ceremony in music section.

=== Critical reception ===
The show received a mixed reception from media publications. Most media outlets overseen the ceremony as a positive step in encouraging talent in Pakistan and praised it progress and achievements in a time period of just three years. Media Poondi wrote that, "For an award ceremony to cross the international border in its 3rd year where many other award shows of this age struggle with teething issues was a mammoth task which HUM Network was able to pull off owing to its worldwide popularity." Hamna Zubair of Dawn.com commented, "the event held the promise of being a real entertainer, which it fulfilled". Despite the ceremony started two and half-hours late, she explained that, "It was well organised, with only a few moments where someone would walk on to the stage a bit late, or a microphone would stop working for a few seconds. Once the show began, it ran smoothly."

Emanuel Sarfraz from The Nation also lauded the ceremony by saying, "The event also marked the 10th Anniversary of HUM Network. The honour goes to HUM for holding first awards of a Pakistani TV channel to be held outside the country. It must have been a mammoth task which it was able to pull off owing to its worldwide popularity. It was one of the most organised events that this scribe has seen. Hats off to team HUM." The writer and reviewer Sadaf Haider of Dawn News also favored the Hum Awards commenting, "this year's HUM TV awards, aired in full on the TV channel this weekend, showed an unprecedented level of organization and high production values from dances to lighting and sets." but she slated the length of ceremony and compared Lux Style Awards and ARY Film Awards with the event. She concluded with remarking that, "overall, the HUM TV awards made for great viewing and will probably only improve with time."

== See also ==
- 14th Lux Style Awards

== Notes ==
- A: When the nominations were announced Digest Writer and Sadqay Tumharay were still airing on TV and completed their broadcast on 14 March – 10 April 2015 respectively. The serials eventually became the most awarded drama serials of the ceremony.
