= Noor Hassan Rizvi =

Pakistani model, actor and director (born 1986)

- نور حسن رضوی
- Born: 16 May 1986 (age 40); Tripoli, Libya
- Occupations: Model, Actor, Host

Noor Hassan Rizvi (Urdu: نور حسن رضوی) is a Pakistani model, television actor and host. He is best known for his roles as Khizar Alam in Humsafar, Shahaab in Aseerzadi, Meer Murad in Meer Abru and Hunaid Ikhtiyar Shah in Noor Jahan.

== Career ==
Rizvi started off his career as a television host and video-jockey, with his shows airing on ATV and the state-owned television channel PTV Home. After receiving recognition, he turned to acting and appeared in dramas Mera Pehla Vote, and Judai Maar Deti Hai.

In 2010, his portrayal as antagonist, Khizar Alam in Hum TV classic Humsafar helped him gain recognition and he started getting roles for private-owned channels, ARY Digital and Hum TV. In 2013, he appeared as Sahabuddin in Aseerzadi.

In 2014, he portrayed a contemporary and broad-minded individual opposite Maya Ali in Shanakht. He also hosted the red carpet and behind the scenes of 1st Hum Awards in the same year.

Muqaddas is also one of Hassan's dramas where is he best known as Aatir.

Rizvi made his Lollywood film debut in Shoaib Khan's 2018 film 'Jackpot' where he played the male protagonist opposite Sanam Chaudhry. Chaudhary and Rizvi's later starred in a drama together in 2019, titled Meer Abru, which did not receive recognition in its year of release but during COVID-19 pandemic was watched by million of viewers on YouTube, mainly from South Asia. In the same year, he appeared on Geo Entertainment with Tu Mera Junoon opposite Kinza Hashmi, marking it his second appearance on the network after Ladies Park.

== Filmography ==
=== Film ===
Year	Film	Role	Notes
2018	Jackpot	Lucky	Debut Film
2024	Aik Anaar Do Beemar	Professor Baqi	Television film

=== Television ===
Year	Drama	Role	Note
2010	Judai Maar Daiti Hai		
2011	Ladies Park	Sameer	
2011	Daasi		
2012	Maat	Hadeed	
2012	Humsafar	Khizar	
2012	Kitni Girhain Baaki Hain		
2012	Aik Haath Ki Taali		
2012	Mah-e-Tamaam		
2012	Watan Kahaani		
2013	Kuch Iss Tarha		
2013	Aseerzadi	Shahabuddin	
2014	Shanakht	Hashim	
2014	Firaaq	Rumi	
2014	Gar Maan Reh Jaaye	Farooq	
2015	Dil Ka Kia Rung Karun	Daniyal	
2015	Muqaddas	Atir	
2015	Tumhare Siwa	Arsal	
2015	Tere Mere Beech	Ali	
2015	Abro	Ali Zafar	
2016	Dil Tere Naam	Mikaal	
2016	Kisay Chahoon	Hamza	
2016	Socha Na Tha	Zika	
2016	Bay Aib	Taimur	
2016	Bay Khudi	Saad (Sid)	
2017	Pagli	Khalid	
2017	Amanat	Sarosh	
2018	Ishq Na Kariyo Koi	Faisal	
2018	Kasak Rahay Ge	Daniyal	
2019	Meer Abru	Meer	
2019	Hasad	Farhan	
2019	Tu Mera Junoon	Salaar	
2021	Ahl-e-Wafa	Wajdan	
2021	Benaam	Haider	
2021	Sila-e-Mohabbat	Tabrez	
2022	Yeh Na Thi Hamari Qismat	Yasir	
2022	Bikhray Hain Hum	Sarim	
2024	Noor Jahan	Hunaid Ikhtiyar Shah	

=== As a Host/VJ ===
- Channel 3 Live Transmission (Live) (Ch3)
- Most Wanted (Live) (ATV)
- Weekend with Hassan (Recorded) (PTV)
- Music Masti (Recorded) (PTV)
- Boom On Live (Live) (ATV)
- On Campus (Recorded) (The Musik)
- The IQ Show (Recorded) (The Musik)

He also hosted 1st Hum Awards red carpet and its making with his co-host Sohai Ali Abro.

== Awards and nominations ==
Year	Ceremony	Category	Project	Result	Reference
2009	1st ATV Public Awards	Best VJ	Boom on Live	Won	
2010	1st Pakistan Media Awards	Best Supporting Actor	Humsafar	Nominated	
2013	2nd Hum Awards	Best Supporting Actor	Aseerzadi	Nominated	
2014	13th Lux Style Awards	Best TV Actor (Terrestrial)	Kuch Is Tarah	Nominated	
2016	15th Lux Style Awards	Best TV Actor	Muqaddas	Nominated	

== See also ==
- List of Pakistani actors
- List of people from Lahore
