= Eshita Syed =

Pakistani model and actor

- Born: Ishita Mehboob Syed; Karachi
- Occupations: Actress, model

Eshita Syed (Urdu: اشیتا محبوب سید) is a Pakistani model, TV and film actress.

== Early life ==
Syed was raised in Karachi. Her parents were ethnically Bengali. She has acted in different serials on Geo TV, ARY Digital and Hum TV. Syed started her career as a model and later appeared in a music video 'Suno Ke Main Hun Jawan' by Noori, by which she started her career in the showbiz. She is best known for doing supporting roles in Urdu drama series Mannchalay, Aik Nayee Cinderella, Sanjha, Aseerzadi and Dayar-e-Dil. She will make her comeback with drama series Sila.

== Filmography ==
Eshita Syed joined the entertainment industry as a model at a very young age. She has done modeling for many trendy brands in Pakistan. Eshita Syed started her career with the music video for the song ‘Suno Ke Main Hun Jawan’ by Noori band which was released in 2003. Eshita came into the public eye through this video, after which resulted in many modeling offers. Eshita has done many photo shoots as a model and she often appears on the covers of famous fashion magazines such as Libaas. She has also worked in many TV commercials. After working as a model successfully for many years in the Pakistan fashion industry Eshita made her acting debut on the small screen in 2012 with the TV serial ‘Aik Nayee Cindrella’ on Geo TV. Eshita played a negative role in this serial and amazed audience with her skilled acting. She has numerous drama such as Aseerzadi as Yasmeen, Bharday Jholi, Dayar-e-Dil as Laila, Khatti Meethi Zindagi, Kis Din Mera Viyah Howay Ga season 3, Kissey Apna Kahein as Iqra, Kitni Girhain Baqi Hain, Kitni Girhain Baqi Hain (Khushi Kay Rang), Mannchalay, Mar Jaen Bhi To Kya, Mere Khuda as Nadia, Meri Jaan, Omer Dadi Aur Gharwale, Sanjha and Sharek-e-Hayat, Zindagi Tujh Ko Jiya as Samra.

=== Television ===
- Aik Nayee Cinderella as Zainee
- Khatti Meethi Zindagi
- Kitni Girhain Baqi Hain
- Omar Dadi aur Gharwalay
- Kitni Girhain Baqi Hain (Khushi Kay Rang)
- Mannchalay
- Mar Jaen Bhi To Kya
- Sanjha
- Meri Jaan
- Aseerzadi as Yasmeen
- Kis Din Mera Viyah Howay Ga season 3
- Sharek-e-Hayat (Episode 4)
- Bharday Jholi
- Kissey Apna Kahein as Iqra
- Mere Khuda as Nadia
- Dayar-e-Dil as Laila
- Zindagi Tujh Ko Jiya as Samra
- dil dard Dhuan ARY Digital
- Morr Us Gali ka ARY Digital
- Raastey Dil Ke TV One
- larkiyan Mohalley ki Hum TV
- Meri Jaan Hum TV
- Najiah Hum TV
- Ek Mohabbat Kafi Hai Bol TV
- 100 din ki Kahani
- Bhar de Jholi ARY digital

=== Films ===
Year	Movie	Role	Notes	Ref
2015	Karachi se Lahore	Ayesha	Debut	
2015	Moor	Arzo		
