= Ishq 2020 =

- Teaser Poster
- Directed by: Najaf Bilgrami
- Written by: Asma Nabeel, Ahsan Raza
- Produced by: M.Khalid Ali
- Starring: Sanam Chaudhry; Mariam Ansari; Muneeb Butt; Furqan Qureshi
- Production company: Crew Motion Pictures/DDF films
- Country: Pakistan
- Language: Urdu

Ishq 2020 (Urdu: عشق ٹونٹی ٹونٹی) is an unreleased Pakistani romantic comedy film directed by Najaf Bilgrami, produced by M.Khalid Ali and written by Asma Nabeel under the production of Crew Motion Pictures. The film stars Sanam Chaudhry, Mariam Ansari, Muneeb Butt and Furqan Qureshi in lead roles.

== Cast ==
- Muneeb Butt
- Sanam Chaudhry
- Mariam Ansari
- Altaf Hussain
- Komal Aziz Khan
- Furqan Qureshi
- Nayyer Ejaz
- aftab iqbal

== Release ==
The film was scheduled for release in 2016.

== Production ==
Sajal Aly was initially cast for the lead role in the movie but due to her ongoing projects, the actress had to give up the project.
