= Ru Baru Ishq Tha =

- Title card of serial
- Genre: Serial drama Romantic serial
- Created by: TNI Productions
- Developed by: TNI Productions
- Written by: Amber Azhar
- Screenplay by: Amber Azhar
- Directed by: Furqan Khan
- Starring: Danish Taimoor; Ushna Shah; Sanam Chaudhry
- Opening theme: Singer: Nabeel Shaukat Ali
- Country of origin: Pakistan
- Original language: Urdu
- No. of seasons: 1
- No. of episodes: 26

Production
- Producer: Zeeshan Khan
- Production location: Pakistan
- Camera setup: Multi-camera setup
- Production company: TNI Communication

Original release
- Network: Geo Entertainment
- Release: 22 June – 23 November 2018

Related
- Aik Thi Raniya; Noor Bibi

Ru Baru Ishq Tha (Urdu: رو برو عشق تھا, lit. 'In Company of Love'), is a Pakistani romantic TV serial, directed by Furqan Khan and written by Amber Azhar under production house of TNI Productions. It stars Danish Taimoor, Ushna Shah and Sanam Chaudhry. It began airing on 22 June 2018 on Geo Entertainment.

It marks the return of Sanam Chaudhry and Ali Abbas after their hit serial Ghar Titli Ka Par.The show was initially titled Aatish-e-Ishq. It included actors Javed Shaikh and Ayub Khoso.

== Cast ==
- Ushna Shah as Salwa
- Danish Taimoor as Almir
- Sanam Chaudhry as Ayaan
- Ali Abbas as Wahaj
- Javed Shaikh as Murad
- Ayub Khoso as Iftikhar
- Rubina Ashraf as Riffat Ara
- Seemi Pasha as Aaliya
- Najia Baig as Uzma
- Agha Talal as Fawad
- Sana Humayun as Anusha
- Imran Patel
- Awais Waseer as Sherdil
- Fahima Awan as Hamna
- Hamza Khan
- Shazia Qaiser as Safia
- Musarrat Khan

== Songs ==
Ru Baru Ishq Tha Official original soundtrack is sung by Nabeel Shaukat Ali, The music was composed by Waqar. (lyrics)
