= Mariam Ansari =

Pakistani actress

- Occupation: Actress
- Years active: 2013–present
- Spouse: Owais Khan (m. 2021)
- Children: 1
- Relatives: Ali Ansari (brother); Moin Khan (father-in-law); Azam Khan (brother-in-law); Saboor Aly (sister-in-law)

Mariam Ansari is a Pakistani actress. She is known for her appearance in several critically acclaimed television serials including Bunty I Love You, Mubarak Ho Beti Hui Hai and Aangan. She has also appeared in films Halla Gulla, Maalik and Azaadi.

== Personal life ==
Ansari is married to Owais Khan, who is a son of former cricket captain Moin Khan. In July 2023, they had a daughter, Amaya Khan.

Her brother Ali Ansari is also an actor while her brother-in-law Azam Khan is a cricketer.

== Filmography ==
=== Theatre ===
- Cinderjutt (2013)

=== Film ===
- Ishq 2020 (unreleased)
- Halla Gulla (2015)
- Maalik (2016)
- Azaadi (2018)
- Qulfee (2025)

=== Television ===
Year	Title	Role	Notes
2014	Bunty I Love You	Salma	
2014	Aik Pal		
2014	Shanakht	Zubia Bilal	
2014	Agar Tum Na Hotay		
2015	Takkabur	Masooma	
2015	Susraal Mera	Nimra (Nimi)	
2015–2016	Tere Mere Beech	Nadia	Lead Role
2016	Ab Kar Meri Rafugari	Zoofishan	
2016	Bay Aib	Anaya	
2016–2017	Dil Lagi	Mishal	
2017	Mubarak Ho Beti Hui Hai		
2017–2018	Aangan	Saadan's girlfriend and wife	
2018–2019	Qaid	Farah	
2018–2019	Romeo Weds Heer	Soni	
2019	Bharam	Warda Waheed	Lead Role
2021	Faryaad	Malika	
2021	Mujhay Vida Kar	Masooma	
