= Ghalti Mein Shta =

- Featuring artist Nasseer Afridi.

Single by Naseer & Shahab
- Released: August 23, 2014
- Recorded: 2014
- Genre: Rock; Pakistani
- Length: 6:18
- Songwriter: Naseer Afridi
- Producer: Naseer & Shahab

Naseer & Shahab singles chronology
"Pakistan" (2013)	"Ghalti Mein Shta" (2014)	"Born a Dead Man" (2015)

Music video
- "Ghalti Mein Shta" on YouTube

"Ghalti Mein Shta" (Pashto: غلطي خه ښټه ; lit. The Fault is Mine) is a 2014 Pashtu language single by Pakistani Soft Alternative rock band Naseer & Shahab. It was released on August 23, 2014 as a digital download. It is a soulful Pashtu love-inspired ballad that depicts the female protagonist remembers her lover who is lost long, she visits his grave hoping one day she will see him. The song is written and composed by Naseer Afridi while directed, produced and co-composed by Shahab Qamar.

Ghalti Mein Shta was a major hit, and was ranked number ten in the top Pakistani songs of 2014. At 3rd Annual Hum Awards ceremony, it was nominated for Best Music Single for duo and Best Music Video for Shahab Qamar.

== About the song ==
The song was recorded by two production teams, Australia (Shahab) and Pakistan (Naseer). Naseer Afridi writes and composed the song in Pakistan, while Shahab directed, produced and co-composed from Australia.

== Music video ==
=== Synopsis ===
The video depicts a female protagonist regularly visits her lover's memorial after he was lost at sea. Every time, she leaves a seashell at the site as a totem of remembrance, not knowing that she has woken him up from a limbo in another dimension of reality. He wanders aimlessly until the seashells in his pocket, which he has collected in the past, remind him that he has passed on. A strange entity guides him towards the next seashell. He knows she is there. He follows it hastily, hoping that he can reach it before she leaves. He finds the seashell and tries to send a message back with it. But she has already started walking away. She feels it and turns back to see if it's real but it’s already too late. She would visit again and he is hoping to reach back to her next time, in time."

=== Cast and crew ===
- Lyricist: Naseer Afridi
- Producer: Shahab Qamar
- Director: Shahab Qamar (Australia) and Kashif Ali/Dexter (Paskiatn)
- Composer: Naseer & Shahab
- Rocording / Mixing: Shaheer Shahid
- Post: Shahab Qamar
- Artist: Naseer Afridi, Shahab Qamar and Zainab Wajih

== Track listing ==
- Digital download (2014)

"Ghalti Mein Shta" featuring Naseer Afridi, Shahab Qamar and Zainab Wajih — 6:18

== Accolades ==
The single receives following nominations at 2015 Hum Awards:

Year	Award	Category	Recipient(s)	Result
2015	3rd Hum Awards	Best Solo Single	Naseer & Shahab	Nominated
2015	3rd Hum Awards	Best Music Video	Shahab Qamar	Won

== See also ==
- "Shikva" by Faakhir
