= Ab Dekh Khuda Kya Karta Hai =

2018 Pakistani television series

- اب دیکھ خدا کیا کرتا ہے
- Genre: Family drama Thriller; Social Serial
- Written by: Syed Zarrar Ahmed
- Directed by: Syed Ali Raza Usama
- Starring: Danish Taimoor; Sanam Chaudhry; Humayun Ashraf
- Country of origin: Pakistan
- Original language: Urdu
- No. of seasons: 1
- No. of episodes: 24

Production
- Producer: Babar Javed
- Production location: Pakistan
- Running time: Approx 40 Minutes

Original release
- Network: Geo Entertainment
- Release: 7 August 2018 – 1 January 2019

Ab Dekh Khuda Kya Karta Hai (Urdu: اب دیکھ خدا کیا کرتا ہے, transl. Now see what God does) is a 2018 Pakistani drama serial directed by Syed Ali Raza Usama, produced by Babar Javed, and written by Syed Zarrar Ahmed. The drama stars Danish Taimoor, Sanam Chaudhry, Yashma Gill and Humayun Ashraf as the main leads. The serial premiered on 7 August 2018 on Geo Entertainment, preceded by Silsilay. Danish Taimoor plays the antihero in this serial.

The drama marks the second on-screen appearance of Sanam Chaudhry and Danish Taimoor together after Ru Baru Ishq Tha.

On 8th November, the drama achieved its highest TRP ratings of 15.86 TRP and become an Industry HIT Drama by breaking record of Khaani 11.9 TRP. The last episode achieved TRP ratings of 14.1 TRP with peak TRP of 17.4. The drama is also available in India on Zee5. During on air, The drama trended on YouTube with excellent Viewership. It proved to be an ALL TIME BLOCKBUSTER during on air. The mega success of this drama paved the way for anti-hero heroes drama in Pakistani drama industry

== Plot ==
Fraudulent businessman, Jan-e-Alam, manipulates young, innocent girls who are chronically jobless, by giving them a job and subjecting them to improper advances. Many women working under Jan-e-Alam are constantly harassed, subjected to assaults, and slandered when they refuse his advances.

Maryam is also victimised by him. When she refuses to comply with his inappropriate demands, he traps her in a business scam and gets her jailed. Maryam manages to get herself out, but she keeps finding herself under the threat of her malicious ex-employer who doesn't seem to stop making her life miserable. He tries to use her to get a consignment, but she saves herself and runs back to her house in a state of trauma. His partner in crime is his driver, who goes to bring Maryam back, but her mother saves her this time. Alam deeply loves his mother and sister, who trust him completely. However, his reformed driver urges Maryam to reveal the truth at his sister’s engagement. She follows his advice, leading to Alam losing his family's trust. Determined to retaliate, he vows revenge. He gets her marriage broken and then marries her instead faking he has changed but on the reception day he humiliates her and divorces her. Maryam replies saying, Look how my god will take revenge from you and then the show takes a leap.

Maryam is now working in a school owned by Shan-e-Alam. Unknown to her, he is Jan-e-Alam's younger brother and is kind-hearted. She is very rude to Shan, but eventually he starts falling in love with her. He helps her in every way possible and tries to propose her, but she tells him that she is divorced and expects that he will leave her after this revelation. But he instead talks to his mother about the alliance. She goes with him but is shocked to see Maryam since Alam told her about all his brutalities and asks her to refuse this marriage. She, while returning home, gets into an accident and dies after telling Alam about Maryam. So he goes to meet her and she accepts his apologies and then he promises Shan to make him marry the girl he loves but is shocked to see that the house is of Maryam. He pleads her to marry his brother to which she agrees. After their marriage he commits suicide because of his guilt and leaves a letter of his confessions. Shan and Maryam live their life happily ever after.

== Cast ==
=== Main cast ===
- Danish Taimoor as Jaan-e-Alam (Maryam's first husband)
- Sanam Chaudhry as Maryam Naseer
- Humayun Ashraf as Shaan-e-Alam (Maryam's second husband)
- Yashma Gill as Noor-ul-Saba

=== Recurring cast ===
- Qavi Khan as Naseer (Maryam's father)
- Sajida Syed as Firdous (Jaan and Shan's Mother)
- Rashid Farooqui as Malik (Maryam's name sake brother and Jaan's assistant)
- Hajra Khan as Malik's wife
- Parveen Akbar as Shaista (Maryam's mother)
- Salahuddin Tunio as Minister
- Faizan Shaikh as Hadeed (Jaan's friend)
- Farah Nadir as the headmistress friend of Maryam
- Maryam Noor as Erum (Jaan and Shan's younger sister)
- Ali Rizvi as Hammad (Erum's love interest)
- Talat Iqbal as Ashfaq
- Farzana Thaeem as Salma
- Saman Ansari
- Saifee Hassan as Minister's Assistant

== Broadcast and release ==
=== Broadcast ===
Ab Dekh Khuda Kya Karta Hai premiered on 7 August 2018. Ab Dekh Khuda Kya Karta Hai aired a weekly episode on every Tuesday succeeding Silsilay, starting from its premiere date, with the time slot of 8:00 pm.

=== Digital release and streaming service ===
Ab Dekh Khuda Kya Karta Hai was also uploaded on YouTube alongside its airing on TV, and all episodes are available there. It is also available on Indian streaming platform Zee5.
