= Pukaar (Pakistani TV series) =

- Genre: Drama
- Written by: Adeel Razzak
- Directed by: Farooq Rind
- Starring: Zahid Ahmed; Yumna Zaidi; Jia Ali
- Theme music composer: Shuja Haider
- Opening theme: Shuja Haider
- Country of origin: Pakistan
- Original language: Urdu
- No. of episodes: 26

Production
- Executive producer: Samina Humayun Saeed
- Producers: Humayun Saeed; Shahzad Nasib
- Running time: 40 Minutes
- Production company: Six Sigma Plus

Original release
- Network: ARY Digital
- Release: 8 February – 12 July 2018

Pukaar (Urdu: پکار; lit: Call) is a 2018 Pakistani drama serial that premiered on 8 February 2018 on ARY Digital. It is directed by Farooq Rind and written by Adeel Razzaq. The drama stars Zahid Ahmed and Yumna Zaidi in lead roles, in their third on-screen appearance after Jugnoo and Zara Yaad Kar. The serial is produced by Humayun Saeed and Shehzad Nasib under their production company Six Sigma Plus.

== Plot ==
Samra is a bubbly, innocent and cheerful girl who lives a perfect happy life with her parents. Fahad Sultan, the son of a feudal lord, studies with Samra and the two fall in love. They get married and live a happy life although Samra has problems adjusting in a feudal environment, having been raised in a modern household. Fahad is about to contest elections due to the influence of his politician father, but some enemies shoot him dead. This turns Samra's life upside down. She is deeply saddened by her husband's death and in addition to that, her in-laws impose all sorts of restrictions on Samra, who is pregnant with Fahad's child. Samra's father dies in a car crash and she is not even allowed to attend her own father's funeral.

Fahad's father, Sultan Asfandyar is deeply sadden by the death of his son and he believes he has lost his son because of a sin that he had committed, by abandoning his first son. 28 years ago, Asfandyar had married Amna (Saba Faisal) but his mother Lalimaa jad refused to accept Amna because of which Asfandyar left the pregnant Amna. Now Asfandyar decides to bring Amna and her son to his house to rectify his mistakes. He meets his son Saarang. Saarang did not know that his father was alive and when he gets to know the truth, he is furious but Asfandyar manages to beg Saarang to come to his mansion. Amna and Saarang enter the mansion and face rejection from Laalimaa(Naveed Shahzad) and Aafandyar's second wife Taashfeen (Jia Ali). Taashfeen does not want to give Saarang the position of Fahad but Asfandyar gives Saarang all the authorities that Fahad had. Saarang falls in love with Samra. Samra gives birth to Fahad's son Qasim. Samra is miserable at the haveli so Saarang tries to help her by getting her a secret mobile phone which she can use to contact her mother. Samra finally runs away from the haveli with the help of Saarang. Saarang decides that the only way he can get Samra to safety is if she marries him as Saarang now has power and authority. Samra initially refuses out of loyalty to Fahad but unknowingly she starts to fall for him. Thinking of her son, she agrees to marry Saarang and they do so and face rejection from the family except Amna. Saarang decides to take his mother and Samra with them to live somewhere else but is stopped by Laali Maa who refuses to let Samra leave and taunts her for betraying Fahad. Samra retaliates by calling her out of her behaviour saying she’s the reason for everything even Fahad’s death and she continues criticising her until Laali Maa suffers a heart attack.

Samra moves away to live with her mum and Laali Maa finally wakes up and regrets everything she has done. She finally accepts Saarang as her grandson and also Samra but the latter is still unable to forgive her. Asfandyar visits Samra and his grandson and asks forgiveness and she forgives him and finally lets him see his grandson. In her imagination, Samra sees Fahad who tells her to accept her feelings for Saarang and gives his blessings. In the end, Samra finally forgives Laali Maa and she and Saarang finally confess their love for each other.

== Cast ==
- Yumna Zaidi as Samra Najaf; Sarang’s wife, Fahad’s former wife
- Zahid Ahmed as Sarang Sultan; Sultan and Amna’s son, Samra’s second husband
- Saad Qureshi as Fahad Sultan; Sultan and Taashfeen’s son, Samra’s first husband (deceased)
- Navid Shahzad as Laali Maa; Sultan Asfand’s mother
- Rehan Sheikh as Sultan Asfand; Sarang and Fahad’s father, Laali Maa’s son, Amna and Taashfeen’s husband
- Jia Ali as Taashfeen; Fahad's mother, Sultan’s second wife
- Laila Zuberi as Rabia; Samra's mother
- Shehryar Zaidi as Najaf; Samra's father
- Saba Faisal as Amna; Sarang's mother, Sultan’s first wife
- Kausar Siddiqui as Zamani; Laali Maa’s maid

== Awards and nominations ==
Year	Award	Category	Recipient(s)	Result	Ref.
2019	ARY Digital- Social Media Drama Awards 2018	Best Negative Actor (Female)	Navid Shahzad	Nominated	
2019	ARY Digital- Social Media Drama Awards 2018	Best Newcomer (Male)	Saad Qureshi	Nominated	
2019	ARY Digital- Social Media Drama Awards 2018	Best Couple	Zahid Ahmed and Yumna Zaidi	Nominated	
