= Aasmanon Pay Likha =

Pakistani TV series (2013–2014)

- Title screen
- Also known as: Urdu: آسمانوں پہ لکھا
- Genre: Drama; Romance; Social
- Written by: Rabia Razzaq
- Directed by: Mohsin Mirza
- Creative director: Kashif Ahmed Butt
- Starring: Sajal Aly; Sheheryar Munawar; Sanam Chaudhry
- Theme music composer: Mohsin Allah Ditta
- Opening theme: "Asmanoo Per Hai Likha" by Adeeb
- Composer: Waqar Ali
- Country of origin: Pakistan
- Original language: Urdu
- No. of episodes: 24

Production
- Producers: Asif Raza Mir; Babar Javed
- Production locations: Karachi, Lahore
- Cinematography: Fayaz Khan
- Editor: Faraz Khan
- Camera setup: Multi-camera
- Running time: 40-45 minutes
- Production company: A & B Entertainment

Original release
- Network: Geo Entertainment
- Release: 18 September 2013 – 5 March 2014

Aasmanon Pay Likha (Urdu: آسمانوں پہ لکھا, lit. 'Written in the stars') is a Pakistani television series that aired on Geo Entertainment television. It stars Sajal Aly and Sheheryar Munawar in lead roles.

== Plot ==
Qudsia is a middle-class girl who dreams of a simple married life. Unfortunately, her in-laws demand a hefty sum of dowry. Qudsia's family was not able to pay the dowry. Her father eventually has a heart attack after being insulted. Aaliyan, who has come to attend his employee's daughter's wedding, ends up marrying Qudsia.

Qudsia marries Aaliyan, who doesn't believe in the nikkah as he only sees it as a deal to protect her and is still adamant about marrying his longtime fiancée, Natasha. Aaliyan's family is extremely angry with him for marrying such a girl without informing them.

Aaliyan is close to his Dadi and tells her about the drama. His Dadi says that she'll try to resolve the matter. She goes to Qudsia's house to talk, but she realises that Qudsia's father will not survive her divorce. He says that as long as Qudsia is happy and married, he will be fine. Dadi takes Qudsia back home.

Natasha is again angry with Aaliyan, leaves his room, and runs into Qudsia. She gets even more upset. Aaliyan asks Dadi why she brought Qudsia with her again. Dadi explains the entire matter to him. He says he'll divorce her, but his Dadi warns him not to do so. Dadi tells him how good Qudsia is and how this will affect her and her family though it is not even her mistake.

After some days, Qudsia's father decides to work again. He goes to the office where Aaliyan's father insults him and his daughter, and he has a heart attack, leading to his death. Qudsia gets depressed and breaks down in front of Aaliyan. Aaliyan supports her and consoles her.

Later he returns to his house, where everyone is angry with him. He decides to go back to Qudsia's place. He goes there and stays there. Later he tells Qudsia that he has to leave. Qudsia requests him to stay as it is raining. But Aaliyan does not listen. But his car breaks down. So he stays there.

The next day, Natasha comes there angrily and takes Aaliyan with her. Natasha and Aaliyan soon get married and live in America. Qudsia gets a job at Aaliyan's biological mother's place. She cares for her, unaware that she is Aaliyan's biological mother.

Meanwhile, relations between Aaliyan and Natasha are not good. Natasha keeps thinking that Aaliyan is cheating on her. Soon they come to Pakistan. Natasha is mad at Aaliyan every day on one matter or another. Shamsa (Aaliyan's biological mother) starts liking Qudsia for Shehnawas (Shamsa's brother-in-law), whose wife has died.

Shamsa then visits Aaliyan's Dadi. She gives her the address and asks her to give it to Aaliyan. Dadi gives it to Aaliyan and asks him to meet her. He then goes to her but is angry at her as she left him while he was young. Shamsa gets emotional and wishes to talk to him and hug him, but he refuses and then leaves. Shamsa then tells Qudsia that today his son came and met her. Qudsia is happy for her. Shamsa then tells her something where she mentions Aaliyan, and glass falls from Qudsia's hands as she is in deep shock.

After a few days, Aaliyan again visits his mother. He is furious and wants to know why she left him. As he gets out of his car, he meets Shehnawas and his daughter. His daughter greets him and says, "Nice to meet you, uncle." to which he replies, "Nice to meet you." and then sees Qudsia and says, "Again". They then enter the house, where Aaliyan continues to shout at his mother as she cries. He then leaves.

Later Shamsa's health worsens as she has cancer at the last stage. Aaliyan comes there. She says she wants to hug him, but he refuses and leaves. Soon Shamsa passes away. Qudsia kept calling Aaliyan, but he couldn't answer as he was asleep. Later when he goes to the hospital, he breaks down in tears and hugs his mother.

He asks his Dad about his mother and then learns that she wasn't a bad woman. He shouts and leaves. His Dad comes to his Dadi and yells at her on various matters, which causes her death. When Aaliyan returns to her, he keeps talking to her and realizes that she has died. He again breaks down in tears.

Later Shahnawaz informs Qudsia about her death which results in Qudsia crying and she tries calling Aaliyan. Aaliyan calls on Shamsa's phone, which he was sure that Qudsia would pick up, and she did. He cries on the phone, as does Qudsia. Qudsia then goes to Aaliyan's place to console him. While she is about to leave, Aaliyan holds her hand and asks her to stay. He says, "Mai bhi ruka tha kyunki tumhe meri zaroorat thi". She replies, "Aap ruke kyunki aap ki gaadi kharab hogayi thi". He then admits that his car did not break down.

Soon his dad arrives and insults Qudsia. She runs out of the room, and Natasha arrives there. She slaps her and insults her. Shahnawaz comes and takes her back. Later Aaliyan comes to Qudsia and tells Shahnawaz about him and Qudsia. Aaliyan tells Qudsia that he needs her. She says that their marriage was a contract. Aaliyan requests that she should never call their marriage a contract. She says to give her a divorce. He says, "Pehle tum divorce nahi chahti thi aur ab mai ...mai tumhe divorce nahi dunga". She again says to give her a divorce. He holds her hand, brings her closer, and says she is his wife. She says being a wife does not mean that whenever he wants, he can hold her hands, and whenever he feels he can leave. He apologizes to her. He then says he will come the next day and asks her to be ready. When he reaches home, Natasha shouts and says she can't live with him anymore. She goes back to America. Later Aaliyan's dad goes and insults Qudsia, to which she answers sincerely. The show ends with Aaliyan and Qudsia happy together.

== Cast ==
- Sajal Ali as Qudsia
- Sheheryar Munawar Aaliyan
- Sanam Chaudhry as Natasha
- Saba Hameed as Shamsa
- Emmad Irfani as Shahnawaz
- Naima Khan as Abda
- Sukaina Khan as Sobia
- Azra Aftab as Aaliyan's grandmother
- Farah Nadir as Asma
- Mehmood Akhtar as Aaliyan's father
- Saba Faisal as Aaliyan's mother
- Tariq Jameel as Qudsia's father
- Sumera Hassan as Haleema, Shehzad's mother
- Yasir Ali Khan as Adil
- Nasreen John as Shehzad's aunt
- Birjees Farooqui as Aapa
- Rehana Kaleem as Adil's mother
- Pari Hashmi as Qudisa's sister
- Urooj Abbas as Ashraf Hussain
- Manzoor Qureshi as Shahnawaz's father

== Production and project details ==
Project Details
Release Date	18 September 2013
Genre	Drama
Network	Geo Television Network
Producers	Asif Raza Mir and Babar Javed
Director	Mohsin Mirza
Writer	Rabia Razzaque
Presentation	Geo A&B Productions

== Original sound track ==
OST : Aasmanon Pay Likha
Vocals	Adeeb
Lyrics	Sabir Zafar
Music Composer	Waqar Ali

== Reception ==
The drama serial soon became popular after its premiere. The most popular serial of that time received the highest TRPs of 10. The drama serial even beat the 2011's blockbuster Humsafar in terms of ratings and became the highest-rated drama serial in the history of Pakistani satellite television. The serial's GRPs were 521 of only 20 episodes, while that of Humsafar had a GRPs of 353 (which had a total of 23 episodes). However, some critics remarked that Aly was typecast as she earlier played a similar character, Gori, in Gohar-e-Nayab.

== Accolades ==
=== Awards ===
Year	Award	Category	Recipient(s)	Result
11 January 2014	Pakistan Media Awards	Best Drama Original Soundtrack	Sohail Haider	Won

=== Nominations ===
- Lux Style Awards - Best TV Play
- Lux Style Awards - Best TV Director - Mohsin Mirza

== See also ==
- List of programs broadcast by Geo TV
- 2014 in Pakistani television
- 2013 in Pakistani television
