= Zindagi Tujh Ko Jiya =

- Genre: Soap; Romantic Comedy
- Written by: Adam Azeen
- Directed by: Abis Raza
- Starring: Sanam Chaudhry; Eshita Syed
- Theme music composer: Sohail Haider
- Opening theme: 100 Din Ki Kahani..Aik Pal Ki Kahani Hai by Shahbaz lyrics by Sabir Zafar
- Country of origin: Pakistan
- Original language: Urdu
- No. of episodes: 60

Production
- Producers: Momina Duraid; Gemstones
- Production location: Karachi, Sindh
- Camera setup: Multi-Camera
- Production company: MD Productions

Original release
- Network: Hum TV
- Release: 22 February – 2 June 2016

Zindagi Tujh Ko Jiya is a Pakistani romantic soap which premiered on 22 February 2016 on Hum TV and aired in the evenings from Monday to Thursday. It is directed by Abis Raza, written by Adam Azeen and produced by Momina Duraid under her home production and Gem Stones Productions. It was previously aired on Hum Sitaray as 100 Din Ki Kahani but was not finished.

== Synopsis ==
The drama revolves around a woman Maryam (Sanam Chaudhry) who loves Zeeshan (Furqan Qureshi). While, Maryam has a sister in law Samra (Eshita Syed), Zeeshan has two sisters: Safia and Sania. Safia and her mother wanted that Zeeshan marry Afshan, her husband Khalid's sister. His other sister supported Maryam as she thinks she is good for Zeeshan. Zeeshan and Maryam marry as a court marriage which angries her in-laws except Sania. Maryam, who is six months pregnant and counting days for her baby to be born. However, while she is looking forward to the big day, her husband is diagnosed with cancer and is left with approximately the same number of days to live.

== Cast ==
- Sanam Chaudhry as Maryam
- Furqan Qureshi as Zeeshan
- Zara Tareen as Safia
- Eshita Syed as Samra
- Mazhar Ali as Maryam's dad
- Aamir Qureshi as Bilal
- Seema Seher
- Komal Iqbal as Sania

== Controversy ==
HUM was accused of having copied their sister channel's show '100 Din Ki Kahani' and splitting the serial episodes up into small daily soap episodes.
