= Bhool (2014 TV series) =

Pakistani soap opera television series

- Genre: Soap series Romantic; Family drama
- Written by: Syed Wasi Shah
- Directed by: Asad Mumtaz Malik
- Theme music composer: Wajid Saeed
- Country of origin: Pakistan
- Original language: Urdu
- No. of episodes: 76

Production
- Producers: Momina Duraid; Gemstone Production
- Production location: Karachi
- Camera setup: Multi-camera setup
- Running time: 20 minutes

Original release
- Network: Hum TV
- Release: 13 January – 24 April 2014

Bhool (Urdu: بھول, lit. 'Mistake') is a 2014 Pakistani soap series that aired on Hum TV. It is directed by Asad Mumtaz Malik and written by veteran writer and poet Syed Wasi Shah. The series was produced by Momina Duraid at Gemstone Productions. It stars Sanam Chaudhry, Sarah Khan, Behroze Sabzwari, Fazila Qazi, Shehroz Sabzwari, Saleem Sheikh and Farah Shah in pivot roles. At the 3rd Hum Awards, the series was nominated for Best Soap Actor for Shehroz Sabzwari, Best Soap Actress for Sanam Chaudhry and Best Soap Series for Momina Duraid which she ultimately won for another production of hers Susraal Mera.

== Plot ==
The story is set against a backdrop of political intrigue revolving around a family that suffers from love, hate, selfishness and deceit. Sardar Jahanzaib is a political leader who kills his second wife for political gains. The murder results in a psychologically devastated daughter Hira. There is also a parallel track in which Ayaz and Nadia, hailing from two opposing political camps, run away from their families to get married. Ayaz's father forgives him and introduces the couple to his close friend Sardar Jahanzaib where they meet Hira. Their fate depends upon the relation they carry throughout their lives.

== Cast ==
- Haya Sehgal as hira's stepmother- main antagonist
- Fazila Qazi as Nadia's mother
- Mazhar Ali as the old creepy man who kidnap Shazan and Nadia's daughter
- Zainab Qayyum "ZQ" as Annie, Hira's mom
- Sarah Khan as Nadia- female protagonist
- Anas Aleem Hira's bad maid
- Sanam Chaudhry as Hira - female antagonist
- Behroze Sabzwari as Nadia's father
- Shehroz Sabzwari as Shazan - male protagonist
- Saleem Sheikh as Hira's father
- Anas Ali Imran as Rashid

== Accolades ==
At 3rd Hum Awards soap was nominated for following nominations:

- Best Soap Actor - Shehroz Sabzwari (nom)
- Best Soap Actress - Sanam Chaudhry (nom)
- Best Soap Series - Momina Duraid (nom)
