= Tum Larkay Bhi Na =

Pakistani television series

- Written by: Faseeh Bari Khan
- Directed by: Yasir Nawaz
- Starring: Aina Asif; Ali Dayyan Walji; Sami Khan; Emaan Syed; Yasir Nawaz; Vaneeza Ahmed; Faiza Hassan; Amna Malik; Aimen Abbasi; Adnan Jaffar; Abid Ali
- Country of origin: Pakistan
- Original language: Urdu
- No. of seasons: 1

Production
- Producer: Momina Duraid
- Production company: Momina Duraid Productions

Original release
- Network: Hum TV
- Release: 19 February 2026

Tum Larkay Bhi Na is a Pakistani television drama series written by Faseeh Bari Khan, directed by Yasir Nawaz and produced by Momina Duraid under Momina Duraid Productions. The series premiered on Hum TV on 19 February 2026.

The story follows three closely connected families and explores relationships between different generations. It centres on Badrika (Aina Asif) and Zoyan (Ali Dayyan), whose developing relationship is complicated by misunderstandings and family dynamics. The series also explores differences in parenting approaches and marital relationships.

== Cast ==
- Aina Asif as Badrika
- Ali Dayyan Walji as Zoyan
- Sami Khan
- Emaan Syed
- Yasir Nawaz
- Vaneeza Ahmed as Nazish
- Faiza Hassan as Uroosa
- Amna Malik
- Aimen Abbasi
- Adnan Jaffar
- Abid Ali
