= Aik Nayee Cinderella =

2012 Pakistani TV series

- Title screen
- Also known as: A New Cinderella
- Genre: Drama; Romantic fantasy
- Written by: Faiza Iftikhar
- Directed by: Haissam Hussain
- Starring: Maya Ali; Osman Khalid Butt; Faizan Khawaja; Eshita Mehboob; Saba Hameed
- Country of origin: Pakistan
- Original language: Urdu
- No. of episodes: 19

Production
- Running time: 40-45 minutes
- Production companies: A & B entertainment

Original release
- Network: Geo Entertainment
- Release: 13 October 2012 – 13 March 2013

Aik Nayee Cinderella (English: A New Cinderella) is a 2012 Pakistani drama serial broadcast on Geo TV every Saturday. The drama is based on the novel of the same name by Faiza Iftikhar (a modern retelling of the story of Cinderella) and directed by Haissam Hussain, starring Maya Ali, Osman Khalid Butt and Faizan Khawaja. It was released on 13 October 2012 with the production of A & B Entertainment.

== Plot ==
The drama is a modern retelling of the story of Cinderella. Meesha (Maya Ali) lives with her step-mother and two step-sisters. She is mistreated by her step-mother and does all the household work. Meesha meets the rich and dashing Mayer (Osman Khalid Butt). Meesha, thinking that he is her prince charming, who has come to rescue her and put an end to all her troubles, tries to win his heart. Mayer falls in love with her whom he had once met but cannot recognize her because Meesha's face was covered when she met him. Meesha's step-sister lies to Mayer saying that she is the girl whom he had met and fell in love with and tries to make him fall for her. Rooman (Faizan Khwaja) helps out Meesha claiming to be a fairy man sent by the fairy godmother to help her. Over time she develops a close friendship with Rooman. Mayer realizes that the girl whom he had fallen in love with was Meesha. She is supposed to marry Mayer but she feels confused over her feelings and cannot figure out whom she likes best: Mayer or Rooman. The story progresses as she gets in touch with her true feelings.

== Episodes ==
=== Episode 1 ===
The episode starts with a small girl, Meesha, who has a horrible dream. Afraid, she goes to her grandmother- "Dado", and tells her about the dream. Dado interprets the dream as a bad omen. On the other side, Saifullah persuades his wife, Meher to come home and live with Meesha. Meher refuses as she considers Meesha, Saifullah's illegitimate daughter. Saifullah has a heart attack and dies. At his funeral, Meher arrives with her two daughters, Zaini and Aimee. As Saifullah named his property on behalf of Dado, Meher agrees to keep Meesha at home but refuses to spend any money on her. Meesha's hardships begin as Meher and her daughters treat her poorly. One day, someone passes near their home announcing the inauguration of a carnival festival. All three of the girls are excited after hearing of the festival.

=== Episode 2 ===
Zaini and Aimee start preparing for the festival along with continuing to be ill to Meesha. Meesha also wants to go so she asks Meher. Meher refuses to hurt Meesha even more. Moreover, Dado also denies permission to Meesha. However, Meesha secretly prepares her own dress for the festival by "lending" decorative items from both sisters. Meher is distressed as Bano wants to come to meet Dado. Bano, whose marriage was initially fixed with Saifullah, but was later broken by him since he wanted to marry Meher. To ensure that Meesha doesn't go to the fest, Meher gives huge amount of work to her. Meesha finishes all of the work early and heads to the festival wearing a mask. Meher and both the girls go to the festival where they accidentally brush up with Meesha. At the fest, Meesha meets Mayer, but Mayer is unable to see Meesha's face due to her mask. As she is getting late, she takes shortcut via boat along with Mayer. Upon reaching home, Meher finds Meesha working which lifts suspicion that she was at the festival as well. Dado learns about her trip and becomes angry with her. Meesha finds that her one earring is lost. The earring is with Mayer. Zaini discusses about the fest with her friends. While meeting with Suriya, a neighbor, Meher learns that Bano is the only richest woman in town and is searching for a suitable bride for her son, Mayer. Dramas Online

=== Episode 3 ===
Meesha again sees the horrible dream. The next day, Meesha falls ill. Meher with changed attitude, agrees to invite Bano to her home. When Dado suspects her intentions, she clearly states that she wouldn't help her. Bano arrives at Meher with Mayer. There, Zaini confides him that she was the girl whom he met at the fest. Bano and Dado have some older talk about Saifullah and who Meesha really is. Next day, Bano invites all of the girls in the town to come to her home. This is to help Mayer select a bride. Zaini and Aimee prepares for the function; Meesha also wants to go to the function. She asks Dado to come with her to Bano's mansion. In order to prevent Meesha from going to the function, Meher puts sleeping pills in Dado's soup. As a result, Dado keeps sleeping at the time of the function which upsets Meesha.

=== Episode 4 ===
Meher telephones Bano to tell her that Meesha isn't coming. Meesha being distressed, starts crying badly and complains to Allah for her problems and asks fairy godmother to come down and solve her problems. As she opens her eyes, Meesha finds a man standing front of her. When she asks, he tells that his name is Roman and he is a fairyman who has come down to help her. He further tells her about her life making her believe in him. Roman helps her by making her reach Bano's mansion and giving her a beautiful dress. At the function, Meesha in her mask, messes up everything and quickly runs out from there. She curses Roman for everything. It is later revealed to the viewers that Roman is actually the nephew of Suraiya, whom she has called to do her household work. Later Roman gives Meesha tips about attracting Mayer towards her.

=== Episode 5 ===
Relationship starts brewing between Mayer and Zaini. Meesha is upset at seeing all this. Roman gives her tips and asks her to ignore him as much as possible. Meanwhile, Meher, after seeing Roman asks Suraiya to send him to her home so as to do small house works. At first Suraiya is hesitant, but Roman convinces her to send him so as he can earn some cash. Bano asks Zaini to come to her home and help her in work. Mayer ask Zaini so as she can impress Bano. She has also called Meesha for doing the work which Dado declines. After a lot of persuasion, Dado finally agrees. Roman accidentally spills water on Zaini's hair so to prevent her from going to Bano.

=== Episode 6 ===
Both Meesha and Zaini arrive at Banos mansion. Meesha uses Roman's tips and Mayer asks her name. She becomes overjoyed. On the other side, due to prolonged outside night trips, Suraiya ejects Roman from her house. Roman sleeps outside Meher's house. Meanwhile, Zaini asks Mayer to cancel the rasam function which he refuses as he can't go against her mother's wishes. Mayer becomes furious over her stubborn attitude. Further Meesha adds fuel to fire by provoking Zaini against Bano saying that Bano dislikes her. Further Suraiya attitude towards Roman becomes changed as she learns about his good qualities.

=== Episode 7 ===
Suraiya becomes caring towards Roman. She even asks Roman to marry her to which Roman disagrees. Misunderstandings further enhance between Mayer and Zaini. Meher after learning of Suraiya's thoughts asks Roman to stay with her. Zaini had an argument with Bano which further enrages Mayer and creates distances within them. As Mayer tries to convince his mom, she agrees on one condition that Zaini should say sorry to her in rasam function in front of everyone. Suraiya again convinces Roman. Mayer tells Banos decision to Zaini. Meesha further fills ears of Bano against Zaini. Zaini to tease Mayer, tells him about her previous fake boyfriends. In Shahbad, an old person named Shah Baba is about to bring a girl to his reign.

=== Episode 8 ===
Closeness between Mayer and Meesha start increasing. On other side, Roman likeness towards Meesha increases. In Shahbad, Shah Baba scolds Farjad, his waliad for his negligence and asks him to bring his pride back to him. Farjad continues his search. Complications between Mayer and Zaini increase. To tease Zaini, Mayer starts using Meesha to tease Zaini.

=== Episode 9 ===
As Farjad approaches Zaini, she makes him run away as a thief. To save Zaini from mental depression, Meher scolds Meesha and warns her of not going near Mayer. Zaini convinces Bano and asks sorry from her thus keeping both Mayer and Bano under control. Seeing this, Meesha gets depressed and cries in front of Roman and expresses her grief. Back at home, she thinks about Roman and develops feelings about Roman. Farjad meets Aimee. Zaini and Mayer are happy about their marriage. Once again Meesha sees dream and finds Mayer chasing her. Farjad calls Shah Baba to tell him that he has found the girl.

=== Episode 10 ===
Roman confesses his feelings towards Meesha to Dado. Dado insists him to confess to Meesha. New relations begin between Aimee and Farjad. Zaini scuttles back Farjad in front of Aimee thus insulting Farjad. Aimee becomes angry with Zaini. For revenge, Aimee tells Mayer that the girl whom he met at festival was Meesha, not Zaini. Hearing this, Mayer breaks his relation with Zaini. Love blossoms between Farjad and Aimee. Dado confesses her desires to Roman for Meesha. As they are discussing about his lie, Suraiya comes and asks about the lie.

=== Episode 11 ===
To save Zaini's relation, Meher invoke Bano about Meesha's mother, her family and puts seed of doubt. As Meher scold Meesha for Mayer, she openly says that she isn't interested in Mayer. In front of Suraiya, Roman tells that he lied to Meesha about fairy god so as to help her and he did all this as he loved her. Meesha is broken after hearing this and becomes rude towards him. Farjad asks Aimee to run away from her house. Meesha agrees to marry Mayer. Dado is angry as Meesha didn't ask her once about her decision. Meher asks Bano to ask Bano about Meesha's mother which enrages Dado. Conflict arise between Meesha and Dado. As Meher beats Meesha, Roman comes to rescue her. Meanwhile, Shah Baba orders to decorate his mansion for her good luck arrival.

=== Episode 12 ===
Mayer sees conservation between Meesha and Roman and questions about it. As Roman leaves for city, Suraiya stops him by blackmailing him saying that she will tell about his love towards Meesha to Mayer. Bano asks Meesha to come to her home so as she can learn their home rules. Dado is against it but Meesha decides to go there. Meanwhile, Zaini is caught having drugs. Mayer bails her out. Aimee leaves her house. Meesha leaves but returns halfway to meet Dado. Meher is heartbroken due to her daughters. Roman wants to work so as not to prove himself wrong in the eyes of the world.

=== Episode 13 ===
Aimee meets Shah Baba. Meesha consoles Meher. Seeing her caring attitude, Meher has a change of heart. She asks Dado to go with Meesha to Bano so as to repent for her deeds. Meanwhile, Bano asks Suraiya for a wedding planner. At Shahbad, Shah Baba shows his whole region to Aimee. Meanwhile, Zaini protests Meher's decision to which she console her by saying that she is actually going to destroy Meesha desire of marrying Mayer. Real hardship for Zaini begins as she has to constantly serve Dado. At other side, in lack of exposure to outer world, Meesha shows her low standard habits which disgust Bano.

=== Episode 14 ===
Suariya offers Roman work of wedding planner at Mayer house. Meher further sweetly destroys Meesha further plans. Farjad troubles grow as Aimee questions about Shah baba's talks. The animals die, crops are destroyed, bridge is broken. Shah Baba considers it as bad omen and assumes that Aimee is not that girl. Meher further creates rifts between Meesha and Bano. Shah Baba keeps an eye on Aimee and comes to confirm that Aimee was wrong girl and scolds Farjad for that.

=== Episode 15 ===
Shah Baba throws Aimee into prison. Meesha seeing gardener goes and helps him in his work, thus making her hands dirty. It is revealed that the lucky girl is the daughter of sikandar who was killed by Shah Baba and his wife died in shock. Shah Baba took his daughter and decided to marry her to Farjad aged seven years. Meesha goes with Roman to cloth designer where she bargains for clothes thus irritating Bano. Meanwhile, Dado's health deteriorates. Rifts between Meesha and Bano continue to grow. Shah Baba decides to go to Meesha himself to take her. Farjad pleads Shah Baba to release Aimee which he declines. Dado's health deteriorates very much. A heated argument takes place between Meesha and Bano. Mayer seeing her mother being insulted slaps Meesha. Meesha is shocked. Both Mayer and Meesha are disturbed.

=== Episode 16 ===
Suraiya once again tries to get Roman to marry her by again blackmailing to which Roman responds by saying to her to tell the truth to Mayer. Mayer convinces Meesha to obey his mother to which she furiously denies. Shah Baba meets Bano and Meher, and requests them to take his Khushbakt or Meesha with him by framing false story about her family. Meesha agrees to go with him but on condition that first before going she will meet her Dado and second that Mayer will go along with her. Shah Baba agrees. Suraiya ejects Roman out of her house finally. When Meesha goes to meet Dado, Zaini stops and convinces her to go. Dado tells Roman about Meesha's truth. When Saifullah was posted in Shahbad, he went to Hakim Sikandar for treatment. Shah Baba was irritant of Sikandar as he disrupted his magical and spiritual work of him. That's why he never allowed to open school in Shahbad. Saifullah gives him solution that he will take Meesha to his home and nurture her as his own daughter. Shah Baba, Meesha and Mayer travel in train. Mayer, being not habitual of travelling by train feels uncomfortable.

=== Episode 17 ===
Dado further tells that Shah Baba killed Sikandar. Hearing about his death, his wife died in shock. Shah Baba initially puts Meesha in prison. Suddenly all good things happen in Shabad. So Shah Baba decides to keep Meesha with her. Saifullah, being kind, first pleads with him to release Meesha. But when he rejects, he takes Meesha away from Shahbad. Mayer wants to go to washroom, so he insists Meesha to come along. At station, due to Mayer, both miss their train. Farjad decides to elope with Aimee. Both Meesha and Mayer reaches Shahbad on foot. Reaching there, Shah Baba shows his kingdom to Meesha. Dado takes promise from Roman to bring back Meesha. On the way, Roman meets Farjad and Aimee and learns about Shah Baba's plans.

=== Episode 18 ===
While taking a tour, Meesha discovers long, steel chains. When Shah Baba discuss about their dilemma and Meesha's truth, Mayer hears this. However, he is caught and Shah Baba warns him not to tell anything to Meesha, else consequences can be severe. Meesha meets a woman in prison who tells her to escape from Shahbad. Roman telephones Shah Baba about Farjad whereabouts posing himself as his friend. Roman meets Meesha and tells her that he has come to help her. Mayer insists Shah Baba to let him go. Shah Baba agrees on term that he can go after her marriage. When Meesha shows Roman the woman, he tells her all the truth. Roman convinces Shah Baba to bring Farjad by emotionally blackmailing.

=== Episode 19 (last episode) ===
Being unable to convince her, Shah Baba orders Mayer to convince Meesha to marry Farjad and forget Mayer. Roman convinces Meesha to get her out of troubles. Meesha comes to see the true colours of Mayer as he pleads her to marry Farjad in order to save himself. Roman says Meesha to quietly agree to Shah Baba wishes as a part of his plan. Meesha agrees to marry Farjad but on the condition that Mayer must be allowed to return to his home. Meesha is frightened about the upcoming day. Roman asks her to trust him. Before wedding, Meesha finally confesses her feelings towards Roman and Roman also reciprocates his feelings. At night, as Farjad doesn't arrive, Roman reveals his plan. Shah Baba then changes his mind and decides to marry Meesha himself to which Roman protests. Finally Farjad arrives announcing that he has taken over the kingdom and decides to imprison Shah Baba and his faithful.

== Cast ==
- Maya Ali as Meesha/Cinderella
- Osman Khalid Butt as Mayer
- Faizan Khawaja as Rooman
- Eshita Mehboob as Zaini
- Mukarram Kaleem
- Warda Butt as Amy
- Nasreen Qureshi as Granny
- Saba Hameed as Meher
- Hina Khawaja Bayat as Bano
- Laila Zubairi as Suraya
- Rehan Sheikh as Saifullah
- Qavi Khan as Shah Baba

== Production ==
The drama series Aik Nayee Cinderella (her love was not a fairytale) was written by Faiza Iftikhar and directed by Haissam Hussain. It is a production of A & B Entertainment. Maya Ali and Osman Khalid Butt were selected to be the protagonists of the series; Faizan Khawaja and Eshita Mehboob were also selected to be in leading roles and Saba Hameed was selected to be the antagonist. The series also focuses on the novel of Cinderella. The drama was shot in the beautiful areas of Nathia Gali, Pakistan, because of which many people were attracted to the show.

On 13 October 2012, the show finally debuted for its first episode on Geo TV, the show gained great response from the audience and it was among the top dramas of Pakistan. With a total of 19 episodes, the series ended on 13 March 2013. Because of its immense popularity the show aired on another Pakistani Channel, Geo Kahani. It will soon air in India on channel Zee Zindagi. Also, a dhivehi dub of the same drama series was aired on Television Maldives.

=== Filming ===
The filming and shooting of the series took place in beautiful areas of Nathia Gali, Pakistan.

== Reception ==
The drama generated positive reviews with critics calling it "fresh" and "funny". The drama had high rating and was second only to the wildly popular drama Zindagi Gulzar Hai. It generated 6.99 TRPs on average and was aired once again due to its popularity on channel Geo Kahani. Due to its immense popularity it will also air in India soon on channel Zee Zindagi. It is one of the highest-rated Pakistani television series.

=== Awards and nominations ===
Year	Award	Category	Recipient(s)	Result	Ref.
11 January 2014	Pakistan Media Awards	Best Director Drama Serial	Haissam Hussain	Nominated	
11 January 2014	Pakistan Media Awards	Best Drama Writer	Faiza Iftikhar	Nominated	
