= Hum Tehray Gunahgaar =

- Genre: Soap series Romantic; Family drama
- Written by: Zoha Hassan
- Directed by: Ali Masud Saeed
- Starring: Danish Taimoor; Ushna Shah; Farhan Ali Agha; Jia Ali; Mansha Pasha; Mohsin Gillani; Sarah Khan; Anoushay Abbasi; Nazli Nasr; Raeed Muhammad Alam
- Theme music composer: Wajid Saeed
- Opening theme: "Na Janay Kyun" by Sahir Ali Bagga and Sara Raza Khan
- Composer: Sahir Ali Bagga
- Country of origin: Pakistan
- Original language: Urdu
- No. of episodes: 60

Production
- Producer: Momina Duraid
- Production location: Karachi
- Cinematography: Atif Hussain
- Editors: Shahzeb Khakwani; Adnan
- Camera setup: Multi-camera setup
- Running time: 20 minutes

Original release
- Network: Hum TV
- Release: 13 January – 24 April 2014

Hum Tehray Gunahgaar was a 2014 Pakistani Urdu-language soap series that aired on Hum TV. The series was written by Zoha Hassan, directed by Ali Masud Saeed and produced by Momina Duraid of MD Productions. It stars Danish Taimoor, Ushna Shah, Farhan Ali Agha, Jia Ali, Mansha Pasha, Mohsin Gillani, Sarah Khan, Anoushay Abbasi. At 3rd Hum Awards series was nominated for three categories, winning only Best Soap Actor award for Danish Taimoor tied with Imran Aslam for Susraal Mera It also aired in India as prime-time soap on Zee Zindagi

== Outline ==
Gunehgaar is the story of a successful businessman Zakaria, his kind and cancer-stricken wife Aisha, their kids and two adopted children. Zakaria's adopted son Ramal Ali is in love with Malaika and on Malaika's father's insistence, the couple secretly gets married. Owing to her deteriorating condition, Aisha takes some decisions for her children which bring major upheavals in their lives.

== Cast ==
- Danish Taimoor
- Ushna Shah
- Farhan Ali Agha
- Jia Ali
- Mansha Pasha
- Jinaan Hussain as Neha
- Nazli Nasr as Ayesha
- Raeed Muhammad Alam as Waqar aka Vicky
- Mohsin Gillani
- Birjees Farooqui as Ammi Ji
- Sarah Khan
- Anoushay Abbasi

== Accolades ==
At 3rd Hum Awards soap was nominated for following nominations:

- Best Soap Actor - Danish Taimoor (Won)
- Best Soap Actress - Ushna Shah (nom)
- Best Soap Series - Momina Duraid (nom)
