= Haiwan (TV series) =

Pakistani television series

- Urdu: حیوان
- Genre: Social serial Teen drama
- Written by: Sara Sadain Shah
- Directed by: Mazhar Moin
- Starring: Faysal Qureshi; Savera Nadeem; Sanam Chaudhry; Wahaj Ali
- Country of origin: Pakistan
- Original language: Urdu
- No. of episodes: 26

Production
- Producers: Abdullah Seja; Jarjees Seja
- Production location: Karachi
- Running time: 39 - 40 minutes
- Production company: Idream Entertainment

Original release
- Network: ARY Digital
- Release: 10 October 2018 – 2 January 2019

Haiwan (Urdu: حیوان lit. 'Animal') is a 2018 Pakistani drama serial that premiered on 10 October 2018 on ARY Digital. It is directed by Mazhar Moin and written by Sara Sadain Syed. It stars Faysal Qureshi, Savera Nadeem and Sanam Chaudhry. The serial is produced by Abdullah Seja under the production company Idream Entertainment.

The theme of the serial is focused on awareness to parents about child abuse and follow the trend #MyChildMyResponsibility.

== Cast ==
- Faysal Qureshi as Hameed
- Savera Nadeem as Azra
- Sanam Chaudhry as Momina
- Wahaj Ali as Maan
- Maryam Noor as Savera
- Iffat Rahim as Kulsoom
- Shaista Jabeen
- Saife Hassan as Momina and Masooma's father (dead)
- Areesha Ahsan (Child Star) as Masooma
- Syeda Hurain (Child Star) as Javeria "Jojo"

== Awards and nominations ==
Year	Award	Category	Recipient(s)	Result	Ref.
2019	ARY Digital- Social Media Drama Awards 2018	Best Drama Serial -2018	Haiwan	Nominated	
2019	ARY Digital- Social Media Drama Awards 2018	Best Actor Male (Serial)	Faysal Qureshi	Nominated	
2019	ARY Digital- Social Media Drama Awards 2018	Best Actor Female (Serial)	Sanam Chaudhry	Nominated	
2019	ARY Digital- Social Media Drama Awards 2018	Best Supporting Actor (Female)	Iffat Rahim	Nominated	
2019	ARY Digital- Social Media Drama Awards 2018	Best Supporting Actor (Female)	Sawera Nadeem	Nominated	
2019	ARY Digital- Social Media Drama Awards 2018	Best Newcomer (Male)	Wahaj Ali	Won	
2019	ARY Digital- Social Media Drama Awards 2018	Best Childstar	Areesha Ahsan	Won	
2019	ARY Digital- Social Media Drama Awards 2018	Best Childstar	Hoorain	Nominated	
2019	ARY Digital- Social Media Drama Awards 2018	Best Director	Mazhar Moin	Nominated	
