= Meer Abru =

Pakistani television series

- Written by: Farisa Afzal
- Directed by: Furqan Adam
- Starring: Noor Hassan Rizvi; Sanam Chaudhry; Saad Qureshi; Jia Ali; Mirza Zain Baig
- Opening theme: Yeh Mohabbat Hai Kuch Iss Tarah
- Ending theme: Meer-Abru
- Country of origin: Pakistan
- Original language: Urdu
- No. of seasons: 1
- No. of episodes: 34

Production
- Producers: Momina Duraid; Moomal Shunaid
- Camera setup: Multi-camera setup
- Production companies: MD Productions; Moomal Entertainment

Original release
- Network: Hum TV
- Release: 3 April – 7 August 2019

Meer Abru is a 2019 Urdu-language Pakistani television series, co-produced by Momina Duraid and Moomal Shunaid under their banners MD Productions and Moomal Entertainment. The serial aired every Wednesday and Thursday on Hum TV replacing Tu Ishq Hai from 3 April 2019. It starred Noor Hassan Rizvi, Sanam Chaudhry and Saad Qureshi.

== Plot ==
Meer Abru revolves around a middle-class girl, Abru, who tries to win bread for her family, and an upper-class mysterious guy, Meer, who is the owner of Muraad Industries.

Abru lives along with her two younger sisters, Hayaa and Sana who are in university along with their father Ahmed, who teaches at the same university and was about to retire due to which Abru had to get a job at Muraad Industries. However, she was offended of that job because of her boss Meer's attitude. Meer was a mysterious and a serious personality. He was from an upper-class family and lived in a joint family which consisted of his mother, Saira, his father, Ghazanfar, his aunt, Zaibi, his uncle, and two cousins, Saim (who also works along with him at Muraad Industries,) and Waleed (who attends the same university as Hayaa and Sana). However, in the office, Abru met Saim, unaware that he is the cousin of Meer, she complained about his attitude to him. Eventually Saim fell in love with her and so did Meer. However, Abru fell in love with Meer and when Zaibi realised all this, she used the fact for her own selfish purpose and plotted a plan by creating a misunderstanding between Meer and Abru and got Saim married with him due to which, Meer developed hate for Saim and Abru. Abru married Saim because Meer had no trust in her but Saim did trust her. Due to the hate, Meer demanded the partition of Muraad Industries which the whole family objected except Zaibi (who created all those misunderstandings for this purpose).

On the other hand, a side-story of Waleed and Abru's two sister's was going on. One day, when Abru came to the Muraad household for business purposes, Waleed's friend was there who tried to touch her for which Abru slapped him. Waleed got mad at Abru for slapping his friend and insulted her. When Meer learned of the matter, he forced Waleed to apologise to Abru. He did apologise but took the matter seriously and wanted to take revenge. He tried to flirt with both of Abru's sisters but got unsuccessful at Sana. As for Hayaa, he successfully got into a relationship with her. He secretly married her and impregnated her. Later, he started neglecting Hayaa and rejected his unborn baby. Hayaa then attempted suicide but was saved. The whole household then gradually learned about her pregnancy and were really mad at Hayaa. The matter was brought to Waleed's parents and Abru's in-laws and it was proved that Waleed married Hayaa. Meer proved it by finding the marriage papers and he did so because he, according to himself, followed his rules, and truth was one of his rules. Later Hayaa was moved to the Muraad household and Waleed was totally frustrated for that. He even shifted his room to the guest room.

However, as for Abru's own story, her problem was solved, but now, a cousin of Meer and Saira's niece, Maha came to their house from overseas and was best friends with Saim. However, she was way too involved in Saim which started bothering Abru. Turns out that there was really something wrong. Maha was invited by Zaibi (Saim and Waleed's mother) to accomplish her plan to get Saim and Abru separated. One day, when Maha confessed her feelings to Saim, he got mad at her, telling her that he loves Abru and cannot betray her. He said that he loves her (as a friend) which Abru heard as misunderstood Saim thus, Abru, heartbroken, headed to her daddy's home. Circumstances would not have been this worse if Maha made it appear to Abru that Saim is also involved with her.

However, at the same time Abru's younger sister and her sister-in-law, Hayaa was also suffering from hardships. Her husband, Waleed blackmailed her, and treated her like his slave which when Abru saw, got furious at her saying that why does she not take a stand for herself. Upon this, Hayaa starts rejecting Waleed's slavery and realizes her rights.

Later on, Saim proved Maha wrong (that Saim is in a relationship with her) and earned Abru's trust back. When Maha was asked that why did she do such a rash deed, in panic, she lied and blamed Meer for all this. When the lie was discovered by the rest of the whole Muraad lineage, a huge crack was formed between the two brothers, Ghazanfar (Meer's Dad) and Jamaal (Saim's Dad) and thus, the house was splitting up which really made Zaibi excited, even though this wasn't the reason she called Maha for but Maha did accidentally did her this benefit.

During all this situation, the unexpected takes place, leaving the whole household in deep sorrow and pain. All the affairs that were being carried out, stopped. All this happened because a car accident took place in which consisted of Saim and Abru. Abru was doing fine but Saim's condition was really critical. Abru then called Meer who took them to the hospital. There, Saim died, leaving Abru widowed. Abru is then sent to her dad's home.

On the other hand, Zaibi starts brain-washing Hayaa and tells her that Abru is her mortal enemy. Hayaa starts hating Abru. During all this, Abrus father says that he wants his daughter to live with him for some time. There she misbehaves with her sisters and forces them to apologise to her even when they had not done something. One night the electricity goes off and Hayaa blames Abru that she has done that on purpose so that Hayaa suffers. During this, she slips and falls. They take her to the hospital and a baby boy is born. Waleed did not allows Meer to see his son. Hayaa also did not allows Abru to see the young boy and says that she made her slip. Waleed says to Hayaa thank you for giving him such a pleasant thing (his son). Zaibi does not likes the affectionate way, but says nothing.

Waleed was now on Saims seat in Murad Industries after Saim's death. He intentionally makes wrong decisions and then emotionally blackmails Meer to take the blame. After knowing this, Ghazanfar makes Waleed leave and calls Abru who was suffering from unemployment after her father's retirement. She reluctantly joins.

Waleed tells Hayaa about this. Angry, she confronts Abru. Abru leaves the place for Waleed but works there from a different position. Waleed then discovers that his mother has often lied to him. He confronts her and she says that Hayaa is a liar, not her. He scolds her and says that he will not let anyone talk about his wife like that and leaves, leaving Zaibi in shock.

As guilty Maha comes from the overseas again and apologizes Meer for lying. She also tells Waleed and Haya that Abru is innocent and all the fire is by Zaibi.

Hayaa and Waleed apologise to Abru and she happily accepts. She is now living in the Murad house.

One night Sana was out when her car stops in the middle off a deserted place. She calls out for help but accidentally makes some bad people take notice of her. She runs into the nearby forest and not knowing what to do, she calls Meer. He comes there instantly and makes the people leave her home. Abru sees them together and got the wrong idea. She confronts Meer and then Sana. Sana tells her everything and then Abru apologises to Meer who forgives her.

In the end, everyone thinks that Meer and Maha should get married together. On their wedding day, Meer says no to the molvi sahb. Waleed tells everyone that that was their plan and also tells everyone what Zaibi did. She cries and apologises to everyone. Everyone is happy now and Meer and Abru get married.

== Cast ==
- Noor Hassan Rizvi as Meer Murad
- Sanam Chaudhry as Abru Ahmed
- Mirza Zain Baig as Saim
- Saad Qureshi as Waleed Murad
- Zubair Akram as Jamal
- Jia Ali as Zebunnisa (Zebi)
- Srha Asghar as Haya
- Azeem Sajjad as Ghazanfer
- Shajeer Uddin as Professor Ahmed
- Rabya Kulsoom as Sana
