= Banno =

Banno (written: 番野, 坂野 or 伴野) is a Japanese surname. Notable people with the surname include:

- Kuniko Banno (坂野 邦子, born 1957), Japanese swimmer
- Yoshiaki Banno (番野 善明, 1952–1991), Japanese astronomer
- Yoshimitsu Banno (坂野 義光, 1931–2017), Japanese film director
- Yutaka Banno (伴野 豊, born 1961), Japanese politician

== See also ==
- 3394 Banno, a main-belt asteroid
