= Tere Mere Beech =

Pakistani television series

- Genre: Drama, romance, family drama
- Written by: Atiya Dawood
- Directed by: Mohsin Talat
- Starring: Agha Ali; Sanam Chaudhry; Noor Hassan Rizvi; Mariam Ansari
- Opening theme: "Tere Mere Beech Ishq Nadani"
- Original language: Urdu
- No. of seasons: 1
- No. of episodes: 27

Production
- Executive producers: Moomal Shunaid; Kashif Nisar
- Producer: Moomal Entertainment

Original release
- Network: Hum TV
- Release: 29 November 2015 – 29 May 2016

Related
- Kitna Satatay Ho; Kathputli

Tere Mere Beech (Urdu: تیرے میرے بیچ, lit. 'Between You and Me') is a Pakistani drama series. It first aired on 29 November 2015 on Hum TV, replacing the drama Kitna Satatay Ho. It stars Agha Ali, Sanam Chaudhry, Noor Hassan, Saba Faisal, Seemi Pasha, Shaheen Khan, and Hina Khawaja Bayat. It is directed by Mohsin Talat and written by Atiya Dawood. Madhushree sings its theme song.

== Cast ==
- Sanam Chaudhry as Hareem; The adopted daughter of Zahida and Shabir, the biological daughter of Nighat, and the sister of Sadia and Nadia. She later marries Fahad.
- Agha Ali as Fahad; A supposed businessman. He says his family is in Dubai, but he tries to live in Pakistan so he can marry Hareem and grab the property which is in her name.
- Mariam Ansari as Nadia; The older sister of Sadia and Hareem. She used to dislike Hareem. She becomes angry very quickly and has a sharp tongue.
- Noor Hassan as Ali; Surrahya's son, and, later, Nadia's husband.
- Seemi Pasha as Surrahya; Ali's mother.
- Hina Khawaja Bayat as Sharla; A woman who saves Hareem from committing suicide and shelters Hareem at her home.
- Azekah Daniel as Tania; Sharla's daughter, Her behaviour is not so positive towards Hareem. She continue to insist Sharla to throw out Hareem from their home.
- Javeria Ajmal as Areeba
- Tauqeer Ahmed as Asad; Ali's younger brother.
- Saba Faisal as Nighat; The mother of Hareem, Sadia, and Nadia.
- Javed Sheikh as Shabir; The adoptive father of Hareem and the husband of Zahida. He later dies in a car accident.
- Farzana Shafiq
- Tehmina Siddiqui as Sadia
- Sajid Shah as Qadeer; Shabir's brother.
- Shaheen Khan as Zahida; The aunt and adoptive mother of Hareem, as well as the wife of the late Shabir. Nighat gave Hareem to her when Hareem was an infant.

== Plot ==
=== Episode 1 ===
Hareem was adopted as an infant by Zahida, who only thinks of her as a daughter-in-law. Hareem refuses to acknowledge her birth mother, Nighat, who tries to reconcile with her, but visits to enjoy time with her sisters Nadia and Sadia. A shopkeeper, Fahad, shows an interest in her. Hareem's adoptive father, Shabir, is killed in an accident while coming to bring her home.

=== Episodes 2–3 ===
Shabir's brother Qadeer takes charge of Zahida's home, confining her for the iddah, so Zahida sends Hareem to live with her birth family. Hareem overhears that Nadia is soon to marry, and becomes angry that Nighat kept this information from her. Hareem vows to marry a rich man before Nadia's wedding, and befriends Fahad.

=== Episode 4 ===
Hareem tells Fahad that she wants to marry him before Nadia gets married, claiming that she is racing her sister. At the engagement party of Nadia and Ali, Hareem claims that she is Nadia's step-sister, shocking Ali and his mother Surrahya. Upset, Nadia refuses to consider Hareem as her sister. Ali's mother becomes angry and tells Ali not to marry into Nadia's family, as it doesn't know its own relations. However, Ali defends them and his mother accepts the engagement.

=== Episode 5 ===
Ali happens to see Hareem and Fahad in a car; this provokes a fight between Nadia and Hareem. Hareem tells Nighat that Fahad is a businessman with family in Dubai, and that she has to say "yes" when asked about her nikah (Islamic marriage contract). Nighat refuses unless she is sure of the match, so Hareem asks for her marriage to be arranged in court. Hareem goes with Fahad to buy new clothes, and returns to find Zahida visiting and concerned. Hareem calls Zahida "aunt", provoking a fight about whether Zahida is Hareem's mother or aunt. Later, Nadia tells Hareem that Ali learned Fahad doesn't own the shop he works in, angering Hareem and pushing her closer to Fahad.

=== Episode 6 ===
Ali asks his mother why she hasn't invited her friends to celebrate the engagement, concerned for Nadia's feelings. Hareem tells Fahad that she doesn't want to go to her old home because her uncle would confine her, which Fahad expresses guilt over, saying that they will fix that after they marry. Hareem tells Zahida she is taking her jaidad (ancestral property) in place of her uncle, but Zahida warns that Qadeer will kill her, and informs Nighat, who stops Hareem. Nighat notes that they still haven't seen Fahad's home, but Hareem has full faith that it will be good. Hareem goes to Sadia's room, where the sisters reminisce about music and dancing, and they start to regain their former bonds. However, when Nighat asks Sadia and Nadia to expose Hareem, Hareem overhears her and becomes distant, and the family capitulates to her wishes. Hareem is engaged to Fahad before many people, but her friend Areeba ominously asks Fahad about his previous engagement to Areesha.

=== Episode 7 ===
Fahad tells Areeba that she is the only one who knows he is already engaged to Areesha, and warns her that Hareem would be devastated if she found out. Areeba entrusts the matter to Nadia and Sadia, who tell Hareem. Fahad explains that he was not engaged to Areesha, claiming that her brother was his best friend, and tried to set up their marriage. Hareem believes Fahad. Hareem is reluctant to attend Nadia's marriage, but helps to decorate the venue with her sisters. As the second-oldest sister, Hareem receives a gift of Rs 50000 from Ali, which upsets Sadia. The morning after the wedding, discourtesy of Nadia's in-laws upsets Zahida.

=== Episode 8 ===
The newlyweds discuss the problems arising from their differences, now that they are living together. Zahida refuses to go to Nadia's home or her in-laws for the valima (marriage banquet) until Nadia's in-laws apologize and becomes angry with Nighat for not doing the same. Ali's mother, Surrahya, similarly refuses to have dinner with Nadia's family. Nadia meets Ali's younger brother and thinks of him as her brother-in-law. Hareem discusses marriage with Fahad, and asks Nighat to teach her to cook Chinese food for Fahad.

=== Episode 9 ===
Ali's brother Asad returns from a trip abroad. Asad jokes that he'd seen Nadia when she was born, starting an argument. Fahad convinces Hareem to visit Ali's home and try to settle the family differences, but they fight, and Hareem decides on a court marriage. She packs all her belongings, but when Fahad arrives, she tells him to leave. Fahad asks Nighat to accept the marriage, and she does. Meanwhile, Asad has lunch with Hareem and realises that he likes her. Nadia warns Nighat that Asad is a bad man, and says that Hareem should marry Fahad quickly before difficulties arise. With this urgency, Nighat tells Hareem to marry without meeting Fahad's parents.

=== Episode 10 ===
Hareem's wedding is celebrated, and the newly-weds go to a five-star hotel.

=== Episode 11 ===
Fahad becomes tense when a man called Malik wants his borrowed car back from him, and sends Hareem home. Later, Hareem goes to the shop that Fahad supposedly owns, and learns that Fahad is not its owner. Hareem confronts Fahad, who claims to be a partner of the owner, but Hareem doesn't believe him. She asks Nadia to get the details from Ali, and confirms that Fahad is not a partner in the shop. Hareem fights with Fahad, then returns to Nighat's home.

=== Episode 14 ===
Nighat dies of high blood pressure, leaving her daughters and in-laws in shock. Hareem becomes withdrawn and reminisces about Nighat. Nadia and Sadia fight with Hareem, but Hareem doesn't care and remains depressed.

== See also ==
- List of programs broadcast by Hum TV
