= Ghar Titli Ka Par =

Pakistani television series

- Title Card of the serial
- گھر تتلی کا پر
- Genre: Social drama Family drama Love Story
- Written by: Samra Bukhari
- Directed by: Mohsin Talat
- Starring: Sanam Chaudhry; Shahzad Shaikh; Aiman Khan; Ali Abbas
- Country of origin: Pakistan
- Original language: Urdu
- No. of seasons: 01
- No. of episodes: 35

Production
- Producers: Abdullah Kadwani & Asad Qureshi
- Production location: Pakistan
- Running time: Approx 40 Minutes
- Production company: 7th Sky Entertainment

Original release
- Network: Geo Entertainment
- Release: 28 December 2017 – 4 October 2018

Ghar Titli Ka Par (Urdu: گھر تتلی کا پر, lit. 'Home is a Butterfly's Wing') is a 2017 Pakistani television series aired on Geo Entertainment on 18 December 2017. It is produced by Abdullah Kadwani and Asad Qureshi under 7th Sky Entertainment. The serial stars Sanam Chaudhry, Aiman Khan and Shahzad Shaikh in lead roles.

The serial is about a betrayal disguised in friendship. It was popular throughout its run and gained high ratings.

== Plot ==
The story revolves around two college friends Shafaq (Aiman Khan), who belongs to a noble and rich family, and Anji. Shafaq's family includes her father Atta, her mother Naheed and her brother Kamran. Kamran is engaged to his cousin Iram. Shafaq's family also has a close relationship with Naheed's sister (Shafaq and Kamran's aunt) and her son Hassan. Hassan likes Shafaq but has never been able to express those feelings to anyone.

Shafaq is kind-hearted and is loved by everyone, and she is also quite rich, whereas Anji is poor and greedy. The latter takes pleasure in troubling others. She considers herself to be the prettiest woman on earth and flirts with a waiter to constantly eat free food from his restaurant. She also takes a lot of money from him along with his jewelry. In addition to this, she flirts with a nearby grocery store owner and resultantly manages to get ration and luxury items for free. Along with all this she constantly demands gifts and pizzas from a married neighbor. The reason for her befriending Shafaq is also just of the latter's money, because innocent Shafaq gifts her expensive things and also always pays for her at the college canteen.

Anji soon understands that she can get easily rich if she marries Shafaq's brother, Kamran so she cleverly starts luring him and his family and flirting with him. Kamran is already engaged to his childhood fiancée, and cousin, Iram, who is very kind and loving and is very close to Shafaq also. But still, Kamran falls into Anji's trap but Shafaq's father gets to know of it and quickly calls Iram to their house and tells her the whole situation and asks her to be alert and handle the situation. Anji is also very smart and she makes Shafaq start to hate Iram and trouble her and throw her out of the house. Soon, due to Iram's efforts and wisdom, Kamran soon understands Anji's true colours but still they're not able to make Shafaq know about Anji's truth. Iram and Kamran marry.

Anji repeatedly provokes Shafaq to take her revenge on Iram, and then marries an orphan boy of a well-to-do family in Lahore.

Two years later, Aftab tries to be a good husband to Anji but Anji is always rude to him. She doesn't look after her two children, Bunto and Munni. Her Bua (maid) is taking care of the entire house.

Shafaq also marries Azir and they shift to Lahore. The friends reunite in Lahore and seeing Azir richer and more handsome than her own husband, she gets so jealous of Shafaq that she tries to break her marriage. She tries hard to lure her husband and she is successful in doing so. Azir kicks Shafaq out of his own house in front of Anji. At the same time, Irum shows up and she takes Shafaq with her to Karachi.

After coming to Karachi Shafaq becomes pregnant with Azir's child. Irum tries to tell Azar the truth about Anji and also tells him about his upcoming baby. But he heard nothing and said he would only come to take his baby. Azar tells this to the good news, but Angie tells him that Shafaq is lying because if this were true then Shafaq would tell you herself.

One day when Anji and Azir go for dinner they happen to bump into the same waiter whom Anji used to flirt by telling her name as Shafaq. The waiter recognizes Anji and starts telling her cheating stories to Azir. Azir realises his wife is innocent and Anji is evil. He leaves Anji and Anji goes back to her mother's place. Azir pleads with Shafaq but she refuses to forgive him for cheating her and throwing her out of the house.

== Cast ==
- Sanam Chaudhry as Anjum/Anji
- Aiman Khan as Shafaq
- Shahzad Shaikh as Aazir
- Ali Abbas as Kamran (Erum's husband and Shafaq's brother)
- Yashma Gill as Erum (Kamran's wife)
- Ali Ansari as Aftab (Anjum's husband)
- Humaira Bano as Razia (Anji's mother)
- Maryam Mirza as Naheed (Shafaq's mother)
- Shajeer ud din as Atta (Shafaq's father)
- Birjees Farooqui as Simi (Shafaq's aunt)
- Mabsira Khan as Shahida (Erum's mother)
- Ramsha Akmal as Lubna (Anjum's younger sister)
- Mizna Waqas as Faakhira (Anjum's elder sister)
- Arsalan Raja as Hassaan
- Seemi Pasha as Aazir's mother

== Soundtrack ==
Ghar Titli Ka Par OST

Soundtrack album by Sahir Ali Bagga
- Released: 22 December 2017
- Recorded: 2017
- Genre: Television soundtrack
- Length: (5:22)
- Language: Urdu
- Label: Geo Entertainment

Music video
- "Ghar Titli Ka Par" OST on YouTube

The title song was sung by Sahir Ali Bagga and has more than 3 million views on YouTube. He also composed the music.
