= 23rd Lux Style Awards =

2025 Pakistani entertainment awards

- Sponsored by: Unilever Pakistan
- Date: 27 April 2025
- Location: Digital
- Country: Pakistan
- Hosted by: Sarmad Khoosat

Highlights
- Most awards: Kabuli Pulao (5)
- Most nominations: Kabuli Pulao (6); Tere Bin (6)
- Best Film: Gunjal
- Best Television Play: Tere Bin
- Song of the Year: "Tera Mera Hai Pyar" - Ahmed Jahanzeb
- Fashion Model of the Year: Jaweria Ali
- Website: https://www.luxstyle.pk/

The 23rd Lux Style Awards was an award ceremony presented by Lux to honour the best in fashion, music, films and 2023 in Pakistani television, took place on 27 April 2025 in a digital mode. Instead of holding a full event, Sarmad Khoosat was roped in to announce the winners of the season.

Initially scheduled to take place on 7 May 2025 in Lahore, the ceremony was called off due to the security reasons arises from the 2025 India–Pakistan conflict. Like every year, artists were honoured in Fashion, Film and Television and their titles were virtually announced.

Gunjal led the ceremony among the films by winning three awards while Kabuli Pulao won five awards, highest for any television production.

== Winners and Nominees ==
The submissions were announced in the third week of January with final nominations being announced on 5 April 2024.

=== Film ===
Best Film (Viewers' Choice)	Best Film (Critics' Choice)
Gunjal; Babylicious; Chikkar; John; Teri Meri Kahaniyaan	Gunjal; Wakhri; Chikkar; John; Teri Meri Kahaniyaan
Best Film Actor	Best Film Actress
Wahaj Ali - Teri Meri Kahaniyaan; Ahmed Ali Akbar - Gunjal; Fawad Khan - Money Back Guarantee; Muneeb Ali - Sanak; Sheheryar Munawar - Teri Meri Kahaniyaan	Romaisa Khan - John; Hira Mani - Teri Meri Kahaniyaan; Mehwish Hayat - Teri Meri Kahaniyaan; Ramsha Khan - Teri Meri Kahaniyaan; Syra Yousuf - Babylicious
Best Film Director	Best Film Song
Shoaib Sultan - Gunjal; Babar Ali - John; Nabeel Queshi - Teri Meri Kahaniyaan; Nadeem Baig - Teri Meri Kahaniyaan; Zaheer Uddin - Chikkar	Kahaniyaan -Teri Meri Kahaniyaan; Andhera - Gunjal; Baaghi - Wakhri; Chitthiyan - John; Ding Dung - Gunjal

=== Television ===
Best TV Play (Viewers' Choice)	Best Ensemble Play (Critics' Choice)
Tere Bin (Geo Entertainment); Kuch Ankahi (ARY Digital); Mein (ARY Digital); Mujhe Pyaar Hua Tha (ARY Digital); Tere Ishq Ke Naam (ARY Digital)	Kabli Pulao (Green Entertainment); Baby Baji (ARY Digital); Kuch Ankahi (ARY Digital); Razia (Express Entertainment); Sar e Rah (ARY Digital)
Best Television Actor (Viewers' Choice)	Best Television Actor (Critics' Choice)
Wahaj Ali - Tere Bin (Geo Entertainment); Bilal Abbas - Kuch Ankahi (ARY Digital); Hamza Sohail - Fairy Tale 1 (Hum TV); Imran Abbas - Tumharey Husn Kay Naam (Green Entertainment); Khushhal Khan - Mohabbat Gumshuda Meri (Hum TV)	Ehteshamuddin - Kabli Pulao (Green Entertainment); Farhan Saeed - Jhok Sarkar (Hum TV); Khushhal Khan - Mohabbat Gumshuda Meri (Hum TV); Mikaal Zulfiqar - Jaisay Aapki Marzi (ARY Digital); Wahaj Ali - Tere Bin (Geo Entertainment)
Best Television Actress (Viewers' Choice)	Best Television Actress (Critics' Choice)
Yumna Zaidi - Tere Bin (Geo Entertainment); Ayeza Khan - Mein (ARY Digital); Hania Amir - Mujhe Pyaar Hua Tha (ARY Digital); Saba Qamar - Tumharey Husn Kay Naam (Green Entertainment); Sajal Ali - Kuch Ankahi (ARY Digital)	Sabeena Farooq - Kabli Pulao (Green Entertainment); Ramsha Khan - Jannat Se Aagey (Geo Entertainment); Iqra Aziz - Mannat Murad (Geo Entertainment); Saba Qamar - Tumharey Husn Kay Naam (Green Entertainment); Yumna Zaidi - Tere Bin (Geo Entertainment)
Best Television Director	Best Television Writer
Kahif Nisar - Kabli Pulao (Green Entertainment); Ahmed Bhatti - Sar e Rah (ARY Digital); Haseeb Hassan - Jannat Se Aagey (Geo Entertainment); Nadeem Baig - Kuch Ankahi (ARY Digital); Syed Wajahat Hussain - Mannat Murad (Geo Entertainment)	Zafar Mairaj - Kabli Pulao (Green Entertainment); Mohammed Ahmed - Kuch Ankahi (ARY Digital); Nadia Akhtar - Mannat Murad (Geo Entertainment); Naila Ansari - Jaisay Aapki Marzi (ARY Digital); Umera Ahmed - Jannat Se Aaagey (Geo Entertainment)
Best Television Long Play	Best Emerging Talent in Television
Mayi Ri (ARY Digital); Baby Baji (ARY Digital); Dil Hi Tou Hai (ARY Digital); Ehsaan Faramosh (ARY Digital); Sirf Tum (Geo Entertainment)	Mamya Shajaffar - College Gate (Green Entertainment); Aina Asif - Mayi Ri (ARY Digital); Romaisa Khan - Hadsa (Geo Entertainment); Samar Abbas - Mayi Ri (ARY Digital); Shuja Asad - College Gate (Green Entertainment)
Best Television Track
Kya Hoti Hai Bewafai - Tere Bin (Geo Entertainment); Ankhain - Kabli Pulao (Green Entertainment); Fairy Tale 1 - Fairy Tale 1 (Hum TV); Mujhe Pyaar Hua Tha - Mujhe Pyaar Hua Tha (ARY Digital); Tumharey Husn Kay Naam - Tumharey Husn Kay Naam (Green Entertainment)

=== Music ===
Song of the Year	Singer of the Year
"Dhun" - Sunny Khan Durrani, Inqalab; "Bewafaa" - Nayyab; "Lesson" - Abdullah Khan; "Tu Hai Kahan" - Aur; "Wishes" - Hasan Raheem, Umair, Talwiinder	Ahmed Jahanzeb - "Tera Mera Hai Pyar"; Nehaal Naseem - "Beaadra"; Sunny Khan Durrani - "Geet"; Talha Anjum - "Downers At Dusk"; Usama Ali - "Long Time No See"
Most Streamed Song of the Year	Music Producer of the Year
"Tera Mera Hai Pyar" - Ahmed Jahanzeb; "Lesson" - Abdullah Khan; "Shikayat" - Aur; "Tu hai kahan" - Aur; "Wishes" - Hasan Raheem, Umair, Talwiinder	Abdullah Siddiqui - "Wakhri"; Abdullah Kasumbi - "Hungama"; Mekaal Hasan - "Chamba Kitni Dur"; Sharif Awan - "Music in Covid Times"; Umair - "Wishes"
Artist of the Year	Most Stylish Musician of the Year
Bayaan - "Sapna"; Aur - "Tu Hai Kahan"; Hasan Raheem - "EP : Maybe, It's Love"; Natasha Noorani - "Matlabi - Wakhri Version"; Young Stunners - "Benz"	Aima Baig - "Satrangi"; Faisal Kapadia - "Jadu"; Meesha Shafi - "Saranjaam"; Talha Anjum - "Open Letter"; Rovalio - "Sapna"

=== Fashion ===
Best Emerging Talent	Fashion Model of the Year
Maleena Mansoor; Abid Bangash; Amaz Butt; Ghulam Nabi; Hussain Rajput	Jaweria Ali; Abeer Asad Khan; Eesha Asad; Sauban Umais; Suleman Hussain
Best Fashion Stylist	Fashion Hair & Makeup Artist Of The Year
Hussain Ejaz; Hafsa Farooq	Shainal Parwaiz; Arshad Khan; Syed Hussain; Umar Aziz
Fashion Forward Brand Of The Year	Fashion Photographer Of The Year
Hussain Rehar; Fahad Hussayn; HSY; Munib Nawaz; Sania Maskatiya	Aleena Naqvi; Asad Bin Jawed; Ayaz Anis; Gul Ansari; HM Studio
Fashion Videographer Of The Year
Omer Khalid Butt (OKB Films); Furqan Bhatti; Usman Mehar Films
