= Ghisi Piti Mohabbat =

Pakistani televisions series

- Title card
- Urdu: گھسی پٹی محبت
- Genre: Romance; Dark comedy
- Written by: Fasih Bari Khan
- Directed by: Ahmad Bhatti
- Starring: Ramsha Khan; Wahaj Ali; Shahood Alvi; Ali Abbas; Danial Afzal
- Opening theme: "Peeche Hatna Nahin" by Saniya, Muqaddas, and Shehnaaz
- Ending theme: "Hum Nahin Sudhrainge" by Saniya, Muqaddas, and Shehnaz
- Composer: Soch
- Country of origin: Pakistan
- Original language: Urdu
- No. of episodes: 25

Production
- Producer: Abdullah Seja
- Production locations: Karachi, Sindh, Pakistan
- Running time: 36-40 minutes (episode 1-22); 74-76 minutes (episode 23-25)

Original release
- Network: ARY Digital
- Release: 6 August 2020 – 21 January 2021

Ghisi Piti Mohabbat (Urdu: گھسی پٹی محبّت, lit. 'Worn Out Love') is a Pakistani dark humor television series produced by Abdullah Seja under the banner iDream Entertainment. It premiered on 6 August 2020 on ARY Digital. Written by Fasih Bari Khan of Quddusi Sahab Ki Bewah fame, it stars Ramsha Khan as the protagonist whereas Wahaj Ali, Shahood Alvi, Ali Abbas, and Danial Afzal as second leads.

== Plot ==
The serial follows the life of an independent girl, Samia (Ramsha Khan), who works as a chef at a restaurant. She gets married a second time after her first divorce as her first husband, Rizwan (Wahaj Ali) was cheating on her. Her second husband, Khalil (Shahood Alvi) is murdered by his first wife on their wedding night. After his death, Samiya marries Basharat (Ali Abbas), a young guy who works with Samia and lives with his widowed sister-in-law, Amtul (Javeria Abbasi) and nephew, Salman (Zuhab Khan). A little while after their wedding Salman dies. After his death, Basharat feels bad for his sister-in-law, Amtul and decides to marry her. This time, again it becomes difficult for Samia to pursue her marital life due to Amtul's interference and she decides to leave Basharat, disappointing her mother. She also loses her job when the restaurant shuts down and she is forced to search for a new job. It is very difficult for her to hold onto any job because she is harassed wherever she goes, so she decides to open her own restaurant and succeeds in it. A new guy named Uzair (Danial Afzal Khan) comes into her life and asks her to marry him but she rejects him as she sees his flirting nature with another woman.

In the end, Samia decides to live her life as an independent girl. She doesn't want to marry anyone anymore and wants to pursue her dreams independently.

== Cast ==
- Ramsha Khan as Samia Anwar
- Wahaj Ali as Rizwan, Samia's first husband
- Shahood Alvi as Khalil, Samia's second husband (dead)
- Ali Abbas as Basharat, Samia's third husband
- Danial Afzal Khan as Uzair, Samia's neighbor
- Saba Faisal as Fareeda, Samia's mother
- Sajeer Uddin as Anwar, Samia's father
- Samina Ahmed as Tanveer Fatima, Samia's phuppo (aunt)
- Aliha Chaudry as Asmara, Samia's younger sister
- Areesha Ahsan as Tashi, Samia's youngest sister
- Saba Hameed as Aziza Sultana, Rizwan's mother
- Saife Hassan as Naheed, Rizwan's father
- Sana Askari as Farhat Parveen, Rizwan's sister
- Arjumand Rahim as Noor, Rizwan's friend
- Hareem Sohail as Saman, Noor's daughter
- Umar Cheema as Bilal, Rizwan's friend
- Farah Nadir as Bilal's mother
- Zahid Qureshi as Bilal's father
- Afshan Qureshi as Nafeesa Sherwani, Khalil's mother
- Shaheen Khan as Farkhnda, Khalil's first wife
- Hamid Naveed as Yasir, Khalil and Farkhanda's son
- Javeria Abbasi as Amtul, Bsharat's sister-in-law
- Zuhab Khan as Salman, Amtul's elder son (dead)
- Beena Chaudhary as Bee, Uzair's elder sister
- Abul Hassan as Shoaib, Asmara's husband
- Zohaib Mirza as Riz, writer and Tashi's friend
- Fareeda Shabbir as Rubeena, Shoaib's mother
- Nida Khan as Chanchal, a famous actress
- Faakhir Mehmood as Dr.Ali

== Production ==
The show was earlier named as Meri Chaar Shadiyaan ('My Four Weddings') but later it was changed to Ghisi Piti Mohabbat. The writer of the show, Faseeh Bari Khan revealed in an interview that it is based on a true story.

Wahaj and Ramsha made their second on-screen appearance together in this serial after their appearance in Mah-e-Tamaam (2018).

== Reception ==
=== Critical reception ===
While reviewing for DAWN Images, Sadaf Haider praised the series for challenging cultural norms, satire, performances of Ramsha Khan, Saba Hamid, Wahaj Ali and Shahood Alivi, but criticized for portraying the male lead as weak and fickle, perpetuating stereotypes. Zeinab Masud of The Friday Times praised the series for effectively conveying several pertinent messages while entertaining the audience.

In an year-ender article by DAWN Images, the series was listed among the best television series of the year.

=== Ratings ===
Episode	Date	TRP	Ref.
1	6 August 2020	4.5	
3	20 August 2020	6.2	
4	27 August 2020	3.61	
6	10 September 2020	5.2	
9	1 October 2020	6.4	
14	5 November 2020	6.3	
15	12 November 2020	6.9	
16	19 November 2020	7.5	
17	26 November 2020	6.2	
18	3 December 2020	5.2	
19	10 December 2020	5.8	

== Awards and nominations ==
Date of ceremony	Awards	Category	Recipient	Result	Ref.
March 2021	ARY People's Choice Awards	Favorite Drama Serial - Regular	Ghisi Piti Mohabbat	Nominated	
March 2021	ARY People's Choice Awards	Favourite Director	Ahmed Bhatti	Nominated	
March 2021	ARY People's Choice Awards	Favourite Actress	Ramsha Khan	Won	
March 2021	ARY People's Choice Awards	Favourite Damad	Wahaj Ali	Nominated	
March 2021	ARY People's Choice Awards	Favorite Maa	Saba Faisal	Won	
March 2021	ARY People's Choice Awards	Favourite Saas	Saba Hamid	Nominated	
March 2021	ARY People's Choice Awards	Favourite Sasur	Saife Hassan	Nominated	
March 2021	ARY People's Choice Awards	Favourite Behan	Aliha Chaudry	Nominated	
March 2021	ARY People's Choice Awards	Favourite Jodi	Ramsha Khan & Wahaj Ali	Nominated	
March 2021	ARY People's Choice Awards	Favorite Writer	Fasih Bari Khan	Won	
March 2021	ARY People's Choice Awards	Favourite OST	Ghisi Piti Mohabbat	Nominated	
November 5, 2021	Pakistan International Screen Awards	Best TV Serial	Ghisi Piti Mohabbat	Nominated	
November 5, 2021	Pakistan International Screen Awards	Best Television Director	Ahmed Bhatti	Nominated	
November 5, 2021	Pakistan International Screen Awards	Best Television Actress (Jury)	Ramsha Khan	Nominated	
November 5, 2021	Pakistan International Screen Awards	Best Supporting Actress	Arjumand Rahim	Nominated	
November 5, 2021	Pakistan International Screen Awards	Best Writer	Fasih Bari Khan	Nominated	
