= Arjumand Rahim =

Pakistani television actress (born 1980)

- Born: Karachi, Sindh, Pakistan
- Other name: Arjumand Raheem
- Education: New York Film Academy
- Occupations: Actress; director; producer
- Years active: 1995 – present

Arjumand Rahim (Urdu: ارجمند رحیم) is a Pakistani television actress, director and producer. She has been seen in different television serials on different channels. She is best known for her character "Pari" in Suno Chanda 2.

== Early life ==
Arjumand was born in Karachi, Pakistan and completed her secondary education from St. Michael's Convent School. Later, she went to DHA Degree College for Women and considered joining Liberal Arts and graduated with a degree in Arts. Then she went to New York City and attended New York Film Academy to study direction and got a degree in direction.

== Career ==
Rahim started her career as an actress in 1995 from her college. Later in 2004, she started acting in many serials. In 2006 she opened her own production house "Art Republik". Under the banner, she produced Shahrukh Khan Ki Maut, the first film in the series which she produced called Paristar, and was screeened at the Kara Film Festival. For the television, she produced the drama serial Dil Ki Madham Boliyan, written by Syed Mohammad Ahmed. Her next production was the drama series Hotel for TV One. In 2015–16, she played the leading role of Mashal Chaudhry who inherits her husband's political legacy in PTV Home's Aangan Mein Deewar. In 2021, she received praise for her performance in Syed Ahmed Kamran's directorial Phaans as a courageous mother who stands up against her sexual abuser son. In 2023, her brief role of a train passenger in the short film "Ek Sau Taeeswan" in anthology Teri Meri Kahaniyaan was praised by critics.

== Filmography ==
=== Film ===
Year	Title	Role	Notes	Ref.
2005	Shahrukh Khan Ki Maut	—N/a	Producer	
2015	Manto	Nazneen		
2018	Saving Ayra Ali Khan	Ayra		
2022	Carma – The Movie	Haya Ali Khan		
2023	Teri Meri Kahaniyaan	Mrs. Qutub-ud-Din	Segment: "Aik So Teeswaan"	
2025	Welcome to Punjab			

=== Television ===
Year	Title	Role	Notes	Ref.
1998	Qurut-ul-Ain	Sonia		
1999	Neeli Dhoop	Naveeda		
2000	Woh Kaun Hai	Resham		
2002	Thori Khushi Thora Ghum	Malaika		
2003	Ishq Aatish	Irene		
2004	Nasl	Nazish		
2007	Aurat Aur Char Devari	Suraiya	Episode "Cactus Ka Phool"	
2008	Hotel		Producer	
2008	Chaudhween Ka Chand	Sheera Khan		
2009	Azar Ki Ayegi Baraat	Soniya	Guest appearance	
2010	Ambulance	Eman		
2011	Dil Behkay Ga	Sahira		
2011	Ladies Park	Rubina		
2011	Akhri Barish	Chanda		
2012	Bari Aapa	Firdous "Choti Aapa"		
2012	Mann Ke Moti	Sara Rahil		
2013	Rishtay Kuch Adhooray Se	Aaliya		
2013	Billo Bablu & Bhaiyya	Alizeh		
2013	Kitni Girhain Baaki Hain	Seemi		
2014	Chup Raho	Minal		
2014–15	Kaneez	Bibi Murshid		
2015	Zara Si Bhool	Saira		
2015	Aangan Mein Deewar	Mashal Chaudhry		
2016	Mann Mayal	Cookie		
2017	Manto	Bulwant Kaur		
2018	Kabhi Band Kabhi Baja	Faryal	Episode 9: "Meri Bholi Begum"	
2019	Suno Chanda 2	Parveen "Pari" Mughal		
2020	Ghisi Piti Mohabbat	Noor		
2021	Phaans	Nadia		
2022	Hum Tum	Ulfat Qutub ud Din		
2023	College Gate	Zoya		
2023	Kuch Ankahi	Seema Suhrawardy	Guest appearance; Episode 18	
2023	Khel	Nafeesa		
2024	Dil Pe Dastak	Yasmin		
2024	Ghair	Hawwa		
2024	Jafaa	Nazia		
2024	Bharam	Arjumand		
2025	Silsila	Bibi Murshid		
2025	Sher	Shahtaj "Taj" Bibi		
2025	Meri Zindagi Hai Tu	Nafeesa		
2026	Raja London Ka			
2026	Zabt	Shamsa Begum		

=== Telefilm ===
Year	Title	Role	Notes
2019	In Se Miliye	Andaleeb	Telefilm

=== Other appearances ===
Year	Title	Role	Notes
2005	1st Indus Drama Awards	Presenter	
2005	Ariel Mothers	Herself	
2010	Nestlé Nido Young Stars	Herself	

=== Web series ===
Year	Title	Role	Notes
2020	Dastak Na Do	Nausheen	
2021	Midsummer Chaos	Maryam	
2024	Abdullahpur Ka Devdas	Afaaf	

== Awards and nominations ==
Year	Award	Category	Result	Title	Ref.
2012	PTV Award	Best Supporting Actress	Won	Dil Behkay Ga	
2022	Pakistan International Screen Awards	Best Supporting Actress	Nominated	Ghisi Piti Mohabbat	
