= Biryani (TV series) =

2025 Pakistani television series

- بریانی
- Genre: Romance, Drama
- Written by: Zafar Mairaj
- Directed by: Badar Mehmood
- Starring: Ramsha Khan; Khushhal Khan; Sarwat Gilani; Yousuf Bashir Qureshi; Laila Wasti; Mahnoor Parvez
- Country of origin: Pakistan
- Original language: Urdu
- No. of episodes: 35

Production
- Producers: Fahad Mustafa; Dr. Ali Kazmi
- Production company: Big Bang Entertainment

Original release
- Network: ARY Digital
- Release: 12 August – 9 December 2025

Biryani is a 2025 Pakistani romantic drama television series directed by Badar Mehmood and written by Zafar Mairaj. It is produced by Fahad Mustafa and Dr. Ali Kazmi under the Big Bang Entertainment banner. The series stars Ramsha Khan, Khushhal Khan and Sarwat Gilani in the lead roles and premiered on ARY Digital on 12 August 2025.

== Plot ==
Nisa (Ramsha Khan), a senior student in a BBA programme, is assigned to mentor a freshman, Mir Meeran (Khushhal Khan). Meeran comes from a conservative feudal family and seeks to break free from its constraints through his growing friendship with Nisa. What begins as a reluctant mentorship gradually develops into a romance. The relationship is disrupted when Nisa discovers that Meeran is already married to Gul Meher (Sarwat Gilani), a revelation that leads to heartbreak, mistrust and conflict among the three principal characters.

== Cast ==
Actor	Character
Ramsha Khan	Nisa Majeed
Khushhal Khan	Mir Meeran
Sarwat Gilani	Gul Meher
Yousuf Bashir Qureshi	
Laila Wasti	
Mahnoor Parvez	
Farzana Munir	
Javed Rizvi	

== Production ==
Badar Mehmood previously directed Cheekh (2019) and Kabhi Main Kabhi Tum (2024), both produced under the Big Bang Entertainment banner for ARY Digital. Writer Zafar Mairaj had earlier written Kabuli Pulao and Dampukht.

== Reception ==
A review in Dawn's Images supplement described the series as "a love story with all the right ingredients" and praised the performances of both lead actors, noting that their chemistry made viewers "forget Khushhal and Ramsha — they only see Meeran and Nisa." The review identified Sarwat Gilani's portrayal of Gul Meher as a standout performance.
