= Nausheen Shah =

Pakistani actress

- Born: Karachi, Pakistan
- Occupation: Actress
- Years active: 2009–present

Nausheen Shah is a Pakistani actress. She is known for playing the character of Dua in the acclaimed series Pani Jaisa Piyar (2013) and Noor Jehan in Hum TV's Rehaai (2013). Her other notable appearances include Mera Pehla Pyar (2012), Sartaj Mera Tu Mera (2015), Mann Chalay (2009), Khud Parast (2018), Deewar-e-Shab (2019) and Tarap (2020). She also has a role in the unreleased film Jhol.

== Career ==
Shah's career began with modeling. She has appeared in popular TV advertisements for companies such as Warid Telecom, Habib Bank and First Women's Bank.

She later appeared in popular television drama serials such as Shaista Shaista, Mannchalay, Rehaai and Pani Jaisa Piyar. Shah will make her film debut in the upcoming Jhol, in which she will play the character of Chandani (wife of Ali Azmat's character).

== Filmography ==
=== Film ===
Year	Title	Role	Notes	Ref
2019	Two+Two	Chandni	Filming	
2020	Once Upon a Time in Karachi	TBA	Release postponed due to COVID-19	

=== Television ===
Year	Title	Role	Notes	Ref
2006	Main aur Tum	Nausheen	Sitcom	
2009–2010	Meri Zaat Zarra-e-Benishan	Aqsa		
2009–2010	Mannchalay	Mehnaz		
2010	Shaista Shaista	Shaista		
2011	Pani Jaisa Piyar	Dua		
2011	Dugdugi	Nausheen; Durdana's daughter		
2012	Mera Pehla Pyar	Aisha		
2012	Shehryar Shehzadi			
2012	Sasural Ke Rang Anokhay	Recurring		
2012	Bulbulay	Herself	Special appearance	
2012	Mera Saaein 2	Erum		
2013	Rehaai	Noor Jehan		
2013	Kabhi Kabhi	Eva; Eishal's sister		
2013	Kitni Girhain Baaki Hain	Recurring		
2013	Kahin Chand Na Sharma Jaye	Mishal's sister	Telefilm	
2014	Apnay Hee Rang Mein			
2014	Meka Aur Susral	Sajila		
2014–2015	Zid	Zainab; Zee		
2015	Bojh			
2015	Sartaj Mera Tu Raaj Mera	Shehla		
2015	Choti Si Ghalat Fehmi			
2015	Aik Aur Aik Gyarah			
2015	Bus Ek Sanam Chahiye		Telefilm	
2016	Wafa			
2016	Manchahi	Herself	Special appearance	
2016	Khushboo Ka Safar			
2016	Kitni Girhain Baaki Hain 2	Raheela	Episode 22	
2017	Zoya Sawleha	Shahwaar		
2017	Ghari Do Ghari			
2018–2019	Khud Parast	Beenish		
2019	Deewar-e-Shab	Nagina		
2020	Tarap	Faiqah		
2020	Bikhray Moti	Faizah	Special appearance	
2021	Pehli Si Muhabbat	Ishrat		
2021	Bebasi	Mahrukh		
2023	Dhoka	Arsala		
2024	Kitni Girhain Baaki Hain	Najma		
2024	Jaan-e-Jahan	Rehana		
