= Ishq Ibadat (2015 TV series) =

- Written by: Seema Ghazal
- Directed by: Fahim Burney
- Starring: Resham; Anum Fayyaz; Farhan Saeed; Shafqat Cheema; Wahaj Ali; Irfan Khoosat; Mariya Khan
- Opening theme: Jab Hum se tum khabo me the mile
- Country of origin: Pakistan
- Original language: Urdu
- No. of episodes: 49

Production
- Producers: Concepts & Fahim Burney
- Running time: 15–20 minutes

Original release
- Network: Hum TV
- Release: 21 July – 13 October 2015

Ishq Ibadat (Urdu: عشق عبادت, lit. 'Love is Worship') is a 2015 Pakistani romantic drama serial. It is based on a novel of Seema Ghazal, and was first broadcast by Hum TV on 21 July 2015. The series was directed by Fahim Burney and produced by Concepts & Fahim Burney. It stars Resham, Wahaj Ali and Anum Fayyaz in lead roles.

== Cast ==
- Resham Sobia
- Wahaj Ali as Sahil
- Anum Fayyaz as Rano
- Mariya Khan as Zoya
- Shafqat Cheema
- Irfan Khoosat
- Fareeha Jabeen
- Khalid Butt
- Tariq Tayyab
- Raheela Agha as Khala Jan
- Asma Abbas
- Arsalan Rafiq

== Production ==
Wahaj Ali played the lead in the series, marking his acting debut.

== Awards ==
- 4th Hum Awards – Hum Award for Best Actress-Soap – Resham
