= Sabeena Farooq =

Pakistani actress

- Born: Sabeena Farooq; Islamabad, Pakistan
- Education: Springfield School
- Occupation: Actress
- Years active: 2016–present

Sabeena Farooq is a Pakistani actress who primarily works in Urdu television.She gained recognition for portraying Haya in Tere Bin. Sabeena then received praise for portraying Barbeena in Kabuli Pulao (2023) and Aliya in Mann Jogi (2024). Kabuli Pulao won her the Lux Style Award for Best TV Actress - Critics' Choice.

== Early life ==
Farooq was born in Islamabad to a Punjabi father and a Pashtun mother, one of three siblings (with one sister and one brother), and after graduating in Media Studies she auditioned for a role with PTV and made her acting debut in 2016 with Dhanak starring Nauman Ijaz.

== Career ==
Farooq has played the female lead in a number of television productions, including Maa Sadqey (2018), Suno Chanda 2 (2019) and Log Kiya Kahenge (2018). Her other appearances include De Ijazat (2018) and Salaam Zindagi (2018). She gained recognition for her role in Tere Bin (2022–23). Sabeena's lead role in the drama Kabuli Pulao (2023) is among her latest work.

== Filmography ==
=== Films ===
Year	Title	Role	Notes	Ref(s)
2016	Janaan	Imaan	Acting Debut	

=== Television ===
Year	Title	Role	Network	Notes	Ref(s)
2018	De Ijazat	Zoha	Hum TV	Television Debut	
2018	Maa Sadqay	Sofia	Hum TV	Supporting Role	
2019	Suno Chanda 2	Romaina "Maina" Khan	Hum TV	Supporting Role	
2019	Log Kia Kahengay	Mishal Feroze Arsal	Hum TV	Supporting Role	
2020	Muqaddar	Abeera	Geo Entertainment	Supporting Role	
2020	Kashf	Zoya Wajdan	Hum TV	Supporting Role	
2021	Mohlat	Rida Essa	Geo Entertainment	Supporting Role	
2022	Dil Awaiz	Fariya	Geo Entertainment	Supporting Role	
2022	Tere Bin	Haya Ikram Khan	Geo Entertainment	Supporting Role	
2023	Kabuli Pulao	Barbeena Haji Mushtaq	Green Entertainment	Started in Lead Role	
2024	Mann Jogi	Aliya Ibrahim	Hum TV	Mini Series	

=== Web series ===
Year	Title	Role	Notes	Ref(s)
2019	Aye Zindagi	Sehar	Dot Republic Media series	

== Awards and nominations ==
Year	Award	Category	Work	Result	Ref(s)
2023	1st Kya Drama Hai Icon Awards	Best Performance in a Negative Role - Popular	Tere Bin	Nominated	
2023	1st Kya Drama Hai Icon Awards	Best Actress (Critics' Choice)	Kabuli Pulao	Won	
2023	1st Kya Drama Hai Icon Awards	Best Actress (Popular Choice)	Kabuli Pulao	Nominated	
2025	23rd Lux Style Awards	Best TV Actress – Critics' Choice	Kabuli Pulao	Won	
2025	2nd Kya Drama Hai Icon Awards	Best Actress (Critics’ Choice)	Mann Jogi	Nominated	
