= Thora Jee Le =

- Film poster for Thora Jee Le
- Directed by: Rafay Rashdi
- Written by: Rafay Rashdi
- Produced by: Mahtab Akbar Rashdi
- Starring: Rizwan Ali Jaffri; Ramsha Khan; Bilal Abbas; Fatima Shah Jillani; Kasim Khan; Ahsan Mohsin Ikram; Salman Faisal
- Cinematography: Zayer Hassan
- Music by: Suhaib Rashdi
- Production companies: 1. 1NFLUENCE Production & Rafay Rashdi Films
- Release date: 20 January 2017
- Running time: 145 minutes
- Country: Pakistan
- Language: Urdu
- Box office: PKR 35,00,000 (world Wide)

Thora Jee Le (Urdu: تھوڑا جی لے, lit. 'Live a little') is a 2017 Pakistani coming-of-age feature film, written and directed by Rafay Rashdi. The film is produced by Mahtab Akbar Rashdi. The cast includes Rizwan Ali Jaffri, Bilal Abbas, Ramsha Khan, Syeda Fatima Shah Jillani, Ahsan Moshin Ikram, Kasim Khan and Salman Faisal. It is a story about self discovery, friendship, trust, and connection between friends, who venture on a journey of a lifetime only to discover that, fate has different plans for all of them. It released on 20 January 2017.

== Plot ==
This film takes place in contemporary Karachi and Larkana, centering around seven people with vividly different backgrounds, Rizwan Ali Jaffri, as Kaizaad, a rich business man and philanthropist, Ramsha Khan as Misha, an aspiring business woman who is taught the value of owning up to responsibility with time, Bilal Abbas as Party, a passionate rebel who puts desire before logic and lives for thrill of the party, Salman Faisal as Andy, a lighthearted and humorous guy who wants to be the fun in everyone’s life, Fatima Jilani as Bahaar, the high class, fashion conscious girl, looking for the man of her dreams, Qasim Khan as T.C, who is serious and envious but very a blunt person with the anger that requires just a match stick to light and Ahsan Mohsin Ikram as Azaad, a family oriented man, loving and caring husband to Misha who is relentlessly supportive and loyal to her.

== Cast ==
- Ahsan Mohsin Ikram as Azaad
- Rizwan Ali Jaffri as Kaizaad
- Ramsha Khan as Misha
- Bilal Abbas Khan as Party Khan
- Fatima Shah Jillani as Bahaar
- Qasim Khan as T.C
- Salman Faisal as Andy

== Production ==
=== Filming ===
The principal photography began in July 2016 in Karachi and proceeded to Larkana. Some portions of the film were shot later in September 2016.

== Release ==
A teaser for the film was released online on 17 November 2016. The film was released all over Pakistan on 20 January 2017.

== Music ==
The music of this film is directed by Suhaib Rashdi. Suhaib along with Sumair and Royal Law composed the melody of the six songs that are in the film’s album. Vocalists Midhat Hidayat and Royal Law lent their voices for the songs.
