= Khushhal Khan (actor) =

Pakistani actor (born 2000)

- خوشحال خان
- Born: Khushhal Khan Khattak; March 2, 2000 (age 26); Nowshera, Khyber Pakhtunkhwa, Pakistan
- Occupations: Model; Actor
- Years active: 2021–present
- Height: 1.82 m (6 ft 0 in)
- Spouse: Ramsha Khan (m. 2026)

Khushhal Khan Khattak, known professionally as Khushhal Khan, is a Pakistani television actor, model and boxer. Khan is known for portraying Saim Ibrahim in Muhabbat Gumshuda Meri, Faraz in Mushkil and Shahmir Adam in Duniyapur. He is the recipient of a Hum Award. In 2025, he played Mir Meeran Zamaan in ARY Digital's Biryani.

== Early life and family ==
Khan belongs to a Pashtun Khattak family originally from Nowshera village Ameer and lives in Islamabad. His family traces its roots to Khushal Khattak, the 17th-century political figure, poet and one of the most influential names in Pashto literature.

== Career ==
=== Model ===
Khan began modeling and earned a name for himself in the profession. In 2020, Khan received a Hum Style Awards Rising Model award.

=== Actor ===
He made his acting debut in the same year with Qissa Meherbano Ka. He went on to appear in the dramas Bebasi (2021), Mushkil (2022), Wehshi (2022) and the telefilm Aik Hai Nigar, also in 2021.

Khan received recognition in 2023, with his portrayal of Saim in Muhabbat Gumshuda Meri opposite Dananeer Mobeen. The drama won him the Hum Award for Best Actor Popular. In 2024, Khan made his film debut with Poppay Ki Wedding and appeared in the web series Barzakh in a special appearance. He then played the titular role in the mini-drama series Yahya.

Khan has since received praise for portraying Shahmir opposite Ramsha Khan, in Duniyapur. The series is the costliest drama made in the history of Pakistani television.

In 2025, Khan appeared in Green Entertainment's Ramadan special television series Ishq Di Chashni, along with Sehar Khan. The same year, he reunited with Ramsha Khan for ARY Digital's drama Biryani.

=== Boxing ===
In January 2025, Khan made his amateur boxing debut during the International Boxing Event held in Lahore, as part of the co-main event fight, triumphing over his opponent Bashar Khan with a knockout.

== Filmography ==
=== Films ===
Year	Title	Role	Notes	Ref.
2024	Poppay Ki Wedding	Poppa	Film debut	

=== Television ===
Year	Title	Role	Network	Director	Notes	Ref(s)
2021	Qissa Meherbano Ka	Ayaz Atif Ali Mehtaab	Hum TV	Iqbal Hussain	Supporting role	
2021	Bebasi	Sahir	Hum TV	Barkat Siddiqui	Supporting role	
2022	Mushkil	Faraz	Geo Entertainment	Marina Khan	Lead role	
2022	Wehshi	Asif	Hum TV	Iqbal Hussain	Lead role	
2023	Muhabbat Gumshuda Meri	Saim Ibrahim	Hum TV	Shahid Shafaat	Lead role	
2024	Duniyapur	Shahmir Adam	Green Entertainment	Shahid Shafaat	Lead role	
2024	Yahya	Yahya Mashkoor Hussain	Geo Entertainment	Shehrazade Sheikh	Lead role	
2025	Ishq Di Chashni	Sheikh "Sherry" Shehryar	Green Entertainment	Shahid Shafaat	Lead role	
2025	Biryani	Mir Meeran Zaman	ARY Digital	Badar Mehmood	Lead role	
2026	Winter Love	Hayat	Hum TV	Danish Nawaz	Lead role	

=== Telefilms ===
Year	Title	Role	Network	Notes	Ref(s)
2021	Aik Hai Nigar	Shahid	ARY Digital	Supporting role	

=== Web series ===
Year	Title	Role	Network	Notes	Ref(s)
2021	Midsummer Chaos	Sameer	Qissa Nagri	Acting debut	
2024	Crossroads	Burak	DRM	Mini-series	
2024	Barzakh	Jafar Khanzada (young)	Zindagi	Special appearance	
2026	Jo Bachay Hain Sang Samait Lo †	Zain Shehryar	Netflix	Completed	

== Awards and nominations ==
Year	Award	Category	Work	Result	Ref.
2020	6th Hum Style Awards	Best Emerging Talent – Model	—N/a	Won	
2023	1st Sukooon Kya Drama Hai Icon Awards	Best Actor - Popular	Muhabbat Gumshuda Meri	Nominated	
2024	9th Hum Awards	Best Actor Popular	Muhabbat Gumshuda Meri	Won	
2024	9th Hum Awards	Best On-screen Couple Popular (with Dananeer Mobeen)	Muhabbat Gumshuda Meri	Nominated	
2025	24th Lux Style Awards	Best Emerging Talent of the Year – Drama	Duniyapur	Won	
2026	3rd Pakistan International Screen Awards	Best Actor - TV (Popular)	Duniyapur	Nominated	
