= Nadaan (TV series) =

2024 Pakistani television miniseries

- Genre: Drama
- Showrunner: Sultana Siddiqui
- Written by: Saji Gul
- Directed by: Mehreen Jabbar
- Starring: Ahmed Ali Akbar; Ramsha Khan
- Theme music composer: Zara Madani & Faisal Kapadia
- Country of origin: Pakistan
- Original language: Urdu
- No. of seasons: 1
- No. of episodes: 8

Production
- Running time: ~37 minutes
- Production companies: Moomal Entertainment; MD Productions

Original release
- Network: Hum TV
- Release: 5 October – 23 November 2024

Nadaan is a 2024 Pakistani television miniseries directed by Mehreen Jabbar, written by Saji Gul, and produced by Sultana Siddiqui, marking her return to production after several years. It was the second series in Sultana's trilogy on mob violence followed by Mann Jogi. The series features Ahmed Ali Akbar and Ramsha Khan in lead roles. It premiered on Hum TV on 5 October 2024, with its final episode airing on 23 November 2024.

== Plot ==
Set in Jam Nagar, Karachi, the story follows SHO Haider and Dr. Tabeer as they struggle against superstition, corruption, and drug abuse. Dr. Tabeer, who helps revive the local Roshni Civil Hospital, discovers that Tayyab, assistant to the influential faith healer Pir Subhan, is secretly supplying drugs disguised as medicine. With Haider's help, an investigation is launched.

After a young girl dies from drug addiction, tensions rise between the hospital and Pir Subhan's followers. When Tayyab is overlooked as Pir Subhan's successor, he poisons Pir's medicine, causing his death. To hide his crime, Tayyab spreads false rumors blaming Dr. Tabeer, leading an angry mob to target her. SHO Haider protects her while investigating the case.

Evidence eventually proves that Tayyab poisoned Pir Subhan. He is exposed by Kamar, Pir Subhan's educated successor, and is arrested after a confrontation with Haider. Dr. Tabeer is cleared of all accusations.

In the end, Jam Nagar begins to change for the better: a rehabilitation ward is opened for drug addicts, Pir Subhan's wife starts educating young girls, Kamar becomes the new MPA, and Dr. Osama chooses public service over politics. Haider earns a promotion for his bravery, and the story ends on a hopeful note as he and Dr. Tabeer walk away together.

== Cast ==
- Ahmed Ali Akbar as SHO Haider Khan
- Ramsha Khan as Doctor Tabeer Aslam
- Hammad Shoaib as Doctor Osama
- Tahir Jatoi as Pir Subhan
- Kashif Hussain as Tayyab : Pir Subhan's right hand
- Sajid Shah as MPA Bashara Kapadia : Dr. Osama's father and politician
- Farah Nadeem as Zoya: Dr. Tabeer's mother
- Ali Gul Mallah as Inspector Sami : policeman assisting SHO Haider
- Ahmed Randhawa as DSP Mushtaq Hussain

== Themes ==
It focuses on themes such as drug addiction, mob mentality, the repercussions of misinformation through fake images, mob violence, and the peoples of the underprivileged areas who falls prey of the elements who claim to provide treatment through prayers and amulet.

== Production ==
The series was originally intended to title as "Banay Hum Nadaan Kyun?". It marked director Mehreen Jabbar's foray to serious societal issues, departing away from themes such as family, relationships, and marriage.

== Reception ==
The drama was positively received. It was praised as gripping and the performances were positively reviewed. Ahmed Ali Akbar and Ramsha Khan's performances were commended along with the supporting cast by the critics, making the plot and the story relatable. People loved the ending of the mini-series.

Gaitee Ara Siddiqi of The News International noted the several issues portrayed in the series stating that the series "had an engaging beginning".
