= Mann Jogi =

2024 Pakistani television miniseries

- Genre: Drama
- Showrunner: Sultana Siddiqui
- Written by: Zafar Mairaj
- Directed by: Kashif Nisar
- Starring: Bilal Abbas Khan; Sabeena Farooq; Gohar Rasheed
- Theme music composer: Sahir Ali Bagga
- Country of origin: Pakistan
- Original language: Urdu
- No. of seasons: 1
- No. of episodes: 9

Production
- Running time: ~37 minutes
- Production companies: Moomal Entertainment; MD Productions

Original release
- Network: Hum TV
- Release: 3 August – 28 September 2024

Mann Jogi (Urdu: من جوگی, lit. 'Hermit Heart') is a 2024 Pakistani television miniseries directed by Kashif Nisar, written by Zafar Mairaj, and produced by Sultana Siddiqui, marking her return to production after several years. It was the first series in Sultana's trilogy on mob violence followed by Nadaan and Tan Man Neel o Neel. The series features Bilal Abbas Khan, Sabeena Farooq and Gohar Rasheed in lead roles. It premiered on Hum TV on 3 August 2024, with its final episode airing on 28 September 2024. The series explores the exploitation of the Islamic practice of Nikah Halala by individuals for personal gain.

== Plot ==
Chaudhary Shabbir, a prominent politician in a small locality, had married the love of his life, Aliya. However, their union was short-lived, as they divorced in a fit of anger. When Shabbir's mother found out, she forbade them from reuniting, declaring Aliya unlawful for Shabbir.

Seeking a solution, they consulted local Moulvi Hafiz Ilyas, who suggested Nikkah Halala, a controversial Islamic practice. Aliya was married off to Ibrahim, the muezzin of the neighborhood mosque, who had lost his family in an earthquake and now lived with the Moulvi.

On their wedding night, Aliya attempted suicide, but Ibrahim saved her, and they eloped together. The next morning, Shabbir arrived to bring Aliya back, only to discover they were gone. He called Aliya's brother, who denied any knowledge of their whereabouts. However, Aliya eventually returned and recounted the entire ordeal to her brother and sister-in-law.

She shared with them how her mother-in-law had initially mocked her for being divorced, repeatedly implying that Shabbir wasn't entirely to blame. Shabbir had manipulated Ibrahim into marrying and consummating the marriage, with the intention of divorcing her so he could remarry her himself. After recounting her story, she firmly refused to return to Shabbir.

However, her sister-in-law harbored doubts and expressed them to her husband, suggesting that perhaps no divorce had taken place and that she had simply eloped due to an illicit affair.

Her brother calls Shabbir there, but the couple learns of his intentions and leaves the house. They go to Yousuf, a keeper of the church and a friend of Aliya's father, who died while saving Yousuf from an extremist mob when she was young. Yousuf's wife, Mariam, goes to Aliya's house to find out the situation there. However, Shabbir's mother also comes there and doubts that Aliya has taken shelter with them. Shabbir goes there but finds nobody. He humiliates Yousuf, but he firmly refuses to tell him about Aliya, emphasizing that she is with her husband. After leaving the church, Aliya and Ibrahim take a bus journey but get separated when the journey ends.

They go to Yousuf's daughter, Anita, who works in a call center and lives in a hostel. She manages to hide them in the hostel, but the couple gets caught by the warden, who punishes them to work without pay for one month, doing tasks such as plumbing, cleaning, and other household chores. On the other hand, Shabbir again goes to Yousuf and Mariam and tries to ask them about her address, but they remain tight-lipped.

After completing their sentence, Ibrahim and Aliya's dedication impresses the warden, who offers them permanent positions at the hostel. Anita, recognizing their struggles, intervenes to improve their circumstances and relationship. She advises Aliya to foster Ibrahim's independence, encouraging her to empower him to stand on his own.

Anita also secures a job for Ibrahim, but he quits due to Aliya's concerns about leaving him alone. However, their quiet life is disrupted when Aliya's friend, the wife of Shabbir's political rival, discovers them at a hotel. Misinformed about Aliya's marital status, she assumes Aliya is having an affair, betraying Shabbir, unaware that he had previously divorced her.

Shabbir, alerted by his rival, senses deception and contacts the policeman investigating the false robbery case against Ibrahim. He orders a deeper probe into the mystery surrounding Ibrahim's situation.

== Cast ==
- Bilal Abbas Khan as Mohammad Ibrahim (Aaliya's husband)
- Sabeena Farooq as Aaliya Ibrahim (Shabbir's ex-wife & Ibrahim's wife)
- Gohar Rasheed as Chaudhary Shabbir (Aaliya's ex-husband)
- Asma Abbas as Mrs. Chaudhary (Shabbir's mother)
- Adnan Shah Tipu as Hafiz Ilyas
- Syed Tanveer Hussain as Yousuf Masih
- Tahira Imam as Mariyam Yousuf (Yousuf's wife)
- Shehrezade Sheikh as Anita Yousuf (Mariyam & Yousuf's daughter)

== Production ==
The project was developed by Sultana Siddiqui who collaborated with director Kashif Nisar. They chose writer Zafar Mairaj to tackle the sensitive topic of halala. The series was first announced by Gohar Rasheed in April 2024 via his Instagram, who was selected to portray the antagonist, Chaudhary Shabbir. Sabeena Farooq was chosen to portray the female lead, a character navigating marriage, divorce, and halala, leveraging her understanding of feminine emotions despite not having personal experience with these specific situations. Asma Abbas was cast in the character of Chaudhary Shabbir's mother.

The post-production work of the series completed in July. It premiered on August 3, 2024 on Hum TV.

== Reception ==
Owing to the strong feminist approach of the series, a viewer, as quoted in DAWN Images, found the series "hard to watch", describing it as "the dream of an extreme feminist".

=== Critical reception ===
Gaitee Ara Siddiqi of The News International found the series "brilliantly acted and scripted", stating it as "a welcome change from the usual fare."
