= Mariya Khan =

Pakistani actress

- ماریہ خان
- Born: 5 October 1988 (age 38); Quetta, Pakistan
- Education: St. Joseph's Collage (B.A)
- Occupations: Actress; Model; Host; Voice actress
- Years active: 2000 – present

Mariya Khan is a Pakistani actress, model, host and voice actress. She is known for her drama roles in Baba Jani, Hari Hari Churiyaan and Hiddat.

== Career ==
She joined the industry in 2000. She hosted shows on Kay2 TV channel, and Suno Pakistan FM 89.4. She also did voice acting, for Urdu dubbing of many Turkish dramas and also at ARY Digital. She started her acting in 2009 at PTV channel. She also appeared in British film Kandahar Break as Ayesha. She did lead roles in PTV dramas such as Moum and Daag-e-Nadamaat. She is also known for her role in drama Waada with Faysal Qureshi and also in drama Mere Jevan Sathi. She was praised for playing both negative and positive characters. She has also done modeling for many designers, companies and magazines. She appeared in drama Hari Hari Churiyaan as Nausheen in 2017. In 2018 she appeared in the drama Baba Jani, Meri Guriya and Ishq Mein Kaafir.

== Filmography ==
=== Television series ===
Year	Title	Role	Network
2008	Mushkbar	Hamida	PTV
2008	Mehman	Zarina	ARY TV
2009	Lagay na Jiya	Ayesha	PTV
2010	Moum	Dr.Zoono	PTV
2011	Akhri Barish	Aqeela	Hum TV
2012	Maseeha	Aiman	Hum TV
2012	Daag e Nadamat	Zeema	PTV
2013	Urdu Bechari	Najwa	PTV
2014	Koi Deepak Ho Chingari	Rusba	Express Entertainment
2014	Rothi Rothi Zindagi	Zainab	Express Entertainment
2014	Darbadar Tere Liye	Aleen	Hum TV
2015	Ishq Ibadat	Zoya	Hum TV
2015	Mere Jevan Sathi	Sumbul	ARY Digital
2016	Mohay Piya Rang Laga	Aiza	ARY Digital
2016	Shaheliyaan	Noor's sister-in-law	ARY Digital
2016	Rishta Anjana Sa	Esha	ARY Digital
2016	Champa Aur Chambeli	Alina	Geo Kahani
2016	Bechari Mehrunnisa	Nudrat	Geo TV
2016	Izn-e-Rukhsat	Novera	Geo Entertainment
2017	Mazaaq Raat	Herself	Dunya News
2017	Hiddat	Asma	Geo Entertainment
2017	Hari Hari Churiyaan	Nausheen	Geo TV
2018	Meri Guriya	Jahan Ara	ARY Digital
2018	Ishq Mein Kaafir	Javeria	A Plus
2018	Aye Dil tu Bata	Beenish	Geo TV
2018	Mein Muhabbat Aur Tum	Azra	Play TV
2018	Baba Jani	Rakhshanda	Geo Entertainment
2019	Mera Qasoor	Samara	ARY Digital
2019	Zara Sambhal Ke	Mehwish	A Plus
2019	Piya Naam Ka Diya	Shaheen	Geo Entertainment

=== Film ===
Year	Title	Role
2009	Kandahar Break	Ayesha
2013	Za Pakhtoon Yum	Sajjida

== Awards and nominations ==
Year	Award	Category	Result	Presented by	Ref.
2018	PTV Awards	Best Actress	Won	PTV National Awards Committee	
