= Ishq Mein Kaafir =

Pakistani television series

- Goher Mumtaz (left) and Saboor Aly
- Genre: Social drama Family drama Love Story
- Written by: Dilshad Naseem
- Screenplay by: Umera Ahmed
- Directed by: Amir Yousuf
- Starring: Saboor Aly; Goher Mumtaz; Saba Faisal; Mariya Khan
- Country of origin: Pakistan
- Original language: Urdu
- No. of episodes: 33

Production
- Producer: Kashif Kabeer
- Production location: Lahore
- Running time: Approx 40 Minutes

Original release
- Network: A-Plus TV
- Release: 27 August 2018 – 8 April 2019

Ishq Mein Kaafir (Urdu: عشق میں کافر, lit. 'Infidel in Love') is a 2018 Pakistani drama serial which aired on A-Plus TV. The drama features Saboor Aly and Gohar Mumtaz and was first aired on 27 August 2018.

== Story ==
The story revolves around black magic and its effects on society. The main lead Ujala loves her university fellow Fahad and wants to marry him. Another of her dreams is to become a qualified doctor. She takes the help of Taweez to fulfil her dreams. On the other hand, Fahad doesn't like her. He is in love with Dua. Ujala wants to get the love of Fahad by hook or crook.

Unfortunately, Ujala gets Fahad and becomes his wife but Fahad likes her but still has feelings for dua, when Fahad learns that Ujala has got him with wrong means of black magic he gets upset and leaves her and takes her little daughter away from her too. In the end Fahad marries his love Dua and Ujala who was using wrong means to get her love, left all alone and depressed. Moral of the story is that, nobody can gain anything with wrong doings and unfair means of Black magic.

== Cast ==
- Saboor Aly as Ujala
- Gohar Mumtaz as Fahad
- Saba Faisal as Salima
- Mariya Khan
- Sadia Faisal as Urooj
- Mohsin Gillani as Samiullah
- Waseem Tirmazi as Raza
- Ayesha Khan
- Aymi Khan as Maryiam
- Humayun Gull
- Saima saleem
- Mariam Shafi
- Momina Iqbal as Dua
- Fakhar Zaman
- Syeda Mahreen Shah
- Ponam Anwar
- Aitzaz Bajwa
- Iqra Qaiser
- Iqra Kanwal
