= Hari Hari Churiyaan =

2017 Pakistani television serial

- Title screen
- Genre: Family drama Love Story
- Written by: Jahanzeb Qamar
- Directed by: Syed Atif Hussain
- Starring: Aiman Khan; Wahaj Ali
- Theme music composer: Waqar Ali
- Opening theme: Rahat Fateh Ali Khan
- Country of origin: Pakistan
- Original language: Urdu
- No. of episodes: 28

Production
- Producer: Zeeshan Khan
- Production locations: Nathia Gali, Pakistan
- Running time: Approx 40 Minutes
- Production company: TNI Productions

Original release
- Network: Geo Entertainment
- Release: 1 August 2017 – 7 February 2018

Hari Hari Churiyaan (lit. 'Green Bangles') is a Pakistani drama serial written by Jahanzeb Qamar and directed by Syed Atif Hussain. It stars Aiman Khan, Hassan Ahmed and Wahaj Ali in lead. The drama was first aired 1 August 2017 on Geo Entertainment, where it aired every Tuesday at 8:00 P.M.

== Plot ==
Cousins Aiman and Ali have found comfort in staying as silent lovers. The sweet love birds have never been expressive but they have never been worried either. Aiman is very fond of bangles, especially green colors one, and Ali always brings those bangles for her. However, he also realizes the need of a stable career as he does not come with a strong financial background.

When Ali’s parents send a marriage proposal for Aiman, her grandmother intervenes and orders that Aiman should rather be married off to her other cousin, Waqar, someone who lives with his wealthy family in Canada and whose father sends money to Aiman’s grandmother on a monthly basis.

Despite the fact that their relationship was built on doubts rather than trust, Aiman puts her feelings aside with a heavy heart and ties the knot with Waqar. The man she marries looks sensible from his appearance but has happens to have his own toxic traits. Somehow fate brings Ali back in Aiman’s life and Waqar starts doubting her loyalty and begins to torture her physically. However Aiman later stands up to him. In the end Waqar dies. He asks Ali and Aimen for forgiveness. Aiman and Ali get married and live happily ever after.

== Cast ==
- Aiman Khan as Aiman
- Wahaj Ali as Ali
- Hassan Ahmed as Waqar
- Sajid Hassan as Fasahat
- Mehmood Aslam as Shujat (Aiman's father)
- Shagufta Ejaz as Surraya (Aiman's mother)
- Natasha Ali as Zunaira
- Mariya Khan as Nausheen
- Javeria Abbasi as Sheeza
- Hina Rizvi as Guddi
- Qaiser Naqvi as Guddi's mother
- Hardy Firdousi as Gul Khan
- Rabia Tabbassum as Bilqees
- Nazli Nasr as Saleema
- Asad Siddiqui as Kashan
- Naushaba Bashir as Najma
- Fauzia Mushtaq as Shehnaz (Ali's grandmother)
- Ali Deswali as Faraz
- Ali Butt as Zai
- Sharmeen Tayyab as Guddi Baji
- Khalid Butt as Hashim
- Sabahat Ali Bukhari as Salma
