= Khudparast =

Pakistani television series

- Urdu: خود پرست
- Written by: Radain Shah
- Directed by: Aabis Raza
- Starring: Shahzad Shaikh; Ramsha Khan; Nausheen Shah
- Theme music composer: Shani Arshad
- Country of origin: Pakistan
- Original language: Urdu
- No. of episodes: 27

Production
- Producers: Fahad Mustafa; Dr.Ali Kazmi
- Production location: Karachi
- Running time: 39 - 40 minutes
- Production company: Big Bang Entertainment

Original release
- Network: ARY Digital
- Release: 6 October 2018 – 23 March 2019

Khudparast (Urdu: خود پرست) is a 2018 Pakistani romantic drama serial that premiered on 6 October 2018 on ARY Digital. It is directed by Aabis Raza and written by Radain Shah. It stars Shehzad Sheikh and Ramsha Khan in lead roles. The serial is produced by Fahad Mustafa and Ali Kazmi under their production banner Big Bang Entertainment.

== Cast ==
- Shehzad Sheikh as Hanaan
- Ramsha Khan as Uswah
- Nausheen Shah as Beenish
- Asma Abbas as Bakhtawar, Hannan's mother
- Sajida Syed as Zarina, Uswah's mother
- Yasmeen Haq as Maria, Uswah's sister
- Hassan Ahmed as Moiz
- Saife Hassan as Saad, elder brother of Uswah
- Sabahat Adil as Zoya, Saad's wife
- Aamir Qureshi as Umer, Uswah's younger brother
- Fahad Shaikh as Adeel
- Faiza Gillani as Sadia, Umer's wife
- Gul e Rana as Beenish's mother
- Agha Talal

== Awards and nominations ==
Year	Award	Category	Recipient(s)	Result	Ref.
2019	ARY Digital- Social Media Drama Awards 2018	Best Negative Actor (Female)	Asma Abbas	Won	
