= Bebasi =

Pakistani television series

- Genre: Drama
- Written by: Aliya Bukhari
- Directed by: Barkat Siddiqui
- Starring: Ali Rehman Khan; Alizeh Shah; Anoushey Abbasi; Nausheen Shah; Khuashhal Khan
- Opening theme: Sahir Ali Bagga
- Composer: Sahir Ali Bagga
- Country of origin: Pakistan
- Original language: Urdu
- No. of episodes: 30

Production
- Producers: Momina Duraid; Noreen Ali
- Production company: ProMax Media

Original release
- Network: Hum TV
- Release: 12 November 2021 – 3 June 2022

Bebasi (Urdu: بے بسی, lit. 'Helplessness') is a 2021 Pakistani television series co-produced by Momina Duraid and Noreen Ali under banners MD Productions and ProMax Media, written by Aliya Bukhari and directed by Barkat Siddiqui. It features Ali Rehman Khan and Alizeh Shah in lead roles along with Anoushey Abbasi, Nausheen Shah, Khushhal Khan and Shagufta Ejaz in supporting cast.

== Cast ==
- Alizeh Shah as Ifrah
- Ali Rehman Khan as Ahmar
- Khushhal Khan as Sahir
- Anoushey Abbasi as Nadia
- Nausheen Shah as Mahrukh
- Hina Rizvi as Azra, Ifrah's mother
- Ayesha Khan as Shabana
- Farhan Ally Agha as Sajid, Ifrah's father
- Ismat Zaidi as Ifrah's grandmother
- Jawed Sheikh as Sahir's father
- Salma Asim as Sahir's mother
- Waseem Abbas as Tameezuddin
- Shagufta Ejaz as Ishrat Jahan
- Eshal Fayyaz as Naila "Neeli"
- Seemi Pasha

== Production ==
In August 2021, director Barkat Siddiqui shared the details of his upcoming project including the cast. During the production phase, Lekin (Urdu: لیکن, lit. 'However') was used as the serial's working title.
