= Meri Guriya =

Television series

- Genre: Drama; Crime
- Written by: Radain Shah
- Directed by: Ali Hassan
- Starring: Sania Saeed; Sonya Hussain; Mohsin Abbas Haider; Mariya Khan
- Ending theme: guriya
- Country of origin: Pakistan
- Original language: Urdu
- No. of seasons: 1
- No. of episodes: 25

Production
- Producers: Fahad Mustafa; Dr. Ali Kazmi
- Production company: Big Bang Entertainment

Original release
- Network: ARY Digital
- Release: 27 June – 3 October 2018

Meri Guriya (transl. My doll) is a Pakistani Urdu-language crime drama television series that premiered on 27 June 2018, on ARY Digital. The series is co-produced by Fahad Mustafa and Dr. Ali Kazmi for Big Bang Entertainment. It stars Sania Saeed, Sonya Hussain and Mohsin Abbas Haider.

The series revolves around the social and economic issues of citizens in Pakistani society. Meri Guriya highlights deeply rooted problems in Pakistan, particularly child abuse.

== Plot ==
The show opens with 8-year-old Arifa being sexually abused and murdered, pushing her town into chaos. The story shifts to Shehnaz, a mother of three daughters, all of whom have been deemed "bad luck" by their paternal grandmother. Due to their financial issues, the youngest daughter, Abida, is not able to attend school and instead goes to a madrasa. This results in Shehnaz and her husband deciding to arrange a rickshaw to ferry the children to school. At the same time, Dabeer, an innocent and sensitive boy, is resisting his arranged marriage to Safeena, a state level badminton player. Although Safeena has told Dabeer to not come close to her, she begins to have feelings for him. Consequently, Dabeer avoids her as much as possible. Safeena and Abida soon become good friends after Abida calls Safeena "dulhan".

Later in the series, it is revealed that Dabeer has been murdering the young girls of this town and now has his eyes on Abida. One day when returning from school, Abida goes missing. She is later found in the house of Arifa, taken there by her mentally ill mother. Shehnaz's mother in law forces her son to remarry so that he can have a son. A marriage is soon set between her son, Shaheer, who is around 40 years of age, and a young girl of around 16. The girl had been a victim of sexual abuse. On the day of the wedding, Dabeer cons Jahan Ara, the sister in law of Shehnaz who likes Dabeer, and somehow manages to kidnap Abida. Abida goes missing for two days while the police do nothing to help. Later, Abida's body is found on a heap of garbage.

Abida's death leaves a great impact on Shehnaz and Safeena, who weep at the news. This ignites a profound desire for vengeance, as they are tired of society perceiving women as weak and unimportant. They make a video that ends up going viral on the internet. They convince more women who have faced similar injustice to make their voices heard. The men of the town, including the police, try to shut the voices of these women by opening fire on Shaheer's and Shehnaz's house. Everyone comes out unscathed, save for Shaheer who suffers minor injuries. During this period, both Shehnaz and Safeena begin to suspect Dabeer's guilt. Following this, the men of the town again attempt to oppress these women by shooting Safeena. The bullet only grazes her.

Dabeer's sister Samreen somehow discovers his crimes. Dabeer kidnaps her and leaves her to die in an empty house without food or water. He tells everyone that she has eloped with a random man. Safeena, Shehnaz, and Yawar (Dabeer's brother) come to believe that Dabeer is behind all this. Safeena finds out the truth by showing the girl who had once been a victim of sexual abuse a picture of Dabeer. The girl confirms Dabeer was the one who abused her. After this, all the men of the town are forced to have their DNA tested by the police.

Shortly after this, Safeena sees Dabeer going riding his bike and follows him to the abandoned house. Samreen is rescued and Dabeer is arrested. Dabeer is set to stand trial for his crimes, although many people want him to be set free. Sheikh, a prominent member of the town, promises Dabeer's father that he'll hire an expensive lawyer for him in exchange for marriage with Samreen. Dabeer's father agrees, and an esteemed lawyer is set to represent Dabeer. However, even with this lawyer at his defense, Dabeer is found guilty and a law specifying the death by hanging for pedophiles is passed. Safeena files for divorce, but is later kidnapped by the ex-police officer. The drama ends with Dabeer hanged in front of the whole town as he sees the faces of the 12 innocent girls he had killed.

== Cast ==
- Sania Saeed as Shehnaz
- Mohsin Abbas Haider as Dabeer
- Sonya Hussain as Safeena
- Sajid Hassan as Shameer
- Ayesha Khan as Sharifan, Shameer's mother
- Mariya Khan as Jahan Ara
- Ismat Zaidi as Safeena's mother
- Shaista Jabeen as Dabeer's mother
- Faris Shafi as Yawar
- Ismat Zaidi as Safeena's mother
- Tariq Jameel as Safeena's father
- Faiza Gillani as Mrs. Javed (Arfa's mother)
- Ammara Chaudhary as Samreen

== Awards and nominations ==
Year	Award	Category	Recipient(s)	Result	Ref.
2019	ARY Digital- Social Media Drama Awards 2018	Best Negative Actor (Male)	Mohsin Abbas Haider	Won	
2019	ARY Digital- Social Media Drama Awards 2018	Best Supporting Actor (Male)	Faris Shafi	Nominated	
2019	ARY Digital- Social Media Drama Awards 2018	Best Childstar	Bakhtawar	Nominated	
