= Shahrukh Khan Ki Maut =

- شاه رخ خان کی موت
- Directed by: Ehteshamuddin
- Written by: Ehteshamuddin
- Produced by: Arjumand Rahim
- Starring: Tabraiz Shah; Saife Hassan; Sajid Shah; Saleem Mairaj; Rashid Farooqi
- Cinematography: Majid Mumtaz
- Edited by: Syed Tanveer Alam
- Production company: Natasha D'souza
- Release date: 1998 (Pakistan)
- Running time: 55 minutes
- Country: Pakistan
- Language: Urdu

Shahrukh Khan Ki Maut (Death of Shahrukh Khan) is a Pakistani short film directed and written by Ehteshamuddin and produced by Arjumand Rahim under the production banner of her company Natasha D'souza. Th film aired in 2005. It stars Saife Hassan, Tabraiz Shah, Sajid Shah, Aqeel Ahmed, Mehmood Bhatti, Sajid Rafi, Saleem Mairaj, Rashid Farooqi, Sara Umer, Yahya Rashdi, Imran Ali, Shaheer, Shoaib Khan and Arif Khan. The film follows the life of Murad, who is inspired by Bollywood actor Shah Rukh Khan and wants to be like him.

== Cast ==
- Saife Hassan as Shamshad
- Tabraiz Shah as Murad a.k.a. Shah Rukh Khan
- Sajid Shah as Hair Dresser
- Aqeel Ahmed as James (Bond)
- Mehmood Bhatti as Constable Ali
- Sajid Rafi as Murad's father
- Rashid Farooqi as Ustad Manzoor
- Sara Umer as Murad's sister
- Yahya Rashdi as Mehmood
- Imran Ali as Salesman (Video Shop)
- Shaheer as Saleem
- Shoaib Khan as Akhbar Wala
- Arif Khan as Arif bhai
