= Zabt (TV series) =

2026 Pakistani television series

- Genre: Family drama
- Written by: Saima Akram Chaudhry
- Directed by: Tahseen Khan
- Starring: Sachal Afzal; Zoha Tauqeer; Daniyal Khan
- Country of origin: Pakistan
- Original language: Urdu
- No. of episodes: 41

Production
- Producer: Erum Binte Shahid
- Production locations: Karachi, Pakstan
- Camera setup: Multi-camera setup

Original release
- Network: Geo Entertainment
- Release: 1 June – 13 July 2026

Zabt is a Pakistani television drama series written by Saima Akram Chaudhry and directed by Tahseen Khan. Produced by Erum Binte Shahid, it was broadcast on Geo Entertainment in 2026. The series features Sachal Afzal, Zoha Tauqeer and Daniyal Khan in leading roles. The series premiered on 1 June 2026 and concluded on 17 July 2026.

== Plot ==
Zabt follows two families whose constant disagreements create tension between them. Despite the rivalry, their children, Ayla and Ehtisham, fall in love, but their relationship faces strong opposition from both families. Meanwhile, Aoun secretly hides his feelings for Ayla. Aoun's birthday takes an unexpected turn when he ends up at the police station, triggering fresh arguments within the family. Shami's actions also leave Ayla deeply hurt and disappointed. Ayla is later humiliated at home because of Ehtisham's lies. Deeply upset by what happens, she misunderstands Aoun's intentions and directs her anger toward him. Rimla attempts to get closer to Aoun, but he rejects her and makes his position clear. Meanwhile, Ayla suffers the consequences and is blamed for the incident, resulting in her being barred from attending university. Aoun and Ayla are robbed while returning home, leaving their families frightened and concerned. Soon afterward, Ayla discovers that she is pregnant, leaving her deeply worried. She repeatedly tries to tell Shami about her pregnancy but faces obstacles each time and cannot share the news. Meanwhile, Arifa creates a major family dispute over Ayla's growing closeness with Shami. Shami pressures Ayla to terminate her pregnancy, explaining that he cannot marry her at present. During this difficult period, Aoun becomes a source of support for her. Arifa's accusation against Aoun creates chaos within the family, eventually prompting Bi Jaan to leave the house with him. Meanwhile, Ayla remains anxious about her pregnancy.

A major family scandal erupts when Ayla's secret is exposed, shocking everyone. Shami protects himself by denying the truth and allowing Ayla to take all the blame. Saqib's health deteriorates because of the controversy surrounding Ayla's character within the household. Overwhelmed by the situation, Ayla attempts to take her own life. She confronts Shami and demands that he tell the truth, but he refuses to acknowledge what happened and denies everything. In a shocking development, Arifa forces him to sign the divorce papers concerning Ayla. Ayla runs away from home but loses her unborn child after falling during Aoun's attempt to stop her. Meanwhile, Arifa happily moves forward with her plans and arranges the engagement of Ehtisham and Rimla. As their engagement approaches, Rimla asks Ehtisham to reject the proposal, but he cannot gather the courage to stand against his parents. With no other option, she approaches Ayla and reveals that she is in love with Aoun. Ayla struggles to cope with the humiliation of her divorce as Arifa and Sarwari continue spreading damaging rumours about her. Meanwhile, Bi Jaan helps Saqib and Aoun become involved in the family business. Instead of holding an engagement celebration, Arifa surprises everyone by forcing Ehtisham and Rimla into marriage. Ayla is deeply hurt when she learns about the sudden development. Ehtisham escapes to Dubai, while Rimla and her friend make plans to free her from the forced marriage without sacrificing her claim to the factory. Meanwhile, a new suitor offers Ayla an opportunity to begin a new life abroad and accepts her despite her past. Rimla and Shami's marriage faces growing difficulties because of the factory dispute and the possibility of divorce. At the same time, Saqib and his family begin preparing for Ayla's wedding.

Ayla persuades Aoun to allow Rahat to return to Pakistan. Meanwhile, Rimla becomes increasingly frustrated as tensions grow between her, her in-laws, and Shami. Rimla starts avoiding Arifa, leaving her angry and concerned about Rimla's behaviour. Meanwhile, preparations for Ayla's wedding continue, but Aoun remains deeply saddened. Ayla's wedding celebrations continue as tensions within the family increase. Rimla's reckless attempt to attend the ceremony results in her hospitalization and creates further conflict. When the groom's family fails to arrive on the wedding day, Rahat takes advantage of the situation and proposes that Aoun marry Ayla. Aoun and Ayla get married, leaving Rimla devastated. She later confronts Ayla for knowingly marrying the man she loves. Saqib gives Ayla a reality check and tells her that she should appreciate Aoun for marrying her. Meanwhile, Aoun makes it clear to Rimla that he is in love with Ayla. Rimla cleverly sends Shami to Ayla, hoping to bring them closer and repair their relationship. At the same time, she attempts to develop a closer connection with Aoun. Ayla makes it clear that she has no romantic feelings for Aoun and rejects him. After hearing Shami's account of the situation, Saqib becomes extremely angry with Ayla. Shami desperately attempts to meet Ayla, but the situation turns disastrous when Aoun catches them together. Following the incident, Saqib asks Aoun to take Ayla and leave the house. Ayla continues behaving rudely toward Aoun while they stay at his friend's house. Meanwhile, Rimla and Shami begin searching for Aoun and Ayla. Bi Jaan confronts Ayla about her behaviour and makes her realize Aoun's importance in her life. Meanwhile, Farooq makes a decision regarding Shami and Rimla's wedding. Aoun returns home late after experiencing a flat tyre, leaving Ayla worried about him. Meanwhile, Bi Jaan is hospitalized after overhearing a conversation between Shamsha and Zoya.

Shami once again stops Ayla and finally expresses his feelings, but she responds with anger. Meanwhile, Aoun stands up for Ayla in front of Farooq. Aoun gets burned when Ayla accidentally spills hot oil on him, bringing the two closer together. Elsewhere, Zoya shares news of a marriage proposal with Rafay. Ayla and Aoun gradually begin developing a closer bond as they deal with Aoun's condition. Meanwhile, Rimla overhears a conversation between Shami and his family. Just as Ayla and Aoun start growing closer, Rimla creates a misunderstanding that makes Ayla appear dishonest. As a result, Aoun feels betrayed by her. Following Rimla's visit and the misunderstanding it creates, Aoun throws Ayla out of the house. Their families become involved in the matter, but Ayla refuses to abandon her marriage. Aoun and Ayla begin rebuilding their relationship as Aoun opens up about his painful childhood and his parents' separation. Ayla remains beside him and supports him through his emotional struggles. Despite pressure from his family, Aoun refuses to accept his late father's inheritance. Meanwhile, Rimla's attempt to sell the factory leads to blackmail, while Ayla continues standing by Aoun. Aoun's secret meetings with Rimla create doubts in Ayla's mind as he tries to protect the family factory. Meanwhile, Aoun discovers the hidden relationship between Zoya and Rafay. Rimla sells the factory and files a domestic violence case, further escalating the family dispute. The arrests of Farooq and Ehtisham create additional tension and strain relationships within the family. Rimla betrays Shami's family, prompting Aoun to make efforts to repair the damage. However, her actions create further distance and misunderstandings between Aoun and Ayla. Ayla accuses Aoun of betraying her by becoming involved with Rimla. However, the truth reveals that Aoun sacrificed everything to save the family business. Despite his efforts, Ayla's continued mistrust pushes him toward seeking a divorce. Shami attempts to take his own life. Meanwhile, Aoun and Ayla finally resolve their misunderstandings, overcome their differences, and find happiness together.

== Cast ==
- Sachal Afzal as Aoun
- Zoha Tauqeer as Ayla
- Daniyal Khan as Ehtisham (Shami)
- Sarah Aijaz Khan as Rimla
- Samina Ahmed as Bi-Jaan
- Alyy Khan as Saqib Ahmed
- Laila Wasti as Arifa Begum
- Kaiser Khan Nizamani as Farooq Ahmed
- Angeline Malik as Rahat Begum
- Arjumand Rahim as Shamsa Begum
- Emaan Ahmed

== Broadcast ==
Zabt premiered on Geo Entertainment on 1 June 2026. It was broadcast daily and concluded on 17 July 2026.

== Reception ==
In a review published in Dawn in June 2026, Sadaf Haider discussed the series' portrayal of family relationships and described it as a melodrama focused on tensions within a joint family. The review also commented on its characterisation and performances.

Another review from Dawn observed that the serial's initial momentum had declined, while discussing its treatment of authoritarian parenting and family pressures.
