= Log Kia Kahengay =

2019 Pakistani television series

- Original title: ur
- Genre: Romantic drama; Serial drama; Soap
- Country of origin: Pakistan
- Original language: Urdu
- No. of seasons: 1
- No. of episodes: 115

Production
- Producer: Momina Duraid
- Production location: Pakistan
- Camera setup: Multi-camera setup
- Production company: MD Productions

Original release
- Network: Hum TV
- Release: 4 February – 5 July 2019

Log Kia Kahengay (Urdu: لوگ کیا کہیں گے, lit. 'What Will People Say?') is a 2019 Pakistani television soap opera which aired on Hum TV. It is produced by Momina Duraid under MD Productions, directed by Adeel Qamar Khan and written by Rizwana Princes. It has debutants Komal Meer, Ameer Gilani and Sabeena Farooq in leads.

== Plot ==
It explores the tale of two girls, Shiza (Komal Meer) and Mishal (Sabeena Farooq), who are childhood friends and share a sisterly bond. Due to their love for one another, Mishal asks her parents to arrange their marriages within the same family so they can live in the same house. Eventually, they become sisters-in-law when Shiza marries Harris, Mishal's older brother, with whom she has been in love since childhood. Mishal feels betrayed when they keep their relationship a secret, but she soon accepts the situation.

Later, she meets a handsome young man named Arsal, who initially takes a liking to Shiza but refrains from acting on it because of the girls’ sisterly bond, as his marriage has already been arranged to Mishal. He marries Mishal happily and cares for her.

However, things become more complicated for Shiza when her husband dies in a car accident. She is then forced to marry Mishal's husband and live her life as a co-wife. What will be the fate of the three of them?

== Cast ==
- Komal Meer as Shiza Javed, Mishal's best friend and Arsal's second wife
- Sabeena Farooq as Mishal Feroze, Shiza's best friend and Arsal's first wife
- Ameer Gilani as Arsal, Mishal and Shiza's husband
- Shamil Khan as Feroze, Mishal and Harris’ father
- Iram Rehman as Asma Feroze, Mishal and Harris’ mother
- Hassan Sheharyar Rahim as Rehan
- Sadia Hayat as Najma, Arsal's mother
- Zaib Khan as Azar, family friend of Shiza who likes her
- Sajjad Paul as Harris Feroze, Mishal's older brother and Shiza's ex-husband (Dead)
- Cameron Cruz
- Eram Nisar Bajwa
- Haleema BiBi
- Lubna Shehzadi
- Natasha Hussain as Raheela
- Tania Hussain as Nimra
