= Maseeha (TV series) =

- Genre: Drama
- Written by: Qaisra Hayat
- Directed by: Nain Maniar
- Starring: Ayesha Khan; Rubina Ashraf; Affan Waheed; Shahood Alvi; Badar Khalil; Mariya Khan; Anita Camphar
- Opening theme: "Maseeha" performed by Shabana
- Country of origin: Pakistan
- Original language: Urdu
- No. of episodes: 23

Production
- Producers: Shehzad Nasib; Samina Humayun Saeed

Original release
- Network: Hum TV
- Release: 8 May – 17 October 2012

Maseeha (Urdu: مسیحا, lit. 'Saviour') is a Pakistani drama serial directed by Nain Maniar, written by Qaisra Hayat and produced by Shahzad Nasib and Samina Humayun Saeed. It began airing from 8 May 2012 on Hum TV.

== Plot ==
Maseeha revolves around the sacrifices of a young girl who leaves her rich parents to marry her middle-class boyfriend. She does her level best to adjust to his family and takes care of his ill mother and two sisters when he goes abroad, but to no avail. Then a saviour enters her life, or does he?

== Cast ==
- Ayesha Khan as Abish
- Affan Waheed as Shaheryar
- Noman Masood as Basit Ali
- Sukaina Khan as Fiza
- Mariya Khan
- Ayesha Khan as Maira
- Badar Khalil
- Shahood Alvi
