= Ramsha Khan =

Pakistani actress (born 1994)

- رمشہ خان
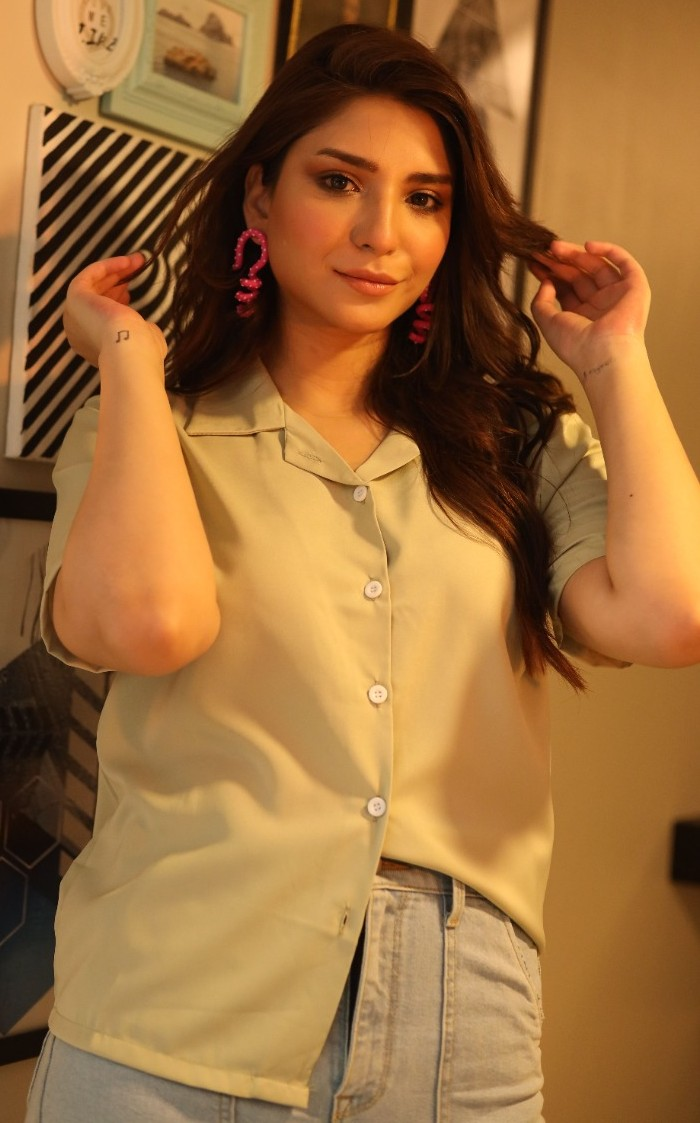
- Khan in 2021
- Born: 23 June 1994 (age 32); Karachi, Sindh, Pakistan
- Occupation: Actress
- Years active: 2017–present
- Spouse: Khushhal Khan (m. 2026)

Ramsha Khan (Urdu: رمشہ خان; born 23 June 1994) is a Pakistani actress who primarily works in Urdu television. Her accolades include a Hum Award and an ARY People's Choice Award. Khan made her acting debut with the 2017 film Thora Jee Le. She later received recognition for her dramas Mah-e-Tamaam (2018), Khudparast (2018–2019) and Kaisa Hai Naseeban (2019).

Khan had her career breakthrough with her portrayal of an independent girl in Ghisi Piti Mohabbat (2021), which won her the ARY People Choice Award for Favorite Actress. This was followed by her portrayal of an army officer in Sinf-e-Aahan (2021–22), a college girl in Hum Tum (2022) and a feudal lord's daughter in Duniyapur (2024–2025). For Hum Tum, she received the Lux Style Award for Best TV Actress nomination.

== Early life ==
Ramsha Khan was born on 23 June 1994 in Karachi, Sindh. Khan started her career as a model, before she ventured into acting.

== Career ==
=== Debut and early work (2017-2020) ===
Khan made her acting debut with the 2017 drama film Thora Jee Le, portraying an aspiring businesswoman. The film was a commercial failure. The same year, she played Hina in Woh Aik Pal opposite Feroze Khan and Marium Noor in Tumhari Marium opposite Junaid Khan. In 2017, Khan also appeared in two telefilms, Teen Shauqeen and Mohabbat Hogaye Aakhir, opposite Bilal Abbas Khan.

Khan played Shifa Taqi Lodhi opposite Wahaj Ali in Mah-e-Tamaam in 2018. From 2018 to 2019, she played Uswah opposite Shahzad Sheikh in Khudparast. Khan received praise for her portrayal in both of these series. She also appeared in two telefilms, Jeena Hai Mushkil and Weham, in the same year.

In 2019, Khan played Marium Ahmed, a woman facing marital abuse, opposite Muneeb Butt in Kaisa Hai Naseeban. Khan was praised for her portrayal and it was one of the highest rated serials in Pakistani television. From 2019 to 2020, she played Anoushay in Shahrukh Ki Saliyan opposite Ahsan Khan. In 2020, Khan played Hamna Azeem opposite Feroze Khan and Gohar Rasheed in Ishqiya, for which she received an ARY People's Choice Awards for Favorite Actress in a role of Wife nomination.

=== Career progression (2021-present) ===
Khan's career marked a turning point in 2021, with her portrayal of an independent girl Samiya in Ghisi Piti Mohabbat, opposite Wahaj Ali, Shahood Alvi and Ali Abbas. A reviewer of Daily Times was appreciative of Khan's impeccable comic timing, dialogue delivery, and facial expressions. For her performance, she earned the ARY People's Choice Award for Favorite Actress. The same year, she played Bakht in drama Shehnai opposite Affan Waheed. From 2021 to 2022, Khan played an army officer Pariwesh Jamal in the women centric Sinf-e-Aahan. During filming, the lead cast also received military training.

Khan played a college chemistry student Neha Qutub ud Din opposite Ahad Raza Mir in the Ramadan special Hum Tum, in 2022. The series and her portrayal was praised across Pakistan and India. She received the Lux Style Award for Best TV Actress nomination for her performance.

In 2023, Khan appeared in the anthology film, Teri Meri Kahaniyaan opposite Sheheryar Munawar. The film received positive reviews. The News International praised Khan's "screen presence". The same year, she portrayed Tabassum Mughal, opposite Talha Chahour in Jannat Se Aagay for which she received nomination for Best TV actress at Lux Style Awards. Nudrat Nazir from The Nation found that she "performed Tabassum’s innocent and heroic worship in the best possible way." Khan started 2024 portraying Ana Dilawez in the drama Duniyapur. In the same year, she portrayed a doctor Tabeer Aslam opposite Ahmed Ali Akbar in the mini series Nadaan. Following this, she briefly appeared in the romantic comedy film Love Guru starring Mahira Khan and Humayun Saeed.

== Other work and public image ==
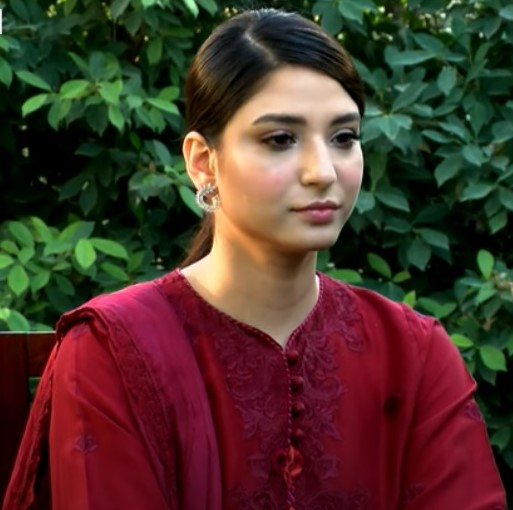
Khan at an event in 2020

Khan has been described in the media, among Pakistan's most popular actresses. Images Dawn named Khan in their "Standout Performances: Female" list of 2019 and 2021. In 2022, Khan was placed in "Best Pakistani Actresses" list, for her performance in Hum Tum.

She also serves as a brand ambassador for a number of brands such as Nestlé, TUC, 7Up, Pond's and Hum Mart. Khan modelled in Hum Bridal Couture Week in 2021, for designer Abeera Usman's collection "Mirha". In 2020 and 2022, Khan was placed in Hello Pakistan's HOT100 list, in the "Trailblazers" category.

In addition to the dramas, Khan has appeared as a guest in various series and talk shows. In 2017, she appeared on Jago Pakistan Jago and Kitni Girhain Baaki Hain: Part 2, opposite Tipu Sharif. In 2018, she played Kiran Khan in an episode of Ustani Jee. Khan also appeared on the second season of Jeeto Pakistan League, in 2021.

== Personal life ==
Khan married actor Khushhal Khan in a private ceremony in April 2026.

== Filmography ==
=== Films ===
| Year | Title | Role | Notes | Ref. |
|---|---|---|---|---|
| 2017 | Thora Jee Le | Misha | | |
| 2023 | Teri Meri Kahaniyaan | Rumaisa | Segment: "Pasoori" | |
| 2025 | Love Guru | Kiran Qureshi | | |

=== Television ===
| Year | Title | Role | Network | Notes | Ref. |
|---|---|---|---|---|---|
| 2017 | Woh Aik Pal | Hina | Hum TV | | |
| 2017 | Tumhari Marium | Marium Noor | Hum TV | | |
| 2018 | Mah-e-Tamaam | Shifa Taqi Lodhi | Hum TV | | |
| 2018–2019 | Khudparast | Uswah | ARY Digital | | |
| 2019 | Kaisa Hai Naseeban | Marium Ahmed | ARY Digital | | |
| 2019–2020 | Shahrukh Ki Saliyan | Anoushay | Geo Entertainment | | |
| 2020 | Ishqiya | Hamna Siddique Azeem | ARY Digital | | |
| 2020–2021 | Ghisi Piti Mohabbat | Samiya Anwar | ARY Digital | | |
| 2021 | Shehnai | Bakht | ARY Digital | | |
| 2021–2022 | Sinf-e-Aahan | Pariwesh Jamal | ARY Digital | | |
| 2022 | Hum Tum | Neha Qutub Ud Din | Hum TV | Ramadan special | |
| 2023 | Jannat Se Aagay | Tabassum Mughal | Geo Entertainment | | |
| 2024–2025 | Duniyapur | Ana Dilawez Nawab | Green Entertainment | | |
| 2024 | Nadaan | Dr. Tabeer Aslam | Hum TV | Mini series | |
| 2025 | Biryani | Nisa Majeed Ansari | ARY Digital | | |

=== Telefilms ===
| Year | Title | Role | Ref. |
|---|---|---|---|
| 2017 | Teen Shauqeen | Neelofar | |
| 2017 | Mohabbat Hogaye Aakhir | Faiza | |
| 2018 | Jeena Hai Mushkil | Zoya | |
| 2018 | Weham | | |

=== Other appearances ===
| Year | Title | Role | Notes | Ref. |
|---|---|---|---|---|
| 2017 | Jago Pakistan Jago | Herself | To promote Woh Aik Pal | |
| 2017 | Kitni Girhain Baaki Hain 2 | Masooma | Episode 35: "Saraab" | |
| 2018 | Ustani Jee | Kiran Khan | Episode 8 | |
| 2021 | Jeeto Pakistan League 2 | Herself | Episode 23 | |
| 2024 | 9th Hum Awards | Host | | |

== Accolades ==
| Year | Award | Category | Work | Result | Ref. |
|---|---|---|---|---|---|
| 2021 | ARY People's Choice Awards | Favorite Actress in a role of Wife | Ishqiya | Nominated | |
| 2021 | ARY People's Choice Awards | Favourite Actress | Ghisi Piti Mohabbat | Won | |
| 2021 | ARY People's Choice Awards | Favourite Jodi (with Wahaj Ali) | Ghisi Piti Mohabbat | Nominated | |
| 2021 | Pakistan International Screen Awards | Best Television Actress Jury | Ghisi Piti Mohabbat | Nominated | |
| 2023 | 22nd Lux Style Awards | Best TV Actress | Hum Tum | Nominated | |
| 2024 | 9th Hum Awards | Best Actress Popular | Hum Tum | Nominated | |
| 2024 | 9th Hum Awards | Best Onscreen Couple Popular (with Ahad Raza Mir) | Hum Tum | Won | |
| 2025 | 23rd Lux Style Awards | Best Film Actress | Teri Meri Kahaniyaan | Nominated | |
| 2025 | 23rd Lux Style Awards | Best TV Actress – Critics' Choice | Jannat Se Aagay | Nominated | |
