= Kaisa Hai Naseeban =

Pakistani drama television series

- Left to right: Muneeb Butt, Ramsha Khan, Uzma Gillani
- Also known as: Mangharat
- Genre: Family drama Social drama
- Written by: Sameena Aijaz
- Directed by: Ahmed Bhatti
- Starring: Ramsha Khan; Muneeb Butt; Uzma Gillani
- Opening theme: "Kaisa Hai Naseeba" sung by Zeb Bangash
- Country of origin: Pakistan
- Original language: Urdu
- No. of episodes: 26 (13 double episodes)

Production
- Producer: Abdullah Seja
- Production locations: Karachi, Pakistan; Kuala Lumpur, Malaysia
- Camera setup: Multi-camera setup
- Production company: Idream Entertainment

Original release
- Network: ARY Digital
- Release: 9 January – 3 April 2019

Related
- Haiwan; Do Bol

Kaisa Hai Naseeban (Urdu: کیسا ہے نصیباں; previously titled Mangharat, Urdu: من گَھڑَت) is a 2019 Pakistani television series, produced by Abdullah Seja under their banner Idreams Entertainment. The drama aired weekly on ARY Digital. It stars Muneeb Butt and Ramsha Khan. It focuses on marital abuse in Pakistani society and the custom of dowry. The serial was one of the highest rated serials in the history of Pakistani television with a rating of 20.87.

== Plot ==
Kaisa Hai Naseeban Shows the stoy of a young girl named Marium Jamal, who is married to her paternal cousin named Ahmed who lives with his sister and mother in Malaysia. Ahmed is a abusive, useless and lazy man who forces Marium to earn for his family in Malaysia. Marium is often beaten up by Ahmed which is witnessed by her cruel mother-in-law and sister but still remains silent often manupilating Ahmed.

== Cast ==
- Ramsha Khan as Marium Ahmed
- Muneeb Butt as Ahmed
- Uzma Gillani as Musarrat; Ahmed's mother, Paternal aunt of Marium
- Waseem Abbas as Jamal; Marium's father
- Nida Mumtaz as Shahana Jamal; Marium's mother
- Shehzeen Rahat as Sana Waheed; Ahmed's sister
- Farah Shah as Sofia; Maternal aunt of Marium
- Agha Mustafa Hassan as Affan
- Anwaar Beg Moghal as Noor-ud-deen
- Farhan Ahmed Malhi as Waheed
- Preet as Azlain
- Waris Khan as restaurant Manager

== Production ==
The series was earlier titled Mangharat but the makers changed it to Kaisa Hai Naseeban.

== Reception ==
Ramsha Khan's performance was highlighted in a review by The Nation.

== Awards and nominations ==
- Zeb Bangash was nominated for Best Original Soundtrack at Lux Style Awards 2020
