= Wahaj Ali =

Pakistani actor (born 1988)

- وہاج علی
- Born: 1 December 1988 (age 37); Lahore, Punjab, Pakistan
- Education: National College of Arts
- Occupation: Actor
- Years active: 2015–present
- Known for: Tere Bin (2022); Mujhe Pyaar Hua Tha (2022)
- Spouse: Sana Farooq (m. 2016)
- Children: 1

Wahaj Ali (Urdu: وہاج علی; born 1 December 1988) is a Pakistani actor known for his work predominantly in Urdu television. He is a recipient of several accolades including two Lux Style Awards, alongside two Hum Awards nominations.

He made his acting debut with Hum TV's soap drama Ishq Ibadat (2015) and subsequently appeared in Gila (2016). He then started in Mah-e-Tamaam (2018) and the ISPR-based Ehd-e-Wafa (2019). Ali gained praise for his portrayal as an obsessive lover in the drama Fitoor and as a Bengali fighter based on Shafi Imam Rumi in the historical drama Jo Bichar Gaye both (2021). The romance drama Tere Bin (2022) marked a turning point in his career and he gained further success with Mujhe Pyaar Hua Tha (2023). The former earned him the Lux Style Award for Best TV Actor. This success was followed by two poorly-received dramas.

== Early life and family ==
Ali was born on 1 December 1988 into a Punjabi family in Lahore, Punjab. His father was a government employee and his mother was a teacher. He is the only child of his parents. Ali earned his Master's in Multimedia Arts from the National College of Arts.

== Career ==
=== Early work in theater and TV production ===
Ali began his career as a theater actor in 2007 before joining a TV channel in the news and programming department. From 2009 to 2011, he worked as an assistant producer at Samaa TV. After 2011, Ali was producer at Geo TV.

=== TV debut and success (2015–present) ===
Marking his television debut as a leading actor in 2015 with the drama Ishq Ibadat, he went on to play lead in several notable television serials, including Hari Hari Churiyan (2017), Dil Nawaz (2017), Mah-e-Tamaam (2017), Dil-e-Bereham (2019), Bharam (2019) Fitoor (2021) and Ishq Jalebi (2021).

In 2021, Ali delivered a critically lauded performance as Shafi Imam Rumi, a Bangladeshi freedom fighter, in the historical drama Jo Bichar Gaye, showcasing his range and dramatic intensity. His portrayal was described as "powerful and emotional" by reviewers, particularly in the show's climactic scenes.

He reached widespread popularity across South Asia with his portrayal of Murtasim Khan in the 2022–23 romance drama Tere Bin, which became a cultural phenomenon. According to a Gulf News op-ed written in June 2025, years after the end of the drama, Ali’s "magnetic presence" and "emotional chemistry" with co-star Yumna Zaidi were key to the show's success.

== Media image ==
Ali has established himself as one of the leading Urdu television actors. Dawn noted, "The fact that all his different avatars have been so well-received is testament to his talent." Something Haute noted, "Wahaj Ali's choices and the credibility they have amassed, have played a pivotal role in positioning him right at the top of the artistic food chain." He has been placed in Hello Pakistan's HOT100 list, in the "Trailblazers" category. Ali received the "Sexiest Heartthrob" title at Hello Magazine Awards in 2023. He serves as an ambassador for a number of brands such as Head & Shoulders and 7 Up.

== Filmography ==
Key
†	Denotes films that have not yet been released

=== Films ===
Year	Title	Role	Notes	Ref
2019	Superstar	Young Salim Malik	Cameo appearance	
2019	Dhoodh Patti	Salar	Short film	
2021	Yorker	Ammar Saleem	Short film	
2022	Team Muhafiz	Reza	Voice role	
2023	Teri Meri Kahaniyaan	Asad Sami	Segment: “Aik So Taeeswaan”	

=== Television ===
Year	Title	Role	Channel	Ref.
2015	Ishq Ibadat	Sahil	Hum TV	
2016	Mera Dard Na Janay Koi	Bilal	Hum TV	
2016	Wafa	Hashir	Geo Entertainment	
2016	Gila	Sanwal / Ramis	Hum TV	
2016	Ahsas	Zohaib Adil	Urdu1	
2017	Zoya Sawleha	Faris	Geo Entertainment	
2017	Mere Dil Mere Musafir	Hasan	TV One	
2017	Hari Hari Churiyan	Ali	Geo Entertainment	
2017	Dil Nawaz	Dr Fawad Khalid	A-Plus TV	
2018	Haiwan	Maan	ARY Digital	
2018	Mah-e-Tamaam	Taqi Lodhi	Hum TV	
2019	Dil-e-Bereham	Tabish	A-Plus TV	
2019	Bharam	Maarif Ali	Hum TV	
2019	Ehd-e-Wafa	Shariq Habib	Hum TV	
2019	Haqeeqat	Asif	A-Plus TV	
2020	Mera Maan Rakhna	Mohid	TV One	
2020	Bikhray Moti	Ahad	ARY Digital	
2020	Ghisi Piti Mohabbat	Rizwan Naheed	ARY Digital	
2021	Fitoor	Hamza Sadiq	Geo Entertainment	
2021	Dil Na Umeed Toh Nahi	Jamshed "Jimmy"	TV One	
2021	Ishq Jalebi	Basim Hussain	Geo Entertainment	
2021	Jo Bichar Gaye	Shafi Imam Rumi	Geo Entertainment	
2022	Mujhe Pyaar Hua Tha	Saad Hussain	ARY Digital	
2022	Tere Bin	Murtasim Shahnawaz Khan	Geo Entertainment	
2023	Jurm	Daniyal Mujib	Geo Entertainment	
2023	22 Qadam	Junaid Malik	Green Entertainment	
2023	Mein	Zaid Asif	ARY Digital	
2024	Sunn Mere Dil	Bilal Abdullah	Geo Entertainment	
2025	Jinn Ki Shadi Unki Shadi	Ali Chaudhary	Hum TV	
2026	Mitti De Baway	Iqbal Channan aka Baala	Green Entertainment	

=== Web series ===
Year	Title	Role	Platform	Ref
2026	The Pink Shirt	Umer	Zee5; Begin Watch	

=== Telefilms ===
Year	Title	Role	Network
2016	Bitiya Hamaray Zamanay Mein	Fahad	Geo Entertainment
2016	Shor	Shahid	TV One
2020	Love Siyappa	Shahabuddin aka Shobi	Geo Entertainment

=== Music videos ===
Year	Title	Singer	Ref
2023	Jaani Door Gaye	Hadiqa Kiani	

== Awards and nominations ==
Year	Award	Category	Work	Result	Ref
2016	4th Hum Awards	Best Soap Actor	Ishq Ibadat	Nominated	
2019	ARY Social Media Awards	Best Newcomer Male	Haiwan	Won	
2021	ARY People's Choice Awards	Favourite Jodi (with Ramsha Khan)	Ghisi Piti Mohabbat	Nominated	
2024	Hum Style Awards	Most Stylish Television Actor - Male	Himself	Nominated	
2025	23rd Lux Style Awards	Best TV Actor Male - Viewer’s Choice	Tere Bin	Won	
2025	23rd Lux Style Awards	Best TV Actor Male - Critics’ Choice	Tere Bin	Nominated	
2025	23rd Lux Style Awards	Film Actor of the Year - Male	Teri Meri Kahaniyaan	Won	
