= Duniyapur (TV series) =

2024 Pakistani television series

- دنیا پور
- Genre: Drama; Romance; Action
- Written by: Radain Shah
- Directed by: Shahid Shafaat
- Starring: Ramsha Khan; Khushhal Khan; Nauman Ijaz; Sami Khan; Manzar Sehbai; (See entire cast)
- Theme music composer: Shuja Haider
- Opening theme: Jhooti Ana Kay Dawaydar by Asrar and Shuja Haider
- Composer: Shuja Haider
- Country of origin: Pakistan
- Original language: Urdu
- No. of seasons: 1
- No. of episodes: 24

Production
- Producers: Multiverse Entertainment; Green Entertainment
- Production locations: Gujranwala, Islamabad, Siran Valley, Khyber Pakhtunkhwa and Azad Kashmir
- Editor: Rao Ali
- Camera setup: Multi-camera setup
- Running time: 36 minutes
- Production company: Multiverse Entertainment

Original release
- Network: Green Entertainment
- Release: 25 September 2024 – 5 March 2025

Duniyapur is a 2024 Urdu-language Pakistani television drama series directed by Shahid Shafaat and written by Radain Shah. The series is produced under Multiverse Entertainment and premiered on 25 September 2024 on Green Entertainment. It stars an ensemble cast of Nauman Ijaz, Khushhal Khan, Ramsha Khan, Sami Khan and Manzar Sehbai. Duniyapur is the most expensive drama made in the history of Pakistani television.

The series follows the fierce rivalry between the Adam and Nawab families in the town of Duniyapur. After losing their elder brothers, Shahmeer and Ana, united by grief and love, work to end the feud and restore peace to the town.

== Plot ==
In the troubled town of Duniyapur, a rivalry between the Adam and Nawab families reaches its peak when the oldest sons from each side are killed in a fight. This loss pushes Shahmeer Adam, who had always wanted to escape his family’s legacy, and Ana Nawab, who steps into a leadership role after her brother’s death, to face their families' hatred.

As they deal with their sadness and new responsibilities, Shahmeer and Ana fall in love. Together, they work to end the long-standing feud, and, with help from the local police, succeed in bringing peace and harmony back to Duniyapur.

== Cast ==
=== Main ===
- Nauman Ijaz as Nauroz Adam: Nawabzadi's elder son; Aurangzeb's brother; Bakhtawar's husband; Nayab, Shahmir and Nimra's father.
- Khushhal Khan as Shahmir Adam: Nauroz and Bakhtawar's younger son; Nayab and Nimra's brother; Ana's husband.
- Ramsha Khan as Ana Nawab: Nawab Dilawaiz's daughter; Farhad's sister; Shahmir's wife.
- Sami Khan as Mir Hassan: SHO of DuniyaPur; Aiman's husband.
- Manzar Sehbai as Nawab Dilawaiz: Noshaba and Nimra's husband; Farhad and Ana's father.

=== Recurring ===
- Zaib Rehman as Nawabzadi: Nauroz and Aurangzeb's mother.
- Saima Qureshi as Bakhtawar Nauroz : Nauroz's wife; Nayab, Shahmir and Nimra's mother.
- Yousuf Bashir Qureshi as Aurangzeb Adam: Nawabzadi's younger son; Nauroz's brother; Madiha's father.
- Huma Syed as Nimra Adam: Nauroz and Bakhtawar's daughter; Nayab and Shahmir's sister; Nawab Dilawaiz's third wife.
- Shamil Khan as Zamir: Dilawaiz's confidant.
- Erum Akhter as Noshaba Dilawaiz: Dilawaiz's second wife.
- Amra Zahid Kazi as Madiha Adam: Aurangzeb Adam's daughter; Nayab, Shahmir and Nimra's cousin.
- Ali Raza as Nayab Adam: Nauroz and Bakhtawar's elder son; Shahmir and Nimra's brother; Nagina's husband.
- Hassan Niazi as Farhad Nawab: Nawab Dilawaiz's eldest son; Ana's brother.
- Nayyar Ejaz as Zabardast Qasai: Nauroz's confidant; Shabash & Behtareen's father.
- Hussain Ali Shah as Shabash Qasai: Zabardast's son; Behtareen's brother; Shahmir's confidant
- Mashal Khan as Aiman Hassan: Mir Hassan's wife.
- Mashal Karim as Nagina Nayab : Nayab's wife.
- Najam us Saqib as Furqan Shamsher : Shamsher's son; Nimra's lover.
- Sarfaraz
- Saad Ali
- Jhalak
- Hammad Siddiqui

== Production ==
=== Development and casting ===
The series was announced in 2023 and development began in January 2024. In mid-2023, it was reported that Ramsha Khan and Khushhal Khan would star in an upcoming project which would be directed by Shahid Shafaat and written by Radain Shah. Nauman Ijaz and Sami Khan later joined the cast. The show had a six-month pre-production period followed by nine months of shooting according to Shahid.

In interviews, the cast emphasized that DuniyaPur is entirely original, calling comparisons to international series such as Game of Thrones unfounded.

The series is the most expensive project in the history of Pakistani television according to the lead cast and director. The estimated budget of the series is ₹25–30 crore (₹250–300 million).

The first teaser for the series was released on 2 September 2024 by Green Entertainment. The first episode was broadcast on 25 September 2024 on the same network.

=== Filming ===
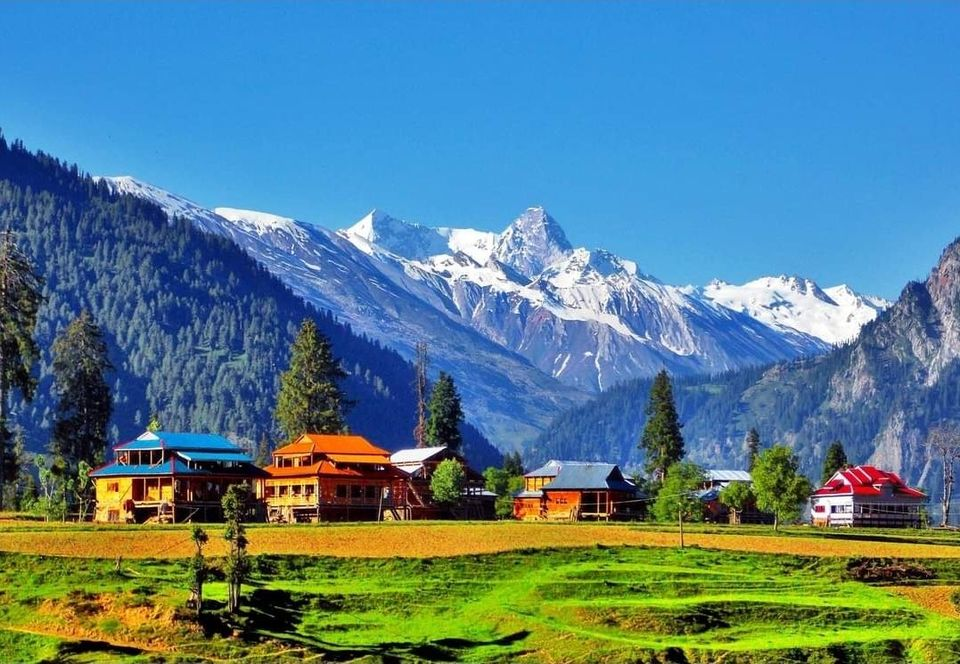
Azad Kashmir, one of the major filming location

Principal photography for the series commenced in mid-2023 as the series was announced. The multiple-camera setup was used. Filming for the series took place in Gujranwala, Sargodha, Islamabad, Wazirabad, Siran Valley, Khyber Pakhtunkhwa, Azad Kashmir and other places in Pakistan. Minor filming also took place at Rohtas Fort, Jhelum.

== Soundtrack ==
The original soundtrack for the series is performed by Asrar, Shuja Haider and Rapthor with the lyrics and music composition from Shuja Haider.

== Release ==
The trailer for the series released on 16 September 2024. The series broadcast on 25 September 2024 in Pakistan. It airs every Wednesday on Green Entertainment in Prime time (8pm).

== Reception ==
=== Critical reception ===
Talha Bin Hamid of the Dawn noted, "the story’s grandeur and scope are perfectly captured by its fast pace, diverse and rich cast, and expert action photography."
