= Aangan Mein Deewar =

Pakistani television series

- آنگن میں دیوار
- Written by: Atta Ullah Aali
- Directed by: Shahid Aziz
- Starring: Arjumand Rahim; Firdous Jamal; Shamil Khan; Farhana Maqsood
- Country of origin: Pakistan
- Original language: Urdu
- No. of episodes: 100

Production
- Producer: Amir Rao
- Camera setup: Multi-camera
- Production company: IPN

Original release
- Network: PTV Home
- Release: 10 October 2015 – 25 July 2016

Aangan Mein Deewar is a Pakistani television series directed by Shahid Aziz, which was first aired on PTV Home from 10 October 2015 to 25 July 2016. Set in Lahore, the series stars Arjumand Rahim as a young widow who enters politics, inheriting her late husband's political legacy.

== Plot ==
After the death of her husband, Chaudhry Noor Alam, who was a well-known name of Lahore's politics, Mashal inherits his political legacy. She takes over the management of his haveli and tries to contest elections. Meanwhile, Chaudhry's first wife with her elder sister and daughter returns from abroad. She tries to grab the property by claiming that her daughter is the sole heir of Chaudhry. As she starts scheming to evict Mashal from the inheritance, the latter responds through a legal course of action. Mashal gets the help of her lawyer Imran in this scenario but things get complicated for her when the lawyer is committed by Sara, the daughter of Chaudhry's political rival.

== Cast ==
- Arjumand Rahim as Mashal Chaudhry
- Firdous Jamal as Chaudhry Noor Aalam
- Munir Nadir as Mehmood Aalam
- Nasreen Qureshi as Bua
- Munazzah Arif as Laila
- Saima Saleem as Naaz
- Zahid Qureshi as Malik Liaquat
- Farhana Maqsood as Sara
- Fajar Ali as Farwa
- Shamil Khan as Imran
- Raheela Agha as Khadija
- Sehrish Khan as Mashal's aunt
- Naveed Siddiqui as Police officer
