= Muhabbat Gumshuda Meri =

2023 Pakistani television series

- Genre: Drama; Romance
- Written by: Rahat Jabeen
- Directed by: Shahid Shafaat
- Starring: Khushhal Khan; Dananeer Mobeen
- Theme music composer: Sibte Hassan
- Opening theme: Tu Ibtida
- Country of origin: Pakistan
- Original language: Urdu
- No. of seasons: 1
- No. of episodes: 26

Production
- Producer: Momina Duraid
- Production company: MD Productions

Original release
- Network: Hum TV
- Release: 28 April – 27 October 2023

Muhabbat Gumshuda Meri (transl. My Lost Love) is a 2023 Pakistani romantic drama television series produced by Momina Duraid for MD Productions. It stars Khushhal Khan and Dananeer Mobeen. It is directed by Shahid Shafaat who won the Best Director award at the 9th Hum Awards for the series.

== Plot ==
Zubia and Saim have grown up together and have a deep bond. As they enter adulthood, they realize their feelings for each other, but their families do not approve. Saim's family proposes marriage to Zubia's family, but they refuse. Zubia promises Saim that she will convince her family to accept their relationship but fails.

Eventually, they elope and get married. Zobia and Saim fight while eloping and separate. Years later, Zobia becomes a doctor and Saim works as a singer. He realises he still loves her when he comes across her after a long time and tries to convince her that they should be together. Saim's grandfather helps both families to accept their union and they get married in a lavish ceremony.

== Cast ==
- Khushhal Khan as Saim Ibrahim: Ibrahim & Faiqa's son; Zobia's childhood bestfriend turned husband.
- Dananeer Mobeen as Dr. Zobia: Sarmad & Samina's younger daughter; Rushna's younger sister; Saim's childhood friend and later wife.
- Noreen Gulwani as Rushna: Sarmad & Samina's older daughter; Zobia's older sister; Daniyal's cousin and later wife; Noor's mother.
- Ali Raza as Daniyal: Sajida's son; Rushna's cousin turned husband; Noor's father; Zobia's cousin.
- Omair Rana as Mohammad Ibrahim: Faiqa's husband; Saim's father.
- Ayesha Toor as Faiqa: Ibrahim's wife; Saim's mother.
- Ali Tahir as Sarmad Ahmad: Samina's husband; Zobia & Rushna's father.
- Farah Sadia as Samina Sarmad: Sarmad's wife; Zobia & Rushna's mother.
- Agha Ali as Daniyal's father; Sajida's husband; Sarmad's older brother; Zobia & Rushna's uncle.
- Laila Zuberi as Sajida: Daniyal's mother; Zobia & Rushna's aunt.
- Saima Kanwal as Nasreen: Emaad's mother; Zobia, Rushna & Daniyal's aunt.
- Madiha Rizvi as Sitara: Seemab's mother; Samina's younger sister; Zobia & Rushna's maternal aunt.
- Mohja Khan as Seemab aka Simi: Sitara's daughter; Zobia & Rushna's cousin.
- Munawar Saeed as Mehmood: Faiqa's father; Saim's maternal grandfather.
- Hafiz Najam Us Saqib as Shaheer: Saim's former friend.
- Saqib Sameer as Haji Nazar.

== Reception ==
Hurmat Majid of Youlin Magazine praised the series and the performances, including that of Laila Zuberi and newcomers while a critic for Pakistani Cinema lamented the series's lack of script and poor start.

== Awards and nominations ==
| Year | Ceremony | Category | Recipient | Result | Ref(s). |
|---|---|---|---|---|---|
| 28 September 2024 | Hum Awards | Best Drama Serial | Momina Duraid Productions | Nominated | |
| 28 September 2024 | Hum Awards | Best Director Drama Serial | Shahid Shafaat | Won | |
| 28 September 2024 | Hum Awards | Best Writer Drama Serial | Rahat Jabeen | Nominated | |
| 28 September 2024 | Hum Awards | Best Actor | Khushhal Khan | Won | |
| 28 September 2024 | Hum Awards | Best Actress | Dananeer Mobeen | Nominated | |
