= Mah-e-Tamaam =

2018 Pakistani television series by Momina Duraid

- ماہ تمام
- Genre: Romantic drama; Serial drama
- Written by: Amna Riaz
- Directed by: Syed Ahmed Kamran
- Starring: Naveen Waqar; Emmad Irfani; Ramsha Khan; Wahaj Ali
- Opening theme: "Mah-e-Tamaam" by Alycia Dias
- Country of origin: Pakistan
- Original language: Urdu
- No. of seasons: 1
- No. of episodes: 28

Production
- Producer: Momina Duraid
- Production location: Pakistan
- Camera setup: Multi-camera setup
- Production company: MD Productions

Original release
- Network: Hum TV
- Release: 29 January – 13 August 2018

Mah-e-Tamaam (Urdu: ماہ تمام, lit. 'The Full Moon') is a 2018 Pakistani drama produced by Momina Duraid under the banner MD Productions. It is directed by Syed Ahmed Kamran and written by Amna Riaz, based on an eponymous novel by her. The series starred Naveen Waqar, Emmad Irfani, Ramsha Khan and Wahaj Ali in lead roles.

Mah-e-Tamaam received praise for Khan and Ali's pairing and performance. It aired on Hum Pashto 1 in Pashto language under the same title.

== Cast ==
- Wahaj Ali as Taqi Lodhi
- Ramsha Khan as Shifa Taqi Lodhi
- Naveen Waqar as Samahir
- Emmad Irfani as Umair
- Hafsa Butt as Samar
- Yasir Alam as Sameer
- Laila Zuberi as Salima
- Asad Siddiqui as Rohel
- Afraz Rasool
- Fahima Awan as Sabi
- Manzoor Qureshi as Abdul Baqir Lodhi
- Parveen Akbar as Tai jan
- Seemi Pasha as Aliya
- Nawal Saeed as Ramla
- Tabbasum Arif as Sarwat (Samar's mother)
- Kainat Chohan
- Zia Gurchani
- Natalia Awais as Mehak

== See also ==
- List of programs broadcast by Hum TV
