= Tere Bin (2022 TV series) =

2022 Pakistani TV series by Siraj-ul-Haque

- Genre: Drama; Romance; Action
- Written by: Nooran Makhdoom
- Directed by: Siraj-ul-Haque
- Starring: Wahaj Ali; Yumna Zaidi
- Theme music composer: Shani Arshad
- Opening theme: Kya Hoti Hai Bewafai
- Country of origin: Pakistan
- Original language: Urdu
- No. of seasons: 1
- No. of episodes: 58

Production
- Producers: Abdullah Kadwani; Asad Qureshi
- Production company: 7th Sky Entertainment

Original release
- Network: Geo TV
- Release: 28 December 2022 – 6 July 2023

Tere Bin (transl. Without You) is a romantic Pakistani drama television series produced by Abdullah Kadwani and Asad Qureshi under the banner 7th Sky Entertainment. Directed by Siraj-ul-Haque, it aired from 28 December 2022 to 6 July 2023 on Geo TV, consisting of 58 episodes. Starring Wahaj Ali and Yumna Zaidi in main roles, it gained popularity due to the lead couple's chemistry and its background score.

In July 2023, after the last episode aired, Kadwani confirmed on his Instagram handle that there will be a second season. In December 2023, the series was officially renewed for a second season. The producers confirmed Yumna Zaidi and Wahaj Ali's return in Tere Bin Season 2 in 2025. At the 23rd Lux Style Awards, Tere Bin won four awards in the Viewers' Choice categories: Best TV Play, Best Original Soundtrack, Best TV Actor (Wahaj Ali), and Best TV Actress (Yumna Zaidi).

== Plot ==
The head of a village in Sindh as well as a feudal lord, Murtasim Shahnawaz Khan (Wahaj Ali) is a handsome, charismatic and dominating young man, who is on a stroll in the fields to discern the progress of the crops when one of the farmers mournfully informs him of the threats they are agonised with and enlightens him of the rising menace to their fields imposed by a cutthroat rival in the village named, Malik Mukhtar and his vile son, Malik Zubair. Being the village's premier, Murtasim heeds the whole situation and it quite incenses him. He's known to be responsible as well as ruthless when it comes to protecting and ensuring his people's safety. When Malik tries to create problems over land that he desires which is owned by Murtasim, it's the cue for Murtasim to assert his true dominance. Hence, to instill terror and warn his foes of further barbarity against his people and meddling in the village's peace, Murtasim barges into Malik's mansion and threatens to kill his son —thus fueling the rivalry further.

On the other hand, Meerab Waqas Ahmad (Yumna Zaidi), is her father's princess who is a renowned lawyer in Karachi. She's an ambitious and beautiful young girl who wants to pursue higher studies and aspires to become a lawyer like her father, Waqas. Her entire world revolves around her parents and she believes in them the most. Her strong and confident personality makes her stand against social injustices around her, and she never holds back in voicing her views on society's injustice to the powerless.

In Hyderabad, Murtasim's mother, Salma Begum, is considered the “Khaanum” and is respected among the whole village. Being extremely venerated with her regal aura that graces the grand mansion of the Khans, she's customed to heed the problems and sufferings of the people calmly and unriddle suitable solutions for their miseries. It is also shown that Murtasim has a younger cousin, Haya, Murtasim's late paternal aunt's daughter, who is deeply in love with him to the extent of an unhealthy obsession as she earnestly dreams to marry him. She roams like a delusional lover in his room and touches his walled pictures, claiming that she's the one who would own him in the end no matter how much he runs away from her and dismisses her advances. It turns out that Murtasim's half-aware of the madly fascinated upswings of Haya regarding him, but he deems her as his younger sister and continues to refuse her in every way.

Waqas's good friend and Murtasim's paternal Uncle, Anwar Khan, is clued in on Meerab's wish to study law and he promptly informs his sister-in-law Salma Begum of Waqas's inclination to let Meerab fulfill her ambition. Salma Begum is a woman of a conservative and backward mentality. She does not deem that the women of her family should be tolerated to roam in circles of courts but rather be reserved in a womanly chore to which she's entitled. She urges Anwar to travel to Karachi along with Murtasim to make Waqas understand and reiterate that she's the one who makes decisions in their family, after her son and the crowned kingpin, Murtasim Shahnawaz Khan himself.

It's Meerab's birthday coming soon and her college friends, Saba and Rohail, insist on having a party. Intending to romantically propose to Meerab on her birthday itself, Rohail volunteers to throw the party and after many avowals by her friends, Meerab agrees, unaware of what Rohail has planned. On the way to Karachi with Anwar, Murtasim stops his car among the throng of spectators surrounding the public street and goes over to investigate the chaos only to see Meerab manhandling a man who she claims to be abusive with his wife, and her female servant. Angered that Meerab is supposedly flouting their family's vanity, he roughly drags her away from the scene.

Meerab tries hard to make sure her father does not view her as culpable and laments over how Murtasim and Anwar dragged her insensitively. She questions their constant involvement in their house and asserts that they don't hold any power over her. Waqas makes her leave without listening to her which upsets Meerab. Anwar warns Waqas that he wouldn't condone their family's dignity being bedraggled on the streets.

To resolve the outcome of Meerab's situation, Murtasim relays a suitable suggestion to deal with Meerab, which is to have her marry as soon as possible. Waqas instruct Meerab that she must go to Salma Begum's mansion and apologize to Anwar for what he considers a 'mistake.' For her parents' sake, Meerab travels to Hyderabad and irritates the family with her outspoken and upright tone. Salma Begum passes the knowledge of the decision she's made for Meerab's marriage to Waqas and Anila, urging them to reluctantly agree while not bothering to notify Meerab about the decision yet.

At Meerab's birthday party (organized by Rohail), a disgruntled Murtasim arrives uninvited and creates a scene with Rohail, who refuses to let Meerab be dragged away against her wishes. On the occasion of Meerab's birthday, Salma Begum announces the marriage alliance between her son, Murtasim and Meerab. Both people woven in the misalliance oppose the decision. Murtasim claims that Meerab is an insolent and mollycoddled girl that he dislikes the guts of, thus refusing to marry her. Meerab has a similar opinion as well and wishes to be kept away from an unruly man like Murtasim. Despite their personality clashes and blatant refusal, everyone urges them to agree as it is only better in the eyes of Salma Begum. Meanwhile, Haya is devastated by the thought of seeing the object of her infatuation being married off to someone else and begins to despise Meerab. Mariam, Murtasim's younger sister, tries to make Haya discern the consequences of her far-fetched devotion.

Meerab's hatred towards Murtasim continues to flourish as after a lot of entreaties, her parents refuse to change their decisions and try to make her adjust to the fact that Murtasim is the man of dreams and will keep her happy. She doesn't stop imploring her father to defy Salma Begum's decision and take her to her home in Karachi. Meerab is left in disbelief as a family secret from the past resurfaces before her. It is revealed that Muratism's uncle Anwar is the biological father of Meerab who abandoned her after the demise of his wife and Meerab's mother, Nazia, during childbirth. Meerab married Murtasim under a condition. This makes her question her whole life and identity because now she has suddenly become Meerab Anwar Khan while she has been Meerab Waqas Ahmad since childhood.

== Cast ==
=== Main ===
- Wahaj Ali as Murtasim Shahnawaz Khan — Shahnawaz and Salma's son; Mariyam's older brother; Meerab's husband; Meesam's father.
- Yumna Zaidi as Meerab Murtasim Khan (nee Anwar Khan/Waqas Ahmad) — Anwar and Nazia's biological daughter; Waqas and Anila's foster daughter; Murtasim's wife; Meesam's mother.

=== Recurring ===
- Bushra Ansari as Begum Salma Khan — Shahnawaz's widow; Murtasim and Mariyam's mother.
- Sabeena Farooq as Haya Ikram Khan — Murtasim, Mariyam and Meerab's cousin.
- Sohail Sameer as Anwar Khan — Nadia's widower; Shahnawaz's younger brother; Meerab's biological father.
- Farhan Ally Agha as Waqas Ahmad — Anila's husband; Shahnawaz and Anwar's friend; Meerab's foster father.
- Fazila Qazi as Anila Waqas Ahmad — Waqas's wife; Meerab's Foster mother.
- Hira Soomro as Mariyam Naurez Khan (nee Shahnawaz Khan) — Shahnawaz and Salma's daughter; Murtasim's younger sister; Anas's ex lover; Naurez's wife.
- Subhan Awan as Rohail — Meerab's friend and one-sided lover.
- Talia Jan as Saba — Meerab and Rohail's friend.
- Mehmood Aslam as Malik Mukhtar — Murtasim's rival; Zubair's father.
- Agha Mustafa Hassan as Malik Zubair/Anas — Mukhtar's son; Murtasim's rival; Mariyam's fake ex lover.
- Seemi Pasha as Sabra Khan — Naurez's mother.
- Haris Waheed as Naurez Khan — Haya's ex-fiancé; Mariyam's husband; Sabra's son.
- Asim Mehmood as Farukkh Khan — A Pathan transporter; Meerab's aide.
- Umaiza Fatima (child actor) as Meesam Murtasim Khan — Murtasim and Meerab's daughter.
- Shahzad Malik as Bakhtawar aka Bakhtu - Murtasim's loyal assistant.

== Production ==
The series was announced by Abdullah Kadwani and Asad Qureshi under 7th Sky Entertainment, for Geo TV. Director Siraj ul Haq said that he found the script "original and relevant". He further said that the "conflict between the lead characters was interesting" to depict on the screen.

It marks the second on-screen collaboration of Wahaj Ali and Yumna Zaidi after Dil Na Umeed To Nahi. The series was released on 28 December 2022 and aired every Wednesday and Thursday at 8pm until 6 July 2023.

== Soundtrack ==
Tere Bin

Soundtrack album by Shani Arshad
- Genre: Melancholic Classical Pop
- Length: 5:34
- Language: Urdu
- Producers: Abdullah Kadwani; Asad Qureshi

The theme song Kya Hoti Hai Bewafai is sung by Shani Arshad and Nirmal Roy. It is composed by Shani Arshad.

Tracklist
No.	Title	Singer(s)	Length
1.	"Tere Bin (Original Soundtrack)" (OST)	Shani Arshad	5:34
2.	"Tere Bin (Female Version OST)"	Nirmal Roy	5:34
3.	"Dil Hei Mera Dard Hai" (Additional OST)	Shani Arshad	2:58
4.	"Dholla (Original Soundtrack)" (Additional OST)	Shahid Ali Sonu, Nirmala Maghani	4:32
5.	"Maula Meri Arziyaan" (Aired during episode 6 and 7)

== Reception ==
=== Critical and digital response ===
The series has received mixed reviews for its storyline, writing, and dialogues, though the performance of Ali, direction and soundtrack were well acclaimed. The on-screen pairing of the leads has been appreciated and was the main reason for its popularity.

It has trended on Twitter and was number 1 on YouTube in India, Pakistan and Bangladesh throughout. Most of the episodes trended at #1 in Pakistan and India's trending lists and almost every episode was in Pakistan's YouTube trending list. Its last episode was trending in more than 6 countries on YouTube It is the most watched Pakistani drama series ever, on YouTube, reaching over 3.5 Billion views whilst still on air and has gained the highest TRPs (in past 3 years) throughout its airing on television.

The series also faced heavy backlash following the end of the 46th episode and when its upcoming episode's promo hinted at marital rape. A notice was served by *PEMRA

However, the producers allegedly edited the episode and tweaked the scenario to make it look like a consensual act.

=== Television ratings ===
Tere Bin is the most-watched drama of 2021–2023 in Pakistan. It's topped the trp chart every week consistently. The series received its second highest trp of 18.2, for the past 3 years (21, 22, and 2023) across all entertainment channels for episode 44 and 47 and received the highest trp of 18.6, for past 3 years (21, 22, and 2023) across all entertainment channels for episode 49.
