= Teri Meri Kahaniyaan =

2023 Pakistani anthology film

- Theatrical Release Poster
- Directed by: Nabeel Qureshi; Marina Khan; Nadeem Baig
- Written by: Ali Abbas Naqvi; Basit Naqvi; Vasay Chaudhary; Khalil-ur-Rehman Qamar
- Starring: Hira Mani; Mani; Ramsha Khan; Sheheryar Munawar; Wahaj Ali; Mehwish Hayat; Zahid Ahmed; Amna Ilyas; Falak Shahzad Khan
- Music by: Shuja Haider
- Production companies: SeePrime; Hum Films
- Release date: 29 June 2023
- Running time: 129 minutes
- Country: Pakistan
- Language: Urdu
- Budget: 08 Crore
- Box office: Rs. 14 crore (US$500,000)

Teri Meri Kahaniyaan (transl. Our Stories) is a 2023 Pakistani anthology film comprising three short films, directed by Nabeel Qureshi, Marina Khan (in her feature film directorial debut), and Nadeem Baig based on scripts by Ali Abbas Naqvi and Basit Naqvi, Vasay Chaudhary and Khalil-ur-Rehman Qamar respectively. The film stars an ensemble cast of Hira Mani, Mani, Ramsha Khan, Sheheryar Munawar, Wahaj Ali, Mehwish Hayat, Zahid Ahmed and Amna Ilyas. The film was released on 29 June 2023, on Eid-ul-Azha.

== Plot ==
=== Jin Mahal ===
- directed by Nabeel Qureshi

Shahanshah's family faces a financial crisis following the COVID-19 lockdowns. They initially live in an abandoned train before moving to Sajan Mahal, an old house in Karachi. There, they encounter spooky experiences that scare others away. Mumtaz and Shahanshah seek ways to earn money, and when the residents become frightened, they contact Maria Ansari, the building owner, who uncovers the truth.

Cast

- Hira Mani as Mumtaz Mahal
- Mani as Shahanshah
- Gul-e-Rana as Razia Sultana
- Falak Shahzad Khan as Jahangir
- Khushi Maheen as Anarkali
- Muhammad Hussain Naveed as Alamgir
- Irfan Motiwala as State Agent
- Salma Zafar Asim as Maria Ansari
- Hina Rizvi as Parlour's owner

=== Pasoori ===
- directed by Marina Khan (her directorial debut)

Rumaisa, a passionate singer, receives a selection letter for a singing competition just one day before her wedding. Confident in her abilities, she persuades her fiancé Salman to support her, despite his strict adherence to schedules. Salman's father arrives on time, despite Rumaisa's attempts to stop him. Despite facing criticism, Salman supports her decision and takes her to the show, where she performs.

Cast

- Ramsha Khan as Rumaisa
- Sheheryar Munawar as Salman
- Laila Wasti as Salman's mother
- Babar Ali as Salman's father
- Saleem Sheikh as Rumaisa's father
- Ayesha Gul as Rumaisa's mother
- Musadiq Malek as Subuktageen
- Raza Talish as Aamir
- Hurriya Mansoor as Neha
- Aadi Khan as Rumaisa's brother
- Ali Safina as host of competition

=== Ek Sau Taeeswan ===
- directed by Nadeem Baig

On her journey from Nawabshah to Karachi, Sadaf encounters a young banker named Asad, who flirts with her. Sadaf's husband, Afaq, calls her, and she confides in Asad about her husband's infidelities. Asad advises her to seek revenge by forming relationships, but she rejects the idea. Feeling guilty and empathetic, Asad decides to leave her with different intentions.

Cast

- Mehwish Hayat as Sadaf
- Wahaj Ali as Asad
- Zahid Ahmed as Afaq
- Amna Ilyas as Dania
- Arjumand Rahim as Mrs. Qutub-ud-Din
- Khaled Anam as Qutub-ud-Din
- Adnan Samad Khan as man on train
- Mashal Khan as Amna

== Production ==
In February 2023, during the filming of Jin Mahal in an urban area of Karachi, Qureshi and the cast members including Hira, Mani and Gul-e-Rana were attacked by the residents of there. The cast members were officially revealed by SeePrime on 19 May 2023. Jin Mahal was originally made as a short film for the YouTube channel of SeePrime, however on observing its cinematic shots the producers decided to release it as a feature film.

The film marked the cinematic debut of television actors Hira Mani (from Jin Mahal) and Wahaj Ali (from Ek Sau Taeeswan). Mani played a non-glamourised role in the film and talking about it she stated, "I figured someone has to take up a role like this. I'm proud that I'd be the first one!" With Pasoori, actress Marina Khan also made her feature film directorial debut who previously directed television series as well.

== Release ==
The trailer of the film was released on 2 June 2023, and the film released on 29 June 2023 nationwide.

== Soundtrack ==
Teri Meri Kahaniyaan

Film score by Shuja Haider
- Released: 2023
- Recorded: 2022–2023
- Genre: Feature film soundtrack
- Length: 3:47
- Label: See Tunes
- Producer: Shuja Haider

The film soundtrack album was released by See Tunes in 2023. It consists of a single composed and performed by Shuja Haider.

No.	Title	Music	Singer(s)	Length
1.	"Kahaniyaan"	Shuja Haider	Shuja Haider	3:47
Total length:				3:47

== Reception ==
Dawn Images praised Nabeel Qureshi's direction, the performances of the children, Hira Mani and Gul-e-Rana and the cinematography by Rana Kamran. The reviewer praised Babar Ali's performance in Pasoori and states the film as a space filler between the two. In Ek Sau Taeeswan's review, the reviewer praised the performances of the actors especially Zahid Ahmed.

Afreen Seher of The News International praised the performances of Hira Mani and Gul-e-Rana with major praise for the location and art direction of Jin Mahal. While reviewing the Ek Sau Taeeswan, the reviewer praised the Arjumand Rahim's performance. The reviewer stated the Qamar's script as problematic and the messaging as sexist and puke-worthy.

== See also ==
- List of Pakistani films of 2023
