= Shahid Shafaat =

Pakistani director, writer

- Born: Karachi, Pakistan
- Occupations: Television director; screenwriter
- Years active: 2010-present
- Spouse: Sania Saeed (m. 1998; div. 2025)

Shahid Shafaat (Urdu: شاہد شفاعت) is a Pakistani director, writer, producer and actor who works in television, film and theatre. Mostly known for his work as a director, Shafaat started his on-screen career in the early 2000s and directed more than 10 television plays. He received Lux Style Award nomination as Best TV Director for Dil Mom Ka Diya.

== Career ==
Shafaat started his career in theatre. He directed several plays, most notably Main Adakara Banu Gi. He directed the series Kaafir in 2012, which received critical praise, but was a commercial failure. In 2016, he directed Next Level Entertainment's production, Khuda Mera Bhi Hai. The series received critical acclaim. In 2018, he directed Khasara, which was a commercial success. His next play was another Next level Entertainment production, Dil Mom Ka Diya which became the highest-rated play in Pakistani television history. He then ventured in social causes television series, including Surkh Chandni and Bikhray Moti .

== Filmography ==
=== Television ===
Year	Title	Network	Notes
2011	Lamha Lamha Zindagi	ARY Digital	
2012	Kaafir	ARY Digital	
2013	Darmiyaan	ARY Digital	
2016–17	Khuda Mera Bhi Hai	ARY Digital	
2017–18	Tau Dil Ka Kia Hua	Hum TV	
2018	Khasara	ARY Digital	
2018	Dil Mom Ka Diya	ARY Digital	
2019	Surkh Chandni	ARY Digital	
2020	Bikhray Moti	ARY Digital	
2020–21	Faryaad	ARY Digital	
2021–22	Amanat	ARY Digital	
2022	Bakhtawar	Hum TV	
2023	Muhabbat Gumshuda Meri	Hum TV	
2024	Duniyapur	Green Entertainment	
2025	Ishq Di Chashni	Green Entertainment	

== Accolades ==
Date of ceremony	Awards	Category	Work	Result	Refs.
2019	Lux Style Awards	Best Television Director	Dil Mom Ka Diya	Nominated	
2023	Lux Style Awards	Best Television Director	Bakhtawar	Nominated	
