= Zafar Mairaj =

Pakistani engineer and writer (born 1968)

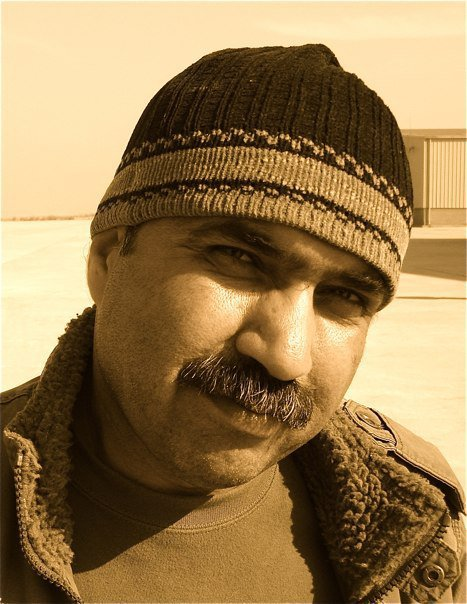
- Born: Zafar Mairaj Mashwani; 11 October 1968 (age 57); Mastung, West Pakistan (present-day Balochistan, Pakistan)
- Occupations: Civil engineer, drama writer, lyricist, poet, short-story writer
- Years active: 1991–present

Zafar Mairaj (Urdu, Balochi, Brahui: ظفر معراج; born 11 October 1968) is a Pakistani playwright, lyricist and short story writer. He primarily writes in Urdu but has also written in Brahui and Balochi. He has written more than fifty drama serials, plays and telefilms.

Zafar is known for Kabuli Pulao (2023), Muhabbat Ki Akhri Kahani (2023) and Dil Wali Gali Mein (2025).

== Early life and education ==
Zafar Mairaj was born on 11 October 1968 in Mastung, Balochistan, into a Baloch family.

He completed his matriculation at Helper Public School and intermediate studies at Tameer‑e‑Nau Public College, Quetta, before earning a Bachelor of Science in Civil Engineering from Balochistan University of Engineering and Technology (BUET), Khuzdar.

== Career ==
While pursuing his degree, Mairaj began writing short stories and opinion columns for local Urdu- and English-language publications and took part in literary events. After a short stint in journalism, he penned his first long-form television play, Amarbail, which aired on Pakistan Television (PTV) in 1991.

== Filmography ==
=== Television series ===
Year	Title	Notes	Ref.
1991	Amarbail		
1994	Shantul	in Balochi language	
1995	Shantul		
1995	Safar		
1996	Ajnabee		
1997	Ijazat		
1997	Dozakh		
2001	Daddy		
2001	Kisay Wakeel Karain		
2002	Allap		
2004	Werdi		
2004	Masuri		
2004	Mahnoor		
2004	Sufaid posh		
2005	Muqadddas		
2005	Laadla		
2006	Koh Zade		
2006	Maa aur Mamta		
2007	Pakistan Ka Matlab Kya...	Television film	
2007	Lyari express		
2007	Vanee		
2007	Shikwah		
2007	Aurat Aur Char Devari		
2008	Mehmaan		
2008	Mann Se Pocho		
2009	Mulaqat		
2009	Ishq Ki Inteha		
2009	Darwaza		
2010	Intezar		
2010	Zafar Mairaj Ki Kahaniyan		
2010	Ghar Ki Khatir		
2011	Kesi Yeh Agan		
2011	Palki		
2015	Ashk		
2015	Mehram		
2016	Sangat		
2017	Dumpukht - Aatish-e-Ishq		
2017	Munkir		
2017	Qurban		
2018	Lashkara		
2019	Marham		
2019	Inkaar		
2023	Kabuli Pulao		
2024	Mann Jogi	Miniseries	
2025	Dil Wali Gali Mein	Ramadan special	
2025	Biryani		

== Awards and nominations ==
Year	Ceremony / Award	Category	Project	Result
1996	PTV Awards	Best Writer – Drama Serial	Shantul	Won
1997	PTV Awards	Best Writer – Drama Serial	Ijazat	Nominated
2001	PTV Awards	Best Writer – Drama Serial	Kisay Wakeel Karain	Nominated
2003	Indus Telefilm Festival	Best Writer – TV Film	Murad	Won
2004	PTV Awards	Best Writer – Drama Serial	Masuri	Nominated
2005	1st Indus Drama Awards	Best Writer – Drama Series	Maa Aur Mamta	Won
2006	PTV Awards	Best Writer – Independent Play	Kohzade	Won
2007	PTV Awards	Best Writer – Independent Play	Pakistan Ka Matlab Kya!	Won
2007	Indus Drama Awards	Best Writer – Drama Series	Aurat Aur Chardiwari	Won
2007	PTV Awards	Best Writer – Drama Serial	Lyari Express	Won
2008	PTV Awards	Best Writer – Telefilm	Pehla Pathar	Won
2010	PTV Awards	Best Writer – Drama Serial	Darwaza	Nominated

=== Lux Style Awards ===
Ceremony	Category	Project	Result
9th Lux Style Awards	Best Television Writer	Darwaza	Nominated
10th Lux Style Awards	Best Television Writer	Ghar Ki Khatir	Nominated
16th Lux Style Awards	Best Television Writer	Dampukht	Nominated
17th Lux Style Awards	Best Television Writer	Muqabil	Nominated
19th Lux Style Awards	Best Television Writer	Inkaar	Nominated
23rd Lux Style Awards	Best TV Play Writer (Critic’s Choice)	Kabli Pulao	Won
