= Kabuli Pulao =

2023 Pakistani television series

- Title card
- Genre: Drama; Romance; Thriller
- Written by: Zafar Mairaj
- Directed by: Kashif Nisar
- Creative director: Muhammad Awais
- Starring: Mohammed Ehteshamuddin; Sabeena Farooq; Nadia Afghan; Abdullah Farhatullah
- Theme music composer: Sahir Ali Bagga
- Opening theme: "Ankhain" by Rahat Fateh Ali Khan
- Composer: Sahir Ali Bagga
- Country of origin: Pakistan
- Original languages: Urdu; Pashto
- No. of seasons: 1
- No. of episodes: 19

Production
- Executive producer: Imran Raza
- Producer: Qaiser Ali
- Camera setup: Multi-camera setup
- Running time: approx. 40 minutes
- Production companies: Q&K Productions; Multiverse Entertainment

Original release
- Network: Green Entertainment
- Release: 11 July – 21 November 2023

Kabli Pulao (Urdu: کابلی پلاؤ) is a 2023 Pakistani television series. It is directed by Kashif Nisar and written by Zafar Mairaj. It features Mohammed Ehteshamuddin, Sabeena Farooq, Nadia Afgan and Abdullah Farhatullah. The first episode of the series aired on 11 July 2023 on Green Entertainment. It is the romantic tale of two individuals, a Lahori Punjabi man and an Afghan refugee girl who end up married. They not only come from different cultures, do not know each other's language , but also have a great age difference.

The series received critical acclaim for the performances of the leads and Mairaj's script.

== Plot ==
“Kabli Pulao” tells the touching story of Haji Mushtaq, a kind-hearted man from Lahore, and Barbeena, an apparently widowed young Afghan woman. Haji Mushtaq, a 51-year-old Punjabi bachelor, lives a quiet and simple life—until he meets Barbeena during a religious visit to Mardan. While staying at a mosque, he meets her brother, who asks if anyone would marry Barbeena, but only if they paid him for it. Haji Mushtaq gently advises him that asking for money in return for marriage isn’t right. He later finds out the money is actually for their other brother’s operation, who has lost the use of his legs. Wanting to help, Haji gives them the money without agreeing to marry Barbeena.

However, Barbeena later insists on marrying Haji out of gratitude. Her brother also urges the marriage to protect her from her late husband’s brother, who wants to marry her against her will. Despite trying to avoid it, Haji Mushtaq eventually agrees to marry her for her safety and peace of mind.

Back in Lahore, his childhood neighbour Shamim—who’s always held out hope that Haji would one day marry her—is heartbroken. At the same time, Haji’s niece Ayesha refuses to attend her engagement unless her uncle comes back home. Haji returns with Barbeena but introduces her as a maid who’s come to help around the house out of gratitude for his support. He lives with his younger brother, Chaudhry Qayyum, and his family. Before long, Barbeena wins everyone over with her caring nature and fits in well, especially bonding with Qayyum’s sisters.

Things take a turn when Barbeena’s older brother visits her in Lahore. Ilyas, a police inspector from Haji’s hometown who holds a grudge against him, finds out about the marriage and tells Shamim. They both arrive uninvited with a Khawaja Sara to publicly shame Haji for marrying a much younger woman in secret. The revelation shocks the family, but most begin to turn against Shamim for how she handled the situation. Haji’s elder sister Farzana supports him and insists they celebrate the marriage properly with a grand walima.

However, Haji’s younger sister, Chammo, is stuck in an unhappy marriage. Her husband, Ghaffar, resents her because she cannot have children. After discovering Haji’s marriage to Barbeena, Ghaffar becomes furious and kicks Chammo out. He only agrees to take her back if Haji leaves the city with Barbeena. Wanting peace in the family, Haji pretends they’re attending Barbeena’s brother’s funeral and leaves.

They head back to Mardan, only to find that Haji’s friend, a Mawlawi he hoped to live with, has passed away. Lost and troubled, they make their way to Rawalpindi, where they meet Hayat, a warm-hearted hotel owner who offers them a place to stay in her daughter’s home. Hayat hopes that the presence of an older, wiser couple will help ease the constant arguments between her daughter, Hajra, and son-in-law Asad.

Haji and Barbeena begin their new life there, earning money by selling Kabuli Pulao. At first, business is slow—but once Barbeena takes over selling it, the dish becomes a local favourite. Hajra, who once dreamt of becoming a filmmaker but had lost her passion, finds new inspiration in the couple. She secretly films their everyday life for a documentary, only to later realise the beauty and quiet respect in their relationship. Touched by what she’s captured, she releases the film online, where it quickly goes viral.

Haji’s family, still searching for him, discover their whereabouts through the documentary. Qayyum and Ghaffar travel to bring him back—but tragedy strikes when Qayyum dies in a road accident. The family returns to Lahore, bringing Qayyum’s body home, finally reunited but marked by both sorrow and a deeper understanding of love, sacrifice, and family.

== Cast ==
=== Main ===
- Mohammed Ehteshamuddin as Haji Mushtaq: Barbeena's husband
- Sabeena Farooq as Barbeena: Haji Mushtaq's wife
- Nadia Afgan as Shamin: in love with Haji Mushtaq

=== Supporting ===
- Adnan Shah Tipu as Chaudhry Qayyum : Haji Mushtaq's younger brother.
- Munazzah Arif as Zubaida : Qayyum's wife.
- Fajjar Khan as Ayesha : Qayyum's eldest daughter.
- Momina Faiq Bajwa as Rimsha : Qayyum's younger daughter.
- Haseeb Khan as Zakir : Kulsoom's husband.
- Farzana Taheem as Kulsoom : Haji Mushtaq's elder sister.
- Raima Khan as Chammo: Haji Mushtaq's sister and Ghaffar Butt's wife.
- Saqib Sumeer as Ghaffar Butt: Chammo's husband.
- Umer Dar as Inspector Ilyas.
- Abdullah Farhatullah as Baran Afghani: Barbeena's ex-husband.
- Faiz Chauhan as Hayat : Hajra's father; businessman.
- Naina as Hajra : Haji Mushtaq and Barbeena's landlord.
- Sikandar Nawaz as Asad : Hajra's husband.

== Production ==
=== Development ===
In February 2021, Kashif Nisar revealed that her upcoming series is about the relationship of two individuals who have a language barrier. Nadia Afgan was selected to portray one of the pivotal role. Nisar offered the role of Kulsoom to her, but she ended up playing the role of Shamim.

=== Broadcast ===
The series premier its first episode on 11 July 2023 airing weekly on Tuesday at 20:00 PST on Green Entertainment.It is based on 19 episodes with 35–40 minutes running time.

The series broadcast in India by Zindagi premiering on 11 November 2023, thus becoming the first ever Pakistani TV series with a simultaneous foreign broadcast.

== Soundtrack ==
"Ankhain"

Song by Rahat Fateh Ali Khan
- Language: Urdu
- Released: 23 May 2023
- Length: 4:31
- Label: Green Entertainment
- Songwriter: Imran Raza
- Composer: Sahir Ali Bagga
External media
Audio
- Lyrical song on YouTube
Video
- Music video on YouTube

The original soundtrack "Ankhain" was released in May 2023. It was performed by Rahat Fateh Ali Khan, music was composed by Sahir Ali Bagga and lyrics were penned by Imran Raza. The OST gained 100 million views on digital platforms of the network within 2 weeks.

== Reception ==
In a review by the Dawn, Sadaf Haider praised the series for the performances of several actors particularly Ehteshamuddin and Nadia Afgan, characterisation and Nisar's direction. Foha Raza of DAWN Images praised it for its realistic characters and themes such as emotional support, depiction of evolving relationships and judgment on looks.

In the year-end articles, The Express Tribune praised the script for the portrayal of unconventional saga of love and focusing the refugees, while Dawn Images noted its main theme and the performances of the leads.
