= Humaira Zaheer =

Pakistani actress

- Born: 8 September 1960 (age 65); Lahore, Pakistan
- Occupation: Actress
- Years active: 1980–present
- Children: 2

Humaira Zaheer is a Pakistani actress. She is known for her roles in dramas Bharosa Pyar Tera, Hiddat, Log Kya Kahenge, Shehr-e-Malal and Sehra Main Safar.

== Personal life ==
Zaheer is married to television director Zaheer Khan of Kiran Kahani and Zair Zabar Paish.

== Career ==
Zaheer started her career at the age of seven with stage, performing in the stage play Chacha Bhatijiyaan. She made her screen debut in the 1980s on PTV and was known for portraying sad lead roles. She was part of many television series on PTV Channel. She was noted for her roles in dramas Chemistry, Parsa, Sanjha, Mohabbat Rooth Jaye Toh and Mata-e-Jaan Hai Tu. She also appeared in drama Sehra Main Safar along with Zarnish Khan, Emmad Irfani, Aiman Khan and Anoushey Ashraf and Ab Kar Meri Rafugari with Ushna Shah and Daniyal Raheal. Since then she has appeared in the dramas Hiddat, Bharosa Pyar Tera, Shehr-e-Malal, Mausam and Log Kya Kahenge.

== Filmography ==
=== Television ===
Year	Title	Role	Network
1986	Show Time Boutique	Ms. Zuberi	PTV
1987	Telephone Time Show	Begum Graham	PTV
1988	Sirriyan	Khalida	PTV
1989	Lehrain	Sara	PTV
1992	Adam Hawa Aur Shaitan	Husna	PTV
1995	Kiya Bane Baat	Salma Begum	PTV
1996	Peela Jora	Silah's mother	PTV
2001	Colony 52	Shamsa	
2010	Chemistry	Kiran	Geo Entertainment
2010	Parsa	Waheeda	Hum TV
2011	Sanjha	Murad's mother	Hum TV
2011	Mohabbat Rooth Jaye Toh	Shumaila's mother	Hum TV
2012	Mata-e-Jaan Hai Tu	Haniya mother	Hum TV
2012	Yahan Pyar Nahin Hai	Saeem mother	Hum TV
2013	Khoya Khoya Chand	Shama	Hum TV
2014	Rasam	Sana	Geo TV
2014	Mausam	Shazia's mother	Hum TV
2015	Khilona	Aqeela	ARY Digital
2015	Chhoti Si Ghalat Fehmi	Durdana	Hum TV
2015	Aye Zindagi	Saba	Hum TV
2015	Inteqam	Sarim mother	Urdu 1
2015	Sehra Main Safar	Aliya	Hum TV
2016	Urdu Bechari	Amna's mother	PTV
2016	Ghayal	Asma	ARY Digital
2016	Ab Kar Meri Rafugari	Ayesha Taj	ARY Digital
2016	Main Kamli	Aapa	Aaj Entertainment
2017	Faisla	Asad's mother	ARY Digital
2017	Hiddat	Kulsoom	Geo Entertainment
2018	Dard Ka Rishta	Zulakha	ARY Digital
2019	Bharosa Pyar Tera	Maryam's mother	Geo TV
2020	Shehr-e-Malal	Minal's aunt	Express Entertainment
2020	Log Kya Kahenge	Aabi	ARY Digital

=== Telefilm ===
Year	Title	Role
2019	Judaai	Zara's mother
