= Baandi =

Pakistani television serial

- Left to right: Muneeb Butt, Hina Dilpazeer, Aiman Khan, Yasir Hussain
- Genre: Serial drama Romance
- Created by: Moomal Entertainment
- Written by: Asma Nabeel
- Directed by: Ahmad Kamran
- Starring: Aiman Khan; Muneeb Butt; Yasir Hussain; Hina Dilpazeer
- Country of origin: Pakistan
- Original language: Urdu
- No. of seasons: 1
- No. of episodes: 33

Production
- Producer: Rafay Rashdi
- Camera setup: Multi-camera setup
- Production company: Moomal Entertainment

Original release
- Network: Hum TV
- Release: 14 September 2018 – 3 May 2019

Baandi (Urdu: باندی, lit. 'Slave Girl') is a Pakistani television serial directed by Syed Ahmed Kamran and written by Asma Nabeel. It started to air from 9 September 2018 on Hum TV. Aiman Khan and Muneeb Butt, who became a real-life couple in November 2018, played the lead roles.

== Plot summary ==
Set in the backdrop of the rural areas of Sindh, Bandi revolves around the daughter of a poor farmer, Meeru whose parents sold her as a maid for a rich family with the help of a woman in an attempt to save her from a rogue landlord of their village as her father is debtor of the landlord. Meeru's life takes a turn when the owner's son, Wali Ali Khan who is a police man falls for her.

== Cast ==
- Aiman Khan as Meeru
- Muneeb Butt as Wali Ali Khan
- Yasir Hussain as Tahawaar
- Hina Dilpazeer as Faiza Begum
- Noman Masood as Ali Faizan
- Hajra Yamin as Rameen
- Kamran Jillani as Aadi
- Daniyal Raheal as Farhan
- Alizeh Shah as Bakto
- Kinza Malik as Farhan's mother
- Khawaja Saleem as Babu Bahi
- Azeem Sajjad as Meeru's father

== Production ==
The serial has been written by Asma Nabeel who has 2017 hit serial Khaani in her credit and directed by Ahmad Kamran who previously directed acclaimed serials Mohabbat Aag Si and Zun Mureed for Hum TV. Aiman Khan and Muneeb Butt are finalised for lead roles while Yasir Hussain as antagonist. Hina Dilpazeer will also be seen in a vital character. Speaking about the series, Yasir revealed to instep. "There are multiple tracks in the play", he further said, "One of them features Aiman and my character; and we both come from the same village, of which I am the wadera".

It was the sixth project featuring real life couple Butt and Khan together after Bay Qasoor (2015), Googly Muhalla (2015), Khatoon Manzil (2015), Khwab Saraye (2016) and Zindaan (2017).

== Soundtrack ==
Baandi - OST

Soundtrack album by Sahir Ali Bagga and Beena Khan
- Released: 27 September 2018
- Recorded: 2018
- Genre: Television soundtrack
- Length: (2:38)
- Language: Urdu
- Label: Hum TV

Music video
- "Baandil" OST on YouTube

The title song was sung by Sahir Ali Bagga and Beena Khan. The music was composed by Sahir Ali Bagga and the lyrics were written by Asma Nabeel.

== Accolades ==
Awards	Category	Recipient	Result	Ref(s)
Hum Awards	Best Director Drama Serial	Ahmad Kamran	Nominated	
Hum Awards	Most Impactful Character	Hina Dilpazeer	Nominated	
Hum Awards	Best Writer Drama Serial	Asma Nabeel	Nominated	
Hum Awards	Best Onscreen Couple	Aiman Khan & Muneeb Butt	Nominated	
Hum Awards	Best Drama Serial	Baandi	Nominated	
Hum Awards	Best Actor in a Leading Role	Muneeb Butt	Nominated	
Hum Awards	Best Actress in a Leading Role	Aiman Khan	Nominated	
Hum Awards	Best Actress in a Leading Role	Hajra Yamin	Nominated	
Hum Awards	Best Actor in a Supporting Role	Yasir Hussain	Won	
Hum Awards	Best Actor in a Negative Role	Yasir Hussain	Nominated	

== See also ==
- List of programs broadcast by Hum TV
