= Ishq Mein Tere Sadqay =

2026 Pakistani television series

- Genre: Drama
- Written by: Rehana Aftab
- Directed by: Saima Waseem
- Starring: Muneeb Butt; Anika Zulfikar; Ali Abbas
- Country of origin: Pakistan
- Original language: Urdu
- No. of episodes: 43

Production
- Producers: Abdullah Kadwani; Asad Qureshi
- Production company: 7th Sky Entertainment

Original release
- Network: Geo Entertainment
- Release: 13 February – 23 March 2026

Ishq Mein Tere Sadqay is a 2026 Pakistani television drama series written by Rehana Aftab and directed by Saima Waseem. Produced by Abdullah Kadwani and Asad Qureshi under the banner of 7th Sky Entertainment, the series stars Muneeb Butt and Anika Zulfikar in leading roles, alongside Ali Abbas and Saba Faisal. It premiered on Geo Entertainment on 13 February 2026.

== Plot ==
The story follows Zulfiqar Shah, a wealthy man whose impulsive behaviour affects his personal relationships. He marries Hoor despite opposition from his family. Their relationship is disrupted by a tragedy that results in Hoor's death. Zulfiqar later encounters Noor, Hoor's identical twin sister, and becomes involved in her life.

Noor faces difficulties in her marriage to Salar, a man who conceals his romantic involvement with another woman. As the characters' lives intersect, the story explores grief, family conflict, deception and the consequences of obsessive attachment.

== Cast ==
- Muneeb Butt as Zulfiqar Shah
- Anika Zulfikar as Hoor and Noor
- Ali Abbas as Salar
- Saba Faisal as Anjum
- Shabbir Jaan as Murtaza
- Saba Hamid as Zulfiqar's mother
- Mahmood Aslam as Iftikhar Shah
- Farhan Ally Agha as Ahmed
- Behroze Sabzwari as Jawad
- Ayesha Gul as Sajda
- Zohreh Amir as Arooshma
- Yusra Irfan as Shiza
- Afifa Shaikh as Maria
- Malaika Riaz as Farah
- Arsala as Mehwish
