= Dekh Zara Pyar Se =

Pakistani television series

- Written by: Saima Akram Chaudhry
- Directed by: Ali Hassan
- Starring: Yumna Zaidi; Hamza Sohail
- Country of origin: Pakistan
- Original language: Urdu
- No. of seasons: 1

Production
- Producer: Momina Duraid
- Production company: Momina Duraid Productions

Original release
- Network: Hum TV
- Release: 19 February – 23 March 2026

Dekh Zara Pyar Se is a Pakistani romantic comedy television series written by Saima Akram Chaudhry, directed by Ali Hassan and produced by Momina Duraid under Momina Duraid Productions. The series premiered on Hum TV on 19 February 2026 during the month of Ramadan.

The story follows Romaila (Yumna Zaidi), a woman whose experiences growing up following her parents' separation have influenced her independent outlook on life and relationships. Her life intersects with that of Zoraiz Ali Khan (Hamza Sohail), an advertising professional who experienced the loss of his parents at a young age. As their relationship develops, both characters navigate personal experiences and family expectations.

== Cast ==
- Yumna Zaidi as Romaila
- Hamza Sohail as Zoraiz Ali Khan
- Bushra Ansari
- Arshad Mehmood
- Saleem Sheikh
- Romaisa Khan
- Ramesha Nawal
- Momina Munir
- Zain Sajid
- Mustafa Rehman
