= With Samina Peerzada =

Pakistani web television talk show

- Season 2 Official Poster
- Also known as: Rewind with Samina Peerzada, Speak Your Heart
- Created by: Muhammad Adnan Butt; Samina Peerzada
- Directed by: Fahad Nur
- Presented by: Samina Peerzada
- Original language: Urdu
- No. of seasons: 3
- No. of episodes: 110

Production
- Producer: Muhammad Adnan Butt
- Production locations: Lahore, Punjab, Pakistan
- Running time: 30 - 65 minutes
- Production companies: Dot Republic Media; Creatorsone

Original release
- Network: YouTube
- Release: 22 December 2017 – present

With Samina Peerzada is a Pakistani web television talk show hosted by Samina Peerzada that first aired on 22 December 2017 on YouTube. The show was created by Peerzada in collaboration with Muhammad Adnan Butt, CEO Dot Republic Media. Each episode is separately sponsored and features a Pakistani celebrity interviewed by Peerzada about their journeys, struggles, challenges and success. Each season is titled differently.

== Production ==
Season 1 official poster

The series was developed by Adnan Butt and actress Samina Peerzada. Explaining on series, Peerzada said, "Adnan and I were figuring out how we could work together and I suggested that we begin with conducting interviews and possibly develop more projects such as web-series in the future. That’s pretty much how we started it out and I’m so happy that it’s being liked." Regarding choosing digital media over television medium, Samina quipped, "I think that’s the future and being in the media, you need to be aware of what is happening around you and how the attention span is evolving. The internet has made it so convenient for me to watch shows that I’ve missed. After coming home from work, I catch up on whatever I’ve missed out on over YouTube, for instance I’m watching Manto now."

== Episodes ==
=== Season 1: Rewind ===
Season 1 first aired on 22 December 2017 and concluded on 4 May 2018, comprising a total of twenty-three episodes. Following guest appeared in the first season.

- Ahsan Khan
- Mahira Khan
- Adnan Siddiqui
- Qurat-ul-Ain Balouch
- Iftikhar Thakur
- Momina Mustehsan
- Saieen Zahoor
- Ali Azmat
- Asim Azhar
- Inzamam-ul-Haq
- Junaid Khan
- Imad Wasim
- Mustansar Hussain Tarar
- Wahab Riaz
- Juggun Kazim
- Sana Mir
- Sarmad Khoosat
- Shuja Haider
- Meera
- Muhammad Amer (a.k.a. Rahim Pardesi)
- Sania Saeed
- Sarah Khan
- Uzair Jaswal

=== Season 2: Speak Your Heart ===
Season 2 premiered as Speak Your Heart on 10 May 2018 and concluded on 31 March 2019, comprising a total of sixty-six episodes. Following guest appeared in the second season.

- Aima Baig
- Hadiqa Kiani
- Mohsin Abbas Haider
- Bilal Khan
- Ushna Shah
- Sheheryar Munawar
- Salman Shahid
- Nabila
- Usman Peerzada
- Shuja Haider
- Maya Ali
- Fasih Bari Khan
- Mawra Hocane
- Ahmad Ali Butt
- Natasha Khan (Pakistani Singer)
- Ali Noor
- Hina Altaf
- Wahab Riaz and Inzamam-ul-Haq
- Noor Khan
- Ayub Khawar
- Junaid Khan and Imad Wasim
- Rabia Butt
- Sheherezade Alam
- Imran Abbas
- Yousuf Salahuddin
- Sanam Baloch
- Nilofer Shahid
- Hira Mani
- Naeem Tahir
- Sarwat Gilani
- Zeb Bangash
- (live stream)
- Hassan Sheheryar Yasin
- Masarrat Misbah
- Sanam Saeed
- Ali Zafar
- Haseena Moin
- Haissam Hussain
- Atif Aslam
- Komal Aziz Khan
- Agha Ali
- Bilal Abbas Khan
- Ali Abbas
- Tahira Syed
- Iqra Aziz
- Omair Rana
- Faizan Haqquee
- Sonya Hussyn
- Amjad Islam Amjad
- R M Naeem
- Faran Tahir
- Jawad Bashir
- Asma Abbas
- Rehan Sheikh
- Khalid Malik
- Nadia Afghan
- Moneeza Hashmi
- Munib Nawaz
- Reema Khan
- Fauzia Saeed
- Fahad Hussain
- Gohar Mumtaz
- Imran Qureshi
- Uzma Gillani
- Amanat Ali
- Guddu

=== Season 3: Rewind ===
Season 3 was renamed as Rewind again and premiered on 2 April 2019 and till now it has aired twenty-two episodes

- Savera Nadeem
- Nimra Khan
- Aiman Khan
- Mani
- Yumna Zaidi
- Affan Wahid
- Nabeel Shaukat
- Ramiz Raja
- Syed Jibran
- Samina Ahmed
- Emmad Irfani
- Nadia Jamil
- Adeel Hussain
- Muneeb Butt
- Faisal Rehman
- Marina Khan
- Usman Mukhtar
- Jibran Nasir
- Hareem Farooq
- Anoosh Masood
- Asghar Nadeem Syed
- Minal Khan
