= Sarwat Nazir =

Pakistani writer

Sarwat Nazir ثروت نذیر
- Born: 31 December. Lahore, Pakistan
- Occupations: Author, novelist, screenwriter, playwright
- Writing career
- Language: Urdu
- Notable works: Main Abdul Qadir Hoon; Umm-e-Kulsoom; Roshan Sitara; Do Bol
- Notable awards: 1st Hum Awards; Best Writer Drama Serial; Nominated for: Roshan Sitara Nominated for the best show for her show Dobol
- Website: www.facebook.com/pages/Sarwat-nazir/201029056604631

Sarwat Nazir (Urdu: ثروت نذیر) is a Pakistani fiction writer, novelist, screenwriter, and playwright. She is best known for her screenplays Main Abdul Qadir Hoon and Umm-e-Kulsoom. Another show was Do Bol.

== Selected works ==
=== Novels ===
The following novels have been written by Sarwat Nazir:

- Faislay Ka Lamha
- Roshan Sitara
- Main Abd-ul-Qadir Hum
- Sitamgar
- Umm-e-Kulsoom
- Roshan Sitara
- Muhabbat Aisa Darya ha
- Sirat-e-Mustaqeem
- Gawah Rehna
- Khuwab Hain Hum
- Sach ki Pari
- Faslay ka Lamha
- Besharam

=== Plays and dramas ===
She has written a number of plays in the past but has written more screenplays than novels in her more recent writing career:

- Main Abdul Qadir Hoon
- Besharam (TV series)
- Shikwa
- Mumkin
- Aik Pal
- Umm-e-Kulsoom
- Roshan Sitara
- Sitamgar (TV series)
- Sirat-e-Mustaqeem
- Tere Baghair
- Noor-e-Zindagi
- Sehra Main Safar
- Choti Si Zindagi
- Tanhai (TV series)
- Khaas
- Aas (TV drama)
- Qayamat (TV series)
- Pardes
- Dobara (TV series)

Year	Title	Network	Notes / References
2023	Yunhi	Hum TV	
2025	Dastak	ARY Digital	
2025	Jama Taqseem	Hum TV	

== Awards and nominations ==
- Nomination
  - Best Writer Drama Serial for Roshan Sitara at 1st Hum Awards 2013.

=== Lux Style Awards ===
Ceremony	Category	Project	Result
16th Lux Style Awards	Best Television Writer	Besharam	Nominated
19th Lux Style Awards	Best Television Writer	Khaas	Nominated
21st Lux Style Awards	Best Television Writer	Pardes	Nominated
