= Khwaab Ankhain Khwahish Chehre =

- Title screen
- Written by: Saira Aarif
- Directed by: Kaiser Khan Nizamani
- Starring: Kanwar Arsalan; Farhan Ally Agha; Rubina Ashraf; Lubna Aslam; Fazila Kaiser
- Theme music composer: Wajid Saeed
- Opening theme: Song written by Mohd Nasir performed by Fariha Pervaiz
- Country of origin: Pakistan
- Original language: Urdu

Production
- Executive producer: Fazila Kazi
- Editors: Malik Ali Imran; Imtiaz Hashmani
- Running time: ~18 minutes

Original release
- Network: Hum TV
- Release: 11 July 2011 – present

Khwaab Ankhain Khwahish Chehre (Urdu: خواب آنكهيں خواہش چہرے) is a Hum TV drama which started airing on 11 July 2011.

== Cast ==
- Rubina Ashraf
- Kanwar Arsalan
- Maria Zahid
- Lubna Aslam
- Fazila Qazi
- Zaheen Tahira
- Farhan Ally Agha
- Asad Malik
