= Neeyat =

Neeyat (lit. 'Intent') may refer to:

- Neeyat (TV series), a 2011 Pakistani drama
- Neeyat (1980 film), an Indian action romantic film by Anil Ganguly, starring Shashi Kapoor, Jeetendra, Rakesh Roshan and Rekha
- Neeyat (2023 film), a 2023 Indian Hindi-language mystery film by Anu Menon, starring Vidya Balan
