= Winter Love (TV series) =

2026 Pakistani television series

- Genre: Romantic drama
- Written by: Sarah Majeed
- Directed by: Danish Nawaz
- Starring: Mawra Hocane; Khushhal Khan
- Country of origin: Pakistan
- Original language: Urdu

Production
- Producer: Momina Duraid
- Production company: Momina Duraid Productions

Original release
- Network: Hum TV

Winter Love is a 2026 Pakistani romantic television series starring Mawra Hocane and Khushhal Khan. Written by Sarah Majeed and directed by Danish Nawaz, the series features the first on-screen pairing of Hocane and Khan.

== Cast ==
- Mawra Hocane as Mushk
- Khushhal Khan as Hayat
- Asif Raza Mir as Gulzar
- Asma Abbas as Gulnar

== Reception ==
In its television review published on 19 April 2026, Dawn described the series as an urban love story that moves away from conventional themes of honour and class conflict. The review discussed the contrasting personalities of its central characters, Hayat and Mushk, and highlighted the performances of Asif Raza Mir and Asma Abbas as Hayat's parents.
