= Yeh Ishq Samajh Na Aaye =

2022 Pakistani television series

- Title screen
- یہ عشق سمجھ نہ آئے
- Genre: Romance; Thriller
- Created by: Aur Life
- Written by: Mounam Majeed
- Directed by: Jasim Abbas
- Starring: Mikaal Zulfiqar; Zarnish Khan; Shehroz Sabzwari
- Country of origin: Pakistan
- Original language: Urdu
- No. of episodes: 28

Production
- Executive producer: Ali Shahroz
- Production locations: Islamabad, Pakistan
- Camera setup: Multi-camera setup
- Production company: Studio Vision Films

Original release
- Release: 20 February – 23 October 2022

Yeh Ishq Samajh Na Aaye is a Pakistani drama television series, directed by Jasim Abbas. It features Mikaal Zulfiqar, Zarnish Khan, Sharoze Sabzwari and Syeda Tuba Anwar in lead roles.

== Cast ==
- Mikaal Zulfiqar as Hassan
- Zarnish Khan as Rida Hassan
- Shehroz Sabzwari as Shahaan
- Syeda Tuba Anwar as Nimra
- Saleem Sheikh as Jan Muhammad
- Waseem Tirmazi as Fahad

== Production ==
=== Released ===
Initially, "Yeh Ishq Samajh Na Aaye" was speculated to be released on ARY Digital, However, later it was revealed that it will air on new channel Aur Life on its launch. The teasers of the drama released in January 2022. It premiered on 20 February 2022, airing weekly episodes on Sundays at 8:00 PM.
