= Yeh Na Thi Hamari Qismat =

2022 Pakistani television series

- Genre: Drama
- Written by: Seema Munaf
- Directed by: Syed Ali Raza Usama
- Starring: Hira Mani; Muneeb Butt; Noor Hassan Rizvi; Aiza Awan
- Theme music composer: Nabeel Shaukat Ali; Yashal Shahid
- Country of origin: Pakistan
- Original language: Urdu
- No. of episodes: 32

Production
- Executive producer: Nadeem Baig
- Producers: Humayun Saeed; Shahzad Nasib; Sana Humayun Saeed; Sana Shahnawaz
- Production companies: Six Sigma Plus; Next Level Entertainment

Original release
- Network: ARY Digital
- Release: 24 January – 17 March 2022

Yeh Na Thi Hamari Qismat (transl. This was not our fate) is a 2023 Pakistani family drama television serial produced by Humayun Saeed and Shahzad Nasib in collaboration with Sana Humayun Saeed and Sana Shahnawaz under the banner Six Sigma Plus and Next Level Entertainment. Directed by Syed Ali Raza Usama, it aired from 24 January 2022 to 17 March 2022 on ARY Digital, consisting of 32 episodes. Hira Mani, Muneeb Butt, Noor Hassan Rizvi and Aiza Awan played the main roles.

The serial received positive reviews from the audience due to its realistic plot and praised Butt and Mani's chemistry in the serial.

== Cast ==
- Hira Mani as Muntaha — a responsible and innocent girl; Alishba's sister. She was engaged to Yasir but due to an incident on the night of her wedding, she had to marry Ayaan compulsively.
- Muneeb Butt as Ayaan — an irresponsible and carefree guy, trying to take shortcuts in life; Muntaha's husband.
- Aiza Awan as Alishba — a carefree and bubbly girl, Muntaha's sister. She was married to her sister's fiancé, Yasir when she couldn't reach wedding venue due to mugging.
- Noor Hassan Rizvi/Haroon Shahid as Yasir — a well-settled guy, Muntaha's fiancé; Alishba's husband.
- Saba Faisal as Sajida — Ayaan and Mehnaz's mother; Khalid's wife; Muntaha's mother-in-law
- Khaled Anam as Khalid — Ayaan and Mehnaz's father; Sajida's husband; Muntaha's father-in-law; Sarmad and Shireen younger brother
- Annie Zaidi as Aasiya — Yasir's mother; Sarmad's wife; Alishba's mother-in-law
- Shehryar Zaidi as Sarmad — Yasir's father; Aasiya's husband; Alishba's father-in-law; Shireen and Khalid's elder brother
- Salma Hassan as Aneela — Muntaha and Alishba's mother; Ayaaz's wife
- Raja Haider as Ayaaz — Muntaha and Alishba's father; Aneela's husband
- Kinza Malik as Shireen — Sarmad and Khalid's sister; Saniya's mother
- Aamna Malick as Saniya — Shireen's daughter; wanted to marry Ayaan
- Hafsa Butt as Mehnaz — Ayaan's sister
- Zehra Fatima as Rabia — Muntaha's friend
- Faisal Shehzad as Saad — Ayaan's friend
- Rauf Bhutta as Fahad — Saniya's fiancé

== Production ==
=== Casting ===
Due to a leg surgery, Rizvi had to leave the show midway and his character was replaced by Shahid where he portrayed "Yasir" in the last four episodes of the show. However, viewers criticized the makers for the decision and was unhappy with the replacement.

=== Promotions ===
Cast of the serial appeared in Nida Yasir's, "Good Morning Pakistan" for promotion of the serial where Mani's unusual dressing caught attention of the viewers by wearing a casual Nike shirt along with Saree.
