= Laaj (TV series) =

Pakistani TV series

- Genre: Drama; Serial drama
- Created by: Fahim Burney
- Developed by: Fahim Burney and Moomal Productions
- Written by: Edison Idrees Masih
- Screenplay by: Edison
- Story by: Erum Wasi; Saima Wasi
- Directed by: Fahim Burney
- Theme music composer: Sohail Haider
- Opening theme: 'Laaj' by Faiza Mujahid
- Country of origin: Pakistan
- Original language: Urdu
- No. of episodes: 17

Production
- Executive producer: Fahim Burney
- Producer: Momina Duraid
- Production locations: Lahore, Muridke
- Cinematography: Adnan Ahmed
- Editor: Danish Usmani
- Camera setup: Multi-camera setup
- Running time: 30-45 minutes

Original release
- Network: Hum TV
- Release: 23 July – 26 November 2016

Laaj (Urdu: لاج; lit:Respect) is a Pakistani romantic television series that was aired on 23 July 2016. Created by Momina Duraid, the series stars Iqra Aziz, Kamran Jilani and Zarnish Khan.

== Plot ==
This is a story of arrogance. Bari Sahab is a widowed head of a house. Her husband's brother, Sikandar, is jealous and is against her. Sikandar has a son, Dilawar, who is married and has a son, Sajjad. Bari Sahab has two sons, Jahanzaib Chaudhry and Shahzeb. Bari Sahab was also the eldest sibling and her only sister died when her daughter Zainab was young. Zainab later used to live in Bari Sahab's home. She loved Jahanzaib more than anything. But Jahanzaib was married to Meena, whom Zainab hated, and because she cursed Meena to die, Meena died after giving birth to a daughter, Mannat. Mannat and Sajjad were initially married, but are at the end of their marriage. Mannat and Shahmir are secretly in love and want to marry, but because of Shahmir's evil plans that she was forced to marry Sajjad makes Mannat to hate Shahmir but he often visits Sain Sarkar's Mazar with Mannat. Mannat's sorrows began from her real mom Meena's death. Jahanzeb tells Zainab to take care of Mannat, and she does. Sajjad later divorces Mannat on Bari Sahab's wish as she did not want Mannat to marry Sajjad. Shahzeb acts as if he loves Zainab, but he is actually in love with Alisha. Mannat and Shahmir run away from home to save Mannat's unborn child. Zainab assists them in running away. When the morning comes, people in the haveli find out that Mannat and Shahmir ran away, and Jahanzaib sends people to find them. Mannat and Shahmir seek shelter in the city in Alisha’s house. Alisha calls the media to raise awareness of what happened to Mannat and to help other girls who may be going through a similar situation. Through the news, they found out that Zainab helped them run away. Due to this shock, Bari Sahab faints and is in a coma. Shahzeb is on his way to Alisha’s house to collect Mannat, however he gets shot and killed by one of Sikander’s men. In the end, Mannat gives birth to a baby boy. Alisha starts a school in which 300 students attend. The drama ends with Jahanzaib playing with his grandson; swinging the baby in the air.

== Cast ==
=== Main ===
- Zarnish Khan as Zainab
- Iqra Aziz as Mannat Chaudhry
- Kamran Jilani as Chaudhry Jahanzaib

=== Supporting ===
- Asma Abbas as Bari Sahab
- Nayyar Ejaz as Sikandar
- Saleem Sheikh as Dilawar Sikandar
- Hafiz Mohsin Ali as Shahmir
- Shamayal Tareen as Meena (Dead)
- Sabeeka Imam as Alisha
- Mirza Zain Baig as Shahzeb
- Haajraa
- Imran Ahmad as Sajjad (Dead)
- Muhammad Ashraf Rahi as Sikandar's servant & helper

== Original soundtrack ==
Laaj (OST)

Soundtrack album by Faiza Mujahid
- Released: July 10, 2016
- Recorded: 2016
- Studio: Moomal Productions
- Genre: television soundtrack
- Length: 4:03
- Label: MD Productions
- Producers: Fahim Burney, Momina Duraid

The soundtrack of Laaj was produced in the label of MD Productions and written by Edison Idrees Masih, fiction writer. Its lyrics are written by Sabir Zafar, lyricist.

== Production ==
In an interview (of the cast of Laaj on 22 July 2016) conducted by Sanam Jung, host of the morning show Jago Pakistan Jago, the director, Fahim Burney said that the project was first introduced 8 years ago but due to facilities not being available, the project was delayed. The drama serial deals with various themes, such as honour killing, importance of education for women and early (forced) marriage. Kamran Jeelani in the interview revealed that the experience shooting for Laaj was fun as there was a good director and cast, however the shoot was tough due to Ramazan and weather of Lahore and the cast had to wear heavy clothing as per requirements of the script. The travelling also made the shoot tough as the cast had to travel from Lahore to Muridke and back, daily, which would take 2–3 hours.

== See also ==
- List of programs broadcast by Hum TV
- 2016 in Pakistani television
