= Sehra Main Safar =

Pakistani television serial

- Title screen of the show
- Genre: Drama; Romance
- Based on: Sehra Main Safar by Sarwat Nazir
- Written by: Sarwat Nazir
- Screenplay by: Zakir Ahmad
- Directed by: Azfar Ali
- Creative director: Shujat Hussain
- Starring: Zarnish Khan; Ali Kazmi; Emmad Irfani; Anoushey Ashraf
- Opening theme: "Kar Thori Meherbaniyaan" by Shuja Haider; Faiza Mujahid
- Country of origin: Pakistan
- Original language: Urdu
- No. of seasons: 1
- No. of episodes: 23

Production
- Producers: Momina Duraid and Satish Anand
- Cinematography: Nadeem Kashmiri
- Editor: Hasan Ilyas (Cammy)
- Camera setup: Multi-camera setup
- Running time: 30-45 minutes

Original release
- Network: Hum TV, Hum Network Limited
- Release: 18 December 2015 – 27 May 2016

Related
- Tumhari Natasha; Dharkan

Sehra Main Safar (Urdu: صحرا میں سفر, lit. 'Journey Through the Desert') is a Pakistani romantic drama serial premiered on Hum TV on 18 December 2015. It is produced by Momina Duraid under MD Productions and written by Sarwat Nazir.

== Synopsis ==
=== Episode 1 ===
Sehra Main Safar is the story of a girl, Iqra (Zarnish Khan), who likes being in a house and doing household chores. She has never thought of doing a job and never wants to. Her father, Farooq, is a very genius man, and when he retires, the indication is that the responsibility of maintaining the house will land on Iqra. Her father is the uncle of Ayaz (Ali Kazmi), who likes Iqra. Watch the cute story of Iqra and Ayaz unfold.

=== Episode 2 ===
Ayaz tells his mother of his love for Iqra and his desire to marry her. His mother approves. On the other side, Shagufta comes to Iqra's home seeking her brother's marriage to Iqra. Iqra first says negative. Ayaz calls Iqra after his mother tells him about Iqra's impending wedding to her neighbour. Iqra says that she would follow her parents' wish for her future. Fauzia comes to Iqra's home and asks for Iqra's hand in marriage for Ayaz. Her father first refuses this proposal but then accepts. Her father makes money online and puts his money in the bank. Thieves steal the money which results in Farooq's heart attack and thus they go to hospital.

=== Episode 3 ===
Ayaz helps Farooq in the hospital. Farooq recovers but still has a stroke. Farooq needs someone to push his leg or arm because he has previously suffered a heart attack. Aliya does this. Farooq expresses the wish that Iqra must be married to his nephew Ayaz. Aliya tells this to Iqra, and she agrees because it's her parents' wish. Fouzia also tells Ayaz about his marriage to Iqra, but he refuses as she has already received a proposal from Shagufta's brother.

=== Episode 4 ===
The episode starts with Fauzia expressing the wish to visit Iqra's home and Iqra making chicken and potatoes. Aliya denies her that it will be fast food for her (Iqra)'s paternal aunt. Fauzia calls Farooq, who is already surviving a stroke, and tells him that Iqra must get a job in order to marry Ayaz. Farooq weeps but accepts. Aliya says about who called him? He says that Fauzia and expresses his wish that Iqra must do a job in order to marry Ayaz. Aliya asks, What will she do? He says that his daughter will do much to achieve success. Aliya goes to Farooq, who has not slept yet. Iqra comes and says that she will do much to achieve success. Farooq says that he knows that she will do much. Ayaz eats dinner with his mother. Her mother says to him that his refusal amused her. He said that she wants to marry a rich man, and he is not a rich man. Shagufta calls Aliya instead of Iqra. Aliya tells Iqra that she wants Iqra to be in her home. Iqra goes to Shagufta's home, and Shagufta lies on the bed. Iqra asks about her condition, and she says she is fine. Iqra tells her about her job and says that she will not marry for a while. Aasma annoys her mother that she wants 2,000 rupees for her farewell party. She says that she must refuse because of her father's condition. Iqra tells her that it is not good as her father is ill. She says that she is lucky as she is only at the home and never goes anywhere. Iqra gives her 600 rupees, but she refuses and says this is very short money and it's better to not go anywhere. At night, Iqra tells Aasma that she will do much to achieve success. Aasma says that she will give tuition to others in order to become rich. Iqra says it's a great plan. She goes office tomorrow after greeting her father.

=== Episode 5 ===
The episode starts with Iqra, who is in the office and meets Sonia. Iqra forgot to take lunch with her and eats Sonia's lunch with her permission. Aliya says that without Iqra, this home is silent, and she also forgot to make and eat lunch because she thought that Iqra was there because she always made lunch for all. Iqra comes home, greets all, and says that today was successful. The next day, Aliya gives her lunch, and she goes in a van. A man touches her, but she tries to give distance to him. He goes away. She goes to the office. This time a man says that this is not a rule of doing office work. Iqra becomes sad for a long time. Sonia tries to console her but she can't. There she meets with Asif and his girlfriend. Asif always greets Iqra on a new day. When she returns, there she waits for the van, but it doesn't come. The same man comes to take her, but she refuses. Ayaz comes and takes her to her home. Ayaz talks to Iqra about her marriage, but she says that she has a job and she will work, and she will not marry until her father recovers. She goes home. Aliya asks about why she is late; she says that Ayaz is gone today to take off her.

=== Episode 6 ===
The episode starts with Aliya saying to Iqra that why she had come with Ayaz on a bike. Iqra told her mother to forgive her; Aliya accepted. Ayaz comes home bit his mother, ignored to talk with him. He told her to forgive him as she is angry at his thing, which he told her in the morning. Fouzia forgiven. Aliya comes and tells Farooq all things Iqra has done. Farooq says that Iqra is a mature girl, and she will understand. Aasma comes and says that "Why are you feeling irritated"? She says to Iqra. And she replies that Ayaz today dropped you? Iqra said yes; she said that's good. Iqra told her that she (Iqra) is tired and will iron her clothes. Nabeel said to Iqra that's why she didn't give time to him and to Ayaz. Nabeel says that this cousin's relationship is so good that whenever she makes others her cousin. Shazia says that "why are you taking this thing on your heart? There work is to talk to women". Sir called Iqra and said that "Nabeel doesn't do good things; that's why I ignore him". And says that "She (Iqra) is a very good worker and says that she works a little hard." Iqra becomes happy. Iqra waits for Bus. Ayaz comes and says that he dropped her off at home. Iqra ignored him and said that she would not go with him. Ayaz asks the reason, she says that Bus has come; she will go. Ayaz said to Fouzia that he wants to marry Iqra. Fouzia says "Are you mad? You denied to marry, and now you accepted". Fouzia says, that you don't do fasting, i will do. Show took a 1-month leap. Shazia tells Iqra to go with her to do shopping. She bought many things and clothes. Aliya opens the door and says, where were you? Iqra says that's why you start asking things. Iqra goes to her father and says that she has bought many things. Aliya says that why has she done this? She bought a jacket for her father. She gives 27,000 to her mother as her salary. Aliya says that she will use this money well. Iqra says to Farooq that Do you do exercise?. Farooq says that yes. Aasma comes and says that what she bought for her (Aasma). She says nothing, but she will give 500 rupees. Aliya says that's why she gone to shopping. She says that it was Shazia's wish. Aliya says that why she gave Aasma 500 rupees. Aasma, in a laughy voice, snatched that. Aliya calculates the bill and says to Farooq that Iqra did not spend money because of how food and other things were done. Aliya and Farooq say that Iqra is a good girl. Asif says to sir that payment has been done. Sir calls Iqra and says to her that she is a good worker and she can be a good woman. Sir says that payment has been increased by 5000 of your monthly salary. Shazia says that why she uses her money at home, she says it will be good for her parents. Fouzia goes to Farooq's home. Aliya comes in the room and says him that she will use this money on the right things. Farooq says that medicines also. She says that she will Iqra prepares for coqllege. Aliya says Iqra has many things to buy. Iqra comes with Shazia and tells her to buy shoes. She ignored to buy. She buys. Fouzia comes to Farooq's home and says that she has come to marry Ayaz to Iqra. He ignores. She says that not fastly we will marry but many years later. Farooq accepts, but Aliya upsets. Farooq says that it is my order that now Iqra will now only marry with Ayaz. Iqra calls Aliya and says that she has bought, as you said, as well as her shoe. She said that it is more old and becomes angry. Iqra also becomes angry.

=== Episode 7 ===
The episode starts with Iqra thinking of works that she has done before the office (i.e. greeting Farooq; Farooq says that Iqra will do anything). Aasma calls her and says she should to give her dress. Iqra says Aasma to go out for 1 minute. Aasma comes to Aliya, says her that her aapi has done bad deeds with her. Aliya and says to she comes from the office tha's why she has tension, so you don't say me. Iqra sleeps. Aliya comes and kisses her and puts a blanket on her. Farooq says what happened? Aliya said, "I think Iqra has tension today;she has done bad deeds." And says that "She has bought Shoes; that's why i told her that this is not good." Farooq says, "She is an office worker, she will bid anything of her choice; you don't say her anything." Fouzia maintains hairs. Ayaz comes and says, Are you fine? He gives her water. Fouzia says that Iqra will accept this marriage, and Farooq and Aliya have also. You don't do anything. Aliya calls Iqra, but Iqra is at the office. She says that what will happen is she will be tired. Iqra comes and says Kazmi Iqra says to Shazia that the shoes that we bought yesterday were not liked by Aliya. Shazia says that is not problem and says that is why you said that you have a bonus of 5,000. Iqra says that her brain is bad. Shazia tell her to be ready for her bonus. Iqra says to her that it's good. Any other woman says to her that another man has a job instead of Nabeel. Iqra comes to office and greets the counter. Shehreyar comes and likes Iqra. After his coming, all girls see Shehreyar and say them handsome. Nida says peon, that what's his name. Peon said, "Shehreyar Ahmed". Sir called Shehreyar and said that he always does good work. He is the son of a factory manager and works for his own benefit. Nida says Kareem (Peon ) to ask him what they (Shehreyar and Sir) are talking about. He asked all things. She said to Iqra if she liked him but Iqra refused. Sir called Iqra and said him that she is a good worker and a bonus been has given to your account. Sir called Shehreyar, and told him that Iqra is a good worker, you also should be Iqra comes to the counter and says to him to have a bonus. Iqra became happy as she took. Iqra says that she will give this money to her guardians. Iqra says that she will don't tell a lie she will give this to her guardian. Shazia says that there is also your right to spend in various conditions. Iqra refused. Iqra comes to home, gives 42,000 to Aliya and says she to renovate home. Farooq said that she must save for herself. Iqra refused to do. Aasma had to buy 2 suits. Aliya refused but Aliya accepted. Iqra works in computer. Shehreyar says Iqra that if she can e-mail. Iqra refused. Shehreyar says that he has listened that Iqra will do. Iqra finally accepted. Nida says Iqra and says what Shehreyar said. She said it was work of e-mail. Nida said Shehreyar and gave him e-mail attachment and said to always say her to give attachment. Iqra comes home and says that why she broke up some cups. She said why is it happening and she said that she will not take tea and said that to broke up remaining cups. Aliya says Farooq that Iqra was a good woman and now she had said that don't waste money on unuseful works. Iqra called Aliya and said that she is shameful for her deed. She said that if she will not forgive, she will not be able to sleep. Aasma wakes up and Shagufta comes and says that she had come after long days. She says that she had come today to take proposal of Aasma because her brother don't like office women.

=== Episode 9 ===
The episode starts with Shazia telling Iqra that Shehreyar is interested in her, and she should be a little nicer to him. After work it starts raining heavily while Iqra waits for the bus. Shehreyar asks Iqra to let him drive her home. Iqra hesitates, but Shehreyar insists. In the car, Shehreyar says to Iqra "You look good when you smile, " to which she responds "In our society when a girl smiles, people take the wrong impression, therefore it is better not to smile. I think we should go home now, the rain has also settled down a bit." At home, Aliya asks why Iqra came so late. When Iqra tells her, Aliya is furious, and asks her when she forbid her to come home with Ayaz on his bike, why she thought it was appropriate to come home with her male colleague. Iqra becomes angry at this and says some harsh words to her mother. Fouzia come and said Ayaz said Iqra how is she? she said fine. Ayaz said you are looking sad. Are you not happy with Aasma's marriage. She said no. Ayaz talked, Iqra said Had you any work, if you have to meet Aasma, she is outside. Ayaz gone outside but with seeing Iqra. Ayaz brought tea for Fouzia. Ayaz said how is tea? she said fine like every day. Ayaz asked Had you meet Iqra? she said no. He said i meet. He added that "She was looking sad and this is not good that Aasma married instead of Iqra". Fouzia said that she also said this to Farooq but he said that this depended on the condition. Aasma wake up and was making up hairs. Iqra came, she said you are looking good. Iqra said that she is going tell this to Aliya. Aliya came and said where is Iqra? she said that she has gone. Iqra was waiting for bus. Shehreyar came and said her that to come in his car. They talked. Shehreyar and Iqra reached at office. Nida saw her and said to Shazia that when she got rich man, she talked and done many things for her. Farooq called Aliya and said that he has got money of the month! and given the money to Aliya. He also said that Iqra helped them in the difficulty. Aliya said that with being mother, i didn't explain my daughter because she does what she wants. Iqra was happy and given reports. Shazia said that Nida said that you came with Shehreyar today. Iqra said that today bus didn't come that's why i do so. Asma's marriage was taking place. Ayaz said her that whom is she waiting? Ayaz talked with Iqra. Iqra stopped the conversation to go with Shehreyar. Ayaz also seen her and gone and also seeing. Shehreyar and Iqra were talking. Iqra decided to meet Shehreyar with Farooq. Fouzia also saw her in angry face. Fouzia and Ayaz were also talking about Shehreyar as this is 1st time done in their family that Iqra has made friendship with man whom she don't know. She says that she will take Marriage date from Farooq. Iqra goes in office this time again with Shehreyar. Akbar also saw them talking each other. Iqra visited to Akbar's staff room for main work. There was another man whom she given assignment. The other man thought that Iqra is not like that. Iqra also listened what they said. Iqra was thinking of a better solution. Nida and Shazia gone to room with the permission of Iqra. Shehreyar said Iqra to take off him but she refused as all are making fun of this thing as love. Shehreyar said that what happened, i can't see you in condition. Iqra lied that she has headache. Shehreyar said if you will not go, i will also not. Iqra said to go with Shehreyar for lunch to Shehreyar. Asma said that All my in-laws care of me to Aliya. She said that she misses her to Aliya. Aliya said that she is not as she was before. They talked more. Iqra came home, she saw a car, she said whose car is this, he said it is of Aasma. She came home, greeted all. Aasma said that "i miss you more than others" Iqra became jealous and said that why do you marry him? you should be with us? she said it was as Farooq said. She said them to go out she has to sleep but was she still angry.⋅···

== Cast ==
- Zarnish Khan as Iqra
- Ali Kazmi as Ayaz
- Emmad Irfani as Sheheryar
- Anoushey Ashraf as Annie
- Lubna Aslam as Fouzia
- Shehryar Zaidi as Farooq
- Humaira Zaheer as Aliya
- Aiman Khan as Anaya
- Erum Azam as Asma
- Esha Noor as Ayesha
- Afraz Rasool as Maamul
- Wajid Kazi
- Hania Naqvi
- Shaman Bashir

== Reception ==
The drama series became popular soon after it went on-air. It made Hum TV the slot leader on Fridays at the 9pm slot. Just in its first episode, in the U.K., Sehra Main Safar drew in 49,400 viewers at 9pm. This rating further increased and Sehra Main Safar was most watched on Hum Europe in the U.K. as its second episode had a rating of 62,900 viewers. Rising even more, the third episode of Sehra Main Safar in the U.K. registered 69,300 viewers on New Year's Day. The drama was most watched on Hum Europe again on both 8 January 2016 and 15 January 2016. On its 4th episode (8 Jan), SMS attracted 55,500 viewers but on its 5th episode (15 Jan), in the U.K., Sehra Main Safar topped the ratings with its highest score of 78,700 viewers. The repeat of the 5th episode which aired on 22 Jan in UK, also pulled in 78,100 viewers. The twelfth episode aired on 11 March 2016, in U.K., and garnered the most ratings for the show and the channel on the night with 98,800 viewers. In Pakistan it also received much positive feedback. Its 7th episode gained 3.0 TRPs, the 11th episode had 3.2 TRPs and the 15th had 2.5 TRPs.

== Original soundtrack ==
Sehra Main Safar Ost

Soundtrack album by Shuja Haider
- Released: 6 December 2015
- Recorded: 2015
- Genre: Television soundtrack
- Length: 3:50
- Label: MD Productions
- Producer: Momina Duraid

The song of Sehra Main Safar is its original soundtrack. It is produced by Momina Duraid in label of MD Productions and written by Sarwat Nazir, a fiction writer.
