= Lucknow Wale Lateefullah =

- Genre: Comedy; Family; Romance
- Written by: Syed Zain Raza
- Screenplay by: Syed Zain Raza
- Directed by: Mohammad Iftikhar Iffi
- Starring: Hassan Ahmed; Sonya Hussain
- Country of origin: Pakistan
- Original language: Urdu

Production
- Producer: Inaam Ilahi
- Cinematography: Kashif Jabbar
- Production company: Three Lines Entertainment

Original release
- Network: Hum TV
- Release: 10 October 2015

Lucknow Wale Lateefullah is a 2015 Pakistani drama television film directed by Mohammad Iftikhar Iffi, written by Syed Zain Raza, and produced by Inaam Shah. The telefilm stars Hassan Ahmad, Sonya Hussain, Aiman Khan, Ismat Zaidi and Shamim Hilaly in pivotal roles. The telefilm premiered on 10 October 2015 by Hum TV.

== Plot ==
Lateefullah has come from Lucknow to get married in Pakistan. The bride-to-be Maira expects him to look like a Bollywood hero. Lateef, on the other hand, expects her to be traditional and conservative. However, both turn out to be completely different from each other's expectations.

== Cast ==
- Hassan Ahmed as Lateefullah
- Sonya Hussain as Maira Ahmed
- Aiman Khan as Aaliya Ahmed
- Manzoor Qureshi as Hamid Ahmed (Maira and Aaliya' father)
- Ismat Zaidi as Amna Hamid (Maira's mother)
- Saleem Mairaj as Inspector
- Shamim Hilaly as Zulaiqa (Lateefullah's mother)

== Nominations ==
- Nominated for Best Television Film at 4th Hum Awards.
