= Zarnish Khan =

Pakistani actress

- زرنش خان
- Born: 16 August 1993 (age 32)
- Occupation: Actress
- Years active: 2013–2023

Zarnish Khan is a Pakistani former television actress known for her appearance in Urdu television serials. Khan has played the role of Alizeh in Susraal Mera (2015) for which she received Hum Award for Best Soap Actress. Later she played the role of Samra in Aye Zindagi (2015) and Iqra in Sehra Main Safar (2015). The former role earned her nomination for Best Supporting Actress at Hum Awards. She further appeared in leading roles in acclaimed serials Laaj (2016), Sun Yaara, Man Chahi (2017), De Ijazat (2018) and Ek Mohabbat Kaafi Hai (2018–19).

== Television ==
| Year | Title | Role | Notes |
|---|---|---|---|
| 2013 | Anjanay Nagar | Wafa's sister | |
| 2014 | Muhabbat Ab Nahi Hugi | Maliha | |
| 2014 | Dhol Bajnay Laga | Iqra | |
| 2014–2015 | Susraal Mera | Alizeh | Hum Award for Best Soap Actress |
| 2014 | Khuda Na Karay | Aabi | |
| 2015 | Aye Zindagi | Samra | |
| 2015–2016 | Sehra Main Safar | Iqra | |
| 2016 | Laaj | Zainab | |
| 2016 | Khoobsurat | Meher | |
| 2016–2017 | Manchahi | Momina | |
| 2017 | Sun Yaara | Lalarukh (Laali) | |
| 2017 | Is Chand Pe Dagh Nahin | Mahnuma | |
| 2018 | De Ijazat | Dua | |
| 2018 | Ustani Jee | Zara | Episode 7 |
| 2018–2019 | Aik Mohabbat Kaafi Hai | Ushna | |
| 2019-2020 | Ishq Zahe Naseeb | Donia | |
| 2019 | Jo Tu Chahay | Bisma | |
| 2019 | Mohabbat Na Kariyo | Rabeea | |
| 2019 | Yeh Dil Mera | Humaira, Amaanullah's Mother | |
| 2022 | Aitebaar | Parisa “Pari” | |
| 2022 | Yeh Ishq Samajh Na Aaye | Rida | |

=== Telefilm ===
| Year | Telefilm | Role | Network |
|---|---|---|---|
| 2015 | Ek Our Ek Gyaraah | Mira | Hum TV |
| 2016 | Janey Sey Pehlay | Ramsha | Aaj Entertainment |
| 2016 | Dil Mein Baji Ghanti | Innaya | Hum TV |
| 2017 | Yeh Ishq Nahi Asaan | Mishi | Urdu 1 |

== Awards and nominations ==
| Year | Work | Award | Result | Ref |
Hum Award
| 2015 | Susraal Mera. | Hum Award for Best Soap Actress | Won | |
| 2016 | Aye Zindagi | Hum Award for Best Supporting Actress | Nominated | |
