= Khaali Haath =

2017 Pakistani television series

- The opening title screen
- خالی ہاتھ
- Genre: Romance, Melodrama
- Written by: Seema Munaf
- Directed by: Wajahat Hussain
- Starring: Aiman Khan; Ali Abbas; Shahzad Sheikh; Kiran Haq
- Composer: Sahir Ali Bagga
- Country of origin: Pakistan
- Original language: Urdu
- No. of seasons: 1
- No. of episodes: 26

Production
- Producers: Abdullah Kadwani & Asad Qureshi
- Production location: Pakistan
- Running time: 40 minutes (Each Episode)

Original release
- Network: Geo Entertainment
- Release: 6 February – 14 August 2017

Khaali Haath (Urdu: خالی ہاتھ, lit. 'Empty-Handed') is a Pakistani television series aired on Geo Entertainment on 6 February 2017. It is produced by Abdullah Kadwani and Asad Qureshi under 7th Sky Entertainment. It stars Aiman Khan, Ali Abbas, Shahzad Sheikh and Kiran Haq in leads.

== Plot ==
Khaali Haath revolves around Mashal a.k.a. Mishi (Aiman Khan), who is a gifted, beautiful, sensible and high-spirited girl. Her elder sister, Sobia (Kiran Haq) receives a marriage proposal from Basil's (Ali Abbas) family. Mashal was out of town at the moments of commitment session. Basil sees his sister-in-law, Mashal, for the first time on the occasion of the engagement ceremony and instantly falls in love with her. He becomes obsessed with Mashal and develops an ultimate desire to attain her at any cost. Despite being her brother-in-law, he drops hints that he is interested in her. Mashal finds herself in a miserable situation due to frequent harassment from Basil. Mashal soon receives a marriage proposal from Haisam (Shahzad Sheikh) and they get married. Basil starts plotting diabolic schemes against this union. He misguides Mashal by showing her uneven closeness between Haisam and Mashal's younger sister Umaima (Faria Sheikh). And she thinks that Haisam is also trying to trap her sister just like Basil did with her. She starts talking rudely with her husband. Basil set a trap for Mashal's younger sister, he employed a man in Haisams office because Umaima had start working with Haisam in his office. The man tries to flirt with her and he succeeds. Umaima realizes that he loves her but Haisam warns Umaima that he is not good for her but she refuses to listen. The man take her to his home and decided to do Nikah right now. But Umaima refuses so he blackmails her. When their Nikah is going to happen, Haisam arrives instantaneously with police and they arrest the boys. Umaima apologies to Haisam and he takes her to his house. When Mashal sees them together, she wrongly blames Haisam and says that he kidnapped her and further. Everyone was shocked and heart broken Haisam slaps her in anger and goes to his room. Umaima told her all the story and she realizes her mistakes. On the other hand, Sobia hears Basil conversation about fake marriage certificate she confronts him due to which he slaps her and in anger he tell the truth that he love Mashal and wanted to marry her not Sobia. He locks Sobia in the room and later apologies to her but she shocks him by saying that if your daughter look likes Mashal then what will you do? Mashal apologies to Haisam and feels guilty and Haisam forgives her so the family becomes happy but when Sobia comes to their house crying everyone was worried she tells the truth to her mother and that Mashal listens and says her sister not to keep quiet. She tells everything to her husband about Basil's harassment. Haisam angrily leaves the house and Mashal calls Basil says to leave the house as Haisam has known everything and that he is going to beat you but Basil kills himself with gun when Mashal last time rejected his offer of coming to him.

== Cast ==
- Aiman Khan as Mashal (Mishi)
- Ali Abbas as Basil
- Shahzad Sheikh as Haisam
- Kiran Haq as Sobia
- Rabia Noreen as Mashal, Sobia & Umaima's mother
- Nida Mumtaz as Farhat

== Reception ==
The serial is one of the popular series of 2017. Ali Abbas received positive response for his portrayal as an antagonist.

== Soundtrack ==
Kahan Jaye Yeh Dil – OST

Soundtrack album by Sahir Ali Bagga
- Released: 2017
- Recorded: 2017
- Genre: Television Soundtrack
- Length: 5:06
- Language: Urdu
- Label: Har Pal Geo

Music video
- "Kahan Jaye Yeh Dil" OST on YouTube

The title song was sung and composed by Sahir Ali Bagga and the lyrics were written by S.K. Khalish.
