= Chanar Ghati =

Pakistani television drama series

- Genre: Thriller; Supernatural fiction
- Written by: Syed Mohammad Ahmed; Umar Khitab
- Directed by: Syed Ghazanffar Ali
- Starring: Anoushey Ashraf; Dino Ali; Samiya Mumtaz; Shamayl Tareen; Tipu Shareef; Ali Noor
- Country of origin: Pakistan
- Original language: Urdu
- No. of episodes: 20

Original release
- Network: TV One Pakistan
- Release: 9 August – 20 December 2017

Chanar Ghati is a 2017 Pakistani drama serial, aired on TV One. Co-written by Syed Mohammad Ahmed and Umar Khitab, it stars Samiya Mumtaz, Shamyal Tareen, Tipu Shareef, Anoushey Ashraf, Dino Ali and Ali Noor in prominent roles. Chanar Ghati is a haunting story of intense love, betrayal and revenge. Set in the present era and at the time of British Raj, it revolves around the ghosts of two sisters who seek justice and want to take revenge. It marks the acting debuts of musician Ali Noor and VJ Dino Ali.

== Synopsis ==
While working together in an advertising agency, Maira and Sajid start falling for each other. One day, Sajid disappears while researching about and in a place called "Chanar Ghati". While everyone looks for Sajid, he encounters strange experiences there. He meets Jahan Ara and Geati Ara who fulfill his every single need. Remaining disconnected from the outside world, he feels that something sinister is happening with him. On the other hand, in Sajid and Maira's agency their colleague Junaid who wants to marry Maira, decides to recover him.

== Cast ==
- Samiya Mumtaz as Jahan Ara
- Shamyal Tareen as Geati Ara
- Tipu Shareef as Sajid
- Anoushey Ashraf as Maira
- Dino Ali as Junaid
- Ali Noor as Ali Rao
- Alyy Khan as Jalal Rao
