= Parsa (TV series) =

- Opening title
- Directed by: Siraj-ul-Haque
- Starring: Ayesha Khan; Ahsan Khan; Adnan Siddiqui; Anita Fatima Camphor; Tahira Wasti; Ismat Zaidi; Khayyam Sarhadi
- Theme music composer: Sohail Haider
- Opening theme: "Zindagi Tere Naam Ki", performed by Rajab Ali
- Country of origin: Pakistan
- Original language: Urdu
- No. of episodes: 23

Production
- Producer: Momina Duraid
- Running time: 39 - 40 min (per episode)

Original release
- Network: Hum TV
- Release: 24 October 2010 – 27 March 2011

Parsa (Urdu: پارسا, lit. 'Pious') is a Pakistani drama serial based on the novel of the same name "Parsa", by Bushra Rahman with screenplay by Tahira Wasti. It explores the permissibility of inter-faith marriages, and cultural and societal issues regarding the topic. The drama depicts the story of Parsa, a Muslim girl who falls in love with David, a family friend and Christian.

== Plot ==
Parsa (Ayesha Khan), or Paari, is a Muslim girl whose parents Irfan and Waheeda are good friends with next-door neighborhood and old friends, Tina and Joseph and their son David, who are all devout Christians. Paari and David are good friends, and are often shown to be hanging out with each other. But then, Safia, Paari's aunt and Irfan's sister comes to meet them and asks Paari's hand for her son Salman. Safia loves Paari a lot. When she asks, Irfan is very happy about her sister's decision and agrees. Waheeda is also very happy. But then Paari is not happy because Salman, is quiet and shy, the complete opposite of loud and rambunctious Parsa. Paari doesn't have any interest in Salman although her friend Sonu praises for her luck. One time in David's house there is a New Year Party. Salman and Paari attend the party but Paari's house servant tells something to Salman and Salman leaves the party. David and Paari dance but then Paari runs because of David's way of dancing with her. When she is going towards the house, she sees an ambulance and her car following the ambulance. Waheeda is sitting in the car. She asks her mother what happened to which she replies that her aunt has got a heart attack. Waheeda, Salman and Irfan are shocked. Luckily Safia gets recovered and comes home. Waheeda is very happy. Unfortunately Safia dies and Salman and Irfan are shattered. Salman cries a lot. Waheeda is shocked for her sister-in-law's demise because she thought Safia as her sister. Tina consoles her but she is also sad. Paari goes in a complete shock. So her mother says to concentrate in her studies. She accepts Salman as the choice of her parents and realizes that Salman needs her after her mother's demise But things start to unravel when Parsa and David begin to fall in love. David confesses his love for her, and Parsa realizes that she too has feelings for him. Parsa at first refuses his proposal to her, using religion as an excuse, but David agrees to convert to Islam for her, and soon Parsa and the newly Muslim "Dawood" are married. Here begins the ultimate story, as Parsa and David struggle to gain forgiveness from their parents, and attempt to make a life for themselves despite their different religious backgrounds. Parsa and Dawood move to Europe. Here after a lot of struggle and hardwork, they get their own apartment. Parsa falls pregnant and soon gives birth to a baby girl whom she calls Momi and David calls Mary. The show takes an 18-year leap. Momi is all grown up now and Parsa is a well known and famous doctor. Dawood and Parsa's relationship is very poor and he has a girlfriend Rosylin who he hangs out with. Parsa is soon diagnosed with cancer and doesn't disclose it to anyone. Parsa's daughter Momi is going to Pakistan for her thesis on poor countries. After she leaves for Pakistan, Parsa's health starts to worsen and soon David realizes his mistakes and moves back in with Parsa. During her time in Pakistan, Momi tells Salman to propose Sobia but then Sobia rejects him and cries a lot. Then Momi falls in love with Salman (Parsa's ex-fiancée). Momi and Salman are married and whilst in hospital breathing her last Parsa begs David to divorce her. She then dies a peaceful death and David accepts Islam wholeheartedly. Momi and Salman build a Parsa Memorial Hospital in Parsa's memory.

== Cast ==
- Ayesha Khan as Pari
- Ahsan Khan as David
- Adnan Siddiqui as Salman
- Nida Khan as Maryam/Mary
- Shehroz Sabzwari as Shahrukh
- Zhalay Sarhadi as Sobia
- Sana Askari as Sonu, Pari's friend
- Farah Shah as Sadaf, Pari's sister
- Humaira Zaheer as Waheeda, Pari's mother and Tina's friend
- Anita Fatima Camphor as Tina, David's mother and Waheeda's friend
- Khayyam Sarhadi as Irfan, Parsa's father. Is shattered after her sisters' death
- Raju Jamil as Joseph, David's father
- Nimra Bucha as Soni
- Ismat Zaidi as Safia, Irfan's only sister, Salman's mother and Pari's aunt
- Ayesha Khan as Shabana
- Tahira Wasti
- Khalid Anam as Gopal
- Shama Askari as Koko
