= Khaas =

2019 Pakistani television series

- Written by: Sarwat Nazir
- Directed by: Danish Nawaz
- Starring: Ali Rehman Khan; Sanam Baloch; Haroon Shahid; Hira Tareen
- Theme music composer: Sohail Haider
- Opening theme: "Woh Jo Tha Bahut Hi Khaas" by Natasha Baig
- Ending theme: "Woh Jo Tha Bahut Hi Khaas" by Haroon Shahid
- Country of origin: Pakistan
- Original language: Urdu
- No. of seasons: 1
- No. of episodes: 27

Production
- Producer: Momina Duraid
- Camera setup: Multi-camera setup
- Production company: MD Productions

Original release
- Network: Hum TV
- Release: 17 April – 23 October 2019

Related
- Tajdeed e Wafa; Yeh Dil Mera

Khaas (Urdu: خاص, lit. 'Special)' is a 2019 Pakistani television series, produced by Momina Duraid under their banner MD Productions and directed by Danish Nawaz. It stars Sanam Baloch and Ali Rehman Khan in leading roles with a supporting cast of Haroon Shahid, Hira Tareen, Behroze Sabzwari, Lubna Aslam, Sajida Syed, Saba Faisal, Natasha Ali and Anam Goher. Baloch has made her acting comeback after her last appearance in Teri Raza (2017).

== Plot ==
The plot revolves around Saba Faraz (Sanam Baloch), an ambitious and confident girl and Ammar Saud (Ali Rehman Khan), a charming and handsome businessman who is actually a narcissist. After Ammar's family sends a marriage proposal for Saba, she is reluctant to get married as she wants to focus on her career after completing her post-graduate studies. However, Ammar adamantly pursues Saba and gets her approval. In the process, Saba falls for Ammar's false charms. It is only after they get married that Ammar's true colours begin to show. He disrespects her and insults her. When she gets a job offer from Ammar's office, he gets jealous of her career and disapproves on her decision of taking the job in the worst way possible. Further in the show it shows Saba's struggle in getting out of the toxic marriage and moving on. After her parents even go against her and are all trapped in Ammar's false charm, she finally marries the man who respects her, Fakhir (Haroon Shahid), but destiny isn't with Saba.

== Cast ==
- Sanam Baloch as Saba Faraz
- Ali Rehman Khan as Ammar Saud; Saba's first husband
- Haroon Shahid as Fakhir; Ammar's friend; Saba's second husband
- Behroze Sabzwari as Faraz Ahmed; Saba's father
- Lubna Aslam as Sadaf Faraz; Saba's mother
- Saba Faisal as Kanwal Saud; Ammar's mother
- Mashal Khan as Sonia; Ammar and Nida's cousin
- Anam Goher as Nida Saud; Ammar's younger sister
- Sajida Syed as Nusrat
- Natasha Ali as Farah; Ammar's cousin
- Momal Sheikh
- Amna Malik as Javeria; Ammar and Fakhir's friend, later Saba's friend
- Sajjad Paul as Asim; Javeria's husband
- Shehryar Zaidi as Saud; Ammar's father
- Sonia Nazir as Anam
- Shazia Qaiser as Ammar's aunt
- Areesha Shah as Mehak Faraz; Saba's younger sister
- Sanam Baloch as Fakhir's late mother (only seen in flashbacks)
- Danish Nawaz as Fakhir's late father (only seen in flashbacks)
- Hira Tareen as Salma; Ammar's second wife

== Soundtrack ==
The official soundtrack of the series is sung by Natasha Baig on the lyrics of Mohammad Akmal and music composition is done by Sohail Haider.

== Reception ==
The serial received critical acclaim due to its subject, storyline and performances of the cast, especially of Baloch and Khan. Sadaf Haider of Dawn Images lauded the script and wrote, "Emotional abuse is a slippery subject but TV drama Khaas gets it right so far." Baloch's performance and character received praise from critics with Dawn Images lauded her performance stating, "Sanam Baloch is back in great form as Saba; her performances are rarely anything other than excellent and this is no exception". Critics also praised the performance of Ali Rehman Khan, Hira Tareen and Haroon Shahid. A reviewer from Daily Times said, "One of the most relatable drama serials" due to its common subject and relatable storyline. Despite positive reviews and critical praise throughout its run, the series received mixed reviews for its "forceful" end.

== Accolades ==
Date of ceremony	Award	Category	Recipient(s) and nominee(s)	Result	Ref.
7 February 2020	Pakistan International Screen Awards	Best TV Actress	Sanam Baloch	Nominated	
7 February 2020	Pakistan International Screen Awards	Best TV Actress - Critic's choice	Sanam Baloch	Nominated	
7 February 2020	Pakistan International Screen Awards	Best TV Writer	Sarwat Nazir	Nominated	
31 December 2020	Lux Style Awards	Best TV Writer	Sarwat Nazir	Nominated	
31 December 2020	Lux Style Awards	Best Original Soundtrack	Natasha Baig	Nominated	
