= Rah-e-Junoon =

2023 Pakistani television series

- Genre: Drama; Romance
- Written by: Rehana Aftab
- Directed by: Syed Ahmed Kamran
- Starring: Danish Taimoor; Komal Meer
- Country of origin: Pakistan
- Original language: Urdu
- No. of episodes: 28

Production
- Producers: Momina Duraid; Moomal Shunaid
- Production locations: Karachi, Pakistan
- Camera setup: Multi-camera setup
- Running time: 40 minutes
- Production companies: Moomal Productions; MD Productions

Original release
- Network: Hum TV
- Release: November 9, 2023 – June 29, 2024

Rah-e-Junoon is a 2023 Pakistani romantic television drama series that premiered on Hum TV on 9 November 2023. It stars Danish Taimoor and Komal Meer in leads along with Zain Afzal, Hiba Ali Khan, Saba Faisal, Mehmood Aslam and Ali Tahir in supporting roles.

== Plot ==
Shabrez is a young man from a wealthy family, but his life is far from happy. He struggles with personal problems and feels neglected by his parents. After receiving treatment for his addiction, he finds himself at a very low point in life. During a trip to the mountains, he meets Meher, a university student who unexpectedly changes his outlook on life. Her kindness gives him hope, and he soon develops strong feelings for her. When they return to Karachi, Shabrez decides to continue his education and enrolls at Meher's university. Their relationship grows, but his feelings become increasingly intense. He wants to protect Meher and keep her close, yet his possessiveness and anger begin to create problems. Meher, meanwhile, has her own family struggles. Her younger sister, Zara, is jealous of the attention Meher receives from their father. Shabrez's family also has its share of conflicts, particularly because of the emotional distance between him and his parents. As the story progresses, Shabrez's determination to be with Meher leads to difficult situations. Their relationship is tested by family interference, misunderstandings, jealousy, and his inability to control his emotions.

== Cast ==
- Danish Taimoor as Shabrez
- Komal Meer as Meher
- Ali Tahir as Shabrez'a father
- Saba Faisal as Shabrez's mother
- Mehmood Aslam as Meher's father
- Sabahat Adil as Meher's mother
- Hurriya Mansoor as Zara; Meher's sister
- Hiba Ali Khan as Natasha
- Zain Afzal as Zaid
- Agha Talal as Usman
- Farida Shabbir

== Reception ==
The series received mixed critical attention for its portrayal of romance and its central male character. In its television column The Tube, published on 19 November 2023, Dawn critic Sadaf Haider criticised the drama's shift from an emotionally engaging opening towards conventional melodrama.

According to ContentAsia, citing data from entertainment analytics company Parrot Analytics, Rah-e-Junoon was the only Pakistani television title included among the most in-demand programmes in Pakistan for the week of 29 January to 4 February 2024. It appeared alongside international productions including Game of Thrones, Money Heist and Kuruluş: Osman.

== Soundtrack ==
Mujhe Ishq Hua (Rah-e-Junoon Original Soundtrack)

Soundtrack album by Wajhi Farooki
- Released: 2 November 2023
- Genre: Television soundtrack
- Language: Urdu
- Label: Hum TV
External videos
- Official music video on YouTube
