= Aye Zindagi (TV series) =

2015 Pakistani Drama Serial

- Written by: Saira Arif
- Directed by: Adnan Wai Qureshi
- Country of origin: Pakistan
- Original language: Urdu

Production
- Executive producer: Momina Duraid
- Producer: Mehroz Karim
- Running time: 35-45 minutes

Original release
- Network: Hum TV
- Release: 12 March – 12 August 2015

Aye Zindagi is a 2015 Pakistani television serial, directed by Adnan Wai Qureshi, produced by Mehroz Karim, and aired on Hum TV. It first aired on 12 March 2015. The story focuses on the issues related to adoption and revolves around a family that adopts a boy from their relatives.

== Plot ==
The story revolves around the family of Hamid, who lives with his wife Saba, three daughters Samra, Nimra, and Vashma, and an adopted son, Taimoor. Saba loves Taimoor more than her daughters and prioritises him. This unjust behaviour bothers Nimra, she protests against it to her mother, but she pays no heed to it.

== Cast ==
- Affan Waheed as Taimoor
- Sidra Batool as Nimra
- Zarnish Khan as Samra
- Sakina Samo as Saba
- Manzoor Qureshi as Hamid
- Jinaan Hussain as Alina
- Hassan Ahmed as Ashar
- Hassan Niazi as Adeel
- Shamim Hilaly as Sultana
- Mazhar Ali as Jalal
- Khalid Ahmed
- Nida Mumtaz as Amma
- Mohsin Gillani
- Ali Abbas

== Soundtrack ==
The official soundtrack of the serial was performed by Quratulain Balouch. It marked her return to the channel since she performed the OST of Roshan Sitara in 2012. The music was composed by Waqar Ali, while all the lyrics were written by Asma Nabeel. The soundtrack along with the serial was co-produced by Moomal Shunaid and Mehroz Karim.

Track list
No.	Title	Singer(s)	Length
1.	"Aye Zindagi Aaj Rang Na Badalna"	Qurat-ul-Ain Balouch	3:08

== Awards and nominations ==
- Hum Awards - Zarnish Khan - Best Supporting Actor-Female - Nominated
