= Aitebaar =

2022 Pakistani drama series

- Written by: Maimoona Aziz
- Directed by: Nadeem Siddiqui
- Starring: Zarnish Khan; Syed Jibran; Ali Safina; Arez Ahmed
- Country of origin: Pakistan
- Original language: Urdu
- No. of episodes: 33

Production
- Producer: Momina Duraid
- Camera setup: Multi-camera setup
- Running time: 40-41 minutes approx.
- Production company: MD Productions

Original release
- Network: Hum TV
- Release: 24 January – 19 September 2022

Aitebaar (transl. Trust) is a Pakistani television drama series produced by Momina Duraid under banner MD Productions and first aired on Hum TV on 24 January 2022. It stars Zarnish Khan, Syed Jibran and Ali Safina in leading roles.

The series received negative comments from social media users for trivialising the victims of rape and received mixed reviews from critics.

The OST was sung by Atif Ali and Wardah Lodhi, with the former also composing the music.

== Plot summary ==
The series follows the daily life challenges faced by a girl, Parisa a.k.a. Pari, who is a doctor by profession. Her life turns upside down when her husband, Hamza, refuses to accept her when she escapes from a rape attempt on road.

== Cast ==
- Zarnish Khan as Parisa Ahmed "Pari"
- Syed Jibran as Hamza; Parisa's ex-husband, Hareem's father and Naveen's husband
- Michelle Mumtaz as Shiza Ahmed
- Hamza Tariq Jamil as Bilal
- Huma Nawab as Bilal's mother
- Sajida Syed as Shagufta, Pari, Shiza's & Shehryar's mother
- Rana Majid as Shehryar, Pari and Shiza's brother
- Faiza Gillani as Fariha, Pari and Shiza's sister-in-law
- Arez Ahmed as Asfand love interest of Hina
- Mehmood Aslam as Malik Jahangir
- Sabahat Adil as Asfand's mother
- Ali Safina as Babar, Pari's d boss and later husband
- Areeba Shahood Alvi as Naveen, Babar's sister and Pari's sister-in-law
- Emaan Ahmed (child star) as Hareem, Pari and Hamza's daughter and Babar's stepdaughter

== Production ==
The series is written by Maimoona Aziz, who previously wrote the 2020 series Tera Ghum Aur Hum, and directed by Nadeem Siddiqui, who previously directed 2020 series Tarap.
