= Susraal Mera =

Pakistani television series

- Genre: Soap series Romantic; Family drama
- Written by: Nuzhat Saman
- Directed by: Saima Waseem
- Starring: Zarnish Khan; Imran Aslam; Ali Abbas; Behroze Sabzwari
- Theme music composer: Mad Music
- Opening theme: "Susral mera" by Beena Khan
- Composer: Sahir Ali Bagga
- Country of origin: Pakistan
- Original language: Urdu
- No. of episodes: 91

Production
- Producer: Momina Duraid
- Production location: Karachi
- Cinematography: Irfan Kashmiri
- Editors: Saad Bin Javed; M. Adeel Khalid; Suffiyan Akbar Khan; Ali Sufi
- Camera setup: Multi-camera setup
- Running time: 20 minutes

Original release
- Network: Hum TV
- Release: 15 September 2014 – 19 February 2015

Susraal Mera (transl. My In-laws) is a Pakistani television soap series aired on Hum TV. The series was written by Nuzhat Saman, directed by Saima Waseem and produced by Momina Duraid of MD Productions. It stars an assemble cast of Zarnish Khan, Behroze Sabzwari, Umair Laghari, Ahsan Qadir, Imran Aslam (actor), Madiha Hussain Zaidi, Mahjabeen Habib, Maryum Tariq, Rozina, Mehmood Akhter, Myra Sajid, Shaista Jabeen, Ali Asghar Abbas and Anas Ali Imran. At 3rd Hum Awards series won all of its three nominations including: Best Soap Actor for Imran Aslam, Best Soap Actress for Zarnish Khan and Best Soap Series for Momina Duraid.

== Outline ==
Sasural Mera is a story of two sisters, Alina and Alizeh. Alina is fun-loving and vivacious girl while Alizeh is career-oriented and serious. Their father Bashir Ahmed is a businessman and guardian of his sister-in-law and her two sons Nauman and Salman. In a family wedding, they meet Jabbar Ahmed's family. Jabbar has a very conservative mind-set and considers domestic violence as his right. Jabbar's son, Adil falls for Alizeh and they trick Bashir Ahmed and his family into believing that Jabbar's family is as liberal and well-educated as their own. Adil and Alizeh get married but soon she discovers the true faces of Jabbar's family. The story takes a new turn when Adil's sister, Nimra falls for Salman and starts underhand tactics to manipulate Salman, Alina and Alizeh.

== Cast ==
- Zarnish Khan as Aliza
- Behroze Sabzwari as Haji Jabbar
- Umair Lagari
- Ahsan Qadir as Arif
- Imran Aslam as Adil
- Madiha Hussain Zaidi as Alina
- Mahjabeen Habib as Hina
- Mehmood Akhter as Aliza and Alina's father
- Shaista Jabeen as Jabbar's wife
- Ali Abbas as Salman
- Huma Nawab as Salman's mother
- Marium Ansari as Nimra (Nimi)
- Anas Ali Imran

== Accolades ==
At 3rd Hum Awards soap won all of its nominations:

- Best Soap Actor - Imran Aslam
- Best Soap Actress - Zarnish Khan
- Best Soap Series - Momina Duraid
