= Lubna Aslam =

Pakistani actress

- Born: Lubna Aslam; Karachi, Pakistan
- Occupation: Actress
- Years active: 1976–present

Lubna Aslam is a Pakistani actress. She has appeared in a number of television serials and commercials. She has worked with directors such as Babar Javed, Mehreen Jabbar, and Haissam Hussain. She has often been cast in the role of a liberal mother. Mostly she has done the role of a mother except for Meri Zaat Zarra-e-Benishan (2010). Her work includes the dramas Parchaiyan (1976) Daam (2010), Roshan Sitara (2012), Ishq Gumshuda (2010), Zid (2014), Thora Sa Aasman (2016), Sehra Main Safar (2016) and Mann Mayal (2016).

== Filmography ==
=== Film ===
Year	Title	Role	Notes
2011	Bhag Amina Bhag	Aneela	
2013	Armaan	Zartaab's mother.	
2016	Actor In Law	Shan's mother	
2016	Maalik	Fatima	Main Protagonist

=== Selected Television ===
Year	Title	Role	Notes
1976	Parchaiyan	Gul	
2001	Dard Kay Faslay	Fakhira	
2009	Tum Jo Miley	Samina	
2009	Meri Zaat Zarra-e-Benishan	Arfeen's elder sister	
2010	Hawa Rait Aur Aangan	Arfa's elder sister	
2010	Daam	Amna; Zara's mother	
2010	Ishq Gumshuda	Neha's mother	
2010	Qaid-e-Tanhai	Maliha; Moiz's sister	
2011	Meray Khwab Raiza Raiza	Farkhanda Apa	
2011	Kitni Girhain Baaki Hain	Recurring	
2012	Dil Ko Manana Nehi Aya	Sarah	
2012	Meray Dard Ko Jo Zuban Miley	Shamim	
2012	Roshun Sitara	Mansoor's mother	
2012	Aankh Bhar Asman	Tahira	
2012	Meri Saheli Meri Humjoli	Neelam's aunt	
2012	Sasural ke Rang Anokhay	Recurring	
2012	Shehryar Shahzadi	Aunty	
2014	Zid	Khala	
2015	Alvida	Zeenat	
2016	Thoda Sa Aasman	Muneeza; Mansoor's wife	
2016	Ghalti	Mrs. Taha	
2015	Sehra Main Safar	Fauzia	
2016	Haasil	Hareem's mother	
2015	Kaanch Ki Guriya	Saliha	
2016	Faltu Larki	Almas	
2015	Tumhare Siwa	Rania's mother	
2017	Amanat	Amma	
2016	Mera Dard Bayzuban	Faris's mother	
2016	Kitni Girhain Baaki Hain 2	Aqib's mother/Raheela and Aaliya's aunt	Episode 10, 22
2016	Mann Mayal	Saliha; Manahil's aunt	
2016	Sanam	Ayesha; Ayla's mother	
2017	Pagli	Gulrukh's mother	
2018	Ustani Jee	Aslam's mother	Episode 4
2018	Ishq Tamasha	Mehrab's aunt	
2019	Dil Kiya Karay	Talat	
2019	Khaas	Sadaf Faraz	
2019	Surkh Chandni	Rukhsana Aida's mother	
2019	Alif	Suraiyya	
2020	Tarap	Sadia	
2020	Kashf	Rashida	
2022	Oye Motti Season 2	Meerab's mother	
2023	Aitraaf	Kulsoom	
2023	Dagh-e-Dil	Naeema	
2023	Jannat Se Aagay	Tasneem	
2023	Namak Haram	Mona	
2024	Mehroom	Safia	
2024	BOL Kahani	Shahista	
2025	Umme Ayesha Season 2	Sajida	
2025	Makafaat Season 7	Munawar's mother	
2025	Agar Tum Sath Ho	Saba	
2025	Sauda	Farida	
2025	Mohra	Shaheena	

=== Web series ===
Year	Title	Role	Network
2021	Dhoop Ki Deewar	Rabia	ZEE5
