= Ishq Tamasha =

Pakistani television series

- Genre: Romance
- Written by: Misbah Nosheen
- Directed by: Danish Nawaz
- Starring: Junaid Khan; Aiman Khan; Kinza Hashmi; Faizan Khawaja
- Country of origin: Pakistan
- Original language: Urdu
- No. of seasons: 1
- No. of episodes: 28

Production
- Executive producer: Momina Duraid
- Camera setup: Multi-camera setup
- Production company: MD Productions

Original release
- Network: Hum TV
- Release: 25 February – 16 September 2018

Related
- Tumhari Marium; Tajdeed e Wafa

Ishq Tamasha (Urdu: عشق تماشا, lit. 'Love Show') is a Pakistani romantic drama television series telecasted on Hum TV since 25 February 2018. Produced by Momina Duraid under MD Productions and directed by Danish Nawaz, it focuses on the lives of 4 individuals : Mehrab, Rushna, Mirha and Arham played by Junaid Khan, Kinza Hashmi, Aiman Khan and Faizan Khawaja respectively. The story besides the characters is about Mirha's life getting turned upside down due to Mehrab and the evil ethics of Rushna.

== Plot ==
Rushna (Kinza Hashmi) and Mirha (Aiman Khan) are cousin sisters who live together with Rushna's mother (Saba Faisal) and her mother-in-law. Rushna's brother, Wahaj (Furqan Qureshi) wants to marry Mirha. Mirha's aunt (Chachijaan), who is Rushna's mother, does not like her one bit and tries hard to make Mirha look horrible in front of the family. Arham (Faizan Khawaja) sees Rushna at a bakery, and pays for her brownies as the previous brownie she bought fell on the floor and a random kid ran away with it. Arham falls in love with Rushna instantly. He tries to woo her with phone calls and gifts where he manages to make Rushna fall for him, but Rushna misunderstood Mehrab (Junaid Khan) as Arham in a car. Arham decides to propose to her and Rushna rejects him at sight for his looks. Mehrab decides to kidnap Rushna to marry her to Arham to fulfil Arham's desires but when Mehrab rings the door bell and Mirha answers, Mehrab pulls her into a car and takes her to a farmhouse. He kidnaps Mirha thinking she is Rushna and Mirha is forced to live in Mehrab's house because Chachijaan is unwilling to accept her and assumes she was doing wrong. Chachijaan also doesn't let Mirha back into the house because she considers this a good opportunity to get Wahaj to stop loving Mirha by assuming and not letting her in. Mehrab brings Arham's proposal again to Rushna who rejects Arham brutally and Arham drives off in sheer anger and dies in a car accident. Mehrab vows to get revenge and he marries Rushna to get revenge for Arham. Rushna sees Mirha living in the same house and tries to get her out which she gets successful in, as Chachijaan accepts her back but Mirha is abused and Wahaj does not defend her, which is why Mirha rejects Wahaj's marriage proposal. Rushna thinks Mirha is out to steal her husband which is in bad blood. However, she does not know why Mehrab is doing this. Palwasha and Ghufran love each other, and want to elope. When Palwasha goes with Mirha outside she runs away to see Ghufran and they both are about to elope, but Palwasha comes home from fear and to not ‘harm’ her family's honour. Mirha leaves the house after Wahaj accuses her of being the reason that Palwasha ran away when in reality Palwasha ran away on her own terms but came back. Rushna's head is hurting a lot as well and she does not know why. Chachijaan kicks Rushna out the house due to her ego; and Wahaj finds out that Chachijaan has always made Mirha look bad and cuts all ties with Chachijaan leaving her sad, but her ego is still bigger than ever as Wahaj is leaving the house and Chachijaan does not bother to even say goodbye and instead says that Wahaj could leave. Mirha lives in a hostel now and continuously she rejects Wahaj, as well as Mehrab. After being rejected by Mirha, Wahaj gives Mirha one last letter with flowers and cries continuously while going back. Rushna is on medication due to having continuous severe headaches. Rushna has landed in the hospital due to accidental overdose. Rushna, who was admitted in hospital soon realizes her mistake and asks for apology from Mehraab (whom she thought was Arham) for not valuing his love at all and dies emotionally. Palwasha picks up a phone call in which Rushna's shocking death is revealed. Aqeela, now aware of Rushna's death soon admits her mistake that she was wrong, Aqeela later asks an apology from Mirha for what she did to her. In the end, Mehraab proposes to Mirha and she accepts thus ending the drama.

== Cast ==
- Junaid Khan as Mehrab
- Aiman Khan as Mirha
- Kinza Hashmi as Rushna
- Faizan Khawaja as Arham; Mehrab's brother
- Alizeh Shah as Palwasha; Rushna's younger sister
- Saba Faisal as Aqeela; Mirha's aunt
- Lubna Aslam as Phuppo; Mehrab and Arham's aunt
- Kinza Malik as Aqeela's sister; Rushna's aunt
- Furqan Qureshi as Wahaj; Rushna's brother
- Areesha Shah as Uswa; Rushna's youngest sister

== Soundtrack ==
The title song was sung by Sanam Marvi & Sanwal Esakhelvi. The music was composed by Naved Nashad and the lyrics were penned down by Mubashir Hassan.

Soundtrack album by Sanam Marvi & Sanwal Esakhelvi
- Released: 25 April 2018
- Recorded: 2017
- Genre: Television soundtrack
- Length: (2:05)
- Language: Urdu
- Label: Hum TV

Music video
- "Ishq Tamasha" OST on YouTube

== Broadcast ==
Ishq Tamasha originally premiered on 25 February 2018. The serial aired a weekly episode on every Sunday succeeding Tajdeed e Wafa. It was aired on Hum Europe in UK, on Hum TV USA in USA and Hum TV Mena on UAE.

It also aired on national television in Pakistan on PTV Home. The show started to air on 3 June 2020 and aired twice in a week.

The show was also adapted by the Horn Cable Television of Somaliland as Cishqi Tamaashaa. In Arab world, the show was premiered on the subscription channel of MBC Group, MBC Bollywood under the title انتقام. The show was dubbed in Pashto and aired on Hum Pashto 1 under the same title.

== Awards and nominations ==
Year	Award	Category	Recipient(s)	Result	Ref.
2019	Hum Awards	Best Actress	Aiman Khan	Nominated	
2019	Hum Awards	Best On-screen couple	Aiman Khan and Junaid Khan	Nominated	
2019	Hum Awards	Best Television Sensation - Female	Alizeh Shah	Won	
2019	Hum Awards	Best Actor in a Negative Role	Kinza Hashmi	Nominated	
2019	Hum Awards	Best Television serial	Ishq Tamasha	Nominated	
