= Aiman Khan =

Pakistani actress (born 1998)

- Born: Karachi, Sindh, Pakistan
- Occupations: Influencer, actress
- Years active: 2013–2018
- Known for: Mann Mayal; Khaali Haath; Ishq Tamasha
- Spouse: Muneeb Butt (m. 2018)
- Children: 3
- Relatives: Minal Khan (twin sister); Ahsan Mohsin Ikram (brother in law)

Aiman Mubeen Khan (Urdu: ایمن خان) is a former Pakistani actress who appeared in Urdu television. She made her acting debut in 2013 with ARY Digital's drama Meri Beti and appeared in several serials. Khan got recognition after playing the female protagonist in Khaali Haath and Ghar Titli Ka Par. She was last seen portraying Meeru in Hum TV's Baandi (2018). She earned a nomination for Best Actress at Hum Awards for her work in the former and Ishq Tamasha.

== Personal life ==
Khan was born in Karachi, Sindh, one of a pair of twins, the other being her sister Minal Khan, also an actress. She also has three brothers. Her father, Mubeen Khan, was a police officer serving in Sindh Police while her mother Uzma Khan is a housewife. Khan's father died on 31 December 2020. She belongs to an Urdu-speaking Mohajir family.

Khan married actor Muneeb Butt in Karachi on 21 November 2018. The couple performed their first Umrah during Ramadan 2019. The couple have three children. Their daughter, Amal Muneeb, was born in 2019. They welcomed another baby girl, Miral Muneeb, in 2023, and Naimal Muneeb in 2025.

== Career ==
Aiman Khan made her acting debut in 2012 with the drama 'Mohabbat Bhaar Mai Jaye', which aired on Hum TV.

== Television ==
Year	Show	Role	Director	Refs
2013	Meri Beti	Rida	Badar Mehmood	
2013	Mann Ke Moti	Sehrish	Babar Javed	
2014	Joru Ka Ghulam	Anaya	Ahson Talish	
2014	Digest Writer	Shakeela	Syed Ahmed Kamran	
	Googly Muhala	Nazish (sweety)	Mazhar Moin	
2015	Gila Kis Se Karen	Soha	Irfan Aslam	
2015	Aitraaz	Tina	Aamir Yousuf	
2015	Bay Qasoor	Seher	Syed Atif Hussain	
2015	Khatoon Manzil	Kukku	Mazhar Moin	
2015	Sehra Main Safar	Anaya	Azfar Ali	
2016	Mann Mayal	Rabiya (Biya)	Haseeb Hassan	
2016	Khwab Saraye	Naina	Saima Waseem	
2016	Iss Khamoshi Ka Matlab	Zainab Habib	Mazhar Moin	
2016-2017	Dil Ek Khilona Tha	Maheen	Mehfooz Qureshi	
2017	Zindaan	Farah	Kashif Nisar	
2017	Khaali Haath	Mashal	Wajahat Hussain	
2017	Hari Hari Churiyaan	Aiman	Syed Atif Hussain	
2017	Ghar Titli Ka Par	Shafaq	Mohsin Talat	
2018	Kaif-e-Baharan	Seerat Fatima	Nadeem Siddique	
2018	Ishq Tamasha	Mirha	Danish Nawaz	
2018	Bay Dardi	Biya	Ahmed Bhatti	
2018	Baandi	Meeru	Syed Ahmed Kamran	

=== Telefilm and other appearance ===
Year	Show	Role	Director	Notes	ref(s)
2013	Behadd	Sara	Asim Raza	Telefilm	
2015	Googly Mohalla	Nazish	Mazhar Moin	Cricket World Cup (Special)	
2015	Lucknow Wale Lateefullah	Aaliyah Ahmed	Mohammad Iftikhar Iffi	Telefilm	
2016	Kitni Girhain Baaki Hain (Season 2)	Bushra	Angeline Malik	Episode 16 (Maut baraye farokht)	
2017	Yeh Ishq Hai	Hiba	Various	Episode 3 (Sirf Tum)	
2017	Kitni Girhain Baaki Hain (Season 2)	Fariya	Angeline Malik	Episode 5 (Qubool Hai)	
2018	Khana Khud Garam Karo	Rumana	Kashif Saleem	Telefilm	

=== Special appearances ===
Year	Show	Role	Notes
2017	Mazaaq Raat	Guest with Minal Khan	
2017	Tonite with HSY	Guest	
2017	Jago Pakistan Jago	Guest	To promote Baandi
2018	The After Moon Show (season 1)	Guest	
2018	Knorr Noodles Boriyat Busters (season 2)	Guest participant	
2019	Rewind With Samina Peerzada (season 3)	Guest	

== Awards and nominations ==
Year	Award	Category	Work	Result	Ref
2019	Hum Awards	Best Actress	Ishq Tamasha		
2019	Hum Awards	Best On-screen couple with (Junaid Khan)	Ishq Tamasha		
2019	Hum Awards	Best Actress	Baandi		
2019	Hum Awards	Best On-screen Couple with (Muneeb Butt)	Baandi		
