= Anoushey Ashraf =

Pakistani VJ and actress

Anoushey Ashraf (born 14 April 1983) is a Pakistani video jockey, TV host, radio show host, producer, actor, animal rights advocate and environmentalist. She has been the face of brands such as Ponds, Warid Telecom, L'Oreal, Lulusar and MTV Pakistan.

== Biography ==
Anoushey Ashraf was born in Karachi, Sindh, Pakistan, into a Pakistani Muslim family of Iranian descent. Her father is a businessman and owned cooking oil factories. She has two sisters, Natasha and Alizeh. After completing her A Levels, she did her B.A., majoring in English Literature. She started her career in early 2002.

As an actress, she appeared in the television shows Sehra Main Safar, Chanar Ghati and Saanp Seerhi. In September 2012, Anoushey joined Health TV, as morning show host. As of 2014, Anoushay co-hosted the Pakistani music competition show Pakistan Idol with Mohib Mirza. She joined the show in the Piano rounds with the final 24 contestants of the show.

In 2017 she was engaged for a brief period.
