= Muneeb Butt =

Pakistani actor

- منیب بٹ
- Born: 14 April 1992 (age 34); Karachi, Pakistan
- Citizenship: Pakistani
- Education: Iqra University
- Occupations: Actor; Model
- Years active: 2012–present
- Notable work: Kaisa Hai Naseeban; Koi Chand Rakh; Silsilay; Yaariyan; Baandi
- Spouse: Aiman Khan (m. 2018)
- Children: 3
- Relatives: Minal Khan (sister-in-law)

Muneeb Butt (Urdu: منیب بٹ) is a Pakistani actor who works in Urdu cinema and television.

He started acting in 2012 and has appeared in numerous television serials including Daldal (2017), Baandi (2018), Koi Chand Rakh (2018), Kaisa Hai Naseeban (2019), Yaariyan (2019), Qarar (2020) and Baddua (2021).

== Early life and education ==
Butt was born into a Kashmiri family in Karachi, Pakistan, and has two siblings, a brother and a sister.

He earned a BS degree in media studies.

== Career ==
After working as a commercial model for many well-known brands for several years, he made his acting debut on TV in 2012, with a drama serial called Baandi which aired on ARY Digital.

== Personal life ==
Butt was engaged to actress Aiman Khan with whom he has worked in serials Bay Qasoor (2015), Googly Muhalla (2015), Khatoon Manzil (2015) Khwab Saraye (2016) and Baandi (2018). The couple got married in November 2018. They couple has three children, born in 2019, 2023, and 2025.

== Filmography ==
Key
†	Denotes film / series that has not released yet

=== Television serials ===
Year	Title	Role	Channel	Notes	Ref
2012	Baandi		ARY Digital	TV Debut	
2013	Humnasheen	Saqib	Hum TV		
2013	Kadoorat	Adnan	Hum TV		
2014	Shanakht	Haris	Hum TV	Cameo	
2015	Bay Qasoor	Babar	ARY Digital		
2015	Rishton Ki Dor	Zain	Geo Entertainment		
2015	Googly Mohalla	Farhat / Goli	PTV Home	Cricket World Cup 2015 special series	
2015	Judaai	Hassam	Geo Entertainment		
2015	Khatoon Manzil	Aamir Sajid	ARY Digital		
2015	Aik Thi Misaal	Wasiq	Hum TV		
2016	Khwab Saraye	Faizan	Hum TV		
2016	Tum Yaad Aaye	Ahmer	ARY Digital		
2016	Khwaabon Ke Darmiyaan	Faraz Mustafa	Zee TV	Indian TV debut	
2017	Kitni Girhain Baaki Hain (season 2)	Arsalan	Hum TV	Anthology series; Episode 37	
2017	Zindaan	Asad	ARY Digital		
2017	Yeh Ishq Hai	Humaiyun	ARY Digital	Episode "Kiya Yehi Pyar Hai"	
2017	Ghairat	Zohaib	ARY Digital		
2017	Daldal	Kamran	Hum TV		
2018	Silsilay	Shahzaib	Geo Entertainment		
2018	Zid	Muneeb	Express TV		
2018	Koi Chand Rakh	Umair	ARY Digital		
2018	Baandi	Wali Ali Khan	Hum TV	Also appeared in 2012 series of same title	
2019	Kaisa Hai Naseeban	Ahmed	ARY Digital		
2019	Yaariyan	Umair	Geo Entertainment		
2019	Choti Choti Batain	Rehaan	Hum TV		
2020	Qaraar	Ammar	Hum TV		
2021	Mujhay Vida Kar	Usman	ARY Digital		
2021	Baddua	Junaid	ARY Digital		
2022	Yeh Na Thi Hamari Qismat	Ayaan	ARY Digital		
2022	Qalandar	Tabrez	Geo Entertainment		
2023	Sar-e-Rah	Sarang	ARY Digital		
2023	Tere Aany Se	Mahir	Geo Entertainment	Ramadan special drama	
2024	Shiddat	Sultan	Geo Entertainment		
2026	Ishq Mein Tere Sadqay	Zulfiqar Shah	Geo Entertainment		
2026	Tapish	Shahzer Sultan	Geo Entertainment		

=== Telefilms ===
Year	Title	Role	Network	Ref
2017	Rishta Baraye Farokht	Safdar	Hum TV	
2019	Pinky Ka Dulha	Bilal	Hum TV	
2020	Lo Pakray Gaye	Shakeel	Geo Entertainment	
2021	Wedding Virus	Sherry	ARY Digital	
2021	Filmy Siyappa	Nayal	Geo Entertainment	
2022	Made For China	Alam	Hum TV	
2022	Mast Mohabbat	Affan	Geo Entertainment	
2025	Dil De Baithe		Green Entertainment	
2025	Dil Ne Kaha Dil Se	Umer	Geo Entertainment	
2025	Ye Bahu Nahin Chalegi		ARY Digital	
2025	Viral Abba		ARY Digital	
2026	Bhaag Sunny Bhaag	Sunny	ARY Digital	

=== Films ===
Year	Title	Role	Notes	Ref
2015	Halla Gulla	Udaas	Debut film	
TBA	Ishq 2020			

== Awards and nominations ==
Year	Awards	Category	Project	Result	Ref(s)
2019	ARY Digital - Social Media Drama Awards	Best Supporting Actor (Male)	Koi Chand Rakh	Won	
2019	Hum Awards	Best Actor Popular	Baandi	Nominated	
2019	Hum Awards	Best Onscreen Couple	Baandi	Nominated	
2020	Pakistan International Screen Awards	Best Television Actor	Yaariyan	Nominated	
