= Al-Jafiah =

Al-Jafi'ah الجافعة
- Village
- Location in Syria
- Coordinates: 35°0′36″N 36°35′44″E
- Country: Syria
- Governorate: Hama
- District: Hama
- Subdistrict: Hirbnafsah

Population (2004)
  - Total: 833
- Time zone: UTC+3 (AST)
- City Qrya Pcode: C3057

Al-Jafi'ah (Arabic: الجافعة) is a Syrian village located in the Hirbnafsah Subdistrict in Hama District. According to the Syria Central Bureau of Statistics (CBS), al-Jafi'ah had a population of 833 in the 2004 census. Its inhabitants are predominantly Sunni Muslims.

== Bibliography ==
- Robinson, E.; Smith, E. (1841). Biblical Researches in Palestine, Mount Sinai and Arabia Petraea: A Journal of Travels in the year 1838. Vol. 3. Boston: Crocker & Brewster.
