= Khwab Saraye =

- Genre: Family drama Romantic drama
- Created by: Momina Duraid
- Written by: Aliya Bukhari
- Directed by: Saima Waseem
- Starring: Muneeb Butt; Aiman Khan; Sonia Mishal; Aijaz Aslam
- Theme music composer: Shani Arshad
- Opening theme: Singer; Nabeel Shaukat Ali; Poet; Naseer Turabi
- Ending theme: "Dil Aitbar" By Nabeel Shaukat Ali
- Country of origin: Pakistan
- Original language: Urdu
- No. of episodes: 37

Production
- Producer: Momina Duraid
- Production location: Karachi
- Cinematography: Irfan Resham
- Editors: Muhammad Adeel Khalid; Chief Editor; Mahmood Ali
- Camera setup: Multi-camera setup

Original release
- Network: Hum TV
- Release: 17 May – 26 September 2016

Khwab Saraye (Eng: Dream House) is a Pakistani television series premiered on Hum TV on 17 May 2016. It is produced by Momina Duraid under MD Productions and written by Aliya Bukhari. It stars Aijaz Aslam, Sonia Mishal, Muneeb Butt and his future wife Aiman Khan.

== Plot ==
It is a story of Abrar Khan (Rasheed Naz) who belongs to a rich family. He has two sons, Waqar (Khaled Anam) & Sajjad (Aijaz Aslam) and a daughter Farhat, who is married to Waheed(Nauman Masood), her father's choice. Waqar is married to Bilquis (Saman Ansari), and has a son, Faizan(Muneeb Butt). Sajjad is not married yet. Waheed is solely interested in Farhat for her money, which drives her to depression. Sajjad helps her by employing Sania (Sonia Mishal), the niece of Jameel(Said Shah). After her father's death, Sania and her mother live with Jameel, Aunt Zarina (Farah Nadeem) and her cousin Lubna. Lubna is a metric pass girl who is not interested in studies. Zarina makes Sania the maid of her home on the suggestion of Lubna. Jameel is a shopkeeper and cannot afford much but tries his best to take care of Aapa & Sania. Sania wanted to continue her studies but is unable to, so she tries to find another job. She then meets Sajjad who employs her to look after Farhat. During this time, Sajjad and Sania's relationship begins to grow. Abrar & his friend meet a hotel's waiter, Baqir (Behroze Sabzwari). Baqir is married to Salma (Farah Shah) and has a daughter, Naina (Aiman Khan)Faizan and Naina are actually class fellows and they fall in love with each other. But Bilquis sees another girl for Faizan which he refuses. Abrar refuses his marriage with Naina because her father is a waiter of a hotel. Naina's parents also do not accept but eventually accept under pressure. Faizan and Naina marry in front of Naina's parents, despite Abrar's refusal. Faizan's parents find out and decide to disinherit Faizan from the family, including blocking his access to his bank account. Faizan and Naina now must find a way to live on their own despite these challenges. Jameel dies of tuberculosis, which gives attack to Badi Aapa. Waheed likes Sania. Zarina keeps forcing Sania to marry Waheed. Farhat & Abrar prevent Sajjad from marrying anyone except Shireen (Zainab Jameel), who is an employee and later president of the office where Sania works. She had always dreamed of marrying Sajjad. After some time, Faizan and Naina have a daughter but Faizan leaves Naina and his daughter as he can not afford them. Naina goes to her father's house along with her daughter. Sajjad places a condition for marrying Shereen. He agrees to do so if Faizan returns home. Later, Abrar tells Sania that her father Ansar was his younger brother. In the end, Sania marries Sajjad.

== Cast ==
- Aijaz Aslam as Sajjad
- Sonia Mishal as Sania
- Muneeb Butt as Faizan (Faizee)
- Aiman Khan as Naina
- Zainab Jameel as Shireen
- Rasheed Naz as Abrar (Sajjad, Farhat & Waqar's father; Faizan's grandfather, Sania's paternal uncle)
- Behroze Sabzwari as Baqir (Naina's father)
- Farah Shah as Salma (Naina's mother)
- Khalid Anam as Waqar (Faizan's father)
- Saman Ansari as Bilquis (Faizan's mother)
- Farah Nadeem as Zarina (Jameel's wife)
- Nauman Masood as Waheed
- Sajid Shah as Jameel (Badi Aapa's brother; Sania's maternal uncle; Zarina's husband; Lubna's father)
- Laila Wasti as Farhat
- Aamir Jamal as Ansar (Abrar's brother; Sania's father; Sajjad, Farhat & Waqar's paternal uncle)
- Erum Azam as Lubna
- Tahira Imam as Badi Aapa (Sania's mother; Abrar's sister-in-law)
- Salma Shaheen as Mrs. Hassan (Shireen's mother)

== See also ==
- 2016 in Pakistani television
- List of programs broadcast by Hum TV
