= Bay Qasoor =

Pakistani television serial

- Title screen
- بے قصور
- Genre: Drama Serial; Romance
- Written by: Samina Ijaz
- Directed by: Syed Atif Hussain
- Starring: Samina Peerzada; Sajid Hasan; Saboor Ali; Waseem Abbas; Aiman Khan; Javeria Abbasi; Muneeb Butt
- Original language: Urdu

Production
- Producers: Fahad Mustafa and Dr. Ali Kazmi.
- Running time: 45 Minutes
- Production company: Big Bang Entertainment

Original release
- Network: ARY Digital
- Release: 11 November 2015 – 1 June 2016

Bay Qasoor (Urdu: بے قصور, lit. 'Innocent') is a Pakistani television serial premiered on 11 November 2015 on ARY Digital. It is produced by Fahad Mustafa and Ali Kazmi under Big Bang Entertainment. The cast includes Samina Peerzada, Sajid Hassan, Saboor Ali, Waseem Abbas and Aiman Khan among others.

== Cast ==
- Samina Pirzada as Sadaf
- Sajid Hassan as Shehryar (Sadaf's first husband)
- Saboor Aly as Hira (Daughter of Sadaf and Shehryar)
- Waseem Abbas as Waseem (Sadaf's second husband, Seher's father, Hira's step-father)
- Aiman Khan as Seher (Waseem's spoiled daughter)
- Javeria Abbasi as Nuzhat
- Salahuddin Tunio as Amin
- Muneeb Butt as Babar (Proposed to marry Hira)
- Raeed Muhammad Alam as Sunny
- Fozia Mushtaq
- Najma Kawis
- Ali Josh

=== Guest appearance ===
- Aijaz Aslam as Zia
- Jinaan Hussain as Sana
- Hina Ashfaque
- Noshaba Javed

== See also ==
- List of programs broadcast by ARY Digital
