= Neeyat (TV series) =

Pakistani television series

- Title screen
- Genre: Drama; Romance; Emotional
- Written by: Larry Pontius
- Directed by: Mehreen Jabbar
- Starring: Humayun Saeed; Mahira Khan; Ahsan Khan; Deepti Gupta; Ismat Zaidi; Shehryar Zaidi
- Theme music composer: Waqar Ali
- Opening theme: "Kaise Bataaoon Saathiya" by Sajjad Ali
- Composer: Waqar Ali
- Country of origin: Pakistan
- Original language: Urdu
- No. of seasons: 1
- No. of episodes: 20

Production
- Producers: Samina Humayun Saeed; Shahzad Nasib
- Camera setup: Multi-camera setup
- Running time: 37 minutes
- Production company: Six Sigma Entertainment

Original release
- Network: ARY Digital
- Release: 24 June – 21 November 2011

Neeyat (Urdu: نیت) (English: Intention) is a 2011 Pakistani romantic-drama television series, produced by Samina Humayun Saeed and Shahzad Nasib under the production banner Six Sigma Entertainment. It is directed by Mehreen Jabbar and written by Larry Pontius. It features Humayun Saeed, Mahira Khan, Ahsan Khan, and Deepti Gupta in lead roles.

It marks the television debut of the now-highest paid actress, Mahira Khan, and her first collaboration with Humayun Saeed; the second being the film Bin Roye and its TV version.

== Plot ==
Neeyat is about emotions that still exist within the few inhabitants of the emotionless society of New York, as they have their roots back to the socially bonded society of Pakistan.

Set in New York, the series tells the story of a Pakistani citizen, Sikandar (Humayun Saeed), who is living and working on a temporary visa. He has been dating Ayla (Mahira Khan), a student at Columbia University pursuing her master's degree. Ayla belongs to a very strong political family back in Pakistan but maintains limited contact with them. Ismail (Ahsan Khan) happens to be a close friend of hers. A photographer by profession, he thinks he can win her over even though he is aware of her relationship with Sikandar. Upon finding out that Sikandar's visa has been made redundant and faced with the possibility of him moving back to Pakistan, Ayla proposes that he marry an American citizen--- a contract marriage that will allow him to remain in the country. Sikandar resists, explaining that it may result in legal complications, but Ayla is adamant and finally convinces him. It so happens that she runs into Mariam, an American of Pakistani origin who works as a part-time waitress and is a struggling actor barely making ends meet. The proposition of having a place to live and money in exchange for a contract marriage seems like a lottery win for Mariam, and she immediately agrees to it. However, once the marriage takes place, Mariam starts wanting more; she becomes attuned to living a comfortable, stable life with a man she starts developing feelings for. Slowly but steadily, she manages to sow the seeds of discord between Ayla and Sikandar and eventually succeeds in drawing them apart.

Devastated by her breakup with Sikander, Ayla finds comfort with Ismail. The two of them continue to grow closer until Ismail finally proposes. Ayla is initially hesitant but gives in, thinking she must move on, as Sikandar has too. Sikandar, trying his best to keep his sanity intact while balancing his life, runs into Ayla and is shocked to know that she is engaged. In a moment of unreconciled thoughts, he proposes to Mariam and asks her to be his wife--- for real this time. Ecstatic at the thought of having her dreams turn into a reality, she agrees. Ayla is confused after her meeting with Sikandar and decides to pursue him, but is once again shattered after finding out he has married Mariam. Ismail struggles for attention, and it is later revealed that he is suffering from some sort of mental disorder and will require treatment.

Mariam, who is being blackmailed by her ex-fiancé, realizes that she can't keep up trying to conceal her past from Sikandar, which makes him suspicious. Sikandar feels trapped in his marriage and regrets his rash decision, but sees no way out either. Ayla isolates him further because she is too broken to take a chance with him again. After a series of misunderstandings, Mariam finally realizes that she can never be truly happy until she stops lying to herself. She decides to leave Sikandar and give him his life back, and Ayla finally comes around and agrees to start afresh, with Sikandar looking forward to a better tomorrow.

== Cast ==
- Humayun Saeed as Sikandar
- Mahira Khan as Ayla
- Ahsan Khan as Ismail
- Deepti Gupta as Mariam
- Gulfam Ramay as Gul G
- Ismat Zaidi as Sikandar's mother
- Shehryar Zaidi as Sikandar's father
