= Arshad Mehmood =

Arshad Mehmood or Mahmood may refer to:

- Arshad Mehmood (composer) (active from 2003), Pakistani composer, singer and actor in the television and film industry
- Arshad Mehmood (singer) (active from 1990), Pakistani singer in the film industry
- Arshad Mahmood (field hockey) (born 1947), Pakistani hockey player
