= Hum TV =

Pakistani television channel

Hum TV ہم
- Hum TV logo since January 2013
- Country: Pakistan
- Broadcast area: Asia; Middle East; Americas; Europe
- Network: Hum Network
- Headquarters: Karachi, Sindh, Pakistan

Programming
- Language: Urdu
- Picture format: (1080i 16:9, MPEG-4, HDTV) (2018–present)

Ownership
- Owner: Sultana Siddiqui; Duraid Qureshi
- Sister channels: Hum Masala; Hum Sitaray; Hum News; Hum Europe; Hum Pashto 1

History
- Launched: 17 January 2005; 21 years ago
- Former names: Eye TV (2005–2011)

Links
- Website: www.hum.tv

Availability

Streaming media
- HUM TV Live: Watch Live
- Sling TV: Internet Protocol television

Hum TV HD is a 24-hour Urdu general entertainment TV channel based in Karachi, Pakistan. It was founded by Sultana Siddiqui and Duraid Qureshi in 2005.

It is owned by Hum Network Limited and traded on the Pakistan Stock Exchange as (HUMNL).

Hum Network Limited was known as Eye Television Network Limited prior to 21 January 2011. Hum TV began its transmission on 17 January 2005. In March 2013, Hum Network held its first Hum Awards ceremony. As of 1 May 2018, Hum TV shut down its SD feed and shifted to HD resolution in Pakistan.

Hum TV is one of Pakistan's entertainment networks and maintains a fanbase on social media in Pakistan, India, Bangladesh, and streaming platforms, as well as on television.

== History ==
Former logo of Hum TV (2005–2013)

The channel's drama series Humsafar, broadcast in 2011–2012, has become the most successful program of the channel to date, earning it widespread acclaim and international recognition. Due to its success, critics referred to Pakistani television as a "Golden Age".

At the 1st Hum Awards ceremony, it was awarded the Hum Honorary Phenomenal Serial Award. Hum TV caters to all genres of entertainment. While HUM caters to urban Pakistan, most dramas on Hum TV at the moment are skewed towards a teen/youth audience, with some other serials being aimed at a more mature urban audience.

== Hum TV's Digital Expansion on YouTube ==
Hum Network, a Pakistani media company, is increasingly relying on its YouTube presence for revenue. Historically a traditional broadcaster, Hum TV has seen its digital income, primarily from its official YouTube channel, grow to become a significant part of its business. The channel boasts over 51 million subscribers and 46 billion views, contributing to a substantial rise in digital revenue. While the recent acquisition of Ten Sports has shifted the overall revenue mix, the growth of YouTube as a revenue stream for Hum Network has been a major trend, highlighting the company's successful adaptation to the digital landscape.

== Current programming ==
=== Original series ===
| Date | Show | Ref |
|---|---|---|
| 4 January 2026 | Daam-e-Mohabbat | |

=== Ramadan series ===
| Date | Show | Ref |
|---|---|---|
| 19 February 2026 | Dekh Zara Pyar Se | |

=== Dubbed series ===
| Date | Show | Ref |
|---|---|---|
| 11 August 2025 | Sultan Salahuddin Ayyubi Season 2 | |

== Upcoming programming ==
| Date | Show | Ref |
|---|---|---|
| 2026 | Leader | |
| 2026 | Winter Love | |

== Former programming ==
=== Anthology series ===
| Name | First aired | Last aired | Ref |
|---|---|---|---|
| Choti Choti Batain | 10 March 2019 | 6 October 2019 | |
| Kitni Girhain Baaki Hain | 27 March 2011 | 15 July 2015 | |
| Kitni Girhain Baaki Hain: Part 2 | 30 October 2016 | 20 August 2017 | |
| Sasural Ke Rang Anokhay | 11 April 2011 | 12 January 2012 | |
| Shareek-e-Hayat | 27 November 2013 | 15 July 2015 | |
| Ustani Jee | 14 April 2018 | 25 August 2018 | |

=== Ramadan series ===
| Name | First aired | Last aired | Ref(s) |
|---|---|---|---|
| Chand Tara | 23 March 2023 | 21 April 2023 | |
| Chupke Chupke | 14 April 2021 | 13 May 2021 | |
| Dekh Zara Pyar Se | 19 February 2026 | 23 March 2026 | |
| Dhol Bajnay Laga | 27 June 2014 | 28 July 2014 | |
| Dil Pe Dastak | 12 March 2024 | 12 April 2024 | |
| Fairy Tale | 23 March 2023 | 25 November 2023 | |
| Hum Tum | 3 April 2022 | 3 May 2022 | |
| Kaala Doriya | 16 September 2022 | 24 March 2023 | |
| Mannchalay | 13 July 2009 | 24 March 2010 | |
| Paristan | 3 April 2022 | 3 May 2022 | |
| Suno Chanda | 17 May 2018 | 5 June 2019 | |
| Suno Chanda 2 | 7 May 2019 | 5 June 2019 | |
| Tanaa Banaa | 14 April 2021 | 13 May 2021 | |
| Tum Jo Miley | 22 August 2009 | 20 September 2009 | |
| Very Filmy | 12 March 2024 | 12 April 2024 | |
| Dil Wali Gali Mein | 2 March 2025 | 2 April 2025 | |

=== Sitcom series ===
| Name | First aired | Last aired |
|---|---|---|
| Coke Kahani | 3 November 2012 | 31 December 2012 |
| Dramay Baziyan | 2014 | 2014 |
| Extras: The Mango People | 11 June 2011 | 29 September 2013 |
| Fun Khana | 27 January 2012 | 24 August 2012 |
| Halka Na Lo | 31 August 2012 | 2 March 2013 |
| Joru-Ka-Ghulam | 17 October 2014 | 29 May 2016 |
| Mr. Shamim | 28 December 2014 | 5 November 2017 |
| Phir Chand Pe Dastak | 2 August 2011 | 30 August 2011 |
| Resham Gali Ki Husna | 21 July 2019 | 19 January 2020 |
| Uff Meri Family | 4 May 2014 | 7 December 2014 |

=== Prime time series ===
| Year | Name | First aired | Last aired | Ref(s) |
|---|---|---|---|---|
| 2005 | Mere Paas Paas | 2005 | 2005 | |
| 2007 | Man-o-Salwa | 2007 | 2007 | |
| 2007 | Manay Na Ye Dil | 2 September 2007 | 13 April 2008 | |
| 2008 | The Ghost | 2008 | 2009 | |
| 2008 | Mohabbat Karne Walon Kay Naam | 30 August 2008 | 31 January 2009 | |
| 2009 | Aashti | 22 March 2009 | 27 September 2009 | |
| 2009 | Noor Pur Ki Rani | 25 April 2009 | 3 October 2009 | |
| 2009 | Ishq Junoon Deewangi | 15 May 2009 | 16 October 2009 | |
| 2009 | Malaal | 9 October 2009 | 13 March 2010 | |
| 2010 | Noor Bano | 19 February 2010 | 18 June 2010 | |
| 2010 | Vasl | 2 March 2010 | 10 June 2010 | |
| 2010 | Ishq Gumshuda | 25 June 2010 | 2010 | |
| 2010 | Dastaan | 26 June 2010 | 4 December 2010 | |
| 2010 | Qaid-e-Tanhai | 22 October 2010 | 18 March 2011 | |
| 2010 | Parsa | 24 October 2010 | 27 March 2011 | |
| 2010 | Main Abdul Qadir Hoon | 18 December 2010 | 21 May 2011 | |
| 2011 | Pani Jaisa Piyar | 1 March 2011 | 19 May 2011 | |
| 2011 | Mera Naseeb | 1 April 2011 | 21 August 2011 | |
| 2011 | Akhri Barish | 3 April 2011 | 11 December 2011 | |
| 2011 | Mastana Mahi | 26 May 2011 | 15 September 2011 | |
| 2011 | Akbari Asghari | 28 May 2011 | 10 November 2011 | |
| 2011 | Mohabbat Rooth Jaye Toh | 29 May 2011 | 2 October 2011 | |
| 2011 | Maat | 9 September 2011 | 24 February 2012 | |
| 2011 | Humsafar | 24 September 2011 | 3 March 2012 | |
| 2011 | Meray Qatil Meray Dildar | 9 October 2011 | 8 April 2012 | |
| 2011 | Sanjha | 17 November 2011 | 26 April 2012 | |
| 2012 | Nadamat | 2 January 2012 | 30 April 2012 | |
| 2012 | Mehar Bano aur Shah Bano | 4 January 2012 | 25 April 2012 | |
| 2012 | Yahan Pyar Nahin Hai | February 2012 | 2012 | |
| 2012 | Mata-e-Jaan Hai Tu | 2 March 2012 | 22 June 2012 | |
| 2012 | Durr-e-Shahwar | 10 March 2012 | 16 June 2012 | |
| 2012 | Bilqees Kaur | 15 April 2012 | 26 August 2012 | |
| 2012 | Maseeha | 8 May 2012 | 17 October 2012 | |
| 2012 | Meray Dard Ko Jo Zuban Miley | 23 June 2012 | 2012 | |
| 2012 | Shehr-e-Zaat | 29 June 2012 | 2 November 2012 | |
| 2012 | Madiha Maliha | 27 August 2012 | 2012 | |
| 2012 | Badi Aapa | 1 September 2012 | 17 February 2013 | |
| 2012 | Mohabbat Jaye Bhar Mein | 2 September 2012 | 2013 | |
| 2012 | Ek Tamanna Lahasil Si | 3 October 2012 | 2013 | |
| 2012 | Sitamgar | 18 October 2012 | 7 March 2013 | |
| 2012 | Na Kaho Tum Mere Nahi | 22 October 2012 | 4 March 2013 | |
| 2012 | Kahi Unkahi | 6 November 2012 | 9 April 2013 | |
| 2012 | Zindagi Gulzar Hai | 30 November 2012 | 24 May 2013 | |
| 2013 | Dil E Muztar | 23 February 2013 | 27 July 2013 | |
| 2013 | Humnasheen | 24 February 2013 | 2013 | |
| 2013 | Tanhai | 27 February 2013 | 10 July 2013 | |
| 2013 | Rehaai | 18 March 2013 | 24 June 2013 | |
| 2013 | Ullu Baraye Farokht Nahi | 30 April 2013 | 15 October 2013 | |
| 2013 | Kankar | 31 May 2013 | 6 December 2013 | |
| 2013 | Kadoorat | 17 July 2013 | 2013 | |
| 2013 | Mujhe Khuda Pe Yaqeen Hai | 13 August 2013 | 7 January 2014 | |
| 2013 | Khoya Khoya Chand | 15 August 2013 | 26 December 2013 | |
| 2013 | Aseerzadi | 17 August 2013 | 25 January 2014 | |
| 2013 | Rishtay Kuch Adhooray Se | 18 August 2013 | 29 December 2013 | |
| 2013 | Ishq Mein Teray | 27 November 2013 | 26 March 2014 | |
| 2013 | Mohabat Subh Ka Sitara Hai | 13 December 2013 | 16 May 2014 | |
| 2013 | Bunty I Love You | 29 December 2013 | 18 May 2014 | |
| 2014 | Ru Baru | 9 January 2014 | 2014 | |
| 2014 | Kissey Apna Kahein | 22 January 2014 | 20 June 2014 | |
| 2014 | Kahani Raima Aur Manahil Ki | 25 February 2014 | 20 August 2014 | |
| 2014 | Izteraab | 2 April 2014 | 27 August 2014 | |
| 2014 | Mithu Aur Aapa | 7 April 2014 | 16 November 2014 | |
| 2014 | Mere Meherbaan | 10 April 2014 | 17 November 2014 | |
| 2014 | Mausam | 23 May 2014 | 2014 | |
| 2014 | Aahista Aahista | 1 June 2014 | 28 September 2014 | |
| 2014 | Laa | 7 June 2014 | 30 August 2014 | |
| 2014 | Shanakht | 5 August 2014 | 16 December 2014 | |
| 2014 | Firaaq | 6 September 2014 | 28 December 2014 | |
| 2014 | Do Saal Ki Aurat | 1 October 2014 | 11 December 2014 | |
| 2014 | Digest Writer | 5 October 2014 | 14 March 2015 | |
| 2014 | Sadqay Tumhare | 10 October 2014 | 10 April 2015 | |
| 2014 | De Ijazat Jo Tu | 13 October 2014 | 18 December 2014 | |
| 2014 | Mehram | 29 November 2014 | 5 March 2015 | |
| 2014 | Zid | 23 December 2014 | 3 May 2015 | |
| 2015 | Nikah | 4 January 2015 | 14 June 2015 | |
| 2015 | Alvida | 11 February 2015 | 24 June 2015 | |
| 2015 | Dil Ka Kia Rung Karun | 1 March 2015 | 10 July 2015 | |
| 2015 | Aye Zindagi | 12 March 2015 | 12 August 2015 | |
| 2015 | Diyar-e-Dil | 17 March 2015 | 27 October 2015 | |
| 2015 | Jugnoo | 17 April 2015 | 14 August 2015 | |
| 2015 | Karb | 4 May 2015 | 12 October 2015 | |
| 2015 | Kitna Satatay Ho | 17 May 2015 | 22 November 2015 | |
| 2015 | Muqaddas | 25 May 2015 | 7 September 2015 | |
| 2015 | Mol | 30 May 2015 | 31 October 2015 | |
| 2015 | Sangat | 20 August 2015 | 4 February 2016 | |
| 2015 | Tumhare Siwa | 21 August 2015 | 15 January 2016 | |
| 2015 | Sawaab | 18 June 2015 | 17 July 2015 | |
| 2015 | Tum Mere Paas Raho | 22 July 2015 | 2 December 2015 | |
| 2015 | Mohabbat Aag Si | 22 July 2015 | 2 December 2015 | |
| 2015 | Tumhari Natasha | 24 July 2015 | 11 December 2015 | |
| 2015 | Kaisay Tum Se Kahoon | 26 July 2015 | 13 December 2015 | |
| 2015 | Aik Thi Misaal | 14 September 2015 | 12 January 2016 | |
| 2015 | Bin Roye | 2 October 2016 | 22 January 2017 | |
| 2015 | Maan | 19 October 2015 | 6 May 2016 | |
| 2015 | Sila | 28 October 2016 | 3 March 2017 | |
| 2015 | Sila-e-Mohabbat | 28 October 2016 | 3 March 2017 | |
| 2015 | Preet Na Kariyo Koi | 3 November 2015 | 8 March 2016 | |
| 2015 | Gul-e-Rana | 7 November 2015 | 2 April 2016 | |
| 2015 | Tere Mere Beech | 29 November 2015 | 29 May 2016 | |
| 2015 | Tere Baghair | 3 December 2015 | 28 January 2016 | |
| 2015 | Maana Ka Gharana | 9 December 2015 | 6 April 2016 | |
| 2015 | Sehra Main Safar | 18 December 2015 | 27 May 2016 | |
| 2015 | Abro | 20 December 2015 | 4 June 2016 | |
| 2016 | Lagaao | 18 January 2016 | 16 May 2016 | |
| 2016 | Mann Mayal | 25 January 2016 | 5 September 2016 | |
| 2016 | Kisay Chahoon | 3 February 2016 | 5 May 2016 | |
| 2016 | Pakeeza | 11 February 2016 | 25 August 2016 | |
| 2016 | Zara Yaad Kar | 15 March 2016 | 20 September 2016 | |
| 2016 | Udaari | 10 April 2016 | 25 September 2016 | |
| 2016 | Dil-e-Beqarar | 13 April 2016 | 3 August 2016 | |
| 2016 | Deewana | 11 May 2016 | 2 November 2016 | |
| 2016 | Jhoot | 13 May 2016 | 7 October 2016 | |
| 2016 | Khawab Sarae | 17 May 2016 | 26 September 2016 | |
| 2016 | Dharkan | 3 June 2016 | 21 October 2016 | |
| 2016 | Kathputli | 11 June 2016 | 23 October 2016 | |
| 2016 | Laaj | 23 July 2016 | 26 November 2016 | |
| 2016 | Saya-e-Dewar Bhi Nahi | 10 August 2016 | 22 February 2017 | |
| 2016 | Sang-e-Mar Mar | 1 September 2016 | 9 March 2017 | |
| 2016 | Sanam | 12 September 2016 | 6 February 2017 | |
| 2016 | Hatheli | 27 September 2016 | 19 January 2017 | |
| 2016 | Choti Si Zindagi | 27 September 2016 | 18 April 2017 | |
| 2016 | Dil Banjaara | 14 October 2016 | 31 March 2017 | |
| 2016 | Kuch Na Kaho | 31 October 2016 | 18 April 2017 | |
| 2016 | Natak | 3 December 2016 | 9 June 2017 | |
| 2017 | Woh Aik Pal | 2017 | 2017 | |
| 2017 | Nazr-e-Bad | 25 January 2017 | 8 June 2017 | |
| 2017 | Sammi | 29 January 2017 | 25 June 2017 | |
| 2017 | Yeh Raha Dil | 13 February 2017 | 21 August 2017 | |
| 2017 | Dil-e-Jaanam | 1 March 2017 | 21 July 2017 | |
| 2017 | Phir Wohi Mohabbat | 16 March 2017 | 10 August 2017 | |
| 2017 | Yaqeen Ka Safar | 19 April 2017 | 1 November 2017 | |
| 2017 | Mohabbat Khawab Safar | 24 April 2017 | 29 August 2017 | |
| 2017 | Alif Allah Aur Insaan | 25 April 2017 | 13 February 2018 | |
| 2017 | Adhi Gawahi | 5 July 2017 | 12 October 2017 | |
| 2017 | Tau Dil Ka Kia Hua | 2 July 2017 | 18 February 2018 | |
| 2017 | O Rangreza | 28 July 2017 | 23 February 2018 | |
| 2017 | Daldal | 17 August 2017 | 8 February 2018 | |
| 2017 | Pagli | 28 August 2017 | 22 January 2018 | |
| 2017 | Gumrah | 5 September 2017 | 2 January 2018 | |
| 2017 | Neelam Kinaray | 8 September 2017 | 15 December 2017 | |
| 2017 | Khamoshi | 23 September 2017 | 2 June 2018 | |
| 2017 | Main Maa Nahi Banna Chahti | 18 October 2017 | 15 February 2018 | |
| 2017 | Dar Jaati Hai Sila | 8 November 2017 | 25 April 2018 | |
| 2017 | Parchayee | 22 December 2017 | 13 July 2018 | |
| 2018 | De Ijazat | 8 January 2018 | 15 May 2018 | |
| 2018 | Mah-e-Tamaam | 29 January 2018 | 13 August 2018 | |
| 2018 | Tabeer | 20 February 2018 | 14 August 2018 | |
| 2018 | Teri Meri Kahani | 21 February 2018 | 21 June 2018 | |
| 2018 | Ishq Tamasha | 25 February 2018 | 16 September 2018 | |
| 2018 | Zun Mureed | 2 March 2018 | 8 September 2018 | |
| 2018 | Kaisi Aurat Ho Tum | 2 May 2018 | 24 October 2018 | |
| 2018 | Main Haar Nahi Manoun Gi | 19 June 2018 | 23 October 2018 | |
| 2018 | Main Khayal Hoon Kisi Aur Ka | 23 June 2018 | 5 December 2018 | |
| 2018 | Ki Jaana Main Kaun | 27 June 2018 | 22 November 2018 | |
| 2018 | Tawaan | 5 July 2018 | 6 February 2019 | |
| 2018 | Band Khirkiyan | 20 July 2018 | 22 February 2019 | |
| 2018 | Aatish | 20 August 2018 | 4 March 2019 | |
| 2018 | Lamhay | 28 August 2018 | 22 January 2019 | |
| 2018 | Baandi | 14 September 2018 | 3 May 2019 | |
| 2018 | Tajdeed e Wafa | 24 September 2018 | 10 April 2019 | |
| 2018 | Bisaat e Dil | 29 October 2018 | 26 February 2019 | |
| 2018 | Ranjha Ranjha Kardi | 3 November 2018 | 1 June 2019 | |
| 2018 | Aangan | 20 December 2018 | 27 June 2019 | |
| 2019 | Mere Humdam | 26 January 2019 | 9 July 2019 | |
| 2019 | Anaa | 17 February 2019 | 8 September 2019 | |
| 2019 | Jaal | 1 March 2019 | 11 October 2019 | |
| 2019 | Bharam | 4 March 2019 | 22 July 2019 | |
| 2019 | Inkaar | 11 March 2019 | 19 August 2019 | |
| 2019 | Meer Abru | 3 April 2019 | 7 August 2019 | |
| 2019 | Khaas | 17 April 2019 | 23 October 2019 | |
| 2019 | Deewar-e-Shab | 8 June 2019 | 21 March 2020 | |
| 2019 | Ishq Zahe Naseeb | 21 June 2019 | 17 January 2020 | |
| 2019 | Jo Tu Chahey | 4 July 2019 | 5 June 2020 | |
| 2019 | Mein Na Janoo | 16 July 2019 | 31 March 2020 | |
| 2019 | Naqab Zan | 23 July 2019 | 24 December 2019 | |
| 2019 | Malaal e Yaar | 8 August 2019 | 13 February 2020 | |
| 2019 | Daasi | 16 September 2019 | 13 April 2020 | |
| 2019 | Ehd-e-Wafa | 22 September 2019 | 15 March 2020 | |
| 2019 | Yeh Dil Mera | 30 October 2019 | 10 June 2020 | |
| 2019 | Tera Yahan Koi Nahin | 30 December 2019 | 30 June 2020 | |
| 2020 | Pyar Ke Sadqay | 23 January 2020 | 13 August 2020 | |
| 2020 | Dil Ruba | 28 March 2020 | 19 September 2020 | |
| 2020 | Sabaat | 29 March 2020 | 25 October 2020 | |
| 2020 | Tarap | 29 March 2020 | 25 October 2020 | |
| 2020 | Kashf | 7 April 2020 | 27 October 2020 | |
| 2020 | Tum Ho Wajah | 20 April 2020 | 13 November 2020 | |
| 2020 | Zebaish | 12 June 2020 | 18 December 2020 | |
| 2020 | Mohabbat Tujhe Alvida | 17 June 2020 | 13 January 2021 | |
| 2020 | Qurbatein | 6 July 2020 | 23 November 2020 | |
| 2020 | Rabba Mainu Maaf Kareen | 6 July 2020 | 23 November 2020 | |
| 2020 | Mushk | 17 August 2020 | 13 February 2021 | |
| 2020 | Saraab | 20 August 2020 | 11 March 2021 | |
| 2020 | Dulhan | 28 September 2020 | 29 March 2021 | |
| 2020 | Mohabbatain Chahatain | 3 November 2020 | 15 April 2021 | |
| 2020 | Qarar | 8 November 2020 | 9 May 2021 | |
| 2020 | Dil Tanha Tanha | 18 November 2020 | 1 April 2021 | |
| 2020 | Be Adab | 20 November 2020 | 9 April 2021 | |
| 2020 | Tum Se Kehna Tha | 24 November 2020 | 30 March 2021 | |
| 2020 | Raqs-e-Bismil | 25 December 2020 | 9 July 2021 | |
| 2021 | Raqeeb Se | 20 January 2021 | 26 May 2021 | |
| 2021 | Phaans | 20 February 2021 | 23 July 2021 | |
| 2021 | Safar Tamam Howa | 16 March 2021 | 7 September 2021 | |
| 2021 | Aakhir Kab Tak | 16 May 2021 | 20 December 2021 | |
| 2021 | Yun Tu Hai Pyar Bohut | 8 June 2021 | 29 October 2021 | |
| 2021 | Parizaad | 20 July 2021 | 1 February 2022 | |
| 2021 | Laapata | 28 July 2021 | 14 October 2021 | |
| 2021 | Hum Kahan Ke Sachay Thay | 1 August 2021 | 2 January 2022 | |
| 2021 | Qissa Meherbano Ka | 28 August 2021 | 26 February 2022 | |
| 2021 | Juda Huway Kuch Is Tarhan | 23 August 2021 | 8 October 2021 | |
| 2021 | Dobara | 20 October 2021 | 15 June 2022 | |
| 2021 | Ishq E Laa | 21 October 2021 | 2 June 2022 | |
| 2021 | Bebasi | 12 November 2021 | 3 June 2022 | |
| 2022 | Sang-e-Mah | 9 January 2022 | 3 July 2022 | |
| 2022 | Aitebaar | 24 January 2022 | 19 September 2022 | |
| 2022 | Ibn-e-Hawwa | 8 February 2022 | 20 August 2022 | |
| 2022 | Roag | 21 February 2022 | 26 April 2022 | |
| 2022 | Badshah Begum | 1 March 2022 | 18 October 2022 | |
| 2022 | Nehar | 9 May 2022 | 16 August 2022 | |
| 2022 | Zard Mausam | 3 May 2022 | 11 October 2022 | |
| 2022 | Pehchaan | 9 June 2022 | 2 September 2022 | |
| 2022 | Wehem | 22 June 2022 | 4 January 2023 | |
| 2022 | Bakhtawar | 17 July 2022 | 29 January 2023 | |
| 2022 | Wehshi | 29 August 2022 | 27 December 2022 | |
| 2022 | Wabaal | 3 September 2022 | 26 February 2023 | |
| 2022 | Meri Shehzadi | 22 September 2022 | 1 April 2023 | |
| 2022 | Tinkay Ka Sahara | 26 September 2022 | 3 April 2023 | |
| 2022 | Agar | 25 October 2022 | 30 May 2023 | |
| 2023 | Mere Ban Jao | 11 January 2023 | 30 August 2023 | |
| 2023 | Pyari Mona | 19 January 2023 | 6 July 2023 | |
| 2023 | Yunhi | 5 February 2023 | 1 October 2023 | |
| 2023 | Muhabbat Gumshuda Meri | 28 April 2023 | 27 October 2023 | |
| 2023 | Fareb | 7 May 2023 | 24 December 2024 | |
| 2023 | Neem | 5 June 2023 | 6 November 2023 | |
| 2023 | Jhok Sarkar | 6 June 2023 | 21 November 2023 | |
| 2023 | Ishq Murshid | 8 October 2023 | 5 May 2024 | |
| 2023 | Nijaat | 6 September 2023 | 17 April 2024 | |
| 2023 | Namak Haram | 3 November 2023 | 17 May 2024 | |
| 2023 | Rah-e-Junoon | 9 November 2023 | 23 May 2024 | |
| 2023 | Khushbo Mein Basay Khat | 28 November 2023 | 9 July 2024 | |
| 2023 | Takabbur | 31 December 2023 | 8 June 2024 | |
| 2024 | Jaan Se Pyara Juni | 24 April 2024 | 25 December 2024 | |
| 2024 | Aik Chubhan Si | 13 May 2024 | 23 December 2024 | |
| 2024 | Zard Patton Ka Bunn | 12 May 2024 | 27 October 2024 | |
| 2024 | Jafaa | 24 May 2024 | 27 December 2024 | |
| 2024 | Teri Chhaon Mein | 30 May 2024 | 28 November 2024 | |
| 2024 | Hum Dono | 23 July 2024 | 18 February 2025 | |
| 2024 | Qarz e Jaan | 17 November 2024 | 20 April 2025 | |
| 2024 | Zulm | 20 November 2024 | 6 May 2024 | |
| 2024 | Meem Se Mohabbat | 5 December 2024 | 10 April 2025 | |
| 2024 | Meri Tanhai | 30 December 2024 | 14 July 2025 | |
| 2025 | Hijr | 10 January 2025 | 27 June 2025 | |
| 2025 | Agar Tum Sath Ho | 25 February 2025 | 15 August 2025 | |
| 2025 | Ilzam e Ishq | 6 April 2025 | 2 November 2025 | |
| 2025 | Jama Taqseem | 10 September 2025 | 18 December 2025 | |
| Khwabon Mein Mili | 9 November 2025 | 15 February 2026 | | |
| 2026 | Daam-e-Mohabbat | 4 January 2026 | 2026 | |
| 2026 | Dekh Zara Pyar Se | 19 February 2026 | 19 March 2026 | |
| 2026 | Leader | March 2026 | 2026 | |

=== Daily series ===
| Name | First aired | Last aired | | | |
|---|---|---|---|---|---|
| Adhi Bewafayi | 31 January 2025 | 30 March 2025 | | | |
| Agar Tum Na Hotay | 4 August 2014 | 6 January 2015 | | | |
| Ahmed Habib Ki Betiyan | 12 December 2011 | 14 May 2012 | | | |
| Aik Larki Aam Si | 19 June 2018 | 1 February 2019 | | | |
| Akeli | 21 July 2015 | 5 November 2015 | | | |
| Bad Gumaan | 19 September 2016 | 3 February 2017 | | | |
| Badnaseeb | 15 November 2021 | 6 February 2022 | | | |
| Baityaan | 28 April 2009 | 1 July 2009 | | | |
| Be Aitbaar | 11 July 2016 | 7 December 2016 | | | |
| Bebaak | 8 December 2021 | 18 February 2022 | | | |
| Bepannah | 25 October 2022 | 15 January 2023 | | | |
| Beqadar | 7 February 2022 | 3 April 2022 | | | |
| Bhool | 13 January 2024 | 24 April 2024 | | | |
| Dagh-e-Dil | 22 May 2023 | 6 July 2023 | | | |
| Darbadar Tere Liye | 22 December 2014 | 18 January 2015 | | | |
| Dil, Diya, Dehleez | 2006 | 2007 | | | |
| Dil Ik Shehar e Junoon | 2 December 2024 | 5 February 2025 | | | |
| Dooriyan | 5 December 2023 | 20 April 2024 | | | |
| Fitna | 15 September 2023 | 13 November 2023 | | | |
| Gila | 5 December 2016 | 31 March 2017 | | | |
| Hasrat | 11 May 20222 | 18 August 2022 | | | |
| Haya Ke Daaman Main | 30 March 2016 | 16 September 2016 | | | |
| Hum Tehray Gunahgaar | 13 January 2014 | 24 April 2014 | | | |
| Ishq-e-Benaam | 9 November 2015 | 29 March 2016 | | | |
| Ishq Hamari Galiyon Mein | 12 August 2013 | 6 February 2014 | | | |
| Ishq Ibadat | 21 July 2015 | 31 October 2015 | | | |
| Jithani | 6 February 2017 | 16 June 2017 | | | |
| Khel | 7 July 2024 | 13 October 2024 | | | |
| Khwaab Ankhain Khwahish Chehre | 11 July 2011 | 2011 | | | |
| Log Kia Kahengay | 4 February 2019 | 5 July 2019 | | | |
| Manjhli | 11 June 2025 | 25 July 2025 | | | |
| Mar Jain Bhi To Kya | 1 October 2012 | 30 January 2013 | | | |
| Meesni | 16 January 2023 | 4 July 2023 | | | |
| Mein Hari Piya | 2018 | 2018 | | | |
| Mera Dard Na Janay Koi | 14 October 2015 | 18 February 2016 | | | |
| Meray Khwab Raiza Raiza | 2011 | 2012 | | | |
| Mere Khuda | 2 February 2015 | 20 May 2015 | | | |
| Mohabbat Reza Reza | 23 October 2024 | 30 January 2025 | | | |
| Mujhay Sandal Kar Do | 14 November 2011 | 16 July 2012 | | | |
| Nafrat | 12 January 2024 | 13 March 2024 | | | |
| Nikhar Gaye Gulab Sare | 15 May 2012 | 27 September 2012 | | | |
| Pehli Mohabbat | 3 April 2025 | 10 June 2025 | | | |
| Saiqa | 19 January 2009 | 27 May 2009 | | | |
| Sangsar | 3 April 2017 | 11 August 2017 | | | |
| Sanwari | 20 August 2018 | 3 May 2019 | | | |
| Susraal Mera | 15 September 2014 | 19 February 2015 | | | |
| Sultanat | 15 April 2024 | 6 July 2024 | | | |
| Tera Ghum Aur Hum | 1 July 2020 | 12 November 2020 | Tum Mere Kya Ho | 21 April 2024 | 19 July 2024 |
| Yaar Na Bichray | 17 May 2021 | 17 August 2021 | | | |
| Zindagi Tujh Ko Jiya | 22 February 2016 | 2 June 2016 | | | |

=== Horror and Supernatural series ===
| Name | First aired | Last aired | Ref |
|---|---|---|---|
| Belapur Ki Dayan | 15 February 2018 | 28 June 2018 | |
| Chalawa | 8 November 2020 | 4 April 2021 | |
| Mehboob Aapke Qadmon Main | 18 October 2019 | 7 August 2020 | |
| Woh | 2 September 2013 | 21 November 2014 | |

=== Miniseries ===
| Name | First aired | Last aired | Ref |
|---|---|---|---|
| Bhook | 10 May 2019 | 14 June 2019 | |
| Mann Jogi | 3 August 2024 | 28 September 2024 | |

=== Telefilms ===
| Name | Release date | Ref |
|---|---|---|
| 2 Batta 8 | 2021 | |
| Afrah Tafreeh | 2022 | |
| Bakra Impossible | 2019 | |
| Band Toh Baje Ga | 2018 | |
| Baanway Tiraanway Ki Shaadi | 2021 | |
| Behadd | 2013 | |
| Bholay Bhalay Sayan | 2021 | |
| Chal Dil Mere | 2022 | |
| Dildariyan | 2019 | |
| Dil Diyan Gallan | 2018 | |
| Dil Ke Chor | 2021 | |
| Dilnaz Naseeb Wali | 2019 | |
| Deewani | 2025 | |
| Ek Chance Pyar Ka | 2018 | |
| Gidh | 2014 | |
| Good Morning Sasu Maa | 2023 | |
| Hona Tha Pyar | 2022 | |
| Ishq For Sale | 2015 | |
| Iss Dil Ki Essi Ki Tessi | 2018 | |
| Janay Koun Thi Haseena | 2024 | |
| Jeena Hai Mushkil | 2023 | |
| Kahin Chand Na Sharma Jaye | 2013 | |
| Laddu Ki Lady | 2020 | |
| Left Right Left | 2017 | |
| Love You Dolly | 2025 | |
| Lucknow Wale Lateefullah | 2015 | |
| Lucky Kabootar | 2020 | |
| Made For China | 2022 | |
| Main Kukkoo Aur Woh | 2015 | |
| Mera Ishrat Meri Marzi | 2020 | |
| Mohabbat Youn Bhi Honi Thi | 2025 | |
| Mulazim Online | 2025 | |
| Mutthi Bhar Mitti | 2008 | |
| Nawab & Sons | 2021 | |
| Nelofar Tsunami | 2023 | |
| Piano Girl | 2016 | |
| Pinky Ka Dulha | 2019 | |
| Poppay Ki Wedding | 2024 | |
| Principal Nadra 19 Grade | 2021 | |
| Pyaar Kahani | 2019 | |
| Pyare Ko Pyar Nahi Mila | 2022 | |
| Rishta Baraye Farokht | 2017 | |
| Raja Ki Chandni | 2019 | |
| Saeedabad Ki Saeeda | 2022 | |
| Shadi Aur Tum Say? | 2010 | |
| Shaadi Ka Hero | 2022 | |
| Subah Be Daagh Hai | 2014 | |
| Tamak Toiyan | 2023 | |
| Thoora Jhoot Thoora Pyar | 2023 | |
| Tum Se Na Ho Paye Ga | 2024 | |
| V-Logger Da Viyah | 2025 | |
| Vespa Girl | 2019 | |
| Wo 7 Din | 2024 | |
| Yaqeen | 2012 | |

=== Reality shows ===
| Name | First aired | Last aired | Ref(s) |
|---|---|---|---|
| 60 Hours to Glory | 12 June 2021 | 6 September 2021 | |
| The After Moon Show | 10 February 2018 | 24 November 2018 | |
| Coke Studio Pakistan | 2011 | 2012 | |
| Jago Pakistan Jago | 18 January 2005 | 30 November 2018 | |
| Jeet Ka Dum | 7 February 2015 | 2016 | |
| Nescafe Basement | 8 September 2012 | 2013 | |
| Pepsi Battle of the Bands | July 2012 | August 2019 | |
| Tonite with HSY | 13 September 2014 | 7 October 2018 | |
| TUC The Lighter Side of Life | 14 December 2013 | 8 March 2014 | |
| Uth Records | 18 February 2011 | 2012 | |

=== Award shows ===
| Name | Ref |
|---|---|
| Hum Awards | |
| Hum Style Awards | |

=== Dubbed series ===
| Name | First aired | Last aired | Notes |
|---|---|---|---|
| C.I.D. | 18 January 2008 | 27 October 2018 | Indian series |
| Jhalak Dikhhla Jaa | 7 September 2006 | 6 March 2011 | Indian reality show |
| Sa Re Ga Ma Pa | 2000 | 2008 | Indian reality show |
| Simi Selects India's Most Desirable | 12 June 2011 | 6 November 2011 | Indian talk show |

== Production house ==
=== MD Productions ===
The network television serials are primarily produced under production company Momina Duraid Productions or MD Productions, owned by Momina Duraid wife of Siddiqui's youngest Son Duraid Qureshi and she is also a senior producer at channel.

=== Moomal Entertainment ===
The other Hum TV shows are being produced by Moomal Entertainment owned by Moomal Shunaid, wife of Siddiqui's eldest son Shunaid Siddiqui. Moomal Entertainment was founded in 2014.

== See also ==
- Hum Sitaray
- Hum Europe
- Hum Films
- Hum Award

== Other networks ==
- List of Pakistani television series
- List of television channels in Pakistan
- List of programs broadcast by ARY Digital
- List of programs broadcast by Geo Entertainment
