= Shazeal Shoukat =

Pakistani actress

- Born: Shazia Shoukat
- Occupations: Actress; Model
- Years active: 2019 – present

Shazeal Shoukat (née Shazia) is a Pakistani actress and model known for her roles in dramas Teri Rah Mein, Mann Aangan, Benaam, Adawat and Samjhota.

== Career ==
She made her acting debut in the drama Pakeeza Phuppo on ARY Digital, portraying the role of Maira. Then she appeared in drama Meri Mishaal on Aaj Entertainment in which she portrayed the role of Mishaal who falls in love with a famous actor. The following year in 2021 she appeared in drama Benaam as Laiba which was written by Seema Sheikh and Tahir Nazeer it aired on ARY Digital. In 2022 she appeared in drama Nisa and Dikhawa Season 3 on Geo Entertainment then she worked in drama Teri Rah Mein which was directed by Khurram Walter and written by Nadia Ahmed. She portrayed the role of Maha who is manipulated by her college friend. Then she starred along with Saba Qamar and Zahid Ahmed in the 2022 film Ghabrana Nahi Hai written by Mohsin Ali.

In 2023 she appeared in drama Mann Aangan as Ramsha. Later she appeared in drama Samjhota along with Adeel Chaudhry, Momina Iqbal, Sidra Niazi, Ali Ansari, Shaista Lodhi, Jawed Sheikh, Mirza Zain Baig and Saba Faisal which was written by Rukhsana Nigar it aired on ARY Digital. Then she worked in drama Adawat as Maria along with Fatima Effendi, Syed Jibran and Saad Qureshi.

== Filmography ==
=== Television ===
Year	Title	Role	Notes
2019	Pakeeza Phuppo	Maira	
2020	Meri Mishaal	Mishaal	
2020	Mazaaq Raat	Herself	
2021	Benaam	Laiba	
2021	Mazaaq Raat	Herself	
2022	Nisa	Hala	
2022	Dikhawa Season 3	Mahi	
2022	Teri Rah Mein	Maha	
2023	Mann Aangan	Ramsha	
2023	Samjhota	Shanzay	
2023	Adawat	Maria	
2024	Woh Ziddi Si	Ambreen	

=== Film ===
Year	Title	Role	Notes
2022	Ghabrana Nahi Hai	Secretary	
