= Roag =

Roag may refer to:

- Roag, Skye, a hamlet on the Isle of Skye, Scottish Highlands
- Roag (2011 TV series), a Pakistani television drama series
- Roag (2022 TV series), a Pakistani television drama series
