= Uraan (2020 TV series) =

2020 Pakistani television series

- Title screen
- اڑان
- Written by: Jahanzeb Qamar
- Directed by: Shaqielle Khan
- Starring: Kinza Hashmi; Adeel Chaudhry; Usama Khan; Aijaz Aslam; Farhan Ahmed Malhi
- Theme music composer: Mann Roya Re by Nabeel Shaukat Ali and Nirmal Roy
- Composer: Naved Naushad
- Country of origin: Pakistan
- Original language: Urdu
- No. of episodes: 45

Production
- Producers: Abdullah Kadwani; Asad Qureshi
- Production locations: Karachi, Pakistan
- Editors: Shahjahan Bilakhia (Jay); Rizwan Bilakhia; Kashif Raza
- Camera setup: Multi-camera setup
- Running time: 35–43 minutes
- Production company: 7th Sky Entertainment

Original release
- Network: Har Pal Geo
- Release: 31 August – 30 October 2020

Uraan is a Pakistani television series, produced by Abdullah Kadwani and Asad Qureshi under their production banner 7th Sky Entertainment. It features Kinza Hashmi and Adeel Chaudhry as lead along with Usama Khan, Aijaz Aslam, Farhan Ahmed Malhi, Rubina Ashraf, Zainab Qayyum and Nida Mumtaz in pivotal roles.

== Synopsis ==
Malika doesn’t want her life to be all about saving pennies. She and her brother, Aqeel, both wish to break free from the shackles of poverty and therefore, seek shortcuts for moneymaking. Malika begins to feel that her medium-waged fiancé is not worthy of her and she treats him badly once she gets the attention of an influential media person Atif Nawaz— only to realise that it was all a hoax and her actual well-wishers were those whom she had betrayed.

== Cast ==
- Kinza Hashmi as Malika; Sister of Aqeel and Manahil, Asim's fiance and love interest of Atif and Nooryan.
- Adeel Chaudhry as Asim; A simple and decent person, cousin of Malika, Aqeel and Manahil and Malika's fiancé.
- Aijaz Aslam as Atif Nawaz; A renowned actor who falls in love with Malika.
- Usama Khan as Nooryan; Love interest of Malika and only son of Baaji
- Rubina Ashraf as Baaji; Long-time servant of Atif and his family who has resided with him since the death of Atif's parents.
- Farhan Ahmed Malhi as Aqeel; Brother of Malika and Manahil and boyfriend of Zoya.
- Nida Mumtaz as Zahida; Mother of Malika, Aqeel and Manahil (Munni) and elder sister of Salma.
- Rimha Ahmed as Minahil (Munni); Youngest daughter of Zahida who is hard working.
- Lubna Aslam as Salma; Asim's mother and Zahida's sister.
- Zainab Qayyum as Zoha; Girlfriend of Aqeel.
- Danish Wakeel as Zaheer; Cousin of Zoha.
- Arez Ahmed as Waqas; Wealthy friend of Aqeel.
- Annie Zaidi as Sumaira; Waqas's mother
- Zohreh Ali as Navera; Cousin of Waqas
- Mahrukh Rizvi as Sana; office colleague of Asim
- Khaled Anam as Faizan
- Saba Khan
- Mubassira Khanum as Asim's grandmother.

== Production ==
=== Casting ===
In the first half of 2020, it was reported that Kinza Hashmi is going to appear in a serial produced by 7th Sky Entertainment. Later it was reported that Adeel Chaudhry will play the lead protagonist along with Usama Khan as parallel lead. Also, Aijaz Aslam said to join the cast as an antagonist. Farhan Malhi also joined the cast after the short break from television. He was last seen in Piya Naam Ka Diya, that also aired on Geo Entertainment. Senior actresses namely Nida Mumtaz, Rubina Ashraf and Zainab Qayyum were cast to portray supporting roles. It is the second appearance of Malhi and Chaudhry together after Hiddat.

=== Release ===
The first promo of the serial released on 20 August featuring Kinza, Adeel and Usama. The second promo released on 22 August featuring Kinza, Farhan and Nida, whereas the third teaser starring Kinza and Nida, released on 24 August on Geo Entertainment. On 25 August, it was announced that serial will be replacing Tamanna, airing from 31 August, Monday to Friday at 9:00 PM.

== Reception ==
The show was in talks even before its release due to its star-studded cast. The show did well on Trp charts at it respective time slot.
