= Nawal Saeed =

Pakistani actress

- Born: Nawal Saeed Ahmed; 30 October 1998 (age 28); Karachi, Pakistan
- Education: University of Karachi
- Occupations: Actress; Model
- Years active: 2017–present

Nawal Saeed (born 30 October 1998) is a Pakistani actor and model. She is known for her roles in dramas Aik Larki Aam Si, Yaqeen Ka Safar, Mah-e-Tamaam, Faryaad, Banno and Jaan-e-Jahan.

== Early life ==
Nawal was born in 1998 on 30 October in Karachi, Pakistan. She completed her studies and graduate from University of Karachi.

== Career ==
Saeed made her acting debut in 2017. She appeared in commercials before her acting career took off. She was noted for her roles in dramas Suno Na, Soteli Maamta and Bezuban with Usama Khan. She also appeared in dramas Yaqeen Ka Safar with Sajal Aly, Mah-e-Tamaam, Kabhi Band Kabhi Baja and Aik Larki Aam Si. Since then she appeared in dramas Dikhawa Season 2 and Makafaat Season 3. She also appeared in telefilm Bhabhi Nazar Laga Dengi along with Hina Dilpazeer, Behroze Sabzwari, Asma Abbas and Khaled Anam. In 2020 she appeared in drama Faryaad with Adeel Chaudhry and Zahid Ahmed.

== Filmography ==
=== Television ===
Year	Title	Role	Network
2017	Yaqeen Ka Safar	Misbah	Hum TV
2018	Mah-e-Tamaam	Ramla	Hum TV
2018	Aik Larki Aam Si	Nayab	Hum TV
2019	Bezuban	Noor	A-Plus
2019	Suno Na	Shanzay	Express Entertainment
2019	Mazaaq Raat	Herself	Dunya News
2020	Soteli Maamta	Minahil	Hum TV
2020	Mazaaq Raat	Herself	Dunya News
2020	Faryaad	Anum	ARY Digital
2021	Dikhawa Season 2	Saira	Geo Entertainment
2021	Oye Motti	Laila	Express Entertainment
2021	Makafaat Season 3	Shumaila	Geo Entertainment
2021	Sitam	Faria	Hum TV
2021	Banno	Sania	Geo Entertainment
2022	Mamlaat	Eshal	Geo TV
2022	Rasme-e-Ulfat	Tabinda	PTV
2022	Dil-e-Veeran	Minhal	ARY Digital
2022	Bikhray Hain Hum	Rumaisa Rehman (Rumi)	Hum TV
2023	Taaluq	Aima	Aaj Entertainment
2023	Dagh-e-Dil	Mahnoor	Hum TV
2023	Mein Kahani Hun	Navera	Express Entertainment
2023	Rang Badlay Zindagi	Maria	Hum TV
2023	Jaan-e-Jahan	Gulzaib Tabraiz Ali Shah	ARY Digital
2024	Habil Aur Qabil	Sobia	Geo Entertainment
2024	Shehzadi House	Shehzadi	Green Entertainment
2025	Mann Marzi	Zara	Geo Entertainment
2025	Kaarzar-e-Dua	Namal	Geo Entertainment
2026	Shaidai	Aeliya	Geo Entertainment
2026	Mere Pass Raho Tum	Meher	Express Entertainment

=== Telefilm ===
Year	Title	Role	Network
2020	Bhabhi Nazar Laga Dengi	Nazia	ARY Digital
2023	Hissay Ki Eid	Tarannum	PTV
2024	Nikammay	Shireen	Express Entertainment

=== Film ===
Year	Title	Role	Reference(s)
2022	Peechay Tou Dekho	Mumtaz	
2022	Muskan	Kiran	
2022	Chaudhry – The Martyr	Zoya	
