= Raqaas =

2026 Pakistani television series

- Genre: Psychological drama
- Written by: Radain Shah
- Directed by: Shahid Shafaat
- Starring: Danyal Zafar; Komal Meer
- Country of origin: Pakistan
- Original language: Urdu

Production
- Producer: Multiverse Entertainment

Original release
- Network: Green Entertainment
- Release: 7 September 2026

Raqaas is a 2026 Pakistani television drama series directed by Shahid Shafaat and written by Radain Shah. The series stars Danyal Zafar, Komal Meer, Hunain Shahid and Babar Ali. It premiered on Green Entertainment on 7 September 2026.

== Plot ==
The series follows Arooj, a young woman whose father, Dilawer Khan, expects her to pursue medicine rather than her interests in drawing and dancing. Her friendship with her cousin Fawad changes when she discovers that her father intends for them to marry. Meanwhile, a mysterious musician named Hamza moves into the neighbourhood and becomes an important presence in Arooj's life. The story also hints at a dark secret involving the family's past.

== Cast ==
- Danyal Zafar as Hamza
- Komal Meer as Arooj
- Hunain Shahid as Fawad
- Babar Ali as Dilawer Khan
- Farah Sadia as Nighat
- Shaina Hassan as Bano
- Koko-komal as Shagufta
- Marwa as young Arooj
- Hadi Abbas as young Fawad
- Karim Khan as Nawaz

== Reception ==
In its television review published on 13 September 2026, Dawn discussed the series' Gothic elements and its portrayal of a young woman whose artistic interests conflict with her conservative family's expectations. The review praised Komal Meer's performance and noted the contributions of Hunain Shahid and Danyal Zafar. It also highlighted the mystery surrounding the family's past.
