= Dhoka (TV series) =

2023 Pakistani television series

- Title screen
- Original title: دھوکہ
- Written by: Mehak Nawab
- Directed by: Kashif Saleem
- Starring: Affan Waheed; Sanam Jung; Agha Ali; Komal Meer
- Country of origin: Pakistan
- Original language: Urdu
- No. of seasons: 1
- No. of episodes: 34

Production
- Executive producers: Kashif Saleem; Amjad Arif
- Production locations: Karachi, Pakistan
- Camera setup: Multi-camera setup
- Running time: 35 minutes

Original release
- Network: ARY Digital
- Release: 7 November – 22 December 2023

Dhoka (Urdu: دھوکہ, lit. 'Betrayal') is a 2023 Pakistani television series written by Mehak Nawab, and directed by Kashif Saleem who co-produced it along with Amjad Arif. It originally aired on ARY Digital from 7 November to 22 December 2023.

== Premise ==
Hadi and Komal have been in love since childhood. However, Komal's mother doesn't let them marry. As Hadi is not as stable as she expects him to be. As the story build up Komal marries Ahmed, who later traps her based on lies.

== Cast ==
- Affan Waheed as Hadi; a mature, educated and sorted guy who wants to fight for his love. However, societal pressure does not let him take action in time.
- Sanam Jung as Kainat; Ahmed's first wife who is middle-class, mature, hard-working and independent but is stuck in an odd situation because of her husband.
- Agha Ali as Ahmed; a charming and clever guy who knows how to turn things in his favor, even if his actions hurt someone
- Komal Meer as Komal; a simple yet stubborn girl who wants her lover Hadi to fight for their marriage
- Sidra Niazi as Natasha; Hadi's friend
- Atiqa Odho as Ahmed's mother
- Shagufta Ejaz as Mehmooda; Hira and Komal's mother
- Javed Shaikh as Ali; Hira and Komal's father
- Ismat Zaidi as Hadi and Arsala's mother
- Nausheen Shah as Arsala; Hadi's sister
- Paras Masroor as Kami; Kainat's brother
- Maryam Fatima as Hira; Komal's sister
- Yasir Ali as Nabeel; Hira's husband
- Zara Ahmed as Sila; Ahmed's sister
- Seemi Pasha as Kainat's mother
- Khalifa Sajeeruddin as Ahmed's father

== Production ==
The serial was first announced in March 2022 by the director and producer, Kashif Saleem revealing Affan Waheed and Humaima Malik to be the main lead. The project was titled as "Ab Nahin Milenge Hum" but prior to its release it was changed to "Dhoka". However, later Malick was replaced by Jung. Agha Ali and Komal Meer joined the show as lead as well. Dhoka completed its shooting in May 2023. The serial started airing from 7 November, broadcasting episodes five days a week, Monday to Friday at 9:00 PM.
