= Joru Ka Ghulam (2014 TV series) =

- Starring: Nabeel; Shehnaz Pervaiz; Anam Tanveer; Naveed Raza; Mehmood Akhtar
- Opening theme: "Mein Hoon Joru Ka Ghulam"; Lyrics by Mehmood Akhtar
- Country of origin: Pakistan
- Original language: Urdu
- No. of episodes: 65

Production
- Producer: M.I.F Productions
- Running time: 15–20 minutes

Original release
- Network: Hum TV
- Release: 17 October 2014 – 29 May 2016

Joru Ka Ghulam (Eng: Wife's Slave) is a 2014 Pakistani television sitcom that premiered on Hum TV on 14 October 2014. It stars Nabeel of Bulbulay fame, along with Shehnaz Pervaiz, Anam Tanveer and Mehmood Akhtar.

== Summary ==
Each episode features a different scenario and some episodes are about the family of Nomi themselves, whereas others include guest appearances by other characters.

== Cast ==
- Nabeel Zafar as Nomi
- Anam Tanveer as Pinky
- Mehmood Akhtar as Choudhary Fateh Muhammad Malik
- Shehnaz Pervaiz as Reshma
- Naveed Raza as Bubloo
- Aiman Khan
