= Meray Dost Meray Yaar =

Pakistani television show

- Title screen for Season 1
- Genre: Mini Series; Friendship
- Written by: Ahmed Raza Firdousi; Shah Yasir
- Directed by: Murtaza Chaudhry; Mehreen Jabbar
- Starring: Asim Azhar; Hamza Tariq Jamil; Haroon Shahid; Syra Yousuf; Asad Siddiqui; Hania Aamir
- Theme music composer: Abbas Ali Khan; Asim Azhar
- Opening theme: Meray Dost Meray Yaar Chahe Ho Hum Mein Kitne Gile
- Country of origin: Pakistan
- Original language: Urdu
- No. of seasons: 2
- No. of episodes: 14

Production
- Executive producers: GroupM ESP (Hassaan Azher/GM ESP); (Agha Fasihullah/Director ESP)
- Producers: Syed Waqas Hasan Rizvi; Danish Khawaja & Shoaib Hussain
- Cinematography: Rana Kamran
- Camera setup: Multi-camera
- Running time: approx. 17 minutes
- Production company: GroupM ESP

Original release
- Network: Geo Entertainment; YouTube
- Release: 26 October 2019 – 28 November 2020

Meray Dost Meray Yaar (English: My Beloved, My Friend) is a Pakistan web television series premiered and has two seasons telecasted in the year 2019 and 2020 on Geo Entertainment and YouTube. It is co-produced by GroupM ESP and LU Pakistan. Both the seasons of this mini series is about the college students who are passionate about singing and music and want to make their career in the field of entertainment industry.

== Season 1 ==
The series is divided into 2 seasons and the first season primered on 26 October 2019. It has Asim Azhar, Syra Yousaf and Haroon Shahid in starring roles. The series is about college students and their love triangles. The story is about 4 college friends who are members of the Saaz band and split up for some reason. These friends meet again after years, where Zoya has become a popular singer and is getting married. Before her wedding, she wants to meet her college friends and contacts them one by one. After meeting, they decide to reconvene the band.

=== Cast ===
- Asim Azhar as Zain
- Haroon Shahid as Sherry
- Syra Yousuf as Zoya
- Hamza Tariq Jamil as Mohib
- Mariam Mirza as Zoya's mother
- Mehmood Aslam as Uncle Sam
- Hassan Jahangir as Saleem bhai
- Bilal Saeed
- Sara Gilani
- Shafqat Khan

== Season 2 ==
The journey of Saaz band continues, this time in a new city with new faces. This season stars Asim Azhar, Hania Aamir, Hamza Tariq Jamil and Asad Siddiqui in lead roles. The second season directed by Mehreen Jabbar premiered on 18 October 2020 with a total of 7 episodes. This season shows the dilemma of the college students, love triangle. It also shows how to manage the situations and bring a change in one's life, when it becomes difficult to cope with the situations. When things don't work out as planned, how to let go of something.

=== Cast ===
- Hania Aamir as Zoya
- Asim Azhar as Zain
- Asad Siddiqui as Sherry
- Hamza Tariq Jamil as Mohib
- Mariyam Nafees as Feeha
- Usama Khan as Harris
- Ali Hamza as Professor Hassan
- Sabeena Syed as Maheen
- Behroze Sabzwari as Zain's father
- Marina Khan as Zoya's mother
- Tanveer Jamal as Zoya's father
- Zia Azam as Sherry's father
- Farista as Sherry's mother
