= Wehshi =

Novel by Razia Butt

- Author: Razia Butt
- Original title: وحشی
- Language: Urdu
- Genre: Novel
- Publication place: Pakistan
- Media type: Print (paperback)

Wehshi is an Urdu novel by Pakistani author Razia Butt. The novel revolves around the dysfunctional relationship of a young boy with his mother and stepfather. The novel has been adapted into a film in 1972 and a TV series in 2022.

== Synopsis ==
The novel talks about the effects of childhood deprivations, abuse and toxic environment on one's life. It is about a young boy and his traumatised life who becomes so when his mother marries for a second time after his father's death. His stepfather too tortures him mentally, leading to a worsening of his mental state.

== Adaptation ==
- The novel was adapted into a film Pyasa (1972) which was directed by Hassan Tariq.
- Wehshi, a television series based on the novel, directed by Iqbal Hussain is airing on Hum TV in 2022.
