= Sahar Hashmi =

Pakistani actress

- Born: March 9, 1992 (age 34); Lahore, Pakistan
- Occupation: Actress
- Years active: 2006–present
- Known for: Mann Mast Malang (2025); Shaidai (2026)

Sahar Hashmi is a Pakistani television actress. She made her acting debut with Zulm (2023) for which she won Hum Award for Best New Sensation Female. Her performance in Mann Mast Malang, in which she played Riya opposite Danish Taimoor, brought her wider recognition. She later appeared in the television serials Shaidai and Zanjeerain.

== Career ==
Hashmi made her acting debut with the leading role of Esha in the drama serial Zulm. In 2024, Hashmi appeared in the television drama Ishq Hua. She played another leading role in the 2024 drama Shadi Card. In 2025, she played the lead role in Mann Mast Malang. She also played the lead role in the 2026 television series Shaidai.

== Filmography ==
=== Television ===
Year	Title	Role	Notes	Ref
2006	Shaadi Karke Phas Gaya Yaar	Ayaan's Nanny		
2023	Zulm	Esha		
2024	Ishq Hua	Rukhsar		
2025	Mann Mast Malang	Riya Khan		
2026	Shaidai	Miraal Ahmed		
2026	Zanjeerain	Shehar Bano		
2026	Dar-e-Nijaat	Young Khushbakht Qudrat / Bella		

=== Telefilms ===
Year	Title	Role	Ref(s)
2024	Tere Naam Ka Tattoo	Ramsha	
2024	Shadi Card	Sitara	
2025	Saiyyan Thanedaar	Filza	
2025	Deewani	Mariyam	
2025	Viral Abba	Mahnoor	
2025	Ye Bahu Nahi Chalegi	Sara	
2025	Ghost Meri Dost	Laiba	
2026	London Wala Dulha		

== Awards and nominations ==
Year	Award	Category	Work	Result	Ref(s)
2025	10th Hum Awards	Best New Sensation – Female	Zulm	Won	
2025	24th Lux Style Awards	Emerging Talent of the Year	Zulm	Nominated	
