= Shaidai =

2026 Pakistani television series

- Genre: Drama; Romance
- Written by: Saqlain Abbas
- Directed by: Ali Faizan
- Starring: Feroze Khan; Sahar Hashmi; Bushra Ansari; Nawal Saeed
- Country of origin: Pakistan
- Original language: Urdu
- No. of seasons: 1
- No. of episodes: 30

Production
- Executive producer: Asad Qureshi
- Producer: Abdullah Kadwani
- Production locations: Karachi, Pakistan
- Camera setup: Multi-camera setup
- Running time: 35 minutes
- Production company: 7th Sky Entertainment

Original release
- Network: Geo Entertainment
- Release: 22 April – 30 July 2026

Shaidai is a 2026 Pakistani romantic television series produced by Abdullah Kadwani and Asad Qureshi under the banner of 7th Sky Entertainment. Written by Saqlain Abbas and directed by Ali Faizan, the series stars Feroze Khan and Sahar Hashmi in the lead roles, alongside Bushra Ansari, Nawal Saeed, Mahmood Aslam, Tauseeq Haider and Zainab Qayyum.

The series premiered on 22 April 2026 on Geo Entertainment. The drama centres on Ali Khan, a wealthy businessman, and Miral, an independent young woman, whose relationship is complicated by family conflicts and past grievances.

In July 2026, Geo Entertainment reported that drama serial Shaidai has surpassed one billion views on YouTube, following the conclusion of its 30-episode run.

== Plot ==
Ali Khan stands at the top of the business world, driven and determined to remain in control. Miraal, an independent and sharp-tongued woman, refuses to depend on anyone and works to make her own way. Ali Khan meets Miraal for the first time when she arrives at his company for an interview. He hides his identity, while Miraal believes he is an ordinary candidate, unaware that he is a well-known business tycoon. Ali Khan intervenes when a hostile tenant harasses Miraal's family, leading to a violent clash in her neighbourhood. He protects her but is arrested along with his driver. Ali Khan uses his influence to secure bail, impressing Miraal and becoming involved in her business. Meanwhile, a confession reveals Malik Hashmat's crime, and Aeliya's desire for revenge against Ali grows. Ali Khan secretly uses his resources to help Miraal secure her first major contract while continuing to hide his identity. Meanwhile, Aeliya keeps watch on him and vows to take away everything he owns and loves. Ali Khan violently protects Miraal from harassers, but his growing conflict with his rivals soon draws him back into his own troubles. He unknowingly misbehaves with Miraal, leaving her angry with him. Ali Khan tries to make amends and goes to great lengths to earn Miraal's forgiveness. His efforts bring them closer. Miraal secures her first major contract with Ali Khan's help, but their celebration is interrupted when a businessman threatens to expose Ali's identity. Ali Khan continues hiding his identity as Miraal's business grows and plans to reveal the truth to her. Meanwhile, his rivals begin plotting against Miraal. Ali Khan prepares to reveal his identity to Miraal, but learns a secret about her father that stops him. Meanwhile, Dadi Jaan becomes suspicious of Miraal's connection to her. Miraal's world is shattered when her father dies in a fatal accident during their anniversary celebration. Ali Khan comforts her, while the tragedy strengthens Dadi Jaan's suspicions.

Ali Khan has to leave for London because of work commitments, leaving Miraal heartbroken. She takes responsibility for the business and finds the strength to move forward. After twenty-five years, Dadi Jaan visits her daughter Atiya and reveals Ali Khan's identity and his love for Miraal. Fearing the truth will hurt her daughter, Atiya refuses to listen, while Miraal and Ali remain unaware. Atiya tries to separate Miraal from Ali Khan by introducing a marriage proposal. Miraal becomes conflicted between her mother's wishes and her feelings for Ali. As marriage discussions begin, Miraal hopes Ali Khan will understand her feelings, but he remains unaware of them. Meanwhile, Dadi Jaan tries to change Atiya's mind but fails. Miraal agrees to the marriage to fulfil Atiya's wishes. Ali Khan returns by flight and rushes to stop the wedding. Acting on Aeliya's instructions, Adil refuses to marry Miraal and reveals Atiya's identity. Ali Khan arrives just as the wedding is about to take place. Aeliya meets the grieving Miraal and raises doubts about her parents' sudden deaths. Meanwhile, Ali Khan catches Adil trying to flee the country and discovers Aeliya's involvement. Ali Khan rushes to protect Miraal, unaware that Aeliya has turned her against him by twisting the truth and blaming him for her parents' deaths. While Miraal grieves, Aeliya continues manipulating her. Miraal unexpectedly arrives at Ali Khan's house and asks him to marry her.

Miraal's hatred for Ali Khan deepens despite the truth coming out. Ali tries to regain her trust, but she refuses to accept him as their married life begins. After finding a letter from Atiya revealing her family's cruel treatment of her love marriage, Miraal rejects Ali Khan and Dadi Jaan's attempts to reach her. She vows to avenge her parents' suffering. After her plans fail, Miraal invites Aeliya to her house as a friend. Although Ali Khan and Dadi Jaan suspect Aeliya's intentions, Miraal joins hands with her to destroy them. Aeliya takes advantage of Ali Khan's weakness and manipulates Miraal into stealing his mother's property documents. She also involves Shahroz to feed Miraal more lies. Miraal hands the factory documents to Aeliya, leading to a court notice against Ali Khan. She confronts Ali with Aeliya's biggest lie and accuses him of murdering her parents. Aeliya convinces Miraal that Ali Khan and Dadi Jaan were responsible for her parents' deaths. Meanwhile, Dadi Jaan transfers all her property to Miraal's name. After exposing the truth about his parents' murder, Ali Khan turns against Miraal, believing she has sided with his enemies. He has her locked up. Miraal survives a devastating fire after Ali Khan risks his life to rescue her. Meanwhile, Aeliya becomes worried about Mohammad Yaar's sudden disappearance. After learning the truth, Miraal reconciles with Ali Khan and confronts Aeliya to end their feud. However, Aeliya betrays her and orders her guards to capture Miraal. Aeliya holds Miraal captive and reveals her plan. Ali Khan rescues Miraal, defeats Aeliya and brings their conflict to an end.

== Cast ==
- Feroze Khan as Ali Khan
- Sahar Hashmi as Miral
- Bushra Ansari as Dadi Jaan
- Mahmood Aslam as Malik Hashmat
- Nawal Saeed as Aeliya
- Tauseeq Haider as Ahmed
- Zainab Qayyum as Atiya

== Reception ==
In May 2026, Sadaf Haider of Dawn described the production as well made and noted the chemistry between the lead actors.

In July 2026, Dawn's television review discussed the developments in the storyline and performances of the cast, particularly those of Feroze Khan and Sahar Hashmi.
