= Tum Se Kehna Tha =

Entertainment TV show

- Genre: Romance; Drama
- Written by: Jahanzeb Qamar
- Directed by: Fahim Burney
- Starring: Kinza Hashmi; Azfar Rehman; Areej Mohyudin
- Theme music composer: Ali Haider
- Opening theme: "Tum Se Kehna Tha" by Ali Haider
- Country of origin: Pakistan
- Original language: Urdu

Production
- Executive producer: Momina Duraid
- Producer: Momina Duraid
- Running time: 40 minutes approx.
- Production companies: MD Productions; ANF Productions

Original release
- Release: 24 November 2020 – 30 March 2021

Tum Se Kehna Tha (Urdu: تم سے کہنا تھا, lit. 'I needed to tell you') is a 2020 Pakistani television romantic drama series co-produced by Momina Duraid under the banner of MD Productions. It features Kinza Hashmi, Azfar Rehman and Areej Mohyudin in leading roles with Raeed Muhammad Alam, Laila Zuberi, Nadia Afgan and Munazzah Arif in the supporting cast. It first aired on Hum TV on 24 November 2020.

== Plot summary ==
The plot ased on a movie named "While you were sleeping". The drama focus on a girl who has a secret crush on a guy who was beaten by thugs, and she helped him calling help and cared in hospital, every one assumed she is his fiance.

== Cast ==
- Kinza Hashmi as Yusra
- Azfar Rehman as Faris
- Areej Mohyudin as Rabi
- Raeed Muhammad Alam as Yasir
- Munazzah Arif as Zeenat; Yusra and Rabi's mother
- Khalid Butt as Yusra and Rabi's father
- Laila Zuberi as Yasir's mother
- Mariam Mirza as Samina; Faris's mother
- Nadia Afgan as Saba Chaudhary
- Subhan Awan as Saim
- Zainab Raza as Haya
