= Tinkay Ka Sahara =

Pakistani television series

- Urdu: تنکے کا سہارا
- Written by: Zanjabeel Asim Shah
- Directed by: Zeeshan Ahmed
- Starring: Sonya Hussyn; Haroon Shahid; Sami Khan; Rabab Hashim
- Country of origin: Pakistan
- Original language: Urdu
- No. of episodes: 28

Production
- Executive producer: Moomal Shunaid
- Production company: Moomal Entertainment

Original release
- Network: Hum TV
- Release: 26 September 2022 – 3 April 2023

Tinkay Ka Sahara (transl. Clutching at a Straw) is a Pakistani television series which was first broadcast on Hum TV on 26 September 2022. It is written by Zanjabeel Asim Shah and directed by Zeeshan Ahmed. The series stars Sonya Hussyn, Sami Khan, Haroon Shahid and Rabab Hashim.

== Plot ==
Qadar is an orphan who lives with her married sister, Romana. Romana's mother-in-law considers her a burden on the family. With the help of a matchmaker, she is married off to Hammad. After they are married, Qadar realizes Hammad is an unemployed, unmotivated and lazy person. Hammad is affectionate towards Qadar but due to his unemployment, his family has a disparaging attitude towards them both. To help him, Qadar creates a catering business. Their business does well, and gradually Hammad starts becoming a more responsible and hardworking person. His relationship improves with his own family and he attributes his personal growth to his wife. He gains his family's respect; meanwhile his sister-in-law envies their financial success.

Durriya is an only child, belonging to a working-class family. She dreams of marrying a rich man with a lavish lifestyle. She receives the proposal of Wasay Ahmed who is a rich self-made businessman. Wasay's parents died when he was young and he was raised by his sister Adeela who is married but has no children of her own. Durriya's parents are concerned by Wasay and his sister Adeela's arrogant and egotistical behaviour after meeting them, and try to talk Durriya out of this marriage. Durriya is adamant about marrying Wasay, even when her parents tell her they don't think he is a good match for her. They are also concerned that he seems to be temperamental, but she reassures them that she will handle any situation that arises, and won't bring her problems to them. Once she marries him, he gets angry and hits her on their wedding night. He often verbally and physically abuses her then tries to make up for it with expensive gifts. She realizes he has a quick temper and a volatile personality. His sister refuses to acknowledge his anger and does not think he needs any mental help. Adeela further enables his behaviour by painting Durriya in a bad picture in front of him.

== Cast ==
- Sonya Hussyn as Qadar
- Haroon Shahid as Hammad
- Sami Khan as Vasay
- Rabab Hashim as Duriya
- Saba Faisal as Hammad's mother
- Ayesha Toor as Adeela
- Subhan Awan as Salman
- Adnan Jaffar as Imran
- Sana Askari as Aimen
- Naveed Raza as Sajjad
- Salma Asim as Duriya's mother
- Akbar Islam as Duriya's father
- Afsheen Hayat as Romana

== Production ==
In September 2021, in an interview with an online portal screenwriter Zanjabeel Asim Shah revealed the title of one of her upcoming projects, Tinkay Ka Sahara. The principal photography began in August 2022. The first teaser of the series was released on 3 September 2022.

== Reception ==
The show received positive reviews right from the beginning. Sonia Hussain and Haroon Shahid were praised for their performances. It received high views on YouTube and good ratings on TV. The first episode got 4.2 TRPs, 2nd episode got 4.4 TRPs and the 3rd episode got 6.3 TRPs. The ratings further increased as the fourth and fifth episodes fetched 5.6 and 5.5 TRPs. The twist in the 7th episode made the show receive 6.1 TRPs. And the next episode again got good ratings of 6.9 TRPs. The ninth episode received ratings of 5.9 TRPs. 10th episode received 5.9 TRPs.
