= Meri Mishaal =

Pakistani television series

- Genre: Romantic drama
- Written by: M Hassan Khan
- Directed by: Rao Ayaz Shahzad
- Starring: Shazeal Shoukat; Hamza Tariq Jamil; Arman Ali Pasha
- Country of origin: Pakistan
- Original language: Urdu
- No. of episodes: 26

Production
- Producers: Hashim Iftikhar and Faheem Fredrick Inayat
- Cinematography: Fayyaz Khan Lodi
- Camera setup: Single-camera setup
- Production company: Asbestos Productions

Original release
- Network: Aaj Entertainment
- Release: 20 June 2020

Meri Mishaal (Urdu: میری مشال) is a 2020 Pakistani romantic drama television series premiered on Aaj Entertainment on 20 June 2020. It stars Shazeal Shoukat, Hamza Tariq Jamil and Arman Ali Pasha in leads.

== Plot ==
It is the story of a young woman, Mishaal, who falls in love with a famous actor, Mahir Khan. Her love and dream of marrying Mahir motivates her to pursue a job in media, all the while knowing it's a dream that can never come true because she belongs to a middle-class family. She later unwillingly marries Adeen.

== Cast ==
- Shazeal Shoukat as Mishaal
- Hamza Tariq Jamil as Adeen
- Arman Ali Pasha as Mahir Khan
- Aliya Habib as Ghazala; Mishaal's mother
- Shazia Qaiser as Tarannum Aapa
- Abeer Qureshi as Hooriya
