= Hiddat =

2017 Pakistani television serial

- Left to right: Arij Fatyma, Saniya Shamshad, Farhan Ahmed Malhi, Adeel Chaudhary
- Genre: Romantic drama
- Written by: Samra Bukhari
- Directed by: Ahmed Kamran
- Starring: Arij Fatyma; Adeel Chaudhary; Saniya Shamshad; Farhan Ahmed Malhi; Mariya Khan
- Opening theme: "Ye Kesa Likha Re Naseeba" by Rosemerry and Faakhir Mehmood
- Original language: Urdu
- Original title: ur
- No. of episodes: 29

Production
- Running time: 35–38min
- Production company: 7th Sky Entertainment

Original release
- Network: Geo Entertainment
- Release: 12 April – 31 August 2017

Hiddat (Urdu: حدت, lit. 'Intensity') is a 2017 Pakistani television romantic drama serial aired on GEO TV, written by Samra Bukhari. Directed by Ahmed Kamran, it was produced by Abdullah Kadwani and Asad Qureshi under the 7th Sky Entertainment banner. The serial stars Arij Fatyma, Adeel Chaudhry, Farhan Malhi and Seemi Pasha.

== Synopsis ==
A romantic-at-heart Nimra (Arij Fatyma) has a carefree home life. Her engagement to Adnan (Adeel Chaudhry) however feels like an end to all exciting possibilities, until she meets the free-spirited Farhad (Farhan Malhi). Farhad is the cousin of her friend, Afsheen.

With a wild attempt to escape from the shackles of her home, Nimra runs away from home to live with Farhad. Adnan ties the knot with Nimra's younger sister Aqsa (Saniya Shamshad) to take revenge from his ex-fiancé.

Unfortunately, Nimra is met with rejection from Farhad's family. Her impulsive decision leaves her at the mercy of her sister-in-law, Aqeela's widower Uncle's place.

Will Nimra ever find her way back to peace? Or will one reckless decision shape her entire destiny?

== Cast ==
- Arij Fatyma As Nimra
- Adeel Chaudhry As Adnan
- Saniya Shamshad As Aqsa
- Farhan Ahmed Malhi As Farhad
- Anum Tanveer As Aqeela
- Seemi Pasha As Azra
- Mariya Khan As Asma
- Faryal Mehmood As Seema
- Rashid Farooqui As Shabbir
- Saleem Mairaj As Qurban
- Humaira Zaheer As Kulsoom
- Taifoor As Saad
- Birjees Farooqui As Farhad's mother

== Soundtrack ==
The original soundtrack of "Hiddat" is composed and sung by Faakhir Mehmood and Rose Merry. The lyrics are penned down by S.K Khalish.
