= Badzaat =

- Written by: Misbah Nosheen
- Directed by: Siraj-ul-Haque
- Country of origin: Pakistan
- Original language: Urdu
- No. of episodes: 44

Production
- Producers: Abdullah Kadwani; Asad Qureshi
- Production company: 7th Sky Entertainment

Original release
- Network: Har Pal Geo
- Release: 2 March – 4 August 2022

Badzaat (lit:low-born) is a Pakistani romantic drama television series produced by Abdullah Kadwani and Asad Qureshi under their banner 7th Sky Entertainment. It first aired on Har Pal Geo, from 2 March to 4 August 2022. It is written by Misbah Nosheen and directed by Siraj-ul-Haque. The series stars Imran Ashraf and Urwa Hocane in leading roles with the supporting cast of Ali Abbas, Saba Faisal, Mehmood Aslam, Zainab Qayyum, Zoya Nasir, Nida Mumtaz and Sidra Niazi.

== Cast ==
- Imran Ashraf as Wali Asfandali, Laila Begum's biological son who is raised by Mehwish Begum, his father's second wife as her own child. He is an impulsive young man with a heart of gold. Later Anabiya's husband
- Urwa Hocane as Anabiya wife of Daniyal, a distant relative of Wali and Danyal. She is also Wali's love interest and later becomes his wife.
- Ali Abbas as Daniyal Akber Hussain, ex-husband of Anabiya who is dating Huda and Annie. A man of loose character who has a lot of spite for Wali because of his success. (Dead)
- Saba Faisal as Laila Begum, Wali's biological mother who was a tawaif by profession.
- Nida Mumtaz as Narmeem Begum, Daniyal's mother and Wali's aunt. She is as evil as her son.
- Mehmood Aslam as Akber Hussain, Daniyal's father and Wali's paternal uncle.
- Zainab Qayyum as Mehrunisa Begum, Anabia's mother. (Dead)
- Zoya Nasir as Annie Khan, Wali younger step-sister who is dating Daniyal
- Sidra Niazi as Qandeel Akber Hussain & Qandeel Kashif, Daniyal's sister and Wali's cousin.
- Zohreh Amir as Huda
- Sajida Syed as Mehwish Begum, Wali's adoptive mother. She loves and cares for Wali like her own child.
- Danial Afzal Khan as Kashif; Qandeel's husband
- Birjees Farooqui as Fariha Begum, Palwasha's mother.
