= Qalandar (TV series) =

Pakistani television series

- Title screen
- Urdu: قلندر
- Developed by: Mikaal Zulfiqar
- Written by: Samra Bukhari
- Directed by: Saima Waseem
- Starring: Komal Meer; Muneeb Butt; Ali Abbas; Kinza Razzak; Hiba Aziz
- Country of origin: Pakistan
- Original language: Urdu
- No. of episodes: 60

Production
- Production company: 7th Sky Entertainment

Original release
- Network: Geo Entertainment
- Release: October 14, 2022 – 23 April 2023

Qalandar is a Pakistani television series first broadcast on Geo Entertainment on 14 October 2022. It is written by Samra Bukhari and produced by Abdullah Kadwani and Asad Qureshi under the banner of 7th Sky Entertainment, with Mikaal Zulfiqar as developer. The cast of the series includes Komal Meer, Muneeb Butt, Ali Abbas, Hiba Aziz, Asma Abbas and Kinza Razzak.

== Cast ==
- Komal Meer as Durr-e-Adan
- Muneeb Butt as Tabrez
- Ali Abbas as Irfan
- Kinza Razzak as Shafaq
- Hiba Aziz as Sumbul
- Asma Abbas as Safia
- Noor ul Hassan as Ayub
- Usman Chaudhry as Haneef
- Naima Khan as Qudsia
- Kinza Malik as Rahat
- Ali Tahir as Ehsaan
- Sadoon Ali as Nomi
- Hamna Amir as Sheena
- Fajar Khan as Ahmed abba
- as Tanveer
- Kashif Mehmood as Safia's husband

== Soundtrack ==
The original soundtrack of the series is performed by Rahat Fateh Ali Khan, with music composition by Shani Arshad with the lyrics of Sabir Zafar.

== Production ==
On 4 October 2022, in a conversation with DAWN Images, Butt explained his and Meer's roles, and revealed that the story revolves around three to four characters and the essence of the story is faith of Allah.
