= Ahmad Taha Ghani =

Pakistani actor and musician

- Born: 28 July 1990 (age 35); Islamabad, Pakistan
- Occupations: Actor; singer; model
- Years active: 2013–present
- Father: Lt. Gen. Sajjad Ghani Retd.

Ahmad Taha Ghani is a Pakistani actor, singer and model. He appeared in acclaimed television serials such as Parizaad and Jo Tu Chahey. He made his film debut with Hassan Rana's 2017 war-epic Yalghaar.

== Family and education ==
Coming from a family with an army background, he is the youngest of three siblings, with a brother and a sister. He has earned a Bachelors in Finance and Management from Australia.

== Filmography ==
=== Television serials ===
Year	Title	Role	Channel	Notes
2013	Jaan Hatheli Par	Behram	Urdu 1	
2019	Jo Tu Chahey	Armaan Ubaid	Hum TV	
2020	Qurbatain	Rohaan	Hum TV	
2021	Parizaad	Majid	Hum TV	
2021	Ishq E Laa	Zain	Hum TV	
2023	Meesni	Daniyal	Hum TV	
2023	Rafta Rafta	Shaan	Green Entertainment	
2023	Nauroz	Salar	Green Entertainment	
2025	Adhi Bewafayi	Nabeel	Hum TV	

=== Telefilm ===
Year	Title	Role
2024	Nauroz	Salar

=== Film ===
Year	Title	Role	Notes
2017	Yalghaar	Capt. Asif	Film debut
2022	The Haris Rauf Story	Haris Rauf	Short
2023	Ehsaas	Zain	Short

== Discography ==
Year	Title	Notes
2017	Hasoun Main	Music video; featuring Ghani alongside Uzma Khan
2021	Tu Mil Jaye Tou	Music video
