= Wehshi (TV series) =

2022 Pakistani television series

- Original title: وحشی
- Based on: Wehshi by Razia Butt
- Written by: Shumaila Zaidi
- Starring: Khushhal Khan; Komal Meer; Subhan Awan
- Country of origin: Pakistan
- Original language: Urdu
- No. of episodes: 36

Production
- Executive producer: Momina Duraid
- Producer: Momina Duraid
- Production company: MD Productions

Original release
- Network: Hum TV
- Release: 29 August – 27 December 2022

Wehshi (Urdu: وحشی, lit. 'Wild') is a 2022 Pakistani television series based on the novel of the same name by Razia Butt. It is produced by Momina Duraid under the banner MD Productions and directed by Iqbal Hussain. The series stars Khushhal Khan, Komal Meer, Subhan Awan, Nadia Khan, and Babar Ali in leading roles. The series revolves around a parental orphan whose deprivations in life make him wild, as labelled by others. Wehshi broadcast on Hum TV from 29 August 2022 to 27 December 2022.

== Plot ==
Sobia and Asif's fathers died on the same day during their childhood. While Sobia's father mistreated his second daughter for being a girl, Asif was dearly loved by his father, being his only son. The lives of the two children take particularly drastic turns externally as well as internally. Asif's mother remarries for financial support of her son and endows herself in care of Asif's foster brother, Amir.

Few years pass and it’s shown that Asif has become a wild man who rebels against his step-father and keeps to himself due to mistreatment and absence of love by others in life, while Sobia becomes a selfish girl who values her own life above everything else and is happier after her father's death. Amir is sent abroad by his father for higher studies to make Asif jealous. Sobia starts staying with her uncle Majid, as his house isn’t far from her medical college. There, she meets Asif. Asif dislikes Sobia as he believes she took his opportunity for him to pursue higher studies like Amir. Asif starts to fall in love with Sobia when he dreams about her comforting him during a panic attack. Soon, they become friends and find themselves in love with each other but keep it a secret. Asif starts a job in a private company and goes abroad for one year so he can prove himself to everyone and marry Sobia. Meanwhile, Amir returns after completing his studies. He falls in love with Sobia without realizing that she and Asif are dating. Majid finds out and wants his son to marry his niece, Sobia. Majid asks Muneera to talk to Sobia's mother for their proposal. Muneera tries to resist as she wanted Asif to marry Sobia because she knew about their relationship but couldn't. She visits Sobia's house with Amir's proposal for Sobia. She talks to her mother and her mother says she’ll have to ask Sobia. Sobia, listening to their conversation, agrees to the proposal. She was already engaged to her other cousin, who is her childhood best friend as well, Tahir who was in Dubai for a job with the reference of his sister. Sobia’s reasoning for why she agreed was because she couldn't refuse her uncle for his son's proposal as her uncle sponsored her medical education as well as gave her the lifestyle she had always wished for. They get married in a nikkah ceremony and on the same day, Asif comes back. He is confused because he doesn’t know who was getting married, until Sobia lifts her veil and reveals herself to be Amir’s bride. Heartbroken, he fights with his mother but all in vain. He tries to talk to Sobia who gets angry at him and yells at him to forget what happened between them as she is now married to Amir. Muneera forcefully marries Asif to her niece, Sadaf, whose mother is a cancer patient. On the night of Sobia and Amir's wedding, Asif enters Sobia’s room while Amir is outside with his friends. He tries to convince Sobia to divorce Amir and run away and start a new life with him as he is still under the impression that Sobia was pressured into marrying Amir, but she disagrees and tells him to leave. He gets angry and dishevels her look and pushes her harshly which causes her to become unconscious. After Asif leaves, Amir goes in and assumes that Asif had raped her. He gets his gun and threatens to shoot Asif, Muneera tries to stop him which results in her accidentally getting shot. She dies. Amir becomes mentally unstable. Majid surrenders himself to the police claiming that he shot his wife and goes to jail.

Few years later, Asif becomes wealthy after he inherits his boss's wealth and has become the CEO of a successful company, and has no contact with anyone. Sobia becomes a surgeon and lives somewhere else with Amir and their house-help. Tahir and his family have cut all ties with Sobia. Sadaf and her mother are living alone with no contact with Asif or his mother which causes them to think that Muneera has abandoned them, unaware of the fact that she had died. Sadaf, who is deeply in love with Asif since childhood, prays for Asif to come back and take her with him as she is afraid she will be alone when her mother passes away. She and her mother get sent money every month to look after the house expenses which they refuse this time as they think that there is no use to keep this money if their loved ones aren't in contact with them. Asif learns about this and finally goes to Sadaf's house. Sadaf tries to wake her mother but gets anxious when she doesn't respond, Asif arrives and it's confirmed that she died. Meanwhile, Tahir gets to know about Sobia's whereabouts and visits her, she reveals everything that happened on the night of her wedding, including that Amir still believes that Sobia was raped by Asif which she was not. Tahir and Sobia start seeing each-other almost everyday and he advises her to leave Amir as she is wasting her life away by staying with a mentally unstable man to which she refuses.

Asif brings Sadaf to his mansion, she refuses to stay there and keeps asking to go back to her mother's home as Asif does not care about her or give her the attention she wants. Asif gets to know the reason behind Sadaf’s behavior which makes him think that he should be more gentle and caring with her. Asif and Sadaf start getting closer, until one day Asif gets shot by the previous CEO's step-son as they want his inheritance. He gets admitted to the same hospital where Sobia operates as a surgeon. They both meet again and Asif starts having the same feelings for Sobia and asks her to marry him but she disagrees. He starts blaming his mother for everything and then Sobia reveals to him that his mother had died. With a heavy heart, he visits his mother's grave and tells her that he is now a successful man all thanks to her prayers. After meeting Sobia again, Asif has turned into the same angry, cold hearted man he was before with Sadaf which makes her really upset.

One day, Amir asks Sobia to let him meet Asif as he feels guilty and wants to apologize to him, fulfilling his request she calls Asif to come over to her house. When Asif arrives Amir feels emotional and apologizes to him but Asif expresses his anger and tells him that he and his father took away everything that was meant for him including his mother, Amir begs for forgiveness and Asif forgives him and Majid despite everything on Sobia’s request. Amir dies the next day.

4 months later, Asif keeping up with his stubborn behavior asks Sobia to marry him now that Amir is out of the picture, and she again disagrees. Sobia talks to Tahir and he goes to Asif's house and finds out he is already married, Asif gets angry and tells him to leave, Sadaf confronts Asif about Sobia and he ignores her. Asif meets Sobia again and she tells him to focus on himself and his wife, and that she cannot marry him when he’s already married. He continues to ask her to marry him. Fed up, Sobia asks whether he will divorce his wife just so he can marry her, assuming Sobia is giving him another chance Asif goes home and divorces Sadaf and tells her he cannot lose Sobia again. Asif goes back to Sobia and tells her they can now get married and as he divorced Sadaf, Sobia gets angry and curses him and tells him he ruined his life as he has left someone who has known and loved him since childhood, Asif tells her he does not care and all he wants is her, Tahir arrives and Asif realizes that Sobia and Tahir are now together. Asif accepts defeat and leaves, the drama ends with Asif lost in his thoughts while Sadaf is now pregnant and back at her maternal home.

== Cast ==
- Khushhal Khan as Asif; Muneera's son, Majid's step-son, Amir's step-brother and Sadaf's husband
- Komal Meer as Sobia; Salma's and Najib's younger daughter, Majid's niece and Amir's wife
- Subhan Awan as Amir; Majid's son, Muneera's step-son, Asif's step-brother and Sobia's husband
- Komail Anam as Tahir; Sobia and Amir’s cousin, Rashida's son
- Nadia Khan as Muneera; Asif's mother, Sobia's step mother-in-law, Majid's wife and Amir's step-mother
- Babar Ali as Majid; Amir's father, Asif's step-father, Muneera's husband, and Sobia's uncle & father-in-law
- Yashmeera Jan as Sadaf; Asif's wife, Muneera’s niece, Shakira’s daughter
- Shamil Khan as Najib; Sobia's father
- Tahira Imam as Majid & Najib's mother
- Javeria Khan as Samina; Sobia's best friend
- Ali Ammar as Imran; Asif's friend
- Maryam Shafi as Rashida; Majid & Najib's sister, Tahir's mother, Sobia's aunt
- Rubina Naz as Salma; Sobia’s mother, Najib's wife, Majid's sister-in-law

== Production ==
On 24 July 2022, the principal photography began in Islamabad about which Nadia Khan shared a video from the set where she revealed the cast, writer and director of the series also. To get into the character of a neglected son who has faced numerous deprivations, Khushhal Khan isolated himself in his house for two weeks, locking himself in a room to fully immerse in the role. The first teaser of the show was released on 15 August 2022.

== Soundtrack ==
The music of the original soundtrack of the series is composed by Naveed Nashad, performed by Asrar and Warda Lodhi, and lyrics by Qamar Nashad.
