= Zulm (TV series) =

Pakistani television series

- Genre: Action; Drama; Romance
- Written by: Rehana Aftab
- Directed by: Ilyas Kashmiri
- Starring: Faysal Quraishi; Shehzad Sheikh; Sahar Hashmi
- Music by: SK Salman Khan
- Opening theme: "Ye Zulm" by Yashal Shahid and Atif Ali
- Country of origin: Pakistan
- Original language: Urdu
- No. of episodes: 25

Production
- Producer: Momina Duraid
- Running time: 37 minutes
- Production company: MD Productions

Original release
- Network: Hum TV
- Release: November 20, 2023 – April 29, 2024

Zulm (Urdu: ظلم, lit. 'Oppression') is a 2023 Pakistani television series produced by Momina Duraid under her banner MD Productions. The series was written by Rehana Aftab and directed by Ilyas Kashmiri. It stars Faysal Quraishi, Shehzad Sheikh and debutante Sahar Hashmi as leads. The series premiered on Hum TV on November 20, 2023 in the night time programming. The series follows a young girl's quest for justice.

== Plot ==
Malik Ajlal is a wealthy and corrupt politician and businessman who wields immense power through his illegal activities. Feared by many, he controls the system with his influence and ruthlessness.

Meanwhile, Esha, a kind-hearted girl from a middle-class family, lives with her mother while her brother studies abroad. She falls in love with Asher, Ajlal’s younger brother, believing he reciprocates her feelings. However, Ajlal develops an interest in Esha and sends his sister, Minal, to propose on his behalf, informing Esha that he will return in 15 days to marry her. When Esha informs Asher about Ajlal’s proposal, he coldly dismisses their relationship, revealing that he never loved her and was merely passing time.

Esha’s brother, sensing the danger Ajlal poses, attempts to help her escape to a friend’s house. However, Ajlal learns of the plan and abducts them. A leaked video of their captivity forces him to release them when police intervene, but he quickly secures bail. Seeking revenge, Ajlal fabricates a criminal case against Esha’s brother, ensuring that no lawyer agrees to defend him. However, Shahwaiz, a determined lawyer, takes on the case and successfully secures his bail. An enraged Ajlal gets Esha’s brother murdered, leaving her devastated. She vows to seek justice and files a case against Ajlal.

Ajlal threatens Esha to withdraw her case, but she refuses. In retaliation, he also murders her mother, leaving her alone. Shahwaiz and his mother take Esha in, providing her with support as they continue the legal battle against Ajlal. Meanwhile, Minal, Ajlal’s younger sister, is married to Malik Zubair’s son, forming a political alliance between their families.

Ajlal further tightens his grip by falsely accusing both Esha and Shahwaiz of murdering Esha’s mother, leading to their arrest. With no lawyer willing to take their case, Shahwaiz’s mother steps in as their lawyer and secures their bail. A significant breakthrough occurs when a maid provides key testimony against Ajlal, leading to the issuance of an arrest warrant for him.

During this time, Minal is involved in a tragic accident, leaving her paralyzed. While in the hospital, she reveals that her husband took revenge on Ajlal for mistreating his ex-fiancée, Warda. Enraged, Ajlal kidnaps and murders Zubair’s son, prompting Zubair to vow vengeance. Assassination attempts are made on Ajlal, but he survives. Seeing the escalating conflict, Malik Israr, Ajlal’s father, arranges a meeting with Zubair under the pretense of peace. However, as Zubair is leaving, Israr has him killed in a bomb explosion.

As Ajlal attempts to escape, the police arrive to arrest him. Shortly after, his death warrant is issued. However, he manages to fake his suicide and disappears. In the final scene, it is revealed that Ajlal is still alive, vowing to return and seek revenge, leaving the story open-ended.

== Cast ==
- Faysal Quraishi as Malik Jalal
- Shahzad Sheikh
- Sahar Hashmi as Esha
- Saba Faisal
- Raeed Muhammad Alam
- Adla Khan as Hansa
- Tazeen Hussain
- Yasir Ali Khan
- Hani Taha as Marina
- Ahmed Rafiq

== Soundtrack ==
"Zulm"

Single by Yashal Shahid and Atif Ali
- Released: 25 October 2023
- Recorded: 2023
- Length: 2:59
- Label: Hum TV
- Composer: Atif Ali
- Lyricist: Wardha
- Producer: Momina Duraid

Music video
- Video on YouTube

The official soundtrack of the series is performed by Yashal Shahid and Atif Ali on the lyrics of Wardha and Music composition by Atif Ali.

== Production ==
In July 2023, Hum TV revealed that Quraishi will make comeback to the network after 8 years with his next project. The teaser of the series released on 16 October 2023 and premiered the first episode on 20 November 2023 on Hum TV respectively.

== Reception ==
The series was mentioned as an example of 'Pakistani dramas trending in India again'. A review of the first episode noted the series focused on the "relentless battle against injustice and power." Some aspects of the fictional lawyer played by Faysal Qurashi were judged offensive by the Karachi Bar Association and the actor apologised regarding the issue.

In a column in The Nation, Nudrat Nazir wrote that the main male character was part of a trend in the male figures portrayed by Quraishi that are "downright toxic and problematic. His character Malik Ajlal’s introductory scene in Zulm sees him throwing a man off a yacht and shooting him. He steps on the hands of his domestic help, who bumped into him and spilled water over his clothes until his hand began to bleed. He physically abuses his secret wife and has eyes for his sister’s friend, Eesha, who is probably twenty years younger than him.”
