= Shehrnaz =

2016 Pakistani television series

- Urdu: شھرناز
- Genre: Family drama; Serial drama; Romantic drama
- Written by: Hoor Shamaeel
- Screenplay by: Hoor Shameel
- Directed by: Syed Ahmed Kamran
- Starring: Ayeza Khan; Alyy Khan; Imran Ashraf; Farhan Ahmed Malhi
- Composer: Simaab Sen
- Country of origin: Pakistan
- Original language: Urdu
- No. of seasons: 1
- No. of episodes: 21

Production
- Executive producer: Danish Taimoor
- Producer: Mastermind Productions
- Cinematography: Qasim Zaman
- Editor: Hunain Shamim
- Camera setup: Multi-camera setup

Original release
- Network: Urdu 1
- Release: 2 November 2016 – 22 March 2017

Related
- Tum Kon Piya; Be Inteha

Shehrnaz is a Pakistani television drama serial, which aired on Urdu 1 from 12 November 2016 to 22 March 2017. It starred Ayeza Khan, Alyy Khan, Imran Ashraf and Farhan Ahmed Malhi. It was produced by Danish Taimoor.

== Synopsis ==
The story revolves around a beautiful girl Shehrnaaz. She lives with her father who is a poor tailor in Karachi's poor area. Despite their poverty, her father has made sure that his daughter goes to a top university. Shehrnaaz knows that she is beautiful and stands out amongst her peers. She wants to be a top class actress. Unfortunately, her background is a big hurdle in pursuing her career. Eventually she succeeds in realising her dream. But her success comes at a huge price.

== Cast ==
- Ayeza Khan as Shehrnaz
- Imran Ashraf as Nofil
- Alyy Khan as KK
- Farhan Ahmed Malhi as Sherry
- Ghana Ali as Sarah (Sherry's ex-wife)
- Komal Iqbal as Hina
- Sajid Hassan as Naseeb Gul (Guest appearance)
- Mehmood Akhtar as Mughal (Sherry's father)
- Nida Mumtaz as Tahira (Sherry's aunt)
- Humaira Bano as Sabahat (Sherry's mother)
- Anam Tanveer as Natasha
- Sonia Rao
- Rameez Siddiqui
- Maria Baloch
- Faisal H. Naqvi

== See also ==
- 2016 in Pakistani television
