= Rhythm (2016 film) =

2016 film by Vivek Kumar

- Poster
- Directed by: Vivek Kumar
- Story by: Vivek Kumar
- Produced by: Vivek Kumar
- Starring: Adeel Chaudhry; Rinil Routh; Vibhu K Raghave Gurleen Chopra; Kiran Srinivas; Kosha Jayaswal; Salman Ahmed
- Cinematography: Johny Lal
- Edited by: Manish More
- Music by: Adeel Chaudhry; Suresh Peters; Salman Ahmed
- Production company: Vicky Films
- Distributed by: Vicky Films
- Release date: 26 February 2016 (India)
- Country: India
- Language: Hindi

Rhythm is an Indian romantic musical film produced, directed and written by Vivek Kumar. The film production began in 2011 and was finally released on 26 February 2016 after being delayed for almost five years.

== Overview ==
R. N. Kumar presented the film. It was written and directed by Vivek Kumar. Rhythm was in the making for over six years. It starred Adeel Chaudhry and Rinil Routh in the lead cast and is the Bollywood debut of Adeel Chaudhry. Rhythm was shot in Poland and was scheduled for release on 19 February 2016 but the release was later pushed to 26 February 2016.

== Plot ==
Avantika (Rinil Routh) and her group of friends are part of an inter-college music and dance festival. Meanwhile, a new boy, Rohan (played by Adeel Chaudhry) transfers to her college for advanced studies. He falls madly in love with Avantika, but due to a past failed relationship, Avantika has built a wall around herself and does not let people enter her life beyond a certain point. After a series of incidents, Avantika realises something which changes her life.

== Cast ==
- Adeel Chaudhry as Rohan
- Rinil Routh as Avantika
- Gurleen Chopra
- Kiran Srinivas
- Kosha Jayaswal
- Vibhu K Raghave
- Kuba Gras
- Syed Abid Bhushan

== Soundtrack ==
Rhythm

Soundtrack album by Salman Ahmad Adeel Chaudhry
- Released: 2016
- Recorded: 2015
- Genre: Feature film soundtrack
- Label: Vicky Films
- Producer: Vivek Kumar

Music for the film was composed by Suresh Peters, Adeel Chaudhary, Pranay Rijia, Naveed Zafar and Junoon singer Salman Ahmed. Salman also made a guest appearance in the film as his Bollywood debut.
