= Samjhota =

Pakistani television series

- Title screen
- Genre: Family
- Written by: Rukhsana Nigar
- Directed by: Asad Jabal
- Starring: Adeel Chaudhry; Momina Iqbal; Shazeal Shoukat; Sidra Niazi; Ali Ansari; Shaista Lodhi; Jawed Sheikh; Mirza Zain Baig; Saba Faisal
- Country of origin: Pakistan
- Original language: Urdu
- No. of episodes: 53

Production
- Producer: iDream Entertainment
- Editor: Rao Shahbaz Tahir
- Camera setup: Multi-camera setup

Original release
- Network: ARY Digital
- Release: 16 January – 4 May 2023

Samjhota (Urdu: سمجھوتہ, lit. 'Compromise') is a Pakistani drama series that premiered on ARY Digital on 16 January in 2023. Directed by Asad Jabal and written by Rukhsana Nigar, it is a production of iDream Entertainment. It has Adeel Chaudhry, Momina Iqbal, Shazeal Shoukat, Sidra Niazi, Ali Ansari, Shaista Lodhi, Jawed Sheikh, Mirza Zain Baig and Saba Faisal in lead roles.

== Synopsis ==
Samjhota is the story of a businessman trying to gather himself and his family after his wife's passing. Later Waqar marries Nargis and she faces difficulties with his children.

== Cast ==
- Jawed Sheikh as Waqar (Munazzah & Nargis' husband)
- Saba Faisal as Munazzah (Waqar's wife) (who later dies)
- Adeel Chaudhary as Asad (Munzzah and Waqar's son)
- Shaista Lodhi as Nargis (Waqar's second wife)
- Mirza Zain Baig as Sarmad (Kubra's brother) (Dead)
- Shazeal Shoukat as Shanzay (Waqar and Munzzah's daughter)
- Sidra Niazi as Alizeh (Asad's wife)
- Sajida Syed as Husna (Rohail's mother and Waqar's sister)
- Ali Ansari as Zohaib (Munzzah and Waqar's son)
- Momina Iqbal as Mehreen (Zohiab's wife)
- Huma Nawab as Azra (Sarmad and Kubra's step-mother)
- Sadaf Aashan as Sobia (Ejaz's wife and Nargis's sister-in-law)
- Noor ul Hassan as Ahmad (Kubra and Sarmad's father)
- Izzah Malik as Warda (Shanzay's friend)
- Aliha Chaudry as Kubra (Sarmad's sister)
- Faraz Farooqui as Rohail (Husna's son and Waqar's nephew)
- Amber Khan as Fouzia (Alizeh's mother and Asad's mother-in-law)
- Sajid Shah as Ejaz (Sobia's husband and Mehreen's uncle)
- Shamoon Abbasi as Arif (Nargis's ex-husband)
- Anees Alam as Imtiaz (Waqar's servant)
- Shazia Qaiser as Sharjeel's mother
- Urooj Abbas as Javed (Sharjeel's father)
- Salma Qadir as Rubina (Azra's friend)
