= Farhan Ahmed Malhi =

Pakistani actor and model

Farhan Ahmad Malhi
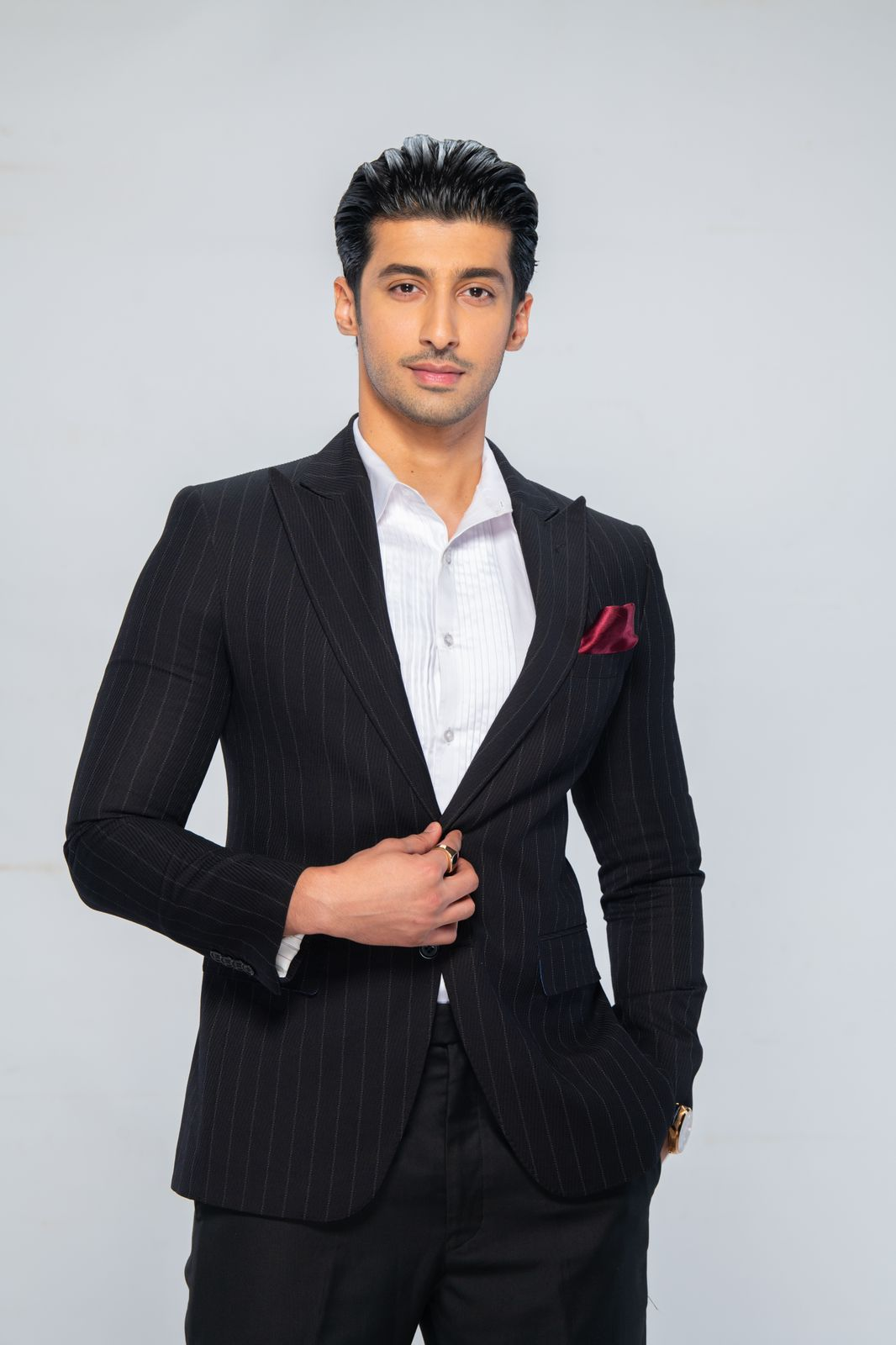
- Born: 24 November 1992 (age 33); Lahore, Pakistan
- Education: National College of Business Administration and Economics (MBA)
- Occupations: Actor; Model
- Years active: 2012–present

Farhan Ahmad Malhi (Urdu: فرحان احمد ملہی) is a Pakistani actor, model and former video jockey. He is known for his roles in dramas Kaisay Tum Se Kahoon, Hiddat, Uraan, Kaisa Hai Naseeban, Banno and Mohabbat Chor Di Maine.

== Early life ==
Farhan was born in Lahore, Pakistan. He completed his studies from National College of Business Administration & Economics and graduated with an MBA degree.

== Career ==
He began his career as a VJ on Style360 and then started modeling. In 2015 he made his debut as an actor in drama Kaisay Tum Se Kahoon as Ajju. He was noted for his roles in dramas Tumhari Natasha, Shehrnaz and Kathputli. He also appeared in dramas Rani Nokrani, Maamta, Tere Lie, Shiza, Faltu Larki and Rashk. Since then he appeared in dramas Hiddat, Kaisa Hai Naseeban, Laikin, Uraan, Banno and Mohabbat Chor Di Maine.

== Filmography ==
=== Television ===
Year	Title	Role	Network
2015	Kaisay Tum Se Kahoon	Ajju	Hum TV
2015	Tere Liye	Khizar	TV One
2015	Maamta	Wahad	ARY Digital
2015	Tumhari Natasha	Kaif	Hum TV
2016	Kathputli	Ahad	Hum TV
2016	Shehrnaz	Sherry	Urdu 1
2016	Faltu Larki	Yasir	A-Plus
2017	Hiddat	Farhad	Geo Entertainment
2017	Shiza	Hashir	ARY Digital
2017	Laikin	Hashim	A-Plus
2018	Rashk	Saaz	Express Entertainment
2018	Mazaaq Raat	Himself	Dunya News
2018	Kabhi Band Kabhi Baja	Ali	Express Entertainment
2019	Kaisa Hai Naseeban	Waheed	ARY Digital
2019	Rani Nokrani	Fareeh	Express Entertainment
2019	Mazaaq Raat	Himself	Dunya News
2019	Piya Naam Ka Diya	Waqas	Geo TV
2020	Uraan	Aqeel	Geo TV
2021	Banno	Nihal	Geo Entertainment
2021	Mohabbat Chor Di Maine	Hazim	Geo TV
2022	Mere Damad	Aliyan	Hum TV
2024	Lagay Aag Iss Mohabbat Ko	Faiz	Aur Life
2025	Makafaat Season 7	Munawar	Geo TV
2025	Umme Ayesha Season 2	Azmeer	Geo Entertainment
2025	Kathputli	Ayan	Geo TV
2026	Iblees	Shahwaiz	Geo Entertainment

=== Telefilm ===
Year	Title	Role
2017	Kambakht Dil	Zaid Ahmed
2017	Merey Sanwariya Ka Naam	Noman
