= Kaisay Tum Se Kahoon =

- Written by: Maha Malik
- Directed by: Fahim Burney
- Starring: Saba Qamar; Adeel Chaudhry; Farhan Ahmed Malhi
- Opening theme: "Kaisay Tum Se Kahoon" by Adeel Chaudhry
- Country of origin: Pakistan
- Original language: Urdu
- No. of seasons: 1

Production
- Producers: Concepts & Fahim Burney
- Running time: 30–45 minutes

Original release
- Network: Hum TV
- Release: 26 July – 13 December 2015

Kaisay Tum Se Kahoon (Urdu: کیسے تم سے کہیں, lit. 'How to tell you?') is a 2015 Pakistani romantic drama serial airing on Hum TV based on the novel of Maha Malik. The series is directed by Fahim Burney and produced by Concepts & Fahim Burney, including a stellar cast of Saba Qamar, Adeel Chaudhary, Farhan Ahmed Malhi and Aleezay Tahir.

It aired Sunday evenings at 8pm and is a hugely popular serial, especially abroad in the U.K. where it has been getting record ratings of viewership between 60,000–85,000 viewers in its last few weeks of airing. The drama has a total of 20 episodes.

== Synopsis ==
The story of drama begins off demonstrating Anamta (Saba Qamar), a mother of two, as the joyful housewife who is very excited about her child's birthday celebration. Be that as it may, her better half Mansoor (Adeel Chaudhry) is nowhere to be seen which clearly irritates Anamta's venerating father. Anamta, being a devoted wife, tries to persuade her father that all's well between the lovebirds, however inside, even she is disturbed by Mansoor's absence as she had observed him to be loving and caring towards her and adhering to her in all circumstances previously. Actually Mansoor was screwed over thanks to his associate Bakhtiar's ill health. He saw the latter experiencing a heart failure in the parking lot of his workplace and henceforth hurried him to the hospital. Anamta (called Annu by family) is actually pissed. She also has other things on her mind. Her estranged cousin Minhaj (otherwise known as Mannu) has as of late come back from abroad and is around the local area nowadays. The flirtatious man had a soft corner for Annu and still does regardless of her being married. He shows up at a gathering and both get to catch up with one another. Mansoor tries to offer some kind of reparation by taking his family to a picnic. However, as it would turn out, Mrs. Bakhtiar calls him and reveals to him how her unwell spouse needs him badly at the hospital. The caring Mansoor again cancels the picnic and chooses to go tend to his colleague. Annu is miserable and Mannu who had accompanied them rubs salt into her injuries by embedding misguided judgments in her mind about her husband. Upon returning home, Annu is floored by the presence of an obscure woman at her home sleeping soundly with a child. They are Bakhtiar's wife and child. Mansoor had brought them to his own place that night because they were too tired to travel back to their house. After Bakhtiar's wife explains this, Annu is relieved and happily introduces herself. The two women get to know each other after that day and become friends. However life takes a sharp turn after Bakhtiar dies and his brother, who has the house in his name, throws out Bakhtiar's wife and child. Mrs Bakhtiar and her daughter have to move in Annu's house. Here the plot officially starts with the lives of Annu, Mansoor, Mannu and Mrs Bakhtiar intertwine with each other as feelings like doubt, trust, envy and love arise.

== Cast ==
- Saba Qamar as Anamta
- Adeel Chaudhry as Mansoor
- Farhan Ahmed Malhi as 'Ajju'
- Alizay Tahir as Noor-ul-Ain
- Irfan Khoosat as Anamta's father
- Tariq Tayyab
- Kamran Mujahid
