= Jo Tu Chahey =

Pakistani television series

- Official title card
- Also known as: previously entitled Kun Faya Kun
- جو تو چاھے
- Genre: Drama
- Written by: Qaisra Hayat
- Screenplay by: Qaisra Hayat
- Directed by: Ilyas Kashmiri(actor)
- Starring: Imran Abbas; Alizeh Shah; Zarnish Khan
- Country of origin: Pakistan
- Original language: Urdu
- No. of seasons: 1
- No. of episodes: 43

Production
- Producer: Momina Duraid
- Production locations: Rawalpindi, Pakistan
- Camera setup: Multi-camera setup
- Running time: approx. 42-44 minutes
- Production company: MD Productions

Original release
- Network: Hum TV
- Release: 4 July 2019 – 5 June 2020

Jo Tu Chahay is a 2019 Pakistani television series that premiered on Hum TV. Produced by Momina Duraid under MD Productions, it stars Imran Abbas, Alizeh Shah, Ahmad Taha Ghani, and Zarnish Khan in lead roles. It received mixed reviews from critics as well as viewers for being dragged.

== Synopsis ==
The series weaves together themes of faith in a higher power, destiny, soulful romance, and the danger of wishes made in moments of pain. At its heart is Mashal, a quiet yet resilient young woman whose life is shaped by loss, endurance, and unwavering belief that God sees even the most unseen suffering.

Mashal’s life is marked by tragedy from an early age. At just five years old, she loses her parents in a car accident and is taken in by her paternal family. She grows up under the care of her grandmother, Apa Ji, who becomes her only true source of love, protection, and emotional stability. Apa Ji raises Mashal with patience, humility, and deep faith, teaching her to endure hardship with dignity and trust in divine justice.

Despite Apa Ji’s presence, Mashal is consistently mistreated within the household. Her aunts—Tayi Ammi, Fasiha, and Shama Cachi—treat her as a burden, while her cousins Bisma and Areesha mock and belittle her. Burhan’s persistent harassment makes her life even more unbearable. In contrast, her uncles remain kind and fair, and two of her cousins, Hashir and Arman, offer her genuine care and protection. Among them, Hashir becomes her quiet guardian, always watching over her even when he cannot openly intervene.

When Apa Ji suddenly dies of a heart attack, Mashal loses her final shield. Honoring Apa Ji’s wishes, Taya Abu and Chacha Jan decide to take responsibility for Mashal by arranging that she stay fifteen days at each of their homes. What appears reasonable soon turns into another cycle of rejection. In both houses, Mashal is subjected to constant emotional abuse by Tayi Ammi, Chachi, Bisma, and Burhan, while the uncles and Hashir remain the only sources of kindness.

Eventually, the cruelty reaches its peak. Chachi throws Mashal out of the house, refusing to keep her any longer. Desperate and with nowhere to turn, Mashal goes to Taya Abu’s home, only for Tayi Ammi to reject her as well. Homeless, heartbroken, and stripped of dignity, Mashal disappears without a word.

Her disappearance deeply unsettles Hashir. Sensing that Mashal is in danger, he and the two uncles search for her relentlessly, but their efforts lead nowhere. Guided by instinct and love, Hashir finally goes to Apa Ji’s house—the only place Mashal ever truly felt safe. There, he finds her, broken and alone, surrounded by memories of the one person who never abandoned her.

Hashir brings Mashal home and, having witnessed the consequences of silence and compromise, makes a decisive stand. He ends the fifteen-day arrangement entirely and insists that Mashal stay at his house permanently. His decision challenges family traditions and exposes long-hidden cruelty, but it also gives Mashal something she has never truly had: a home where she is chosen, protected, and valued.

This turning point becomes the emotional foundation of the series—deepening the bond between Mashal and Hashir, setting the stage for a soulful romance, and reinforcing the central message that faith, patience, and courage can transform suffering into destiny, though never in the way one expects.

== Controversy ==
The serial was earlier titled Kun Faya Kun. However, due to controversies and objections from a religious group (Kun Faya Kun is not only the attribute of Allah Almighty but also a Quranic verse), the producers rebranded the series as Jo Tu Chahey.

== Reception ==
During the run of the series, it obtained mixed reviews from both critics and the audience. However, by the season finale, it went on to be one of the top 10 trending dramas in Pakistan with a huge TRP of 10.3. It has an extensive base in the YouTube community with over 3 million views per episode. It was doing average till it was re-branded. After re-branding, it faced a drastic boost in its viewership.

It also did well in UK where it several times tops the weekly chart of Pakistani and Asian TV shows.

== Cast ==
- Imran Abbas as Hashir Abbas
- Alizeh Shah as Mashal Azam
- Zarnish Khan as Bisma Ubaid
- Azra Mansoor as Aapa Ji
- Areej Mohyudin as Areesha Abbas
- Ahmad Taha Ghani as Armaan Ubaid
- Raeed Muhammad Alam as Burhan Ubaid
- Naima Khan as Fasiha Begum
- Nargis Rasheed as Shama Begum
- Mohsin Gilani as Mohammad Ubayd
- Humayun Gul as Mohammad Abbas
