= Ki Jaana Main Kaun =

Pakistani TV show

- Developed by: Shahzad Javed
- Written by: Uzma Iftikhar; Furqan Sahir
- Directed by: Mohsin Talat
- Presented by: Moomal Productions
- Starring: Faizan Khawaja; Minal Khan; Saad Qureshi; Yashma Gill
- Theme music composer: Wajid Saeed Studio
- Opening theme: "Ki Jaana Main Kaun" Singer(s); Alycia Dias; Lyrics by Ali Moeen
- Composer: Waqar Ali
- Country of origin: Pakistan
- Original language: Urdu
- No. of episodes: 41 episodes

Production
- Producer: Moomal Shunaid
- Production locations: Karachi, Sindh
- Editors: Anila Wasiq; Nimra Malik
- Camera setup: Multi-camera setup
- Production company: Moomal Productions

Original release
- Network: Hum TV, Hum Network Limited
- Release: 27 June – 22 November 2018

Ki Jaana Main Kaun (Urdu: کی جاناں میں کون, lit. 'I Know Not Who I Am') is a Pakistani drama serial started airing on Hum TV from 27 June 2018. It is written by Uzma Iftikhar and Furqanullah Sahir, developed by Shahzad Javed, Head of Content, HUM TV, directed by Mohsin Talat and produced by Moomal Shunaid under their banner Moomal Productions. It features Faizan Khawaja, Minal Khan and Saad Qureshi.

== Plot ==
The story revolves around Meher Ansari, a young beautiful and intelligent girl, who is the only daughter of Shafiq Ansari and Rabya Ansari, and is engaged to her uncle's son, Taimoor Ansari. Taimoor is also the only child of his parents, Rafiq and Saira. Taimoor pretends that he loves Meher but he is only interested in her property. The story also includes Rafiq and Shafiq's sister Maliha who is married to Qazim, and has a son named Faris. Faris had gone abroad to complete his law study and intensely loved Meher in secret but he is unable to express his feelings as Meher loved Taimoor. But the two share best friend bond. He returned to Pakistan for Meher and Taimoor's marriage and become shocked on knowing about his father's rude behaviour towards Maliha. On day of nikkah it was revealed that meher is adopted child of Shafiq and in real is daughter of man named Waqar. This leads to Taimoor and his family breaking marriage with Meher, as they are only interested in her property. Taimoor marries his aunt's daughter, Anaya, who began to take control of his whole house and start to freely spend money, which annoys Taimoor and his whole family. Maliha informs Meher that she is the daughter of Maliha's friends Rizwana and Waqar, and that Maliha has brought her to Shafiq who adopted Meher happily. Faris gets appointed as Shafiq's lawyer. Shafiq suffers heart attack due to everyone accusing his and Meher relationship as non-Islamic. In meantime Meher and Faris grow closer so Taimoor taunts them. Meher, with the help of Faris, go to Hyderabad in search of Meher's biological parents. But on their way back to home some mobile snatchers attack them and loot them. Faris got injured in process. When they return home Shafiq gets angry with Meher that she does not consider him as her father but Meher asks for forgiveness and he forgives her. On Meher's birthday, Shafiq Ansari gives 30% shares to Meher, which makes Taimoor's family angry and she becomes the part of board of directors then Faris explains the Islamic way of property division which explains that an alive person can give his property to anyone but a dead person's assets only divide into that person's real family. The next day Taimoor threatens to Shafiq Ansari that he will go to court and ask for DNA test but Shafiq slaps him then Faris told him that he should not let the merger company know about this, otherwise the company will not do merger with them. Shahroz Hassan is the nephew of Khan Sahab who is a businessman; he wants to do something of his own which is why he is planning to merge with Meher's company. He meets with Taimoor and Meher to finalize the merger. Meher arranged a party for the business success and in the party Meher's phupho Maliha slaps Khan Sahab and then she faints.

Maliha is taken to the hospital and doctors told Faris that she has had a nervous breakdown and that he is under great stress. Kazim thinks Meher is the reason for her stress while Faris says he is the one who has caused his mother stress.

After the slapping incident Shehroz calls and cancels the merger, Meher goes and talks to him as a friend and manages to make him change his decision. But when Meher goes back to office Taimoor tells her that he has failed in her effort as the Khan industries has filed a defamation case against them. But Shehroz later tells Meher that it's Khan uncle's son who Filed the case and he will convince him to close it until Meher provides a proper explanation on why her Phupho slapped his Khan Uncle.

Maliha regains her consciousness and Qazim interrogates her and points fingers on her character and accuses her of having a past affair with Khan Shaab but Maliha speaks and tells everyone that Khan Sahaab is none but Waqar Ahmed Khan, Meher's Biological Father who left his pregnant wife Rizwana (Meher's mother). Meher is shocked by this revelation and is sad because her father didn't even recognize her.

After Maliha is a little stable she takes Meher and goes go Khan Villas and Tells Khaan Sahab that she slapped him because he deserved it and he is Meher's father. Khan Sahaab denies it and Amu jaan (Shehroz's aunt) asks the guards to throw Meher and her father out of their house. Meher is very disheartened and Shafeeeq is sad that Meher's father denied his own blood. Ahmar (Meher's stepbrother) learns the truth and decides to bring Meher as his sister despite whole Khans opposition. Taimoor now tries to come near Meher as her status is higher than him now making Anaya jealous.

== Cast ==
- Faizan Khawaja as Faris Sheraz
- Minal Khan as Meher Ansari/Meher Waqar/Meher Faris
- Saad Qureshi as Taimoor Ansari
- Khalid Anam as Shafiq Ansari
- Mehmood Aslam as Waqar Ahmad Khan Sahab (Meher's biological father)
- Zainab Qayyum as Maliha Kazim
- Annie Zaidi as Rabya Ansari
- Yashma Gill as Anaya Taimoor Ansari
- Adnan Jillani as Kazim
- Humaira Bano as Saira Ansari
- Daniyal Raheel as Shehroze Hassan
- Srha Asghar as Samra Waqar (Ahmer and Meher's sister)
- Usman Mazhar as Ahmer (Meher's brother and Waqar's son)
