= Areej Mohyudin =

Pakistani television actress

Areej Mohyudin is a Pakistani television actress. She made her on-screen debut with Momina Duraid's Tajdeed-e-Wafa in 2018 and later appeared in Jo Tu Chahey the same year. She then played the leading roles in Tum Se Kehna Tha (2020), Roag (2022) and Bojh (2023).

She gained fame for her role in ARY Digital’s horror drama Bandish 2 and soap opera Meray Hi Rehna (both in 2023).

== Television ==
Year	Title	Role	Network	Notes	Ref(s)
2018	Tajdeed e Wafa	Warisha	Hum TV	Debut	
2019	Jo Tu Chahey	Areesha	Hum TV		
2020	Qurbatain	Sadia	Hum TV		
2020	Tum Se Kehna Tha	Rabi	Hum TV		
2021	Ahl-e-Wafa	Minahil	A PLUS		
2021	Qissa Meherbano Ka	Noor	Hum TV		
2022	Roag	Muskaan	Hum TV		
2023	Bandish 2	Minahil	ARY Digital		
