= Subhan Awan =

Pakistani actor

- Born: Muhammad Subhan Awan; 5 May 1996 (age 30); Karachi, Sindh, Pakistan
- Education: NED University of Engineering & Technology
- Occupations: Actor; Model
- Years active: 2017 – present
- Spouse: Washma Fatima (m. 2023)

Subhan Awan (born 5 May 1996) is a Pakistani actor and model. He is known for his roles in Tum Se Kehna Tha, Roag, Wehshi, Saza e Ishq, Tinkay Ka Sahara and Tere Bin.

== Early life and education ==
Subhan was born in Karachi, Sindh at Pakistan. He graduated in textile engineering from NED University of Engineering & Technology.

== Career ==
=== Model ===
After completing his studies, he shared some of his photographs with Citrus Talent, a Karachi-based talent management agency.

In 2018 he started working as a model and worked in many commercials Zong Circle, English Toothpaste, Q- Mobile and Djuice. He started getting attention after he did the video and photo shoot with Almirah.

He also did modeling for brands Amir Adnan, HSY, Nomi Ansari, Noman Arfeen, Al Karam, Gul Ahmed, Oxford, Lawrance Pur and he also did modeling for Noir a Bangladeshi clothing brand.

=== Actor ===
He made his debut as an actor in the drama Yaqeen Ka Safar. Then he appeared in several dramas including Muthi Bhar Chahat, Saza e Ishq, Tehra Aangan, Tinkay Ka Sahara, Wehshi and Tere Bin.

== Personal life ==
He married model and actress Washma Fatima on 4 January 2023.

== Filmography ==
=== Television serials ===
Year	Title	Role	Network	Reference
2017	Yaqeen Ka Safar	Zubiya's prospect suitor	Hum TV	
2018	Noor	Shehryar	Express Entertainment	
2018	Jaltay Khwab	Danish	Express Entertainment	
2019	Qismat	Waleed	Hum TV	
2019	Muthi Bhar Chahat	Umair	Express Entertainment	
2020	Tum Se Kehna Tha	Saim	Hum TV	
2020	Saza e Ishq	Fahad	Express Entertainment	
2021	Tehra Aangan	Moeed	Express Entertainment	
2022	Bichoo	Abrar	Hum TV	
2022	Roag	Ibad	Hum TV	
2022	Wehshi	Amir	Hum TV	
2022	Tinkay Ka Sahara	Salman	Hum TV	
2022	Tere Bin	Rohail	Geo Entertainment	
2023	Meray Hi Rehna	Omer	ARY Digital	
2023	Kahain Kis Se	Arsal	Hum TV	
2024	Hasrat	Hamza	ARY Digital	
2024	Qissa-e-Dil	Jasim	Hum TV	
2025	Inteha	Ahmed	ARY Digital	
2026	Mere Pass Raho Tum	Anas	Express Entertainment	
2026	Mere Pass Raho Tum	Sufiyan	Green Entertainment	

=== Web series ===
Year	Title	Role	Network
2021	Dai	Anwar	Urduflix

== Awards and nominations ==
Year	Award	Category	Result	Title	Ref.
2020	7th Hum Awards	Most Popular Model Male	Nominated	Fashion	
2022	Nation's Leader Awards	Best Emerging Talent Of the Year	Won	—N/a	
