= Mohabbat Chor Di Maine =

Pakistani television series

- محبّت چھوڑ دی میں نے
- Written by: Naila Ansari
- Directed by: Shaqielle Khan
- Starring: Hajra Yamin; Mohsin Abbas Haider; Mariyam Nafees; Farhan Ahmed Malhi; Rushna Khan
- Country of origin: Pakistan
- Original language: Urdu
- No. of episodes: 51

Production
- Producers: Abdullah Kadwani; Asad Qureshi
- Production company: 7th Sky Entertainment

Original release
- Network: Geo Entertainment
- Release: 7 October – 22 November 2021

Mohabbat Chor Di Maine (transl. I've quit love) is a Pakistani romantic drama television series produced by Abdullah Kadwani and Asad Qureshi under 7th Sky Entertainment. This Urdu language drama serial was written by Naila Ansari and directed by Shaqielle Khan. It premiered on 7 October 2021, and aired daily at 9:00 p.m. on Geo TV.

== Plot ==
Komal couldn't imagine another tragedy is yet to turn her world upside down. After learning about her husband's alternate life, Komal sees that her former lover, Hazim, has returned. However, the bittersweet memories from the past continue to trigger her and she decides that she will not allow any man to make a mockery of her, at least not in Hazim's presence, who had already once left her for another woman. While everyone could see her married life come crumbling down, Komal remains in denial and decides that she will make her husband, Omer, stay even if it means co-existing with the second wife.

However, her huge compromise perfectly overshadows her true intention. She won't be letting anyone get away with betrayal.

== Cast ==
- Hajra Yamin as Komal
- Mohsin Abbas Haider as Omer; Komal's husband
- Mariyam Nafees as Sehar; Omer's second wife
- Farhan Ahmed Malhi as Hazim; Komal's former fiancé
- Rushna Khan as Zaini; Omer's widowed sister
- Tariq Jamil as Mohsin; Komal's father
- Seemi Pasha as Shehnaz; Mohsin's second wife
- Haris Waheed as Bazil; Komal's half-brother; Mohsin & Shehnaz's son
- Zainab Qayyum as Tabinda; Hazim's mother; Shehnaz's sister
- Fareeha Jabeen as Fouzia; Sehar's mother
- Fahima Awan as Aniba; Komal's friend
- Mohsin Aijaz as Sarfaraz; brother of Sehar's deceased first husband
- Manahil Naveed as Filza; Komal & Omer's daughter
- Rimha Ahmed as Aleena; Hazim's sister; Tabinda's daughter
- Salma Qadir as Noori; Komal's maid

== Soundtrack ==
The official soundtrack of Aik Gunah Aur Sahi was sung by the legendary singer Sahir Ali Bagga, who is also the man behind its music composition and lyrics.
