= Seemi Pasha =

Pakistani actress (born 1959)

- Born: 5 January 1959 (age 67); Lahore, Punjab, Pakistan
- Occupation: Actress
- Years active: 1990s-present
- Known for: Acting
- Spouse: Zia Pashah
- Children: 2

Seemi Pasha is a Pakistani film and television actress and former model, from Lahore. She is best known for portraying the roles of mothers in Pakistani television series. Her prominent appearances include Sanjha, Shehr-e-Zaat, Kahi Unkahi, Rishtay Kuch Adhooray Se, Mere Khuda, Khaani, Ishqiya, Malaal-e-Yaar, and Fitrat.

== Filmography ==
=== Films ===
- Rangreza (2017)

=== Television ===
Year	Title	Role	Channel	Notes
2005	La Hasil	Nuzhat	Hum TV	
2009	Noorpur Ki Rani		Hum TV	
2010	Aashti	Sherry	Hum TV	
2011	Phir Chand Pe Dastak		Hum TV	
2011	Bin Tere		Hum TV	
2011	Meri Jaan		Hum TV	
2011–2012	Sanjha	Shabo	Hum TV	
2011–2013	Khushboo Ka Ghar		ARY Digital	
2012	Mera Saaein 2		ARY Digital	
2012	Shehr-e-Zaat	Nusrat Ansar	Hum TV	
2012	Meri Behan Meri Devrani		ARY Digital	
2012	Mera Pehla Pyar	Zarva	ARY Digital	
2012	Sasural Ke Rang Anokhay		Hum TV	
2013	Kahi Unkahi	Naila	Hum TV	
2013	Ek Pagal Si Larki	Nabeela's mother	Hum TV	
2013	Rishtay Kuch Adhooray Se	Arsal's mother	Hum TV	
2013	Kadoorat	Daniyal's mother	Hum TV	
2013	Teri Berukhi		Geo Entertainment	
2013-2014	Meri Zindagi Hai Tu		Geo Entertainment	
2014	Pyaar Hai Tu Mera		Hum Sitaray	
2014	Mere Meherbaan	Naima	Hum TV	
2014	Parvarish		ARY Digital	
2014	Jab We Wed	Rumi's mother	Urdu 1	
2014	Shadi Aur Tum Say?		Hum TV	
2014-2015	Iqraar		Geo Entertainment	
2014-2015	Deemak		Geo Entertainment	
2014-2015	Darbadar Tere Liye	phuppho	Hum TV	
2015	Nikah	Rohail's mom	Hum TV	
2015	Bikhra Mera Naseeb		Geo Entertainment	
2015	Dil Ka Kya Rung Karun		Hum TV	
2015	Inteha		Express Entertainment	
2015	Mere Khuda	Tania's mother	Hum TV	
2015	Tum Se Mil Kay		ARY Digital	
2015-2016	Tere Mere Beech	Surrahya	Hum TV	
2016	Naimat	Zara's Aunt	ARY Digital	
2016	Tum Milay		ARY Digital	
2016	Dil Haari	Nargis	ARY Zindagi	
2016	Mera Dard Bayzuban		Geo Entertainment	
2016	Kitni Girhain Baaki Hain (season 2)	Seemi's mother	Hum TV	
2017	Titli		Urdu 1	
2017	Laut Ke Chalay Aana	Shamim	Geo Entertainment	
2017	Hiddat	Azra	Geo Entertainment	
2017	Iltija	Hina's mother	ARY Digital	
2017	Baday Mian		TV One	Telefilm
2017–2018	Aisi Hai Tanhai	Hamza's mother	ARY Digital	
2017–2018	Tau Dil Ka Kia Hua	Muzna's mother	Hum TV	
2017–2018	Alif Allah Aur Insaan	Shaheer's mother	Hum TV	
2017–2018	Khaani	Iffet	Geo Entertainment	
2017–2018	Ghar Titli Ka Par	Aazir's mother	Geo Entertainment	
2017–2018	Zard Zamano Ka Sawera		ARY Digital	
2018	Mah-e-Tamaam	Aliya	Hum TV	
2018	Tabeer	Fawad's mother	Hum TV	
2018	Haara Dil	Arham's mother	A-Plus TV	
2018	Ru Baru Ishq Tha	Aalia	Geo TV	
2018	Band Khirkiyan		Hum TV	
2018	Bisaat e Dil	Hannan's mother	Hum TV	
2018	Seerat		Geo Entertainment	
2019	Gustakh Dil		Express Entertainment	
2019	Mera Rab Waris	Haris's mother	Geo Entertainment	
2019	Do Bol	Jahan Ara	ARY Digital	
2019	Rani Nokrani		Express Entertainment	
2019	Bharosa Pyar Tera	Ishrat	Geo Entertainment	
2019	Mein Na Janoo	Sabra	Hum TV	
2019	Malaal-e-Yaar	Suraiyya	Hum TV	
2020	Munafiq	Shaheen, Sobia's mother	Geo Entertainment	
2020	Fitrat	Shahbaz and Arbaz's mother	Geo Entertainment	
2020	Ishqiya	Saman Khalid	ARY Digital	
2020	Bandhay Aik Dor Say	Shaista	Geo Entertainment	
2021	Mujhe Khuda Pay Yaqeen Hai	Nazneen's biological mother		
2021	Rang Mahal	Hajra's mother		
2021	Banno	Riffat, Nihal's mother		
2021	Mohabbat Chor Di Maine	Shehnaz, Baazil's mother		
2021	Khuda Aur Muhabbat (season 3)	Arfa Begum		
2021–2022	Fasiq			
2021–2022	Bebasi		Hum TV	
2022	Dil-e-Veeran		ARY Digital	
2022-23	Tere Bin	Sabra Khan	Geo Entertainment	
2023	Dil Hi To Hai			
2024-25	Iqtidar	Beenish Safdar	Green TV	
2025	Sharpasand		Ary digital	
2025	Dorr		Express entertainment	
