= List of Zanjeerain characters =

The characters of the Pakistani television drama serial Zanjeerain were created by Farhat Ishtiaq. The serial follows the journey of a courageous young woman and a university-graduate tribal man whose paths cross as they face the tragedies in their lives and struggle against the betrayal, animosity and feudalism. The chief characters were portrayed by Sajal Aly, Danyal Zafar, Sahar Hashmi, Ahsan Khan, Reza Ali Abid, Usman Javed, Anaya Shahid, Adnan Siddiqui.

== Casting and development of characters ==
Sajal Aly and Ameer Gilani's casting was reported earliest of all, in June 2025. Sahar Hashmi was offered to portray the principle character of Shehar Bano, but she refused the part, and agreed later when the producer Momina Duraid herself approached her. Ahsan Khan was cast for a cameo, but considering the audience response his part was extended. Unlike, Adnan Siddiqui and Usman Javed who were cast in chief roles of villains, yet their roles were cut down in post-production, as stated by Siddiqui.

== Cast and characters ==
Main characters of Zanjeerain featuring (clockwise from upper left corner) Sajal Aly as Rabiya, Adnan Siddiqui as Zafraan Khan, Ahsan Khan as Sher Dil Khan, Anaya Shahid as Shireen, Usman Javed as Torsam Khan, Ameer Gilani as Mudassir Alam, Sahar Hashmi as Shehar Bano, Momal Sheikh as Mah Gul, Danyal Zafar as Sarbuland Khan (behind) and Reza Ali Abid as Sohraab Khan

- Sajal Aly as Rabiya "Biya"/ Zarmala:

a young orphaned dhaba-owner living with her uncle and a younger teen brother. She is married-off to Mudassir after Torsam Khan harass her at her dhaba at times.

- Ameer Gilani as Mudassir Alam:

an Islamabad-based engineer and Sarbuland's close and childhood friend. He falls for Biya after coming across her for the first time at her dhaba.

- Danyal Zafar as Sarbuland Khan:

a university graduate and a close and childhood friend of Mudassir. He loves her fiancée Shehar Bano and is the younger brother of Sher Dil Khan. He wants to flee away from the Sardari system.

- Sahar Hashmi as Shehar Bano:

the orphaned cousin of Sarbuland Khan and his fiancée. She loves Sarbuland and shares a great bond with his mother Bi Jaan, and sister-in-law Mah Gul. After her parents' death, she was raised by her paternal uncle Sardar Hayat Khan and his wife Bi Jaan along with his brother Sohraab Khan with great affection and love.

- Ahsan Khan as Sardar Sher Dil Khan:

the Sardar of the village Garhi Alif Khan and the elder brother of Sarbuland. He is married to Mah Gul and loves his wife. He holds a position of patriarch of his family and takes a great care of the people of his tribe against his rivalry with Zafraan Khan.

- Momal Sheikh as Mah Gul:

Wife of Sher Dil Khan. She shares a friendly bond with Shehar Bano and takes great care of her husband.

- Reza Ali Abid as Sohraab Khan:

Shehar Bano's elder brother and Sarbuland and Sher Dil's cousin. He is married to Shah Noor and has a son, Umer Daraz, from her.

- Usman Javed as Torsam Khan:

son of Sardar Hayat Khan and Zarsanga, who was given to Khan's family as a Vani. He is short-tempered, impulsive and has a bitter sweet relatonship with Bi Jaan. He only considers Zafraan Khan, the brother of his mother, as his well-wisher. He harasses on several occasions Biya when comes across her at her Dhaba and wants to marry her forcefully.

- Adnan Siddiqui as Zafraan Khan:

Uncle of Torsam Khan, the brother of Zarsanga and rival of Sher Dil Khan.

- Anaya Shahid as Shireen:

Househelp at the haveli of Sarbuland Khan and Sher Dil Khan and has been worked there since her childhood. She is cunning and shrewd and tries to keep an eye on every minute matter of the haveli.

- Anam Hussain as Shah Noor:

Wife of Sohraab and the mother of Umer Daraz

- Samiya Mumtaz as Bi Jaan

Widow of Sardar Hayat Khan. Mother of Sher Dil Khan and Sarbuland Khan. Aunt and adoptive mother of Shehar Bano and Sohraab Khan. Step-mother of Torsam Khan. Mother-in-law of Shah Noor. She loves Shehar Bano very much.

- Mehermaan Khan as Gul Meher:

Torsam's cousin and niece of Zafraan Khan. She loves Torsam.

- Hassan Noman as Mama Ji:

Uncle of Biya and Tayyab

- Simi Raheal as fortune teller (Episode 1 & 12)

== Plot ==
Torsam is the stepbrother of Sarbuland, Sher Dil and Sohrab. Zafraan Khan is his maternal uncle. Torsam and Gul Meher live with Zafraan, while Sarbuland, Sher Bano, Sohrab and Sher Dil live at the Mansion. Mudassir is Sarbuland's close friend. The conflict between the Khan family and Zafraan Khan begins over a land dispute. Zafraan's men attack the family's fields and damage their crops. Sohrab confronts the men and takes action against them. Meanwhile, the family faces disagreements over the position of chief and the future of the Mansion. Mudassir and his companions visit Rabiya's Eatery, where Mudassir falls in love with Rabiya. Torsam also becomes interested in her and starts harassing her. Rabiya confronts him with a knife, but Torsam threatens her and gives her ten days to marry him. When Rabiya's brother, Tayyab, asks Mudassir for help, Mudassir learns about Torsam's threats. Mudassir and Rabiya decide to get married.

On the day of their wedding anniversary, Sher Dil is killed. The family initially suspects Torsam, but it is later revealed that Sohrab was behind his death. Before dying, Sher Dil had supported Sarbuland as the next chief. Sarbuland subsequently takes his place. Torsam later kills Mudassir after Mudassir calls Sarbuland and asks him to protect Rabiya. Sarbuland takes Rabiya to the Mansion. Sher Bano initially questions her arrival, but accepts her after Sarbuland explains what happened. Bano takes care of Rabiya and helps her settle into the household. Sohrab secretly works with Sherin, a maid at the Mansion, to remove Sarbuland from his position. Bano discovers Sohrab's plans, but he accidentally kills her while trying to stop her from exposing him. Sohrab and Sherin continue their attempts to kill Sarbuland and involve Zurmand Khan, who has feelings for Sherin. Sherin's involvement is eventually exposed when she tells Noor about their activities. Noor takes her to Sarbuland and Bibi Jaan, where Sherin reveals that she and Sohrab were responsible for poisoning Sher Dil, Bano's death and the attempt to kill Sarbuland through Zurmand. Bibi Jaan suffers a heart attack after hearing the revelations. Torsam overhears Zafraan Khan and Sohrab discussing their plans and discovers that Zafraan had been using him and Gul Meher. He kills Zafraan after learning the truth. Following Zafraan's death, Torsam marries Gul Meher to protect her from another marriage arrangement.

Sohrab returns to the Mansion, where the guards surround him. Zarghoon confronts him with a gun, but Sarbuland stops the confrontation and tells Sohrab that he will have to face the court. Sohrab is sentenced to death. Sherin poisons herself, while Zarghoon's fate remains unknown. Sohrab later kills himself with a piece of broken glass while awaiting his execution. After their marriage, Torsam and Gul Meher begin living together. Bibi Jaan invites Torsam to the Mansion, where they share an emotional reunion. Later, Rabiya sees Torsam while playing hide-and-seek with Umar Daraz, the son of Sohrab and Noor. Frightened by his presence, she runs to Sarbuland and warns him that Torsam has returned. Rabiya takes a gun and tries to shoot Torsam, but Sarbuland stops her. She then hits Torsam and accuses him of murdering Mudassir and ruining her life. Torsam eventually decides to confess to Mudassir's murder and goes to the police station. Meanwhile, Rabiya leaves the Mansion and visits Mudassir's grave. Sarbuland accepts her decision to leave, although both have developed feelings for each other during their time together. Sarbuland later realises his feelings for Rabiya and tries to bring her back. The two eventually reunite at Rabiya's eatery.
