= Banno (TV series) =

Pakistani television series

- Title screen
- Genre: Romance; Soap drama Revenge
- Written by: Tahir Nazir; Athar Ansari
- Directed by: Ali Akbar
- Starring: Furqan Qureshi; Nimra Khan; Farhan Ahmed Malhi; Nawal Saeed; Maryam Noor
- Country of origin: Pakistan
- Original language: Urdu
- No. of seasons: 1
- No. of episodes: 110

Production
- Producers: Abdullah Kadwani; Asad Qureshi
- Running time: 35-42 minutes
- Production company: 7th Sky Entertainment

Original release
- Network: Geo Entertainment
- Release: 29 September 2021 – 2 January 2022

Banno is a 2021 Pakistani soap television serial produced by Abdullah Kadwani and Asad Qureshi under their banner 7th Sky Entertainment. The drama serial is written by Tahir Nazir and Athar Ansari. It features Furqan Qureshi, Nimra Khan, Farhan Ahmed Malhi, Nawal Saeed and Maryam Noor in leading roles. The supporting cast includes Rabia Noreen, Hashim Butt, Seemi Pasha, Khalifa Sajeeruddin, Ayesha Gul, Yasir Alam, Fareeda Shabbir, Naveed Raza and Humaira Bano.

== Plot ==
Omar reaches a point in life where she has to choose between love and friendship. After hiding her long-distance relationship from her dearest cousin for years, Beena still hesitates in disclosing it to Sania when their cousin, Azlan, finally returns to Pakistan. Her reluctance eventually leads to a tragic turn in everyone's life as Sania falls in love with Azlan while their mothers also find them to be a perfect match for marriage.

Being an orphan, Beena lacks the courage to speak her heart out, knowing how much Sania's mother already despises her existence. Beena ends up feeling obliged to prove her loyalty to Sania and sees no point in returning Azlan's phone calls, who had actually promised to make their relationship exclusive.

However, when Nihal's gaze meets Beena's unmarred beauty, he doesn't let anyone stop him from marrying her— not even his disapproving parents. His unconditional love for Beena makes her an easy target for more hatred as his cousin, Ramsha, finds herself more worthy of Nihal's companionship. While Beena struggles for peace in her new home, Azlan refuses to give love another chance.

== Cast ==
=== Main roles ===
- Nimra Khan as Beena
- Furqan Qureshi as Azlan
- Farhan Ahmed Malhi as Nihal
- Nawal Saeed as Sania
- Maryam Noor as Ramsha

=== Supporting roles ===
- Rabia Noreen as Arfah, Sania's mother
- Ayesha Gul as Sajda, Azlan's mother
- Fareeda Shabbir as Ayesha
- Hashim Butt as Karim, Nihal's father
- Seemi Pasha as Riffat, Nihal's mother
- Khalifa Sajeeruddin as Sheheryar, Sania's father
- Humaira Bano as Midhat, Ramsha's mother
- Yasir Alam as Aman, Nihal's friend
- Birjees Farooqui as Sadia's mother, Midhat's friend
- Talia Jan as Abiha, Ramsha's friend
- Naveed Raza as Saqib, Ramsha's friend
- Sohail Sameer as Boss, Beena's boss
- Mehmood Jaffery as Lawyer
- Saba as Nasreen, Riffat's house maid

== Release ==
It premiered on 29 September 2021 and airs daily at 7:00 P.M on Geo Entertainment. It is digitally available to stream on YouTube and in some countries on VIU App.

== Soundtrack ==
The original soundtrack of Banno is sung by Sahir Ali Bagga & Aima Baig. The music is composed by Sahir Ali Bagga on lyrics by M. Mujtaba.
