= Hamzah Tariq Jamil =

Pakistani actor

- Born: Karachi, Pakistan
- Other name: Hamza Tariq Jamil
- Occupation: Actor
- Years active: 2016–2023
- Known for: Meray Dost Meray Yaar

Hamzah Tariq Jamil is a Pakistani theatre and television actor, and singer. Tariq has appeared in several theatre plays and serials including Grease – The Musical, Meri Mishaal, Churails, Mere Baba Ki Ounchi Haveli, Meray Dost Meray Yaar.

== Filmography ==
=== Theatre ===
- Grease The Musical

=== Television ===
Year	Title	Role	Notes
2016	Mere Baba Ki Ounchi Haveli		
2019	Meray Dost Meray Yaar	Mohib	
2020	Meri Mishaal	Adeen	Lead Role
2020	Meray Dost Meray Yaar (season 2)	Mohib	
2020	Nand	Shahzaib	
2022	Aitebaar	Bilal	
2022	Habs	Aamir	
2023-2024	Khumar	Rufi	
2024	Yahya	Shahzaib	Miniseries
2025	Ek Jhooti Kahani		

=== Short film ===
Year	Title	Role	Notes
2021	Dhakka Start		

=== Web ===
Year	Title	Role	Notes
2020	Churails	Naeem	Episode 5; Released on Zee5
