= Woh Pagal Si =

Pakistani television series

- Title screen
- Urdu: وہ پاگل سی
- Genre: Drama; Soap opera
- Written by: Sadia Akhtar
- Directed by: Syed Faisal Bukhari
- Starring: Hira Khan; Omer Shahzad; Saad Qureshi; Zubab Rana; Babar Ali
- Country of origin: Pakistan
- Original language: Urdu
- No. of episodes: 62

Production
- Producers: Humayun Saeed; Shahzad Nasib
- Production location: Karachi
- Running time: 40-44 minutes
- Production company: Six Sigma Plus

Original release
- Network: ARY Digital
- Release: 27 July – 7 October 2022

Woh Pagal Si (Urdu: وہ پاگل سی, transl. She is crazy) is a Pakistani drama series that airs on ARY Digital, written by Sadia Akhtar, directed by Faisal Bukhari and produced by Humayun Saeed and Shahzad Nasib under the banner of Six Sigma Plus. It features Hira Khan, Omer Shahzad, Saad Qureshi, Zubab Rana and Babar Ali in lead roles.

Woh Pagal Si was the highest-rated drama serial of 2022, achieving a TRP Rating of 15.2 (17.9 Avg Content Ratings) and the highest-rated 7:00 P.M slot soap of 2022.

== Plot ==
The story of the play revolves around the life of a girl named Sara. She tries to save her father Ahsan from his second wife Shazma, but she faces many difficulties. She marries Zaheen, son of her driver Sabir. Zaheen loves Sara but she does not want to accept Zaheen's love at first but after some difficulties and sequences of events. She also started loving Zaheen.

== Cast ==
=== Main ===
- Hira Khan as Sara Zaheen Ahmed (nee Ahsan Hayat) : Ahsan's daughter; Bela's sister; Zaheen's wife; Shazma's step-daughter.
- Omer Shahzad as Wahaj Haider : Shazma's boyfriend.
- Zubab Rana as Shazma Ahsan Hayat (nee Mazhar Hussain) : Ahsan's second wife; Zohra and Mazhar's daughter; Bela and Sara's step-mother.
- Saad Qureshi as Zaheen Ahmed : Sabir and Zulekha's son; Anwar's brother; Sara's husband.
- Babar Ali as Ahsan Hayat : Shazma's husband; Bela and Sara's father.

=== Recurring ===
- Zara Ahmed as Bela Sarim (nee Ahsan Hayat) : Ahsan's daughter; Sara's sister; Sarim's wife; Shazma's step-daughter.
- Adnan Saeed as Sarim : Bela's husband.
- Anam Tanveer as Shabana Anwar : Anwar's wife.
- Ismail Tara as Sabir Ahmed : Zaheen and Anwar's father; Zulekha's husband.
- Shazia Gohar as Zulekha Sabir Ahmed : Zaheen and Anwar's mother; Sabir's wife.
- Farah Nadeem as Zohra Mazhar Hussain : Shazma's mother; Mazhar's wife.
- Sohail Masood as Police Officer
- Abdullah Javed as Rumi : Sara's University fellow and ex-boyfriend.
- Birjees Farooqui as Rumi's mother.
- Fouzia Mushtaq as Buaji : Bela and Sara's Guardian.
- Areej Chaudhary as Sajjo : Shabana's sister.
- Talat Shah as Anwar Ahmed : Sabir and Zulekha's son; Zaheen's brother; Shabana's husband.

== Accolades ==
Year	Awards	Category	Nominee	Result	Ref(s).
2023	Lux Style Awards	Best Television Long Play	Woh Pagal Si	Nominated	
