= Qurbatain =

Pakistani television series

- Genre: Romance; Drama
- Written by: Rizwan Ahmad
- Directed by: Kamran Akbar Khan
- Starring: Anmol Baloch; Shahbaz Shigiri; Komal Meer; Ahmad Taha Ghani
- Country of origin: Pakistan
- No. of episodes: 40

Production
- Producer: Momina Duraid
- Production company: Momina Duraid Productions

Original release
- Network: Hum TV
- Release: 6 July – 23 November 2020

Qurbatain (Urdu: قربتیں, lit. 'Proximity') is a Pakistani drama serial that aired on Hum TV in 2020. The serial is directed by Kamran Akbar Khan, written by Rizwan Ahmad, and produced by Momina Duraid Productions. lt stars Anmol Baloch, Shahbaz Shigri, Komal Meer, and Ahmad Taha Ghani.

== Plot ==
The story revolves around two companions, Zamal Areeba. Zamal belongs to a wealthy family, whereas Areeba belongs to a white-collar class family. Areeba, and Zamal are best friends until an attractive person turns into the explanation of their conflicts. Faaris marries Areeba and Zamal didn't know about this. Faaris also marries Zamal on her parents wish. Zamal asked Areeba to marry her brother Rohaan. Areeba gets engaged to Rohaan. Later on, Rohaan's best friend Rafail gets to know that Areeba and Faaris are married. He invites Rohaan to his house, and when they both are in the car, they catch Areeba with Faaris. When Zamal's gets to know that Faaris is married with her best friend Areeba, she gets dishearted. In the last episodes, Areeba leaves Faaris and stays in the house of her cousin. Faaris returns to his parents house while Areeba's cousin leaves Areeba and also leaves Pakistan.

== Cast ==
- Anmol Baloch as Areeba
- Shahbaz Shigiri as Faaris
- Komal Meer as Zamal
- Ahmad Taha Ghani as Rohaan
- Areej Mohyudin as Sadia
- Zain Afzal as Rafail
- Kashif Mehmood as Waaris
- Laila Zuberi as Munazzah
- Abbas Ashraf Awan as Khurram
- Munazzah Arif as Shumaila
- Tahira Imam as mother of Areeba and Sadia
- Laiba Sarfaraz as Manahil

== Production ==
The production location of the serial was Islamabad.
