= Mann Mast Malang =

2025 Pakistani television series

- من مست ملنگ
- Genre: Drama; Romance
- Written by: Nooran Makhdoom
- Directed by: Ali Faizan
- Starring: Danish Taimoor; Sahar Hashmi
- Opening theme: "Wafaon Kay Badlay" by Khalid Khan and Saba Butt
- Composer: Yasir Ali
- Country of origin: Pakistan
- Original language: Urdu
- No. of seasons: 1
- No. of episodes: 53

Production
- Executive producer: Asad Qureshi
- Producer: Abdullah Kadwani
- Production locations: Karachi, Pakistan
- Camera setup: Multi-camera setup
- Running time: 40 minutes
- Production company: 7th Sky Entertainment

Original release
- Network: Geo Entertainment
- Release: February 21 – June 29, 2025

Mann Mast Malang is a 2025 Pakistani romantic drama television series that premiered on Geo Entertainment on 21 February 2025. It is produced by Abdullah Kadwani and Asad Qureshi under 7th Sky Entertainment. It stars Danish Taimoor and Sahar Hashmi in leads along with Saba Hameed, Uzma Hassan, Adnan Samad Khan and Maha Hasan in supporting roles. The series surpassed one billion views on YouTube during its original run.

The series revolved around Kabeer and Riya, former fiancés turned enemies, start to grow closer and eventually fall in love. They face the challenge of uniting their feuding families as they strive to make their love successful against all odds.

== Premise ==
The story follows Kabir Khan (Danish Taimoor) and Riya (Sahar Hashmi), whose engagement is disrupted by family conflicts, leading them to become adversaries. Over time, circumstances bring them back together, forcing them to confront their past and reconsider their relationship.

== Plot ==
Business rivals Mubeen Khan and Sikandar Khan have been entangled in a long-standing family feud. Caught in the crossfire are Kabir and Riya, former childhood fiancés who have now become bitter adversaries. Following his release from jail, Sikandar Khan encounters yet another setback. Meanwhile, Kabir makes a life-altering decision and unknowingly crosses paths with Riya, oblivious to her true identity. Kabir instantly falls in love with Riya—who, unbeknownst to him, is the sister of his greatest enemy, Sikandar. With Wajid's help, Sikandar destroy Kabir's most treasured belonging. Meanwhile, Mah Bina visits Riya's house with a marriage proposal for Kabir. Kabir is shattered when he learns that the girl he loves is actually his sworn enemy's sister. Meanwhile, Sikandar endures yet another humiliation at the hands of Mubeen and Kabir.

Kabir confronts Riya with his deep resentment, but fate takes an unexpected turn when he ends up saving her life—only for her to misinterpret his actions. Seeking safety, Riya takes shelter in Kabir's home, but later, she accuses him of abduction, resulting in his arrest. Riya eventually has a change of heart, leading to Kabir's unexpected release. However, he becomes determined to uncover the true culprit behind her attempted abduction. Fueled by her resentment toward Kabir, Riya refuses his academic assistance, while Kashaf willingly accepts it. Their contrasting outcomes put Riya in a difficult situation. Despite facing his own challenges, Kabir steps in to defend a stranger from Faraz. Feeling disgraced, Faraz plots revenge, using Riya as a pawn against Kabir. Kabir crashes Faraz's birthday party and takes Riya away to warn her about Faraz's intentions, but she refuses to believe him. On her wedding day, Faraz kidnaps Riya with a sinister plan in motion. In his attempt to rescue her, Kabir unknowingly walks into Faraz's trap.

After surviving a gunshot, Kabir ends up in the hospital. Determined to see him, Riya takes a huge risk, deceiving her family to visit him in secret. Just as Wajid is about to kill Kabir, Riya arrives and intervenes. In the ensuing chaos, Wajid flees, leaving his true identity a mystery. Riya faces increasing pressure from her family to marry, while Kabir demands a risky favor to test her loyalty, and Riya boldly accepts the challenge. Kabir struggles with his feelings for Riya. Meanwhile, Riya, desperate to escape marriage and pass her exams, turns to Kabir for help. Kabir agrees to tutor Riya to help her pass her exams. However, when Wafa unexpectedly sees them together, it raises new suspicions and doubts. During their study sessions, Kabir and Riya clash in a heated argument, but they eventually resolve their differences and find common ground. Kabir angers Mah Bina by bringing Minha, Wafa's sister, to their home. Tensions escalate when he gives a major contract to Sikandar, Mubeen's bitter rival, deepening the divide. Wafa conspires to marry Kabir to Minha in an attempt to seize control of the house. Kabir, in turn, accepts Riya's bold challenge to visit her home and follows through.

In a fit of rage upon seeing Kabir at her home, Asma pulls the trigger. In a shocking moment, Riya steps in front of him and takes the bullet instead. Haunted by his past with Asma, Mubeen warns Kabir to stay away from Riya. Meanwhile, Asma grows nervous when she realizes her pistol is missing, unaware that Wajid now possesses it. As Wafa continues plotting to marry Kabir to Minha as revenge on Mah Bina, Riya heartbreakingly rejects Kabir's love, fearing that being with her would put his life in danger. Kabir and Riya remain torn by their growing feelings. To continue tutoring her, Kabir challenges Riya to visit his home, and she bravely accepts the challenge. Then, she visits his home. Mah Bina becomes increasingly concerned as Kabir continues to openly support for Riya. Meanwhile, Asma starts noticing changes in Riya's behavior and suspects that she might be in love with someone. Acting on Wafa's advice, Minha begins attending to Mah Bina and attempts to grow closer to Kabir. At the same time, Mah Bina intensifies her efforts to find a suitable bride for him. Riya, devastated, confronts Kabir, who presents her with a firm ultimatum. Unwilling to back down, she secretly leaves her home to meet him. Their meeting is discovered by Asma and Mah Bina, igniting tension and conflict within both families. Despite the uproar, Kabir and Riya remain committed to each other. Meanwhile, Minha takes advantage of the turmoil, attempting to drive a wedge between them and bringing their relationship to the edge of breakdown. Riya faces insult at Kabir's house, but Kabir has no idea what's happening. Feeling heartbroken and betrayed, Riya confronts him and gives a dangerous warning. Kabir takes Mah Bina to Riya's house, but things get out of control when Sikandar finds out about Riya's love for Kabir. Emotions explode, and both families get shaken by shocking truths and growing tensions.

Riya is tied by her family's restrictions, and Mah Bina doesn't support Kabir's love either. Riya's family arranges her engagement, but Kabir decides to stop it and fight for their love. After Kabir breaks Riya's engagement, Sikandar and Asma go to Mubeen and Mah Bina with a surprising request, which they unwillingly accept. Kabir and Riya decide to run away, but just when they are about to escape, both Khan families catch them. This leads to a big face-off and even more tension. Under Wajid's influence, Asma tricks Riya and turns her against Kabir. Kabir becomes determined to find out who is creating problems between their families for personal benefit.

Following Asma's plan, Riya's family brings her marriage proposal to Kabir's house, but Kabir doesn't know it's all part of a hidden scheme. After Asma and Sikandar agree to Mah Bina's conditions, Kabir and Riya get married. Kabir is very happy, but Riya feels confused and emotionally upset. On the wedding night, Riya leaves Kabir and goes back to her home. Kabir doesn't expect this and is shocked when Riya asks for a divorce. Kashaf tells Riya to realize Asma's conspiracy, while Kabir stands strong in his love and refuses to give up, even under pressure from his own family. Just when Asma and Sikandar think they have won, Kabir fights back. They both get arrested, and Riya ends up at Kabir's house. Kabir brings Riya to his house and goes against his family's wishes by refusing to let her leave. He even ties her up to keep her with him. Sikandar and Asma make a plan to bring Riya back, but before they can do anything, Kabir takes a shocking step that surprises everyone. Kabir secretly takes Riya to a hidden place, leaving both families unaware of their whereabouts. Meanwhile, Wafa takes a risky step to stop Mubeen from marrying again. Kabir tries his best to remove Riya's doubts and win back her trust. Wafa feels broken when Mubeen decides to support Mah Bina's choice instead of hers. Kabir and Riya reach court just in time to save their marriage, and then return to their separate homes. Wafa starts losing hope in Mubeen as he continues to follow Mah Bina's orders. Riya finally stands up to Asma and gives her a strong and deserving reply.

Sikandar and Asma's lives are turned upside down when they find out that Kabir has secretly bought their mortgaged house, gaining full control and power over them. Kabir returns something very valuable to Riya, which helps rebuild her trust. Tensions rise as Asma and Sikandar start blaming each other for everything going wrong. Kabir's presence in their house starts to irritate Sikandar and Asma. Wafa takes another dangerous step in her desperate effort to stop Mubeen from marrying again. Riya finally decides to shift permanently to Kabir's house, which leaves Sikandar completely defeated. At the same time, Wafa narrowly avoids being exposed for the risky move she made to stop Mubeen's second marriage.

== Cast ==
The cast includes:

- Danish Taimoor as Kabir Khan
  - Harmain Ghalib as young Kabir Khan
- Sahar Hashmi as Riya Khan
  - Aayat Arif as young Riya Khan
- Nayyar Ejaz as Chacha
- Saba Hameed as Mah Bina
- Kamran Jilani as Mubeen Khan
- Uzma Hassan as Asma
- Adnan Samad Khan as Sikandar Khan
- Madiha Rizvi as Khala (special appearance)
- Hiba Ali Khan as Wafa
- Dodi Khan as Wajid
- Ramiz Siddiqui as Rameez
- Yasir Alam as Yasir
- Sheherzade Noor Peerzada as Kashaf
- Maha Hasan as Minha
- Faisal Bali as Bhola
- Sharif Baloch as Inspector

== Soundtrack ==
Mann Mast Malang

Soundtrack album by Khalid Khan and Saba Butt
- Released: 19 February 2025
- Recorded: 2025
- Genre: Romantic music
- Length: 3:34
- Language: Urdu
- Label: Geo Entertainment
- Producers: Abdullah Kadwani; Asad Qureshi
External media
Audio
- Audio on iTunes
Video
- Music video on YouTube

The original soundtrack (OST) is performed by Khalid Khan and Saba Butt, with music composed by Yasir Ali, arranged by Ahsan Abbas, and mixed/mastered by Afzal Hussain. The OST was released on 19 February 2025 by Har Pal Geo.

== Production ==
The series is produced by the television Production banner 7th Sky Entertainment. Danish Taimoor and Sahar Hashmi made their first on-screen collaboration in the television series. The first teaser was released on 7 February 2025 and the first premiered on 21 February 2025 on Geo Entertainment.

=== Release ===
The series premiered on 21 February 2025 on Geo Entertainment.

== Reception ==
The series received attention for its lead performances and storyline. Danish Taimoor and Sahar Hashmi's on-screen pairing was noted, and the drama gained viewership following its premiere of first episode.

A review at Dawn concluded: "Lavish sets, a strong but under-utilised star cast and two-dimensional character sketches give us a very Indianised show that is determined to entertain and avoid too much thinking. Despite his credentials as a good performer, Danish Taimoor seems to be stuck in the groove of playing a rogue male on a rampage, again and again… and yet again." A review of episode 6 on Trending Social mentioned that the actor's fans too expressed the same concern about the lack of novelty of his role.

A very mixed review at Images/Dawn wrote, "The drama makes us want to laugh rather than cry. Whether this ‘Romeo and Juliet’ will eventually be given a tragic ending remains to be seen. There is a possibility, however, that when that happens the weary viewer will let out a sigh of relief that it is all finally over."

Gulf News calls Mann Mast Malang a rising hit in Pakistani television, praising its storyline, performances, and growing social media buzz.

=== Ban in India ===
Following the Pahalgam attack in April 2025, where militants targeted and killed 26 civilians, the Indian government intensified scrutiny of cross-border content. In the aftermath, India banned 16 Pakistani YouTube channels including Har Pal Geo, where the Indian viewers watched the television series. Consequently, some Pakistani dramas, including Mann Mast Malang, became less accessible on Indian digital platforms. Fans expressed disappointment over these restrictions, citing the impact on cultural exchange and entertainment access.

== See also ==
- List of programs broadcast by Geo Entertainment
