= Benaam (TV series) =

Pakistani television family series

- Genre: Soap opera; Family drama
- Written by: Seema Sheikh; Tahir Nazeer
- Directed by: Ali Masud Saeed
- Starring: Noor Hassan Rizvi; Anoushay Abbasi; Komal Meer; Saad Qureshi; Babar Ali; Nadia Hussain; Imran Aslam; Shazeal Shoukat
- Opening theme: "Benaam Si Mohabbat" by Shafqat Amanat Ali
- Country of origin: Pakistan
- Original language: Urdu
- No. of episodes: 62

Production
- Producers: Humayun Saeed; Shahzad Nasib
- Production location: Karachi
- Camera setup: Multi-camera setup
- Running time: 37-53 minutes
- Production company: Six Sigma Plus

Original release
- Network: ARY Digital
- Release: November 2, 2021 – January 2, 2022

Benaam (Urdu: بےنام, lit. 'Nameless') is a Pakistani television family soap series that originally aired on ARY Digital from 2 November 2021 to 2 January 2022. It is produced by Humayun Saeed and Shahzad Nasib under Six Sigma Plus. It stars Komal Meer, Noor Hassan Rizvi, Anoushay Abbasi, Shazeal Shoukat, Babar Ali, Nadia Hussain, Imran Aslam and Saad Qureshi in lead roles. The story revolves around the ill treatment and hardships faced by twin sisters Aiza and Aimal, who lives with their step-father despite having a real father, who left them before they were born.

== Cast ==
- Noor Hassan Rizvi as Haider; husband of Aiza and brother in law to Aimal
- Anoushay Abbasi as Aimal; Umar Second Wife
- Komal Meer as Aiza; Wife of Haider
- Saad Qureshi as Umar; Tooba and Aimal 's husband
- Shazeal Shoukat as Laiba
- Babar Ali as Taimoor; father of Aimal, Aiza and Laiba
- Nadia Hussain as Rabia; wife of Taimoor mother to Laiba and stepmother to Aimal and Aiza
- Imran Aslam as Babar
- Humaira Bano as Haider's mother
- Shazia Gohar as Umar's mother
- Ghana Ali as Umar's elder sister
- Anam Tanveer as Umar's elder sister
- Minna Tariq as Tooba; wife of Umar
- Fawad Jalal as Umar's brother-in-law
- Humaira Asghar as Maham
- Sara Malik as Bajo (Umar and Tooba's eldest sister)
- Zeeshan Khan
- Shariq Hussain
- Waseem Abbas as Aimal and Aiza's adoptive father (Guest appearance)

== Reception ==
The drama received a TRP rating as high as 10.9 in its time slot.

=== Lux Style Awards ===
Ceremony	Categories	Recipients	Result
21st Lux Style Awards	Best TV Long Play	Benaam	Nominated
