= Komal Meer =

Pakistani actress

- Born: Islamabad, Pakistan
- Occupation: Actress
- Years active: 2019–present

Komal Meer is a Pakistani television actress. Making her acting debut in 2018, Meer rose to prominence with the supporting character of Rameen in Momina Duraid and ISPR's Ehd-e-Wafa and subsequently played the leading roles in Resham Gali Ki Husna (2019–20), Benaam (2021–22) Qalandar (2022–23) and Tere Aany Se (2023).

== Career ==
In 2022, she appeared as a rural innocent girl called Dur-e-Adan opposite Muneeb Butt in Geo Entertainment's Qalandar. In 2023, she appeared in Geo TV's Ramadan special Tere Aany Se playing the character of Rania where she made her second on-screen appearance with Muneeb Butt after Qalandar.

== Filmography ==
=== Television ===
Year	Title	Role	Network	Notes
2019	Log Kia Kahengay	Shiza Javed	Hum TV	
2019	Resham Gali Ki Husna	Husna	Hum TV	
2019	Ehd-e-Wafa	Rameen Faraz	Hum TV	
2020	Qurbatain	Zamal	Hum TV	
2021	Wafa Be Mol	Hania	Hum TV	
2021–22	Benaam	Aiza	ARY Digital	
2022	Badshah Begum	Roshan Ara	Hum TV	
2022	Wehshi	Sobia	Hum TV	
2022	Qalandar	Durr-e-Adan	Geo Entertainment	
2023	Tere Aany Se	Rania	Geo Entertainment	Ramzan Special
2023	Dhoka	Komal	ARY Digital	
