= Saad Qureshi (actor) =

Pakistani actor

- Born: Multan, Punjab, Pakistan
- Education: BBA
- Alma mater: York University
- Occupations: Actor; Model
- Years active: 2015–present
- Spouse: Misha Chaudhry (m. 2019)

Saad Qureshi is a Pakistani actor, known for his roles in Pakistani television serials including Pukaar (2018), Ki Jaana Main Kaun (2018) and Mehboob Aapke Qadmon Main (2019) and Woh Pagal Si (2022).

Qureshi started an online child sponsorship program that is engaged in extending fundamental human rights to the next generation.

== Early life and education ==
The youngest of four brothers, Qureshi was born in Multan, Punjab and grew up in Islamabad, later moving to Canada to study business at Toronto's York University. After graduation Qureshi joined his family business in Lahore.

== Career ==
He started his acting career through a talent hunt conducted by Geo Entertainment in 2015. His first role was in television series Khuda Aur Mohabbat season 2 after which Qureshi worked in several dramas including Ghairat (2017) and Shadi Mubarak Ho (2017) for ARY Digital.

He is best known for his role in serial Pukaar (2018).

In 2018, Qureshi worked for Hum TV in Ki Jaana Main Kaun.

In 2019, he appeared as main lead in Meer Abru and Mehboob Apke Qadmon Main. The later of which earned him critical acclaim.

== Personal life ==
He got engaged to dental surgeon Misha Chaudhry in August 2018 and married her in December 2019.

== Filmography ==
=== Television serials ===
Year	Title	Role	Network	Notes
2016	Wafa	Umair	Geo Entertainment	
2016	Khuda Aur Mohabbat Season 2	Kamran	Geo Entertainment	
2017	Ghairat	Kashif	ARY Digital	
2017	Shadi Mubarak Ho	Bilal	ARY Digital	
2018	Pukaar	Fahad Sultan	ARY Digital	
2018	Ki Jaana Main Kaun	Taimoor Ansari	Hum TV	
2019	Meer Abru	Waleed Murad	Hum TV	
2019	Mehboob Apke Qadmon Main	Arsim	Hum TV	
2020	Mera Maan Rakhna	Asad	TV One	
2021	Sitam	Salman	Hum TV	
2021	Benaam	Umer	ARY Digital	
2022	Makafaat Season 4	Kamran	Geo Entertainment	
2022	Woh Pagal Si	Zaheen	ARY Digital	
2022	Mamlaat	Faiq	Geo Entertainment	
2023	Jinzada	Adnan	Geo Entertainment	
2023	Mein Kahani Hun	Fahkar	Express Entertainment	
2023	Adawat	Rehan	ARY Digital	
2023	Serial Killer	Sikander	Green Entertainment	Extended cameo
2024	Nasihat	Asim	Green Entertainment	
2024	Bismil	Moosa	ARY Digital	
2024	BOL Kahani	Hanan	BOL Network	
2025	Ae Dil	Mohid	ARY Digital	
2025	Aik Lafz Zindagi	Taimoor	Geo Entertainment	
2026	Tapish	Maaz	Geo Entertainment	

=== Short film ===
Year	Title	Role	Notes
2021	House No. 242	Asher	Released on digital platform See Prime

=== Telefilm ===
Year	Title	Role	Notes
2019	In Se Miliye	Owais	
2023	Yeh Tou Too Much Ho Gaya	Haroon	Released on Geo Entertainment

=== Web series ===
Year	Title	Role	Notes
2024	Abdullahpur Ka Devdas	Bedaar	Zee Zindagi
2024	Fatima Jinnah Vol 1	Samiullah Kowaishi	Upcoming
