= Sharpasand =

Pakistani television series

- Written by: Sara Sadain Shah
- Directed by: Aehsun Talish
- Starring: Naumaan Ijaz; Nadia Afgan; Hira Mani; Affan Waheed; Hareem Farooq; Seemi Pasha; Ahsan Afzal Khan; Sabahat Sheikh; Hassam Irfan; Saba Bukhari
- Country of origin: Pakistan
- Original language: Urdu
- No. of seasons: 1
- No. of episodes: 52

Production
- Producer: Abdullah Seja
- Running time: Approximately 38–40 minutes
- Production company: iDream Entertainment

Original release
- Network: ARY Digital
- Release: 8 October 2025 – 2 April 2026

Sharpasand (also spelled SharPasand) is a Pakistani television drama series that aired on ARY Digital from 8 October 2025 to 2 April 2026. The series was directed by Aehsun Talish, written by Sara Sadain Shah and produced by Abdullah Seja under the banner of iDream Entertainment. It stars Naumaan Ijaz, Nadia Afgan, Hira Mani, Affan Waheed and Hareem Farooq in prominent roles.

The story revolves around Farasat Ali, a seemingly respectable neighbourhood resident who interferes in the lives of people around him through gossip, manipulation and deceit. His actions affect several households, including those of Shazmain, a widowed working woman, and the married couple Sanam and Fida, whose relationship faces difficulties. The drama explores themes of social judgement, moral policing, family relationships and the consequences of spreading rumours.

== Cast ==
- Naumaan Ijaz as Farasat Ali
- Nadia Afgan as Rubina (Ruby)
- Hira Mani as Shazmain
- Affan Waheed as Fida
- Hareem Farooq as Sanam
- Ahsan Afzal Khan as Wali
- Saba Bukhari as Minahil
- Sabahat Sheikh as Hafsa
- Hassam Irfan as Hammad
- Seemi Pasha as Begum Ali
- Sarah Aijaz Khan
- Zuni Sheikh
- Falak Naeem
- Shahista Jabeen

== Reception ==
The series received coverage from Pakistani newspapers and entertainment publications during and after its broadcast.

In December 2025, Dawn published a behind-the-scenes feature highlighting the drama's neighbourhood setting, ensemble cast and production design. The article also discussed the director's decision to construct a detailed residential street for filming.

In February 2026, The Express Tribune discussed the drama's portrayal of neighbourhood gossip and moral policing, focusing on Farasat Ali as a male figure who exercises social influence through rumours and manipulation.

In a review published in May 2026, Images described the series as a drama about deception, interference and emotional manipulation. The review praised the performances of Naumaan Ijaz, Nadia Afgan, Hareem Farooq and Hira Mani, while criticising the slow pacing and certain narrative inconsistencies.
