= Anam Tanveer =

Pakistani television host, actress

- انعم تنویر
- Born: 8 February 1990; Karachi, Pakistan
- Education: MBA in Marketing
- Alma mater: SZABIST
- Occupation(s): Actress, model, TV host & writer
- Years active: 2011–present
- Awards: Youth Icon of the Year Award 2016

Anam Tanveer (Urdu: انعم تنویر) is a Pakistani model, actress, and TV host. She made her acting debut with a supporting role in the 2012 series Meray Dard Ko Jo Zuban Miley and has since then appeared in television series including Joru Ka Ghulam (2014), Behkay Kadam (2014), Shehrnaz (2016), Waada (2016), and Jaal (2019).

== Career ==
Her performance was praised for the role of Fareeha in ARY Digital's Do Bol. She was nominated for Best Supporting Actress for a TV serial she did in 2017 (Noor-e-Zindegi) at the IPPA awards London (based on her 2016 performance). She played the antagonist in Mera Dil Mera Dushman (2020 ).

== Filmography ==
=== Television series ===
Year	Title	Role	Network	Refs
2011	Dum Dum Dee Dee	Host	PTV Home	
2012	Meray Dard Ko Jo Zuban Miley	Samreen	Hum TV	
2013	Behkay kadam	Saba	Express TV	
2013	Madventures	Participant	ARY Digital	
2014	Joru Ka Ghulam	Pinky	Hum TV	
2015	Bhaabhi	Summan	ARY Digital	
2016	Dil e Barbad	Haniya	ARY Digital	
2016	Kitni Girhain Baaki Hain 2	Sana	Hum TV	
2016	Waada	Lubna	ARY Digital	
2016	Bahu Raniyan	Hiba	Express Entertainment	
2016	Shehrnaz		Urdu1	
2017	Mazaaq Raat	Herself	Dunya News	
2018	Baydardi	Dr. Ayesha	ARY Digital	
2018–present	Jalebi	Neelum	ARY Digital	
2018	Lashkara	Kiran	ARY Digital	
2019	Jaal	Sherina	Hum TV	
2019	Do Bol	Fareeha (Gaiti's aunt)	ARY Digital	
2019-2020	Tera Yahan Koi Nahin	Rubi	Hum TV	
2020	Mera Dil Mera Dushman	Shaheena	ARY Digital	
2020	Raaz-e-Ulfat	Bano	Geo TV	
2020	Shokhiyaan	Shereen	Geo TV	
2020	Tasveer	Farwa	Play Entertainment TV	
2021	Shehnai	Beena	Ary Digital	
2021	Teri Behisi	Hira	Geo TV	
2021	Aakhir Kab Tak	Rubab	Hum TV	
2021	Benaam (TV series)	Ayesha	Ary Digital	
2022	Saaya 2	Areesha	Geo Entertainment	
2022	Woh Pagal Si	Shabana	ARY Digital	
2023	Meher Ma	Dr.Rimsha	Express Entertainment	
2023	Mannat Murad	Sitara	Geo Entertainment	
2023	Adawat	Sobia	ARY Digital	
2024	Teray Janay Kay Baad	Hira	ARY Digital	
2024	Tamasha 3	Herself	Ary Digital	

=== Film ===
- Glass Tora Bara Aana (2018)
- Masoom Si Bholi Bhali Si (2019)
- Khalda Aur Walda (2017)
- Ek Aur Munafiq (2020)
- Dikhawa Season 3 - Doosra Chehra, (2022)
