= Sidra Niazi =

Pakistani actress and model

- Born: Lahore, Pakistan
- Occupations: Actress; journalist; model
- Years active: 2017 – present

Sidra Niazi is a Pakistani actress and model. She is known for her work in various television dramas, commercials and telefilms, including roles in Sukoon and Samjhota on ARY Digital.

== Career ==
Her work includes significant roles in the dramas Jhoom, Zakham and Mujhe Qubool Nahi on Geo Entertainment. She wishes to host a show on social issues and write about them to spread awareness.

== Filmography ==
=== Television series ===
Year	Title	Role	Network	Notes
2021	Qayamat	Urooj		
2021	Chupke Chupke	Hania Amjad		
2021	Makafaat Season 3	Samreen		
2021	Dikhawa Season 2	Faria		
2022	Badzaat	Qandeel		
2022	Dikhawa Season 3	Saba		
2022	Dil Zaar Zaar	Laiba		
2022	Makafaat Season 4	Zunaira		
2022	Zakham	Aimen		
2022	Inaam-e-Mohabbat	Munizay		
2023	Samjhota	Alizeh		
2023	Jhoom	Mehwish		
2023	Tumhare Husn Ke Naam	Muneeza		
2023	Khushbo Mein Basay Khat	Parveen		
2023	Tere Aany Se	Bibbo		
2023	Mujhay Qabool Nahin	Mishaal		
2023	Sukoon	Shanzay		
2023	Dhoka	Natasha		
2024	Rishtey	Yumna		
2024	Bharam			
2024	Mehshar	Paras	Geo Entertainment	
2025	BOL Kahani	Naina	BOL Network	
2025	Masoom	Laila	Hum TV	
2025	Jinn Ki Shadi Unki Shadi	Zara	Hum TV	
2025	Sanwal Yaar Piya	Sassi	Geo Entertainment	
2026	Muamma	Ayeza	Hum TV	Co-star: Saba Qamar.

=== Telefilm ===
Year	Title	Role	Notes
2019	Laal	Zarminay's mother	
2021	Dadi Ka Damad	Mona	
2021	Tameez Uddin Ki Badtameez Family	Noreen	
2022	Pyar Mubarak	Sara	
2022	Love Life Ka Law	Sidra	

=== Short film ===
Year	Title	Role	Notes
2021	Pehli Waali	Palwashay	Opposite Omair Rana and Juggan Kazim in lead

=== Film ===
Year	Title	Role	Notes
2017	Chalay Thay Saath	Resham's mother	
