= Roag (2022 TV series) =

Pakistani television series

- Genre: Drama
- Written by: Huma Hina Nafees
- Directed by: Misbah Khalid
- Starring: Adeel Chaudhary; Areej Mohyudin; Arez Ahmed
- Country of origin: Pakistan
- Original language: Urdu
- No. of episodes: 47

Production
- Producer: Momina Duraid
- Production company: MD Productions

Original release
- Network: Hum TV
- Release: 21 February – 26 April 2022

Roag is a 2022 Pakistani television drama serial produced by Moomal Productions and directed by Misbah Khalid. It features Adeel Chaudhary, Areej Mohyudin and Arez Ahmed in lead roles.

== Synopsis ==
A tale revolving around the ongoing predicament of feudalism and Muskaan, a girl like many that suffers at the hands of it. Muskaan faces a series of trials and tribulations simply due to her gender and rises above them towards independence and empowerment.

== Cast ==
- Adeel Chaudhary as Shazeb: ex-husband of Tabassum and husband of Muskaan. Cousin of Rehan, Liaba, Alishba and Muskaan.
- Areej Mohyudin as Muskaan: widow of Rehan and wife of Shazeb
- Arez Ahmed as Rehan: Muskaan's former husband. Cousin of Shahzeb.
- Babar Ali as Bilal: Muskaan's father. Qamar Jahan's eldest brother
- Saima Qureshi as Qamar Jahan: Bilal's sister. Muskaan, Rehan and Shahzeb's aunt.
- Manzoor Qureshi as Bilal's and Qamar Jahan's father
- Hafsa Tariq Butt as Laiba: Sister to Alishba and Rehan. Ibad's wife.
- Mariam Tiwana as Alishba: sister of Liaba and Rehan. widower of Anas
- Raima Khan as Tabassum, former wife of Shazeb
- Kasim Khan as Anas Abbas: Alishba's husband. Rehan and Muskaan's University friend
- Tabbasum Arif as Anas' mother & Alisba's former mother-in-law
- Subhan Awan as Ibad
- Adnan Jillani
- Salma Asim
