= Adeel Chaudhry =

Pakistani singer-songwriter and actor

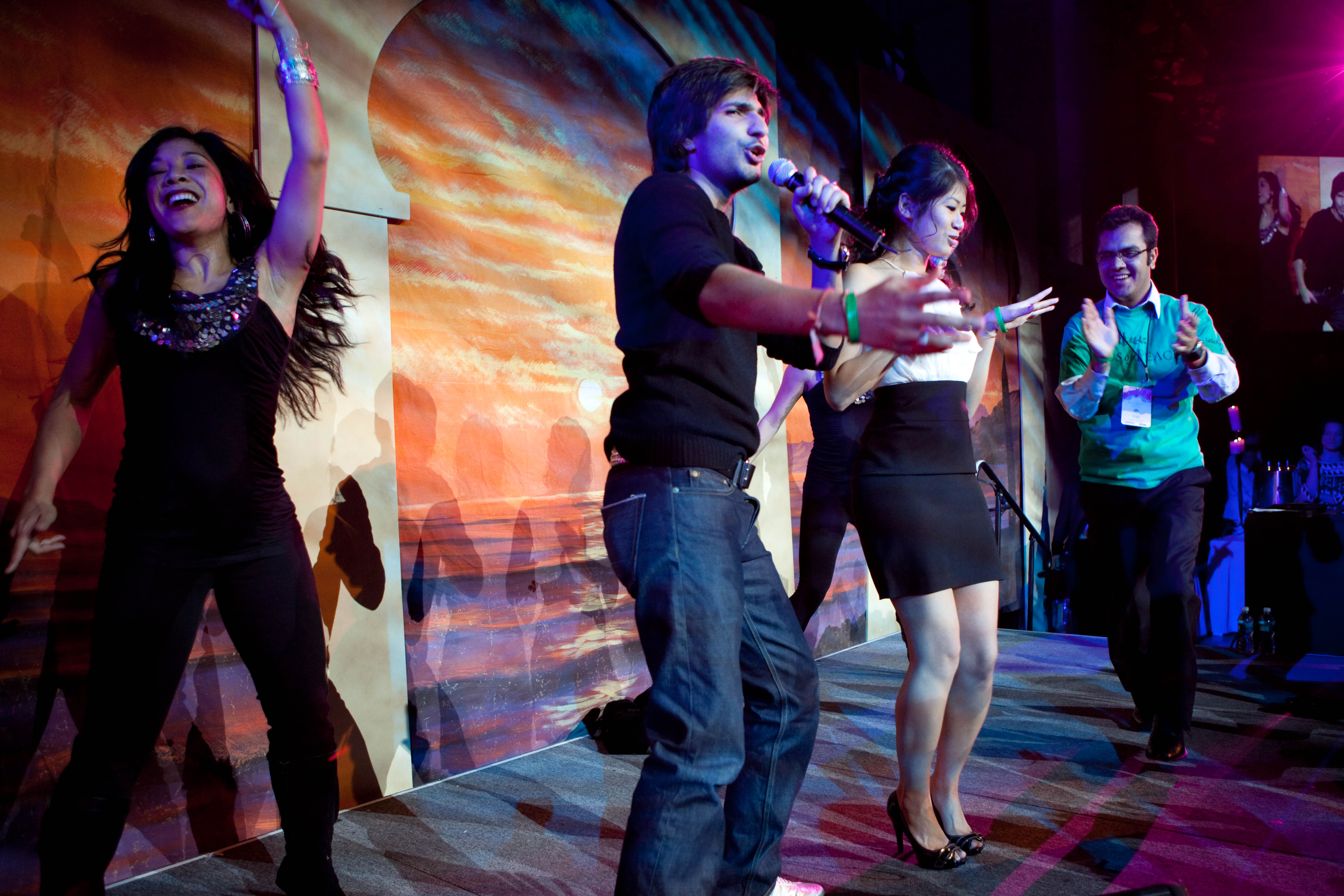
- Adeel Chaudhry performing in New York in 2009
- Born: Adeel Chaudhry; Toronto, Ontario, Canada
- Education: King Edward Medical University
- Occupations: Actor; Singer-songwriter; Model; Dentist; Pilot
- Years active: 2008–present
- Height: 1.80 m (5 ft 11 in)
- Relatives: Fazal Ilahi Chaudhry (grandfather)
- Musical career
- Genres: Pop
- Instrument: Vocals
- Years active: 2007–present
- Label: Tips Industries Limited

Adeel Chaudhry is a Pakistani-Canadian actor and singer-songwriter. He has worked in Hindi and Urdu films and television. Adeel has also released two studio albums.

== Career ==
=== Model ===
Adeel began his career as a model, featuring in television commercials for Pepsi in India. In 2015, he appeared in a television commercial with Shah Rukh Khan for the tobacco brand Pan Parag.

=== Actor ===
Following a theater play called Kukar, Adeel made his debut as a television actor by appearing in the Pakistani serial Yeh Zindagi Hai in 2008.

In 2014, Adeel appeared in the Bollywood horror film Bhaangarh, which was released on 5 September 2014. He appeared in the romantic-musical film Rhythm (2016), his proper Bollywood debut. The dapper hero starred alongside Komal Aziz in Pakistani drama series Bharosa Pyar Tera, which became a highly rated drama during its run in 2019.

=== Musician ===
in 2008, he signed to Tips Industries Limited. Adeel also sang Move Your Body for the 2008 Bollywood film Kismat Konnection, which won the MTV Popular Choice Award.

He released his debut album Koi Chehra in 2009 under Tips. He released his second album Raat Ruk Jaa in 2013.

== Filmography ==
=== Television serials ===
Year	Serial	Role	Network	Notes
2008	Yeh Zindagi Hai	Kamal AKA Kam	Geo Entertainment	
2014	Kaisay Tum Se Kahoon	Mansoor	Hum TV	
2014	Dharkan	Zaaran	Hum TV	
2014	Hiddat	Adnan	Geo Entertainment	
2014	Dil-e-Bekhabar	Moiz	A Plus TV	
2015	Zinda Dargor		ARY Digital	
2018–2019	Yeh Ishq Hai	Samir		Episode: "Sirf Tum"
2018–2019	Mohabbat Karna Mana Hai	Ibad	Bol Entertainment	
2019	Bharosa Pyar Tera	Mikaal	Geo Entertainment	
2020	Munafiq	Armaan	Geo Entertainment	
2020	Bandhay Aik Dor Say	Nabeel	Geo Entertainment	
2020	Uraan	Asim	Geo Entertainment	
2020–2021	Main Agar Chup Hoon	Ahad	Geo Entertainment	
2020–2021	Faryaad	Haroon	ARY Digital	
2021	Fasiq	Mutahir	Geo Entertainment	
2022	Roag	Shazeb	Hum TV	
2022–2023	Farq	Daniyaal	Geo Entertainment	
2023	Samjhota	Asad	ARY Digital	
2024	Ghaata	Hamza	Geo TV	

=== Films ===
Year	Title	Role	Country
2014	Bhaangarh	Shakti	India
2016	Rhythm	Rohan	India
2018	Maan Jao Naa	Faris	Pakistan

== Discography ==
=== Studio albums ===
Year	Album	Label
2009	Koi Chehra	Tips
2013	Raat Ruk Jaa	Tips

== See also ==
- List of Pakistani actors
- List of Bollywood actors
