= Dikhawa =

Pakistani anthology soap series

- دکھاوا
- Genre: Drama series; Family drama; Social drama
- Written by: Mansoor Saeed; Amber Azhar; Samina Ejaz; Nabeela Raja; Shabnam Sani; Aamrah Shahid; Rabia Mohsin; Ramla Salma; Faraz Mazaher
- Directed by: Ali Akber
- Starring: Neelam Muneer; Ali Ansari; Mehmood Aslam; Saba Faisal; Hina Altaf; Omer Shahzad; Savera Nadeem; Fazila Kaiser; Shahood Alvi; Sami Khan; Mashal Khan; Fatima Effendi; Nida Mumtaz; Saba Hameed; Madiha Imam; Farhan Ali Agha; Maria Wasti; Seemi Pasha; Ayaz Samoo; Usama Khan; Syed Jibran; Shameen Khan; Saife Hassan; Noman Habib; Zainab Shabbir; Ali Abbas; Maryam Fatima; Ayesha Gul; Arisha Razi; Zuhab Khan; Mizna Waqas; Anumta Qureshi; Agha Ali; Ushna Shah; Zainab Qayyum; Haris Waheed; Gul-e-Rana; Alizeh Shah; Noaman Sami
- Theme music composer: Sahir Ali Bagga
- Opening theme: "Na Dikha Tu" by Sahir Ali Bagga
- Country of origin: Pakistan
- Original language: Urdu
- No. of seasons: 3
- No. of episodes: 86

Production
- Producers: Abdullah Kadwani; Asad Qureshi
- Camera setup: Multi-camera setup
- Production company: 7th Sky Entertainment

Original release
- Network: Geo Entertainment
- Release: 25 April 2020 – 2 May 2022

Dikhawa (transl. Show Off) is a Pakistani anthology series that premiered on 25 April 2020, on Geo Entertainment. It was created by Abdullah Kadwani and Asad Qureshi under 7th Sky Entertainment. Being the spin-off to the anthology series Makafaat, it features different short episodic stories focusing on religious and social repercussions of showing off, pretentiousness, and posturing.

== List of episodes ==
| Series | Episodes | Originally released | |
| Series | Episodes | First released | Last released |
|---|---|---|---|
| 1 | 29 | 25 April 2020 | 23 May 2020 |
| 2 | 29 | 14 April 2021 | 12 May 2021 |
| 3 | 24 | 3 April 2022 | 2 May 2022 |

=== Season 1 ===
| No. | Title | Based On | Cast | Date |
|---|---|---|---|---|
| 1 | Beti | Status of daughter in the society | Neelam Muneer, Mehmood Aslam, Saba Faisal, Ali Ansari, Birjees Farooqi, Hashim Butt | 25 April 2020 |
| 2 | Pardah | Seclusion of women from the sight of men or strangers | Omer Shahzad, Hina Altaf, Savera Nadeem, Rehana Kaleem, Salma Qadir | 26 April 2020 |
| 3 | Parwarish | Upbringing of children | Fazila Kaiser, Shahood Alvi, Sami Khan, Irfan Motiwala, Kiran Abbasi | 27 April 2020 |
| 4 | Heera | Unwelcome marriage proposals | Fatima Effendi, Saba Hameed, Birjees Farooqui, Usama Khan, Fazila Kaiser, Hanif Muhammad | 28 April 2020 |
| 5 | Khotay Rishtay | Consequences of fake relations | Madiha Imam, Ali Ansari, Farhan Ali Agha, Humera Bano | 29 April 2020 |
| 6 | Hamdard | Companionship and Poverty | Maria Wasti, Hanif Muhammad, Ayesha Gul, Khushi Maheen, Falak Shehzad | 30 April 2020 |
| 7 | Bahu Rani | Relation of mother-in-law and daughter-in-law | Nausheen Ibrahim, Seemi Pasha, Mirza Zain Baig, Ayaz Samoo, Shazia Qaiser, Shehzad Mukhtar, Salma Qadir | 1 May 2020 |
| 8 | Doosri Bivi | Co-wife | Syed Jibran, Shameen Khan, Namrah Shahid, Syed Arez, Kanwal Khan, Rehana Kaleem | 2 May 2020 |
| 9 | Hirs | Lust | Fatima Effendi, Humaira Bano, Saife Hassan, Sabiha Hashmi, Zohreh Ali | 3 May 2020 |
| 10 | Qurbani | Sacrifice | Hammad Farooqui, Seemi Pasha, Noman Habib, Zohreh Ali, Kanwal Khan, Farah Nadir | 4 May 2020 |
| 11 | Dhaat | Greed | Maria Wasti, Farhan Ali Agha, Fazila Qazi, Salma Qadir | 5 May 2020 |
| 12 | Saraab | Delusion | Syed Jibran, Aleezay Rasul, Shameen Khan, Syed Arez | 6 May 2020 |
| 13 | Numaiesh | Showing Off | Ali Abbas, Zainab Shabbir, Nida Mumtaz, Syed Arez, Fahima Awan | 7 May 2020 |
| 14 | Zid | Obstinance | Saba Hameed, Syed Mohammad Ahmed, Maryam Fatima, Arisha Razi, Zuhab Khan, Aadi Khan, Owais Shaikh | 8 May 2020 |
| 15 | Izzat Dar | Gentleman | Fatima Effendi, Mirza Zain Baig, Nida Mumtaz, Zohreh Ali, Beena Chaudhry | 9 May 2020 |
| 16 | Khushi Ke Rang | Happiness and birth of daughters | Maria Wasti, Kamran Jilani, Mizna Waqas, Parveen Akbar, Omair Leghari | 10 May 2020 |
| 17 | Keraye Ki Izzat | Fake Honor | Hina Altaf, Agha Ali, Sohail Masood | 11 May 2020 |
| 18 | Aakhri Safar | After Life | Ali Abbas, Fatima Effendi, Ali Rizvi, Fareeda Shabbir | 12 May 2020 |
| 19 | Rishton Ki Dour | Friendship | Ushna Shah, Hira Hussain, Annie Zaidi, Farhan Ali Agha, Nida Mumtaz | 13 May 2020 |
| 20 | Eid Ki Khushyan | Festival of Happiness | Nausheen Ibrahim, Saife Hassan, Birjees Farooqui, Nida Mumtaz, Rehma Zaman, Sami Sani, Junaid Akhtar | 14 May 2020 |
| 21 | Dil Ke Armaan | Wishes of Heart | Mohammed Ahmed, Zainab Qayyum, Laiba Khan, Maryam Fatima, Haris Waheed, Gul-e-Rana, Srha Asghar, Akbar Islam | 15 May 2020 |
| 22 | Salami | Gift Money | Anumta Qureshi, Ali Abbas, Seema Khan, Fareeda Shabbir, Kausar Siddiqui, Falak Shehzad | 16 May 2020 |
| 23 | Faraib | Deceiver | Alizeh Shah, Noaman Sami, Asma Abbas, Noshaba Javed, Shehryar Ghazali | 17 May 2020 |
| 24 | Alam Ara | Practice what you Preach | Usama Khan, Adla Khan, Namrah Shahid, Annie Zaidi, Asma Abbas, Shazia Qaiser | 18 May 2020 |
| 25 | Malkin | Maintaining fake Elite status in the society | Javeria Abbasi, Anumta Qureshi, Sehar Khan, Hira Hussain, Seema Khan, Sohail Masood | 19 May 2020 |
| 26 | Libaas | Show Off of Fancy clothes | Maham Amir, Sohail Sameer, Fahima Awan, Junaid Akhtar, Gul e Rana, Ali Ansari, Saba Khan, Falak Shehzad, Ahmed Usman | 20 May 2020 |
| 27 | Rashk | Spendthriftness for luxury items | Mashal Khan, Ali Ansari, Mizna Waqas, Shehryar Ghazali | 21 May 2020 |
| 28 | Safed Posh (Part I) | Strained family relations | Shahood Alvi, Fazila Qazi, Saleem Mairaj, Hira Hussain, Aadi Khan, Seema Khan, Bakhtawar Rashid, Anas Yasin | 22 May 2020 |
| 29 | Safed Posh (Part II) | Strained family relations | Shahood Alvi, Fazila Qazi, Saleem Mairaj, Hira Hussain, Aadi Khan, Seema Khan, Bakhtawar Rashid, Anas Yasin | 23 May 2020 |

=== Season 2 ===
| No. | Title | Cast | Written By | Directed By | Date |
|---|---|---|---|---|---|
| 1 | Mann-o-Salwa | Farhan Ali Agha, Saima Qureshi, Shahood Alvi, Humaira Bano | Amber Azhar | Ali Akbar | 14 April 2021 |
| 2 | Chor Darwazay | Rashid Farooqui, Namrah Shahid, Zainab Qayyum | Nuzhat Saman | Ali Akbar | 15 April 2021 |
| 3 | Maseeha | Furqan Qureshi, Parveen Akbar, Manzoor Qureshi, Khalid Zafar | Amber Azhar | Ali Akbar | 16 April 2021 |
| 4 | Jalan | Maria Wasti, Syed Jibran, Fawad Jalal, Arooba Mirza | Saira Arif | Ali Akbar | 17 April 2021 |
| 5 | Zillat Ka Samaan | Saba Hameed, Khalid Anum, Sidra Niazi, Izzah Malik | Nuzhat Saman | Ali Akbar | 18 April 2021 |
| 6 | Sabz Bagh | Furqan Qureshi, Arooba Mirza, Manzoor Qureshi, Nida Mumtaz, Faisal Bali | Shabnam Sani | Ali Akbar | 19 April 2021 |
| 7 | Khoob Se Khoob Tar | Noaman Sami, Nawal Saeed, Shazia Qaiser | Suraj Baba | Ali Akbar | 20 April 2021 |
| 8 | Nadani | Shahood Alvi, Fazila Qazi, Abdul Rehman, Ali Rizvi | Soofia Khurram | Ali Akbar | 21 April 2021 |
| 9 | Jhoot | Nawal Saeed, Mohsin Abbas Haider, Muhammad Ahmed, Parveen Akbar | Suraj Baba | Ali Akbar | 22 April 2021 |
| 10 | Naqab | Haris Waheed, Adla Khan, Farhan Ali Agha, Ayesha Gul | Tanveer Fatima | Ali Akbar | 23 April 2021 |
| 11 | Pehchaan | Omer Shahzad, Namrah Shahid, Hina Altaf, Samina Ahmed, Annie Zaidi | Fiza Anwar | Aehsun Talish | 24 April 2021 |
| 12 | Rangat | Ali Ansari, Momal Khalid, Akbar Islam, Sumaiya Buksh, Fazila Qazi, Farah Nadir, Khalid Anum, Rashida Tabassum, Shazia Qaiser | Nuzhat Saman | Ali Akbar | 25 April 2021 |
| 13 | Izzat | Sehar Khan, Hassan Niazi, Erum Akhtar, Raeed Alam, Abul Hassan | Saira Arif | Ali Akbar | 26 April 2021 |
| 14 | Meri Biwi | Humayun Ashraf, Adla Khan, Azra Mohiuddin, Faizan Khan | Nuzhat Saman | Ali Akbar | 27 April 2021 |
| 15 | Barhawa | Kamran Jilani, Maria Wasti, Aadi Khan, Rakshanda, Ashiq Khan | Saira Arif | Ali Akbar | 28 April 2021 |
| 16 | Ehsas-e-Kamtari | Mansha Pasha, Syed Jibran, Azra Mohiuddin, Fahima Awan, Nida Khan | Nuzhat Saman | Ali Akbar | 29 April 2021 |
| 17 | Intikhaab | Mohsin Abbas Haider, Mehmood Aslam, Rashid Farooqui, Saqib Sameer, Shahzad Mukhtar | Ambar Azhar | Ali Akbar | 30 April 2021 |
| 18 | Rishtay Naatay | Humayun Ashraf, Srha Asghar, Shazia Naz, Asim Mehmood, Muhammad Ahmed, Sabiha Hashmi, Rashida Tabassum | Aliya Bukhari | Ali Akbar | May 2021 |
| 19 | Ikhlaq | Sumaiya Buksh, Saba Faisal, Hanif Bachan, Aliza Zaidi, Kinza Malik, Rashida Tabassum, Salma Qadir, Hamza Shaikh | Saira Arif | Ali Akbar | 2 May 2021 |
| 20 | Bilal Ki Dadi | Sami Khan (actor), Hira Tareen, Nida Mumtaz, Arsh Naeem | Farhad Qaim Khani | Ali Akbar | 3 May 2021 |
| 21 | Khara Khota | Humayun Ashraf, Momina Iqbal, Adla Khan, Seemi Pasha, Mohsin Abbas Haider, Rahat Ghani | Samra Bukhari | Ali Akbar | 4 May 2021 |
| 22 | Sanad | Shahood Alvi, Sadaf Aashan, Laiba Khan, Munazzah Arif, Aadi Khan | Soofia Khurram | Ali Akbar | 5 May 2021 |
| 23 | Jhansa | Erum Akhtar, Raeed Alam, Nida Mumtaz, Seemi Pasha, Laiba Khan | Amber Azhar | Ali Akbar | 6 May 2021 |
| 24 | Baytay Ki Maa | Saba Faisal, Munazzah Arif, Shahzad Mukhtar, Akbar Islam, Fazal Hussain, Zuhab Khan, Mehmood Jaffery | Nuzhat Saman | Ali Akbar | 7 May 2021 |
| 25 | Chamak Damak | Nazish Jahangir, Hammad Farooqui, Nida Mumtaz, Amber Khan, Shahid Malik | Suraj Baba | Ali Akbar | 8 May 2021 |
| 26 | Moqa Parast | Mehmood Aslam, Annie Zaidi, Kanwal Khan, Shameen Khan | Amber Azhar | Ali Akbar | 9 May 2021 |
| 27 | Mere Bache | Saba Hameed, Asim Mehmood, Aiman Zaman, Srha Asghar, Saqib Sameer, Uzair Abbasi, Saima Shaheen | Saira Arif | Ali Akbar | 10 May 2021 |
| 28 | Naimat | Amna Malik, Zain Afzal, Ayesha Gul | Soofia Khurram | Ali Akbar | 11 May 2021 |
| 29 | Shart | Sami Khan (actor), Sidra Niazi, Rabia Noureen, Saba Faisal, Junaid Akhtar, Salma Asim | Saira Arif | Ali Akbar | 12 May 2021 |

=== Season 3 ===
| No. | Title | Cast | Written By | Directed By | Date |
|---|---|---|---|---|---|
| 1 | Bridal Makeup | Srha Asghar, Arisha Razi, Shaheen Khan, Shehzad Mukhtar | Soofia Khurram | Ali Akbar | 3 April 2022 |
| 2 | Upper Class | Sidra Niazi, Fazila Qazi, Mehmood Aslam, Nida Mumtaz, Shahid Naqvi | Aneela Syed | Ali Akbar | 4 April 2022 |
| 3 | Jhoota | Babar Khan, Sania Shamshad, Shehryar Ghazali, Ikram Abbasi, Hashim Butt, Anees Alam | Athar Ansari | Ali Akbar | 5 April 2022 |
| 4 | Dhong | Adla Khan, Raeed Muhammad Alam, Fazyla Lashari, Nida Mumtaz, Mehmood Aslam, Fazila Qazi | Sidra Sehar Imran | Ali Akbar | 6 April 2022 |
| 5 | Aapa | Kanwal khan, Raeed Muhammad Alam, Erum Akhtar, Humaira Bano, Saife Hassan | Aneela Syed | Ali Akbar | 7 April 2022 |
| 6 | Anokha Ladla | Jinaan Hussain, Faraz Farooqui, Taqi Ahmed, Nida Mumtaz, Saife Hassan, Zainab Raja, Sofia Khan | Amber Azhar | Ali Akbar | 8 April 2022 |
| 7 | Hoor Shumail | Fazyla Lashari, Danial Afzal, Beena Chaudhary, Adla Khan, Tipu Sharif, Parveen Akbar | Nabeela Abar Raja | Ali Akbar | 9 April 2022 |
| 8 | Khasara | Ellie Zaid, Saba Faisal, Hashim Butt, Seemi Pasha, Khalid Anum, Mujtaba Abbas, Ayman | Sidra Sehar Imran | Ali Akbar | 10 April 2022 |
| 9 | Ehsas | Hira Omer, Humayun Ashraf, Saba Faisal, Shabbir Jaan, Fazila Qazi, Qaisar Khan Nizami, Sara Umair | Athar Ansari | Ali Akbar | 11 April 2022 |
| 10 | Pardes | Hammad Farooqui, Nazish Jahangir, Beena Chaudhary, Saba Faisal, Sarah Asim, Izzah Malik | Saira Arif | Ali Akbar | 12 April 2022 |
| 11 | Banawat | Madiha Rizvi, Sohail Sameer, Dania Anwer, Zohaib Khan, Ali Rizvi, Ahmed | Aneela Syed | Ali Akbar | 13 April 2022 |
| 12 | Matlabi | Saniya Samshad, Babar Khan, Beena Chaudhary, Hashim Butt, Mizna Waqas | Nabeela Abar Raja | Ali Akbar | 14 April 2022 |
| 13 | Bara Bol | Anum Fayyaz, Farhan Ali Agha, Fazyla Lashari, Seemi Pasha, Manzoor Qureshi, Taqi Ahmed | Nabeela Abar Raja | Ali Akbar | 15 April 2022 |
| 14 | Sautela | Shazia Naz, Qaisar Khan, Abdul Hadi, Ajwa, Falak | Amber Azhar | Ali Akbar | 17 April 2022 |
| 15 | Muqabil | Haris Waheed, Ellie Zaid, Seemi Pasha, Ayesha Gul, Birjees Farooqui, Shameen Khan | Aamra Shahid | Ali Akbar | 18 April 2022 |
| 16 | Chamak | Kanwal Khan, Arisha Razi, Maria Gul Jan, Hareem Sohail, Fazyla Lashari, Areej Chaudhry | Athar Ansari | Ali Akbar | 19 April 2022 |
| 17 | Baray School Kay Baray Log | Humyaun Ashraf, Hina Javed, Sara Omair, Birjees Farooqi | Soofia Khurram | Ali Akbar | 20 April 2022 |
| 18 | Dekha Dekhi | Shameen, Nida Khan, Yasir Shoro, Ayesha Gul, Ashiq, Sofia | Seema Raza | Ali Akbar | 21 April 2022 |
| 19 | Jhootay Aashiq | Naveed Raza, Fahima Awan, Yasir Shoro, Hina Javed | Soofia Khurram | Ali Akbar | 23 April 2022 |
| 20 | One Million Followers | Yasir Shoro, Shazeal Shoukat, Akbar Islam, Beena Chaudary | Soofia Khurram | Ali Akbar | 25 April 2022 |
| 21 | Makaar | Usman Peerzada, Sabahat Bukhari, Sabiha Hashmi, Maria Rizvi, Sehrish Fatima, Arisha Razi, Shahid Naqvi, Shazia Qaiser | Aneela Syed | Ali Akbar | 26 April 2022 |
| 22 | Heeray Ki Angothi | Raeed Muhammad Alam, Ayesha Rajpoot, Munazza Arif, Birjees Farooqui | Soofia Khurram | Shahid Younas | 28 April 2022 |
| 23 | Doosra Chehra | Michelle Mumtaz, Anum Tanveer, Shaista Jabeen, Ainnie, Imran Rizvi | Nabeela Abar Raja | Shahid Younas | 30 April 2022 |
| 24 | Chalak | Usman Peerzada, Beena Chaudary, Faiza Gillani, Naveed Raza | Nabeela Abar Raja | Ali Akbar | 1 May 2022 |

== Cast ==
- Neelam Muneer as Nimmi
- Azra Mohyeddin as Afaq's mother
- Aruba Mirza as Naina
- Ali Ansari as Hasham
- Nawal Saeed as Saira
- Shazeal Shoukat as Mahi
- Mehmood Aslam as Nimmi's father
- Hina Javed as Ishwar
- Saba Faisal as Nimmi's mother
- Hammad Farooqui as Faisal
- Beena Chaudhary as Saira's neighbor
- Faraz Farooqui as Sajid
- Sadaf Aashan as Sadia
- Hina Altaf as Maira
- Sabiha Hashmi as Sobia
- Arez Ahmed as Zaid
- Amna Malik as Tabinda
- Omer Shahzad as Adeel
- Memoona Qudoos as Areeba
- Saima Qureshi as Ifrah
- Savera Nadeem as Maira's mother
- Sumaiyya Bukhsh as Wareesha
- Fazila Kaiser as Shaista
- Kinza Malik as Salma
- Shahood Alvi as Nadeem
- Sami Khan as Umair Nadeem
- Farah Nadir as Nargis
- Mashal Khan as Huma
- Ayesha Gul as Zakia
- Fatima Effendi as Saba
- Sidra Niazi as Faria
- Nida Mumtaz as Saira's mother
- Fareeda Shabbir as Sabiqa's mother
- Erum Akhtar as Tabassum
- Sehar Khan as Saba
- Usama Khan as Waqar
- Rehma Zaman as Romaisa
- Madiha Rizvi as Samira
- Jinaan Hussain as Pari
- Fahima Awan as Sara
- Adla Khan as Malika
- Saba Hameed as Mrs. Kamran
- Annie Zaidi as Bismah's mother
- Sabahat Ali Bukhari as Ruqayya
- Anum Fayyaz as Nirma
- Munazzah Arif as Shagufta
- Mohsin Abbas Haider as Kamran
- Saniya Shamshad as Asfa Nasir
- Irfan Motiwala as Nadeem's brother
- Raeed Muhammad Alam as Raheel
- Usman Peerzada as Akmal
- Shameen Khan as Aliya
- Madiha Imam as Zara
- Farhan Ali Agha as Basim
- Nazli Nasr as Najma
- Aleezay Rasul as Saniya
- Faiza Gillani as Fouzia
- Maria Wasti
- Seemi Pasha as Fakhra's mother
- Ayaz Samoo
- Syed Jibran as Fahad
- Shameen Khan as Aliya
- Saife Hassan
- Noman Habib
- Ali Abbas
- Maryam Fatima as Maria
- Arisha Razi as Soleha
- Zuhab Khan
- Mizna Waqas as Faiza
- Agha Ali as Momin
- Birjees Farooqui as Rukhsana
- Ushna Shah
- Zainab Qayyum as Maria's mother
- Haris Waheed as Jahangir
- Gul-e-Rana as Gul-e-Rana
- Alizeh Shah as Misbah
- Noaman Sami as Afaq

== Broadcast ==
The first season aired in 2020, airing episodes at noontime on Geo Entertainment.

The second season aired in 2021, airing daily half-hour episodes at 5:00 PM on Geo Entertainment. The season aired daily till the end of Ramadan. The second season also had a re-run shortly after its end on the same channel in July. The first and second season aired on Geo Kahani in December 2021 and January 2022, respectively.

The third season premiered in April 2022, airing episodes daily in the afternoon on Geo Entertainment. The season consisted of 30 episodes in total. However, 6 episodes (Zid, Hirs, Maseeha, Moqa Parast, Eid Ki Khushiyan, and Jhoot) from previous seasons were also aired along with the 24 original episodes. The season ended on 2 May 2022.
