= Mirza Zain Baig =

Pakistani actor (born 1990)

Mirza Zain Baig مرزا زین بیگ
- Born: Mirza Zain Baig; Karachi, Pakistan
- Education: St. Jude’s School
- Occupations: Actor; Model
- Years active: 2016 – present
- Known for: Role of Malik Balaj in Malaal-e-Yaar
- Notable work: Malaal-e-Yaar (2019-2020); Fitrat (2020-2021)

Mirza Zain Baig (Urdu: مرزا زین بیگ) is a Pakistani actor and model.

In 2016, he made his acting debut on television in Dil Lagi as Fazal and rose to fame after portraying Malik Balaj, a cruel, feudal person in Malaal-e-Yaar (2019-2020).

== Early life and education ==
After completing his studies, Baig proceeded to London, where he studied chartered accountancy for three years before returning to Pakistan.

== Career ==
=== Modeling ===
Baig, whenever he went grocery shopping, often got asked to model, but always declined until his mother convinced him to have a go. Baig found that he enjoyed modelling so "decided to continue this profession". He has walked for many lead fashion designers, like Umar Sayeed, and has taken part in many bridal shows and fashion events.

=== Early supporting roles (2016–2019) ===
In 2016 Baig made his TV debut in the drama Dil Lagi after director Nadeem Baig offered him a role. In the same year Baig was seen in Laaj as Shahzeb, and Faraz in Kuch Na Kaho.

In 2017 Baig portrayed the character, Ali, in Hum TV’s drama Mohabbat Khawab Safar, and Javeed in Bedardi Saiyaan on Geo Entertainment. Baig made a guest appearance in Sammi as Pervaiz.

In 2018, Baig was seen in two Pakistani dramas, Aik Mohabbat Kafi Hai, which aired on BOL Network, and Naulakha, which aired on TV One Pakistan.

=== Malaal-e-Yaar and rise to prominence (2019–present) ===
In 2019, Baig was seen in Aas as Safeer, Mera Rab Waris as Faizi, Dil Kiya Karay as Saadi Raza, Meer Abru as Saim, Dil-e-Gumshuda as Nadeem and Malaal-e-Yaar as Malik Balaj.

In 2020, Baig was cast as Arbaaz alongside Saboor Aly, Zubab Rana and Ali Abbas in the drama Fitrat. In the same year he starred in Tera Ghum Aur Hum as Ali alongside Azekah Daniel in their second project together.

In 2021, Baig starred as Azar in Hum TV’s drama Yaar Na Bichray alongside Zainab Shabbir in their second project together. He also played Taimoor Shah in Pakistan’s most watched drama, Khuda Aur Muhabbat, and Murtaza in Bisaat starring Ayesha Omar and Azfar Rehman.

In 2022, Baig played Hamza in the anthology series Sirat-e-Mustaqeem opposite Hina Altaf, which was a Ramadan special broadcast on ARY Digital. He then portrayed the character of Aziz in the drama Pehchaan alongside Hiba Bukhari and Syed Jibran on Hum TV. Baig also starred, as Azhar Baig, in the short YouTube film, Truth or Dare, on SeePrime. He was seen playing character Zayan in ARY Digital’s drama, Hook.

In 2023, Baig was seen on screen playing Sarmad and Shozaib in ARY Digital’s drama Samjhota and Sar-e-Rah respectively, and in Fareb as Sultan on Hum TV alongside Zainab Shabbir in their third project together.

In 2024, he had a lead role in Fahim Burney's Dil Ka Kya Karein.

== Personal life ==
Baig, in an interview, revealed that he is "happily married".

== Filmography ==
=== Television serials ===
Year	Title	Role	Network	Notes	Refs
2016	Dil Lagi	Fazal	ARY Digital	TV debut	
2016	Laaj	Shahzeb	Hum TV	Supporting role	
2016	Kuch Na Kaho	Faraz	Hum TV	Supporting role	
2017	Mohabbat Khawab Safar	Ali	Hum TV	Leading role	
2017	Sammi	Pervaiz	Hum TV	Guest appearance	
2017	Bedardi Saiyaan	Javeed	Geo TV	Recurring	
2018	Aik Mohabbat Kafi Hai	Hashir	BOL Network	Supporting role	
2018	Naulakha	Zain	TV ONE	Leading role	
2019	Aas	Safeer	TV ONE	Leading role	
2019	Mera Rab Waris	Faizi	Geo TV	Supporting role	
2019	Dil Kiya Karay	Saadi Raza	Geo TV	Supporting role	
2019	Meer Abru	Saim	Hum TV	Supporting role	
2019	Dil-e-Gumshuda	Nadeem	Geo TV	Recurring	
2019	Malaal-e-Yaar	Malik Balaj	Hum TV	Leading role	
2020	Fitrat	Arbaaz	Geo TV	Leading role	
2020	Tera Ghum Aur Hum	Ali	Hum TV	Leading role	
2021	Yaar Na Bichray	Azar	Hum TV	Leading role	
2021	Khuda Aur Muhabbat (season 3)	Taimoor Shah	Geo TV	Recurring	
2021	Bisaat	Murtaza	Hum TV		
2022	Sirat-e-Mustaqeem	Hamza	ARY Digital	Anthology series (Episode 5 : "Nashukri")	
2022	Pehchaan	Aziz	Hum TV	Supporting role	
2022	Hook	Zayan	ARY Digital		
2023	Samjhota	Sarmad	ARY Digital	Leading role	
2023	Mann Aangan	Faraz	ARY Digital	Leading role	
2023	Sar-e-Rah	Shozaib	ARY Digital	Supporting role	
2023	Fareb	Sultan	Hum TV	Leading role	
2023	Honey Moon	Moon	Green Entertainment	Leading role	
2024	Ghaata	Danish	Geo TV	Leading role	
2024	Dua Aur Azan	Azan	Green Entertainment	Leading role	
2024	Dil Ka Kya Karein	Nayal	Green Entertainment	Leading role	
2024	Mohabbat Reza Reza	Essa	Hum TV	Leading role	
2024	Mehshar	Noman Gillani	Geo TV	Supporting role	
2025	Haya	Rohan	Geo TV	Leading role	
2026	Aye Dil Aazma Nahin	Asfandyar	Hum TV	Leading role	
2026	Marg E Wafa	Hassan	Hum TV	Leading role	

=== Films ===
Year	Title	Role	Notes	Refs
2022	Truth or Dare	Azhar Baig	Short film	

=== Other appearances ===
Year	Title	Role	Network	Notes	Refs
2021	ARY Celebrity League	Himself	ARY Digital	Celebrity cricket match	
