= Madventures (Pakistani game show) =

- Genre: Interactive reality game show
- Directed by: Asif Khan; Khurram Farid
- Presented by: Ahsan Khan; Ahmad Ali Butt; Mohib Mirza
- Starring: Priyamvada Kant; Mehwish Hayat; Natasha Ali; Priyal Gor; Leena Jumani; Shafaq Naaz; Saima Azhar; Khurram Patras; Kanwar Arsalan; Fatima Effendi; Sukaina Khan; Sana Nawaz; Sana Askari; Nouman Javaid; Rahma Ali
- Country of origin: Pakistan
- Original language: Urdu
- No. of seasons: 3

Production
- Production location: Thailand
- Camera setup: Multi-camera
- Running time: approx. 52 minutes

Original release
- Network: ARY Digital
- Release: 22 February 2013 – present

Madventures is a Pakistani adaptation of the popular reality show Fear Factor. The first season of the series premiered on 22 February 2013 on ARY Digital. It was presented by Pakistani television actor Ahsan Khan, and won by Priyamvada Kant from India. The second season began airing on 1 August 2015 which was hosted by Pakistani comedian and actor Ahmad Ali Butt.

== Concept ==
Madventures originated as a 13-part series that aired on SET Asia in 2013. Season 1 was shot in Thailand. Six Pakistani and six Indian celebrities participated.

In the second season, all celebrities were Pakistani.

== Host ==
Season 1 was hosted by Ahsan Khan, season 2 by Ahmed Ali Butt, and season 3 by Mohib Mirza.

== Series overview ==
=== Season 1 ===
==== Contestants ====
Six Pakistani and six Indian celebrities participated in the show.

===== Winners (Pakistan) =====
- Mehwish Hayat & Sana Nawaz

Winner (India)

- Priyamvada Kant

===== Pakistani contestants =====
- Mehwish Hayat
- Sana Nawaz
- Sana Askari
- Ayesha Toor
- Zeba Ali
- Madiha Iftikhar

===== Indian contestants =====
- Priyamvada Kant
- Leena Jumani
- Priyal Gor
- Shafaq Naaz
- Melanie Pais
- Hritu Dudani

=== Season 2 ===
Only Pakistani celebrities (paired in teams of 1 male and 1 female) participated in the show.

==== Contestants ====
- Danish Hayat & Mehwish Hayat (Winner)
- Taifoor Khan & Saima Azhar (1st Runner-up)
- Daniyal Raheel & Farah Ali (2nd Runner-up)
- Saim Ali & Natasha Ali
- Fakhar Imam & Sana Nawaz
- Khurram Patras & Hina Altaf (Eliminated on 6th place)
- Minhaj Ali Askari & Sana Askari (Eliminated on 7th place)
- Kanwar Arsalan & Fatima Effendi (Eliminated on 8th place)
- Faiq Khan & Rahma Ali (Eliminated on 9th place)
- Nouman Javaid & Rabab Hashim (Eliminated on 10th Place)

=== Season 3 ===
Season 3 was hosted by Mohib Mirza. It started airing from 2 March 2018 on ARY Zindagi. As with season 2, only Pakistani celebrated participated in the show.

==== Contestants ====
- Fahad Shaikh and Mahi Baloch (Winners)
- Raeed Muhammad Alam and Shazia Naz (1st Runner-up)
- Ayaz Samoo and Anoushay Abbasi (2nd Runner-up)
- Noman Habib and Sukaina Khan (Eliminated on 4th place)
- Yasir Shoro and Iqra (Eliminated on 5th place)
- Mani and Anum Aqeel (Eliminated on 6th place)
- Taqi Ahmed and Anam Tanveer (Eliminated on 7th place)
- Aadi Khan and Eshita Syed (Eliminated on 8th place)
- Sohail and Dua Malik (Eliminated on 9th place)
- Faizan Shaikh and Maham Amir (Eliminated on 10th place)
