= Taqdeer (2022 TV series) =

Pakistani television series

- Title screen
- Genre: Family
- Written by: Hania Javed
- Directed by: Mohsin Talat
- Starring: Sami Khan; Alizeh Shah
- Theme music composer: SK Salman Khan (Sk Studio)
- Composer: SK Salman Khan (Sk Studio)
- Country of origin: Pakistan
- Original language: Urdu
- No. of episodes: 56

Production
- Producers: Doorway Entertainment; Fahad Mustafa; Dr. Ali Kazmi
- Camera setup: Multi-camera setup

Original release
- Network: ARY Digital
- Release: 10 October 2022 – 12 January 2023

Taqdeer (Urdu: تقدیر) is a Pakistani drama series that premiered on ARY Digital on 10 October in 2022. Directed by Mohsin Talat and written by Hania Javed, it is a production of Doorway Entertainment and Big Bang Entertainment. It stars Sami Khan and Alizeh Shah in lead roles.

== Synopsis ==
The story is about Romaisa (Alizeh), the only daughter of the family, who is loved dearly by both of her elder brothers. Later she meets Asad (Sami), a businessman who begins to like her. They get married, which is when she begins to face problems despite trying her best to keep everyone happy.

== Cast ==
- Sami Khan as Asad
- Alizeh Shah as Romaisa
- Asim Mehmood as Arsal
- Adil Hussain as Haris
- Annie Zaidi as Khadija
- Javed Sheikh as Tahir
- Amna Malik as Hamna
- Saba Faisal as Fehmida
- Khaled Anam as Zubair
- Zain Afzal as Nabeel
- Maryam Noor as Zoni
- Aliya Ali as Maheen
- Izzah Malik as Zahira
- Hina Rizvi as Saleha
- Anosha Ali as Ramsha
- Nida Khan as Shazia
- Rizwan Ali Jaffri as Saad
