= Natasha Ali =

Pakistani actress

- Born: 1 January 1988 (age 38); Lahore, Punjab, Pakistan
- Education: University of Lahore
- Occupations: Actress, Model, Host
- Years active: 2001–present

Natasha Ali is a Pakistani actress, model and host. She is known for her roles in Talafi, Khaas, Mushk, Malaal-e-Yaar, Baraat Series and Tamasha Season 2.

== Career ==
She made her debut in 2001 on PTV. She played a small supporting actress in drama Miss Fit on PTV. Then she did lead roles for several dramas on PTV Channel which made her noted by the audience. She played an important lead role in Talafi drama as Sharmeen on PTV which was a great success, she was praised for playing a villainess role and got popular. She was also a host on many morning shows such as Channel 92. In 2013 she was very well known by the audience and appeared in several dramas, she was praised for her acting and was recognized for her acting skills and for playing different characters. In 2019-2020, she played some different roles in some dramas such as Khaas, Mushk, Malaal-e-Yaar and Resham Gali Ki Husna.

== Personal life ==
Natasha Ali’s career spans around 18 years in industry

== Filmography ==
=== Television ===
Year	Title	Role	Network
2001	Miss Fit	Subah	PTV
2006	Kabhi Kabhi Pyar Main	Seleema	PTV
2007	Bicharnay Se Pehle	Saba	ATV
2008	Woh Subah Kab Ayegi	Husna	ATV
2009	Bulbulay	Rani	ARY Digital
2009	Identity	Shamim	ARY Digital
2009	Nestlé Nesvita Women of Strength '09	Herself	Geo TV, ARY TV, TVOne Global
2009	Kis Ki Aayegi Baraat	Dolly	Geo Entertainment
2009	Azar Ki Ayegi Baraat	Dolly	Geo TV
2010	Natak Mandi	Mashal	PTV
2010	Jaday Ka Chand	Fareeda	PTV
2010	Shikan	Maryam	PTV
2010	Rani Beti Raaj Kare	Lubna	ARY Digital
2010	Dolly Ki Ayegi Baraat	Dolly	Geo Entertainment
2011	Anokhi	Sarah	A Plus
2011	Takkay Ki Ayegi Baraat	Dolly	Geo Entertainment
2011	Lamha Lamha Zindagi	Farzana	ARY Digital
2011	Ishq Ibadat	Natalia	Geo TV
2012	Mil Ke Bhi Hum Na Mile	Zareena	Geo TV
2012	Talafi	Sharmeen	PTV
2012	Dil Sey Dil Tak	Gia	PTV
2012	Man Jali	Ambereen	Geo TV
2012	Dil tu bhatke ga	Isha	Geo TV
2012	Annie Ki Ayegi Baraat	Dolly	Geo Entertainment
2013	Qarz	Noor	ARY Digital
2013	Madventures	Herself	ARY Digital
2014	Haq Meher	Sajida	ARY Digital
2014	Rangbaaz	Saima	Express Entertainment
2014	Qudrat	Yasmee	ARY Digital
2014	Tum Kia Milay	Jamila	ACB
2014	Meka Aur Susral	Sobia	ARY Digital
2015	Maata	Maria	ARY Digital
2015	Love in Gulshan e Bahar	Munni	TV One
2015	Mohabbat Karna Mana Hai	Sidra	Bol Entertainment
2016	Maikey Se Sasural	Afifa	ARY Digital
2016	Tere Pyar Main	Marwa	ATV
2016	Joru Ka Ghulam	Sharmeen	Geo TV
2017	Mazaaq Raat	Herself	Dunya News
2017	Malkin	Bisma	Geo Entertainment
2017	Hari Hari Churiyaan	Zunaira	Geo Entertainment
2018	Mazung De Meena Sheena	Durdana	TV One
2019	Khaas	Farah	Hum TV
2019	Resham Gali Ki Husna	Sherbano	Hum TV
2019	Malaal-e-Yaar	Saeeda	Hum TV
2020	Mushk	Muqaddar Khan's wife	Hum TV
2021	Mrs.Chaudhary Ka Tarka	Dolly	Geo TV
2022	Bikhray Hain Hum	Shanzay	Hum TV
2022	Hook	Safia	ARY Digital
2023	Dagh-e-Dil	Resham	Hum TV
2023	Tamasha Season 2	Contestant	ARY Digital
2025	Kuch Na Kehna	Arifa	Green Entertainment
2025	Muqaam	Sidra	Aan TV

=== Film ===
Year	Title	Role
2016	Ehsas	Sana
2018	Chandni	Ulfat
