= Teri Rah Mein =

Pakistani television series

- Genre: Family
- Written by: Nadia Ahmed
- Directed by: Khurram Walter
- Starring: Zainab Shabbir; Shahroz Sabzwari; Shazeal Shoukat; Usama Khan
- Country of origin: Pakistan
- Original language: Urdu
- No. of episodes: 63

Production
- Producer: iDream Entertainment
- Camera setup: Multi-camera setup

Original release
- Network: ARY Digital
- Release: 3 January – 6 March 2022

Teri Rah Mein (Urdu: تیری راہ میں) is a Pakistani drama series that premiered on ARY Digital on 3 January 2022. Directed by Khurram Walter and written by Nadia Ahmed, it is a production of iDream Entertainment. Zainab Shabbir, Shazeal Shoukat, Usama Khan and Shahroz Sabzwari star in lead roles.

== Synopsis ==
Teri Rah Mein is the story of two university friends, Emaan and Maha belonging to different backgrounds who later become arch-rivals.

== Cast ==
- Zainab Shabbir as Emaan
- Shahroz Sabzwari as Ahmar
- Shazeal Shoukat as Maha
- Usama Khan as Fakhar
- Sana Fakhar as Samia
- Saiqa as Emaan's mother
- Daniyal Khan as Daniyal
- Sangeeta as Bakhtiar's mother
- Sohail Sameer as Faisal
- Nida Hussain as Faria
- Afshan Qureshi as Samia and Faria's mother
- Naima Khan as Najma
- Tabbasum Arif as Samina
- Behroze Sabzwari as Bakhtiar
- Abdullah Khan as Umair
- Tehseen Tasneem
