= Talafi =

Pakistani television series

- Genre: Drama
- Written by: Seema Munaf
- Directed by: Anjum Shahzad
- Creative director: Raamis Tanveer Ahmed
- Starring: Meekal Zulfiqar; Mahnoor Baloch; Natasha Ali; Rubina Ashraf; Rabia Noreen; Salma Hassan; Adnan Saeed; Mustafa Kazmi
- Theme music composer: Shaibi
- Country of origin: Pakistan
- Original language: Urdu
- No. of episodes: 20

Production
- Producers: Humayun Saeed; Shehzad Nasib
- Production location: Karachi
- Running time: 50 minutes
- Production company: Six Sigma entertainment

Original release
- Network: PTV
- Release: 23 June 2012 – 2012

Talafi (Urdu: تلافی, lit. 'Compensation') is a Pakistani drama serial produced by Humayun Saeed and Shehzad Nasib and aired on PTV Home in 2012.

== Cast ==
- Mahnoor Baloch as Falak
- Mikaal Zulfiqar as Ammad
- Natasha Ali as Sharmeen
- Rubina Ashraf as Surayya
- Rabia Noreen as Falak's mother
- Salma Hassan as Nomeer's wife
- Adnan Saeed as Nomeer

== Reception ==
Talafi became the top rated drama on PTV Network easily due to brisk pace of the plot and performance of the cast. Gaining respectable viewership across Pakistan despite facing stiff competition from satellite networks.

== Accolades ==
=== Lux Style Awards ===
- Best TV Play (Terrestrial)-Nominated
- Best TV Actress (Terrestrial)-Mahnoor Baloch-Won
- Best TV Writer-Seema Munaf-Nominated
