= Sanwari =

Pakistani TV series

- Original title: سانوری
- Genre: Romantic drama Soap opera Teen drama
- Written by: Abida Ahmed
- Directed by: Kamran Akbar Khan
- Starring: Zainab Shabbir; Usama Khan; Sehar Khan; Zain Afzal
- Theme music composer: Khadeeja Haider
- Opening theme: Kya Hai Iss Rang Mein Rang Mein by Khadeeja Haider & Ali Arsalaan
- Composer: Khadeeja Haider
- Country of origin: Pakistan
- Original language: Urdu
- No. of seasons: 1
- No. of episodes: 180

Production
- Producer: Momina Duraid
- Cinematography: Abrar Kashmiri
- Editor: Faizan Ghori
- Running time: 15-17 minutes

Original release
- Network: Hum TV
- Release: 20 August 2018 – 3 May 2019

Related
- Maa Sadqay

Sanwari (Urdu: سانوری, lit. 'Dusky') is a Pakistani soap opera aired on Hum TV from 20 August 2018 to 3 May 2019. It was produced by Momina Duraid under her production banner MD Productions. The show stars Zainab Shabir as Ujala, a dark-skinned girl who has to face the harshness of society, as well as trials and tribulations throughout her journey to happiness. Sanwari was the longest-running daily soap opera to be aired on Hum TV with 180 episodes.

== Plot ==
Ujala is a young girl who lives in a small town but goes to a big college. She is studious and always looking out for her family. Shama, her sister, on the other hand, is selfish and obnoxious. Her brother, Jalal, is a thug on the streets with a bad reputation who robs people to get money and gives it to their mother, Mrs. Sultan. The father, Munawar Sultan, is a strict with his children but loves them, especially Ujala, as she is the most well-mannered of all. Shama is about to marry a rich businessman, but as soon as his family realizes that Jalal is a robber, they withdraw on marriage day. Instead, she marries Taimoor, who has loved her since childhood and makes his life horrible as well as her mother-in-law's. Ujala gets hit by businessman Tabrez's car, and Tabrez instantly falls in love; he begins to call and talk to Ujala. On the other hand, Shama has come back to her house and claims that Taimoor is no good and he has beat her. However, Taimoor exposes her partially, and Shama's father forces her to go back to Taimoor's house. Shama has an extramarital affair with another man who ends up scamming her, and Shama still does not learn her lesson. Ujala is insistent on not liking Tabrez at first; she soon falls in love with him. Tabrez's mother is totally against the relationship until she finds out Ujala is her brother's daughter and is aware now that Tabrez and Ujala are cousins and that Ujala is a very good person. She wants to get Ujala and Tabrez married. Days before their marriage, Ujala is kidnapped by Goga Badmaash and Reem, who were obsessed with Tabrez and were once going to marry Tabrez. Ujala's mother dies out of shock at Ujala being kidnapped and Shama being evil;she blames Ujala. Ujala is heartbroken and rejects Tabrez's proposal because she feels that she should just be with her father for the rest of her life and take care of him, not marry and leave the house. Tabrez feels that he is at fault and hates himself. Tabrez's mother now has abandoned hope of Ujala and Tabrez getting married and is against Ujala. However, after repeated trials, Tabrez is finally successful in getting Ujala to tell him what's wrong, and she tells Tabrez. Tabrez is shocked and comforts Ujala about the situation. However, in a twist of events, Ujala ends up getting engaged to someone else because they believe Ujala is no longer held in the shackles of Tabrez's love. Ujala breaks engagement and tells them she will not do this. She tells Tabrez she is ready for marriage. Tabrez is happy, and so is Tabrez's mother, as well as Ujala's father. Shama goes shopping with Ujala and Tabrez, and Reem's ex-fiancé, whom Ujala had teamed up with before, tells lies to Tabrez about how they spent nights at his house, and Tabrez does not believe him. Ujala and Tabrez get married, and Ujala's father dies days later, shattering Ujala further; she is further shattered when her brother Jalal dies. Ujala and Tabrez are living a happy married life now, and Shama enters their life once again with evil intentions;she accuses Taimoor and his mother of ousting her out of the house, and Tabrez's mother believes her and lets her live in the house. Taimoor and his mother come back, begging for Shama to come back, but Shama says until Taimoor gives Reem a divorce, she will not come back. Shama returns to Taimoor's house eventually, and she messages Reem, "talaaq, talaaq, talaaq" (divorce, divorce, divorce). Reem is shocked and saddened, and she leaves the house, and Taimoor finds her and says that he never gave her a divorce, and that was Shama, who has stolen his phone, and he has just now realized it. He buys a house for Reem to stay in and does not tell anybody, but Shama begins noticing large transactions that she does not know about, and it is actually Taimoor withdrawing the rent for Reem's house. Tabrez's mother begins to peeve Tabrez about having a grandchild, and Tabrez tells his mother that Ujala can not have children; he learned this when the accident happened and Ujala was shot. Tabrez's mother, is shocked but promises Tabrez that she will not tell Ujala. Tabrez's mother is talking to Taimoor's mother and Shama overhears them and asks her mother-in-law what they were talking about and she tells Shama about, Ujala not being able to be a mother and tells Shama not to tell anyone, but Shama tells Ujala. Ujala is shattered and is mad at Tabrez for why he did not tell her and why he hid this from her. Tabrez says he wanted to save her from being shattered, and Tabrez's mom tells Tabrez he should do another marriage so that his legacy can live on, but Tabrez is angered by such an idea as he loves Ujala. However, to the contrary of Tabrez's thinking, Ujala gets convinced by Tabrez's mom to convince Tabrez to do another marriage, to which Tabrez is still saying no, as he loves Ujala and only Ujala. Tabrez's mom tells Tabrez to marry a poor girl, have a baby with her, and then divorce her. Tabrez gets mad because that is all Ujala and his mom are talking to him about. Shama is mad about Taimoor still sending Reem money, giving her a place to live, and giving her attention. Ujala and Shama visit Reem, and Shama talks to Reem, saying that she will get Taimoor, but Shama pushes her on a table, hurting Reem and killing Reem's baby. Taimoor is angered and disgusted by Shama's actions and tells her that she only has time until Shama's gives birth and claims then he will do something. Ujala is being shown pictures of other girls that Tabrez, could marry by Tabrez's mom and is saddened by the fact that Tabrez's mother, would do this. She tells Tabrez and Tabrez goes to confront her. Tabrez confronts his mother, and she gets very angry and leaves the house. Ujala is worried and tells Tabrez to agree to his mother's terms, but Tabrez refuses. Tabrez's mom, however, returns with his second cousin and is now forcing Tabrez to marry her. Ujala convinces Tabrez to marry Zoobi, and Tabrez marries Zoobi. Ujala still is insecure though and feels overshadowed by Zoobi. Ujala becomes distant from Tabrez. Shama gives birth, and she finally brings Taimoor closer to her, but Reem is jealous of this. Tabrez's mother dies after realizing how badly she did with Ujala, and Tabrez is shattered, and Zoobi takes advantage of this. Zoobi and her mother continuously plot against Ujala so Tabrez can just be with her. Ujala is seen as mentally unstable by Tabrez and Zoobi because Zoobi has fully brainwashed Tabrez into thinking that Ujala is mentally unstable and needs help. Ujala leaves Tabrez and goes to Shama's house and lives with her for a while, but then later she goes back because Tabrez claims he will treat her right. Reem leaves Taimoor to be with her husband, and Taimoor understands, and Taimoor and Shama are living happily. Ujala and Zoobi are simply at loggerheads. Ujala meets another man who is Sidrah's brother who tries to profess his love to Ujala even after he realizes that she married, but Ujala tells him to back off. Ujala gets pregnant and loses her child and Zoobi kicks her out the house. Ujala stays with Shama and slowly Taimoor begins to realize his mistake. He divorces Zoobi and Zoobi and her mother leave, and Zoobi goes back to her fiancé, Pappu. Ujala goes back to Tabrez after Tabrez begs for her back, and Shama and her mother-in-law, and Taimoor convince her that Tabrez has changed. Ujala is pregnant again and Tabrez is joyous, and they finally bury the hatchet of all the troubles they have had. Ujala and Tabrez have a baby. Taimoor and Shama move to Dubai and visit Pakistan occasionally, as Taimoor has a big business in Dubai. Zoobi returns because she lies that Pappu divorced her when he actually did not. She tries again to create a commotion in Ujala and Tabrez's lives, but realizes that she has done wrong. Tabrez puts the house he lives in under Zoobi's name, as he said she is the mother of his child and that Zoobi has learned her lesson, and that Zoobi was influenced by the greed of money by Zoobi's own family and the greed of Tabrez's mother for a grandchild. Ujala and Tabrez move to a new house, and Ujala tells Tabrez she loves him, and the show ends.

== Cast ==
- Zainab Shabbir as Ujala
- Zain Afzal as Taimoor
- Usama Khan as Tabrez Farasat Ali
- Sehar Khan as Shama
- Mahnoor Khan as Reem
- Afraz Rasool as Asad
- Azra Mohyeddin as Farri (dead)
- Khalifa Sajeer Uddin as Ujala's father (dead)
- Amber Khan as Reem's mother (dead)
- Kinza Malik as Ujala's mother (dead)
- Hamza Sheikh as Jalal (dead)
- Rashida Tabbassum as Taimoor's mother

== Reception ==
Sanwari is one of HUM's most-viewed and most successful daily soap operas. The show has received a good response from the viewers; being the top daily soap airing in Pakistan across all channels. On YouTube, the first episode has nearly 1 million views and the other episodes have 300–700K views. It has gotten TRPs as high as 5.6–6.4 regularly. Its regular TRP is usually above 5 and is very popular; it has completed more than 100 episodes since its inception. Its highest rating has been 10.2 and has been the slot leader at 7:30 pm in Pakistan beating all other networks. The last episode had 10.8 TRP. Overall, the show received good trp since its inception.

== Soundtrack ==
Sanwari- OST

Soundtrack album by Khadeeja Haider
- Released: 27 August 2018
- Recorded: 2018
- Genre: Television soundtrack
- Length: (1:21)
- Language: Urdu
- Label: Hum TV

Music video
- "Sanwari" OST on YouTube

The title song was sung by Khadeeja Haider. The music was composed and the lyrics were written by Khadeeja Haider.

== Awards and nominations ==
Year	Award	Category	Recipient(s)	Result	Ref.
2019	Hum Awards	Hum Award for Best Soap Actor	Usama Khan	Won	
