= Malkin (TV series) =

Pakistani television series

- Title screen
- Genre: Family drama Social
- Written by: Sarwat Nazir
- Directed by: Syed Wajahat Hussain
- Starring: Maria Wasti; Aly Khan; Samina Ahmed
- Theme music composer: Sanam Marvi; Asim Azhar
- Composer: Qasim Azhar
- Country of origin: Pakistan
- Original language: Urdu
- No. of episodes: 27

Production
- Producer: Aijaz Aslam
- Production locations: Lahore, Pakistan
- Running time: approx 40 minutes
- Production company: Ice Media And Entertainment

Original release
- Network: Geo Entertainment
- Release: 25 September 2017 – 18 February 2018

Malkin is a Pakistani drama television series written by Sarwat Nazir and directed by Wajahat Hussain. It stars Maria Wasti, Aly Khan and Samina Ahmed in lead roles. The drama debuted on 25 September 2017 on Geo Entertainment, and the last of its 27 episodes aired on 18 February 2018. The drama encapsulates themes of selfishness, greed and insensitivity towards others. The idea that a woman is capable of destroying a perfect happy family owing to her own personal interest and selfish desires.

== Cast ==
- Maria Wasti as Gulnaz
- Samina Ahmed as Nafisa
- Alyy Khan as Yawer
- Natasha Ali as Bisma
- Taifoor Khan as Khizer
- Azra Mansoor as Nagina
- Adnan Shah Tipu as Munne Mamu
- Umer Naru as Saif
- Minal Khan as Seemi
- Arisha Razi as Neha
- Mubassira Aapa as Surayya
- Azekah Daniel as Samia
- Faraz Farooqui as Shahid
- Aliya Malik as Najma Maid
- Fouzia Sheikh as Perveen
- Anees Alam as Munshi
- Ali Ramzan as Ajmal
- Ibaad Hussain as Tanveer
- Shahrukh as Hassan
- Maryam Khalid as Semi Child
- Shifa Akbar as Neha Child
- M.Moosa as Saif Child
- Iman Sheikh as Samia Child
- Ahsan Khan as Shahid Child
