= Kabhi Band Kabhi Baja =

- Genre: Sitcom
- Written by: Syed Zain Raza
- Directed by: Angeline Malik
- Presented by: Angeline Malik
- Country of origin: Pakistan
- Original language: Urdu
- No. of seasons: 1
- No. of episodes: 26

Production
- Producer: Angeline Malik
- Production locations: Karachi, Sindh, Pakistan
- Camera setup: Multi-Camera setup
- Running time: 35-40 minutes
- Production company: Angelic Films

Original release
- Network: Express Entertainment
- Release: 22 June – 29 December 2018

Kabhi Band Kabhi Baja is a 2018 Pakistani anthology sitcom series that aired on Express Entertainment from 22 June 2018. It is produced and directed by Angeline Malik of Kitni Girhain Baaki Hain fame.

== Cast ==
- Minal Khan (Episode 1)
- Ahmed Hassan (Episode 1)
- Faryal Mehmood
- Omer Shahzad
- Irfan Khoosat
- Noor Khan
- Laila Wasti as Iffat
- Hammad Farooqui as Zaid Ahmed
- Ahmed Hassan
- Raeed Muhammad Alam as Sameer
- Samina Ahmad
- Ghana Ali
- Farhan Ahmed Malhi as Ali
- Ali Ansari
- Faris Shafi
- Sana Arsal
- Fazaila Lashari
- Uzma Hassan as Madiha
- Uroosa Siddiqui
- Nawal Saeed as Mahnoor
- Asim Mehmood
- Sara Razi
- Humayun Ashraf
- Alyy Khan
- Farah Nadir as Mahnoor's mother
- Arjumand Rahim
- Mariyam Nafees
- Furqan Qureshi
- Parveen Akbar
- Benita David
- Danish Nawaz
- Shabbir Jan
- Ali Abbas
- Mehmood Aslam
- Fariya Sheikh
- Yashma Gill
- Jahanzeb Khan
- Anmol Baloch as Laila
- Faraz Farooqui as Arif
- Ayaz Samoo
- Manzoor Qureshi
- Imran Ashraf
- Gul-e-Rana
- Angeline Malik
- Aijaz Aslam
- Sami Khan
- Saman Ansari
- Zaheen Tahira as Safia

== Episodes ==
No.	Title	Directed by	Written by	Original release date
1	"Ulfat Bhai"	Angeline Malik	Suraj Baba	26 June 2018
Cast: Minal Khan, Ahmed Hassan
2	"Papa Maan Jayenge"	Angeline Malik	Syed Zain Raza	29 June 2018
Cast: Faryal Mehmood, Omer Shahzad, Irfan Khoosat
3	"Aakhri Raat"	Angeline Malik	Syed Zain Raza	6 July 2018
Cast: Noor Khan, Hammad Farooqui
4	"Diana Cottage"	Angeline Malik	Syed Zain Raza	13 July 2018
Cast: Uzma Hassan, Ahmed Hassan, Samina Ahmad
5	"Haye Bechare Mohabbat Ke Maare"	Angeline Malik	Suraj Baba	20 July 2018
Cast: Ghana Ali, Ali Ansari
6	"Niralay Bannay Aur Amma"	Angeline Malik	Khurram Abbas	27 July 2018
Cast: Faris Shafi, Sana Arsal, Fazaila Lashari,
7	"Tujh Par Qurban Meri Jaan"	Angeline Malik	Suraj Baba	3 August 2018
Cast: Uroosa Siddiqui, Asim Mehmood
8	"Jio Mere Laal"	Angeline Malik	Syed Zain Raza	10 August 2018
Cast: Sara Razi, Humayun Ashraf
9	"Meri Bholi Begum"	Angeline Malik	Syed Zain Raza	17 August 2018
Cast: Alyy Khan, Arjumand Rahim
10	"Ammi Nahi Manengi"	Angeline Malik	Hassan Imran	24 August 2018
Cast: Mariyam Nafees, Furqan Qureshi, Samina Ahmad, Parveen Akbar
11	"Mohabbat Ka Maara"	Angeline Malik	Suraj Baba	31 August 2018
Cast: Benita David, Danish Nawaz
12	"Tu Tu Main Main"	Angeline Malik	Khurram Abbas	7 September 2018
Cast: Ali Abbas, Mehmood Aslam, Fariya Sheikh
13	"Bunti Aur Bublu"	Angeline Malik	Suraj Baba	14 September 2018
Cast: Yashma Gill, Jahanzeb Khan, Fouzia Mushtaq
14	"Chal Dil Mere"	Angeline Malik	Khurram Abbas	28 September 2018
Cast: Ayaz Samoo, Madiha Zaidi, Manzoor Qureshi, Ali Deswali
15	"Jhooti Mohabbat"	Angeline Malik	Suraj Baba	5 October 2018
Cast: Ahmed Hassan, Nausheen Ahmed, Samra Khan
16	"Laila Ka Jaadu"	Angeline Malik	Suraj Baba	13 October 2018
Cast: Anmol Baloch, Faraz Farooqui
17	"Naiki Kar Doob Marr"	Angeline Malik	Suraj Baba	20 October 2018
Cast: Imran Ashraf, Nawal Saeed, Gul-e-Rana
18	"Mama Mian"	Angeline Malik	Suraj Baba	27 October 2018
Cast: Benita David, Syed Rizwan Ali
19	"Sanjhe Saiyaan"	Angeline Malik	Khurram Abbas	3 November 2018
Cast: Sadia Ghafar, Faris Shafi, Fariya Sheikh
20	"Dil Hai Chota Sa"	Angeline Malik	Suraj Baba	10 November 2018
Cast: Angeline Malik, Aijaz Aslam, Sami Khan
21	"Ghar Damaad"	Angeline Malik	Tayyab Nazir	17 November 2018
Cast: Noor Khan, Saman Ansari, Zaheen Tahira
22	"Watta satta"	Angeline Malik	Khurram Abbas	1 December 2018
Cast: Mariyam Nafees, Nawal Saeed
23	"Pal Mein Mohabbat Pal Mein Nafrat"	Angeline Malik	Atiq Inayat	8 December 2018
Cast: Ayaz Samoo, Komal Aziz, Samina Ahmad, Ashraf Khan
24	"Parhai Par Larai"	Angeline Malik	Khurram Abbas	15 December 2018
Cast: Hammad Farooqui, Madiha Zaidi, Manzoor Qureshi, Maryam Tahir
25	"Khushi"	Angeline Malik	Suraj Baba	22 December 2018
Cast: Angeline Malik, Ali Abbas, Hajra Yamin & Aly Khan
26	"Saat Samundar Paar Mohabbat"	Angeline Malik	Nimra Jamil	29 December 2018
Cast: Nausheen Ahmed, Zaheen Tahira, Laila Wasti & Farhan Ahmed Malhi

== Production ==
The series is produced by Angeline Malik who is known for her anthology work such as Sasural Ke Rang Anokhay (2012), Kitni Girhain Baaki Hain (2014), Kitni Girhain Baaki Hain (season 2) (2016) and Ustani Jee (2018). Like her previous series, she chose a different cast for each of the 26 episodes of the series, the sitcom being an anthology series.

== Accolades ==
Year	Award	Category	Recipient(s)	Result	Ref.
2019	3rd IPPA Awards 2019	Best Director TV Serial	Angeline Malik	Nominated	
2019	3rd IPPA Awards 2019	Best TV Serial -Viewer's choice	Kabhi Band Kabhi Baja	Nominated	
2019	3rd IPPA Awards 2019	Best Actress-Viewer's choice	Minal Khan	Nominated	
2019	3rd IPPA Awards 2019	Best Actor-Viewer's choice	Ahmed Hassan	Nominated	
