= Ishq Jalebi =

Pakistani televisions series

- title card
- Genre: Romance; Comedy; Family drama
- Written by: Saima Akram Chaudhry
- Directed by: Syed Wajahat Hussain
- Starring: Wahaj Ali; Madiha Imam; (For entire cast see below)
- Country of origin: Pakistan
- Original languages: Urdu & Punjabi
- No. of episodes: 33

Production
- Producer: Abdullah Kadwani
- Running time: 30-95 minutes
- Production company: 7th Sky Entertainment

Original release
- Network: Geo Entertainment
- Release: 14 April – 16 May 2021

Ishq Jalebi is a 2021 Pakistani romantic comedy television series, directed by Syed Wajahat Hussain and written by Saima Akram Chaudhry for 7th Sky Entertainment produced by Abdullah Kadwani and Asad Qureshi. It premiered on 14 April 2021 on Geo Entertainment and aired during Ramadan and Eid al-Fitr. It features Wahaj Ali and Madiha Imam as leads. The cast also included Noor ul Hassan, Qavi Khan, Mehmood Aslam and many others were also part of the cast. The drama emerged as a huge critical success and was highly appreciated by the audience.

== Plot ==
Muhammad Boota owns a decades old family business of catering. His wish to make both of his sons, Rafaqat and Sadaqat, a part of his business remains unfulfilled as his sons along with their families settle abroad. Disheartened by his sons, Muhammad Boota gives away his family business in the care of his only son-in-law, Ashiq Hussain, and grandson, Basim.

Basim, a handsome young man, dreams of moving abroad but is quite frustrated and complains about every inconvenience in his life. His cousin, Bela is a beautiful young girl, who has been living with her grandfather after the death of her parents. Being a sensible and hardworking girl, she disregards the attitude of Basim and the two of them are always arguing with each other.

The story takes a turn when everyone finds out about the split in ownership of the family business leading Rafaqat and Sadaqat just to visit Pakistan with their families but they get trapped due to the COVID-19 pandemic in Pakistan.

What begins as an unusual family reunion slowly escalates into a series of realizations, family bonding and a chance of young love. This family dramedy revolves around the question whether Basim and Bela would realize their true love for each other.

== Cast and characters ==
Name	Role	Notes
Wahaj Ali	Basim Hussain aka "Petha"	Although irascible and somewhat cynical, Basim is very caring and tender on the inside, with a great sense of duty. He lingers to move abroad to escape his tiring life. Love interest and later husband of Bela.
Madiha Imam	Bela Salahuddin/Bela Basim Hussain aka "Balushahi"	Initially involved in one-sided love for Basim. Bela is most beloved in the entire family. Love interest of and later wife of Basim; aspires to become an event planner.
Qavi Khan	Muhammad Boota	Grandfather of Basim and Bela; father of Rafaqat, Sadaqat, Iffat and late Nudrat; Boota has a business of catering "Babbu and Boota Bakery" (BnB) and wanted his sons to continue his legacy
Noor ul Hassan	Aashiq Hussain Advocate	Father of Basim; he is a lawyer and has lost all his 999 cases before joining father-in-law's business
Hina Khawaja Bayat	Iffat Aashiq Hussain	Mother of Basim; wife of Aashiq Hussain who is her cousin from paternal sister; daughter of Boota; sister of Rafaqat and Sadaqat
Usama Khan	Waqar Sadaqat Ali aka "Wicky Laddu"	Son of Sadaqat and Sajeela; wants to marry Bela
Shaista Jabeen	Aniqa "Nikki" Rafaqat Ali	Wife of Rafaqat; Sister of Sajjo; Cousin of Aashiq
Mehmood Aslam	Rafaqat "Riffi" Ali	Brother of Sadaqat and Iffat; son of Boota; he left his father as he is not interested in being a part continuing Boota's catering legacy and he has built his own independent life abroad in America, having laundry business
Kashif Mehmood	Sadaqat "Saqi" Ali	Brother of Rafaqat and Iffat; son of Boota; he left his father as he is least interested in being a part continuing Boota's catering legacy and he has built his own independent life abroad in Canada, having restaurant "Sialkoti Tarka"
Maryam Noor	Isha Rafaqat Ali aka "Barfi"	Daughter of Rafaqat and Aniqa, Wants to marry Basim, cheerful
Mariyam Nafees	Hina	Fraudster doing 'paper-marriage' business
Parveen Akbar	Bazgha Bakhtyar Chaudhary	Cousin of Boota
Irsa Ghazal	Sajeela "Sajjo" Sadaqat Ali	Wife of Sadaqat; Sister of Aniqa; Cousin of Aashiq
Syed Atif	Rocket	Worker and friend of Basim
Asim Mehmood	Gulfaam "Gullu" Chaudhary	Grandson of Bazgha, herbal specialist
Saife Hassan	Salahuddin	Late father of Bela
Munazzah Arif	Nudrat Salahuddin	Late daughter of Boota and mother of Bela
Salman Faisal	Hassan Sohail	Bela's ex-fiance
Humaira Bano		Hassaan's mother

== Soundtrack ==
Piya Piya Re

Soundtrack album by Wajhi Farooki Aishwarya Mukherjee
- Released: 14 April 2021
- Recorded: 2021
- Genre: Television soundtrack
- Length: 3:26
- Language: Urdu
- Label: 7th Sky Entertainment
- Producers: Abdul Kadwani; Asad Qureshi

Music video
- Ishq Jalebi OST on YouTube

The original soundtrack of Ishq Jalebi "Piya Piya Re" was written and sung by Wajhi Farooki. The lines of the song are frequently used during the course of the show. The original soundtrack was released on 14 April 2021. The song along with production is produced by Abdul Kadwani and Asad Qureshi.

== Awards and nominations ==
=== Lux Style Awards ===
Ceremony	Categories	Recipients	Result
21st Lux Style Awards	Best TV Long Play	Ishq Jalebi	Nominated
21st Lux Style Awards	Best TV Writer	Saima Akram Chaudhry	Nominated
