= Usama Khan =

Pakistani actor and model

- Born: 22 November 1991 (age 34); Gujranwala, Punjab, Pakistan
- Education: ACCA from SKANS
- Occupations: Actor; model
- Years active: 2017–present
- Known for: Sanwari as Tabrez
- Height: 5 ft 11 in (180 cm)

Usama Khan (born 22 November 1991) is a Pakistani television actor. Khan is best known for portraying the main role Tabrez in 2018 soap Sanwari for which he received Hum Award for Best Soap Actor. He further portrayed the main role in A-Plus TV's Bezuban and Hum TV's Main Khwab Bunti Hon. His other works in 2019 include Bisaat e Dil, Ghalati, and Haqeeqat. He also portrayed the pivotal role of Affan in Momina Duraid's Dobara.

== Early life and education ==
Khan was born and raised in Gujranwala, Punjab and did his early schooling at St. Peter's High School, in Toba Tek Singh. In 2011, he moved to Lahore to become a chartered account, and after completing his ACCA from the SKANS School of Accountancy, he worked for Silk Bank, an audit firm and a corporate company.

Since college days, he aspired to pursue a career in acting. Before becoming an actor he did a corporate job in the United Arab Emirates.

== Career ==
=== Early roles ===
In 2017, he made his acting debut with a supporting role in Urdu 1 series Mujhay Jeenay Do. In an interview, Khan said that director Angeline Malik helped him in getting a debut role and when he came to Karachi, she referred him to other television producers. He went on to play the supporting roles in PTV's Rasmain (2017), Hum TV's Bisaat-e-Dil (2018), TV One's Gori Ki Dukaan (2018) and episodic appearances in Ustani Jee.

=== Lead roles ===
He got his first lead role in Hum TV's Sanwari (2018) opposite Zainab Shabbir. Sanwari ran for 180 episodes and proved to be the breakthrough for him. It also earned him Hum Award for Best Soap Actor. He further played lead roles in Syed Atif Ali's directed Bezuban (2019) opposite Nawal Saeed and Adeel Qamar's directed Main Khwab Bunti Hon (2019) opposite Michelle Mumtaz. In addition to appearing as lead, he played a supporting role in the romantic drama Ghalati featuring Hira Mani and Affan Waheed in leads, family drama Tamanna opposite Haroon Shahid and Nausheen Ahmed and anthology series Dikhawa. Besides television, Khan appeared in brand TVC's including Silk Bank, Bold, Jazz and Nestle.

Khan played the Noriyan in Geo Entertainment's Uraan opposite Kinza Hashmi and Adeel Chaudhry which was produced by Abdullah Kadwani under 7th Sky Entertainment and Kaafur in Hum TV's horror series Chalawa produced by MD Productions and NJ Films.

He also played the role of Vicky in Geo Entertainment's Ramadan special Ishq Jalebi. Furthermore, he also stars in Hum TV's Sitam opposite Nawal Saeed, Moomal Khalid and Saad Qureshi produced by MD Productions and Gold Bridge Media and Geo Entertainment's Mohlat produced by 7th Sky Entertainment which features Kinza Hashmi, Sami Khan, Komal Aziz Khan, Bushra Ansari and Asma Abbas.

== Filmography ==
=== Television ===
Year	Title	Role	Network	Notes	Ref(s)
2017	Adhi Gawahi	Usama	Hum TV	TV debut; supporting role	
2017	Mujhay Jeenay Do	Dawood	Urdu 1	Supporting role	
2018	Gori Ki Dukaan	Rauf	Hum TV	Telefilm	
2018	Sanwari	Tabrez Ali	Hum TV	Lead role	
2018	Bisaat e Dil	Adil	Hum TV	Supporting role	
2018	Mohini Mansion Ki Cinderellayain	Azmat	Hum TV	Supporting role	
2019	Bezuban	Sahir	Hum TV	Lead role	
2019	Pakeeza Phuppo		Hum TV	Supporting role	
2019	Main Khwab Bunti Hoon	Rizwan Shah	Hum TV	Lead role	
2019	Ghalati	Fahad	ARY Digital	Supporting role	
2020	Tamanna	Umar	Geo Entertainment	Supporting role	
2020	Uraan	Noriyan	ARY Digital	Supporting role	
2020	Meray Dost Meray Yaar Season 2	Haaris	Geo Entertainment	Supporting role	
2020	Chalawa	Sarosh	Hum TV	Lead role	
2021	Noor	Nabeel	ARY Digital	Lead role	
2021	Ishq Jalebi	Waqar	Hum TV	Supporting role	
2021	Mohlat	Isa	ARY Digital	Supporting role	
2021	Sitam	Shayan	ARY Digital	Lead role	
2021	Mere Apne	Hamza	ARY Digital	Lead role	
2021	Dobara	Affan	Hum TV	Supporting role	
2022	Teri Rah Mein	Fakhar	ARY Digital	Lead role	
2022	Aik Sitam Aur	Shahroz	ARY Digital	Lead role	
2022	Siyani	Zohaib	Geo Entertainment	Lead role	
2022	Agar	Farooq	Hum TV	Lead role	
2023	Kacha Dhaga	Hamdan	Hum TV	Lead role	
2023	Tere Ishq Ke Naam	Altamash	ARY Digital	Lead role	
2023	Hostel	Zohaib	ARY Digital	Lead role	
2023	Fatima Feng	Ammar	Green Entertainment	Lead role	
2024	Ghair	Saalis	ARY Digital	Lead role	
2024	Sunn Mere Dil	Ammaar Ahmed	Geo Entertainment	Lead role	
2024	Qarz e Jaan	Barrister Burhan	Hum TV	Lead role	
2025	Kuch Na Kehna	Nouroz	Green Entertainment	Lead role	
2025	Hashtag	Nick	Geo Entertainment	Lead role	
2026	Chhup Chhup Kay	Zohaib Zarar Khan	Express Entertainment	Lead role	
2026	Marg E Wafa	Azar	Hum TV	Lead role	

==== Special appearances ====
Year	Title	Role	Network	Notes	Ref
2018	Ustani Jee	Zara's fiancé	Hum TV	Episode 7	
2019	Haqeeqat	Sarim	A-Plus TV	Episode "Badnaam Mohabbat"	
2020	Dikhawa	Cameo	Geo Entertainment	Episode "Alam Ara"	
2024	Siyaah	Salman	Green Entertainment	Episodes "Baharbano" and "Karsaaz"	
2024	Raaz	Hamza	Green Entertainment	Episode "Badla"	
2025	Ishq Di Chasni	Barrister Burhan Asim	Green Entertainment	Episode 32	

=== Films ===
Year	Title	Role	Notes
2024	Nayab	Zain	Film debut

== Awards and nominations ==
Year	Award	Category	Work	Result	Ref.
2019	7th Hum Awards	Best Soap Actor	Sanwari	Won	
