= Piya Naam Ka Diya =

- Written by: Samra Bukhari
- Directed by: Saleem Ghanchi
- Starring: Hammad Farooqui; Saniya Shamshad; Yashma Gill; Farhan Ahmed Malhi; Haris Waheed; Zainab Shabbir; Madiha Rizvi; Tipu Sharif; Hira Tareen; Mariya Khan
- Opening theme: "Kho Gayi Kahan" by Sahir Ali Bagga
- Country of origin: Pakistan
- Original language: Urdu
- No. of seasons: 1
- No. of episodes: 78

Production
- Producers: Abdullah Kadwani; Asad Qureshi
- Camera setup: Multi-camera setup
- Running time: 37-38 minutes
- Production company: 7th Sky Entertainment

Original release
- Network: Geo Entertainment
- Release: 23 July – 27 September 2019

Related
- Saibaan; Makafaat (TV series)

Piya Naam Ka Diya (Urdu: پیا نام کا دیا; English: Lamp of beloved's name) is a 2019 Pakistani romantic drama serial directed by Saleem Ghanchi, written by Samra Bukhari, produced by Abdullah Kadwani and Asad Qureshi under the 7th Sky Entertainment banner. The serial stars Saniya Shamshad, Yashma Gill and Farhan Ahmed Malhi. The serial was released in July 2019 on Geo Entertainment.

== Cast ==
- Farhan Ahmed Malhi as Waqas
- Saniya Shamshad as Naila
- Hammad Farooqui as Babar
- Ali Rizvi as Gulzar
- Tipu Shareef as Ishtiaq
- Arez Ahmed as Shayaan
- Madiha Rizvi as Razia
- Zainab Shabbir as Aaliya
- Mariya Khan as Shaheen
- Haris Waheed as Hammad
- Yashma Gill as Ramsha
- Hira Tareen as Roshanay
- Parveen Akhtar as Roshanay's mother

== Reception ==
The show became very popular and crossed 10+ TRPs, and was released on Viu under the same title towards the end of 2019.

== Soundtrack ==
The original soundtrack for Piya Naam Ka Diya was composed and sung by Sahir Ali Bagga, with lyrics by M. Mujtaba Sunny.
