= Badnaam (TV series) =

Pakistani television show

- Written by: Ghazala Naqvi
- Directed by: Mohsin Talat
- Starring: Ali Kazmi; Sanam Chaudhry; Zain Afzal; Naima Khan; Shameen Khan
- Country of origin: Pakistan
- No. of episodes: 29

Production
- Producers: Humayun Saeed; Shahzad Nasib
- Production company: Six Sigma Plus

Original release
- Release: 8 August 2017 – 4 March 2018

Badnaam is a Pakistani drama serial that that premiered on ARY Digital on 8 August 2017. The 29-episode serial was directed by Mohsin Talat, written by Ghazala Naqvi and was produced by Humayun Saeed and Shahzad Nasib under Six Sigma Plus. It stars Zain Afzal, Sanam Chaudhry, Ali Kazmi, Ahson Talish and many others.

== Cast ==
=== Main ===
- Sanam Chaudhry as Minahil
- Ali Kazmi as Afraaz Yazdani
- Zain Afzal as Jawad

=== Recurring ===
- Raeed Muhammad Alam as Mehroz
- Tabbasum Arif as Fahad's mother
- Shameen
- Naima Khan
- Ahson Talish
- Saba Faisal
- Behroze Sabswari
- Azra Mansoor as Nani
- Zhalay Sarhadi
