= Fitrat (TV series) =

2020 Pakistani television series

- Genre: Romance; Mystery
- Written by: Nuzhat Saman
- Directed by: Asad Jabal
- Starring: Saboor Aly; Ali Abbas; Mirza Zain Baig; Zubab Rana
- Country of origin: Pakistan
- Original language: Urdu
- No. of seasons: 1
- No. of episodes: 93

Production
- Producers: Abdullah Kadwani; Asad Qureshi
- Running time: 37-39 minutes
- Production company: 7th Sky Entertainment

Original release
- Network: Geo Entertainment
- Release: 2 November 2020 – 30 January 2021

Fitrat (Urdu: فطرت, lit. 'Nature') is a Pakistani romantic drama soap television series, produced by Abdullah Kadwani and Asad Qureshi under their banner 7th Sky Entertainment. It premiered on Geo Entertainment from 2 November 2020 to 30 January 2021. It is directed by Asad Jabal and written by Nuzhat Saman. It is digitally available on YouTube and in some countries on VIU App.

== Synopsis ==
Fariya finds her way out of the hardships of poverty through shortcuts. Her widowed mother, too, finds a distraction from hardship. Fariya's other two siblings, Rafiya and Haris, are poles apart when it comes to pursuing success as they choose to work their way up through honest means. When Fariya's extramarital affair is no longer hidden from her employer-turned-husband Shahbaz, she sets out in quest of another target. She crosses paths with Arbaaz and learns that there is so much she can use against Shahbaz after marrying his younger brother.

== Cast ==
- Saboor Aly as Fariya
- Ali Abbas as Shahbaz
- Mirza Zain Baig as Arbaaz
- Zubab Rana as Rafiya
- Zain Afzal as Bilal
- Sabiha Hashmi as Ayaz's mother - Shahbaz, Arbaaz and Alizeh grandmother
- Seemi Pasha as Abida - Shahbaz, Arbaaz and Alizeh’s mother
- Saife Hassan as Ayaz - Shahbaz, Arbaaz and Alizeh's father
- Fazila Qazi as Memoona - Maliha's mother
- Farhan Ali Agha as Javed - Maliha's father
- Adla Khan as Maliha
- Ayesha Gul as Sadia - Fariha, Rafiya and Haris’s mother
- Kamran Jilani as Khalid
- Mariyam Nafees as Alizeh
- Sadaf Aashan as Gulshan
- Raeed Muhammad Alam as Haris
- Rubab as Sana - Sadia and Khalid's daughter (child actress)

== Soundtrack ==
The original soundtrack O Zalim was sung by Sahir Ali Bagga and Aima Baig. Composed by Bagga himself, the lyrics were written by Muhammad Mujtaba.

Fitrat

Soundtrack album by Sahir Ali Bagga Aima Baig
- Genre: Theme song
- Language: Urdu
- Label: 7th Sky Entertainment
External audio
- "Fitrat" on SoundCloud

== Broadcast ==
The drama serial premiered on 2 November by replacing Uraan and aired an hour episode daily on Geo Entertainment. Since the series was getting recognition among the viewers, the channel often began to air mega episodes of two hours either on Wednesday or Tuesday.

== Production ==
The project was announced by the director Asad Jabal in early 2020. Jabal had previously directed Mera Rab Waris for the same channel.

It marked the fourth on-screen appearance of Saboor Aly with Ali Abbas after Naqab Zan, Haqeeqat, and Tum Ho Wajah while it was the second with Zubab Rana after Mere Khudaya. Abbas and Rana also appeared in Rishtay Biktay Hain.

=== PEMRA's advisory ===
The serial received a PEMRA advisory for airing inappropriate dialogues and content in mid-December 2020.

== Reception ==
The serial got much recognition among critics as well as audiences. The role of Saboor Aly received positive reviews from the critics. It maintained high TRP's throughout its run and was among the top dramas in TRP's chart. Due to its popularity, the serial was re-run on the same channel shortly after its end.

== Awards and nominations ==
Year	Awards	Category	Recipient	Result	Ref
9 October 2021	Lux Style Awards	Best Female Actor - Viewer's choice	Saboor Aly	Nominated	
9 October 2021	Lux Style Awards	Best Original Soundtrack	Sahir Ali Bagga and Aima Baig, composed by Sahir Ali Bagga	Nominated	
