= Malaal-e-Yaar =

Pakistani television series

- Genre: Thriller; Romance
- Written by: Hina Huma Nafees
- Directed by: Asad Jabbal
- Starring: Mirza Zain Baig; Azekah Daniel; Jahanzeb Gurchani; Hamza Firdous; Zainab Shabbir
- Theme music composer: Ahmed Jahanzeb
- Opening theme: "Malaal-e-Yaar OST" by Ahmed Jahanzeb & Nish Asher
- Country of origin: Pakistan
- Original language: Urdu
- No. of episodes: 54

Production
- Cinematography: Muhammad Aqeel; Hasnain Deswali
- Production company: MD Productions

Original release
- Network: Hum TV
- Release: 8 August 2019 – 13 February 2020

Malaal-e-Yaar (Urdu: ملالِ یار, lit. 'Regret of One's Beloved') is a Pakistani television serial produced by Momina Duraid under MD Productions. Based on the feudal system, it explores the ritual of early settled marriages. The main theme revolves around two persons from opposite backgrounds who hate each other, but eventually fall in love, bounded by a marriage only on paper. It stars Mirza Zain Baig, Azekah Daniel, Zainab Shabbir, Hamza Firdous and Jahanzeb Gorchani in leading roles. It gained local and foreign viewership soon after its first episode went on air.

== Plot ==
The story concerns a family of wealthy feudals whose head and heir are orthodox and follow century-old feudal mechanisms. The serial starts with parallel scenes of the protagonists; Balaj and Hooriya. Hooriya is a headstrong young girl living in the metropolitan city of Karachi and pursuing a quality education. She likes wearing Western clothes and rides a bike and is always ready to do any sort of social work. Balaj on the other hand is a feudal boy of a nearby village, where his taya Malik Shahbaz is the head of the district. Balaj's parents died when he was an infant and was raised by his aunt Surraya, Malik Shahbaz's wife. Being under his taya's supervision, Balaj has apparently turned out to be cruel and ill-mannered. He even gave up his studies as education was not valuable for him being the future head of his tribe. Not known to both Balaj and Hooriya is that they have been engaged since childhood, as Hooriya is the daughter of Malik Shahbaz's younger step-brother Malik Wajahat.

Wajahat fell in love with his college-mate Samreen and married her against the wishes of his family. His brother Malik Shahbaz has ever since blamed him for this act and does not give him the due recognition and respect which Wajahat deserves being part of the Malik family. In all matters of decision-making, Balaaj is above Wajahat. Succumbing to his family's pressure, Wajahat had got married for the second time to Saeeda, a girl chosen by his brothers, even when he was a father of two daughters with Samreen. It is told that Samreen had left the haveli of her in-laws when Malik Shahbaz got engaged her eldest daughter Hooriya to his nephew Balaaj when they were just five-year old kids. Not agreeing to this old tradition of early engagements and fearing that Balaj will be as orthodox as his uncle and her daughter will be just like other women of this family having no say and respect in their lives, Samreen left her husband and took her daughters to live a life of seclusion for their better future. Wajahat didn't bring them back for their own betterment but also was not strong enough to go against his brother's decisions. Unknown to his family, Wajahat secretly keeps vigilance of his wife and daughters and sends them financial assistance through his trusted slave Ghulam Din. Samreen has never told her daughters about Hooriya's engagement or about the whereabouts of their paternal family.

Hooriya is in love with her childhood friend Danish who runs a mobile shop. But Danish's mother does not like Hooriya for her boldness and extroversion. Samreen is also not in favor of Danish as she believes that if his mother does not approve of Hooriya then their marriage will not be successful.

One day, after Hooriya gives meal to an old street-seller, he is wounded by Balach's speeding vehicle, engaging him and Hooriya in a verbal brawl. Hooriya makes the wounded man to be put in Balach's car and taken to hospital. In hospital she makes Balach pay all expenses. Balach does this unwillingly and both him and Hooriya curse each other. Hence, from their very first meeting, Balach and Hooriya are at wits end.

Surraya, called Bi Jaan wants her daughter Amber (Maryam Noor) to be married to Balach. Bi Jaan loves Balach as her own son and considers him the best match for her daughter. Amber, unlike Balach is continuing her studies and is in love with her class-fellow Faiq (Faraz Farouqi). But she is hesitant to tell about him to her family as Faiq is from middle-class and she knows that her father will never approve his proposal.

Malik Shahbaz crowns Balach as the head of the panchayat (ignoring Wajahat) and also commits him to his daughter, thinking that Samreen and her daughters will never come back in their lives, so Balach and Hooriya's engagement doesn't exist anymore. Balach obediently agrees to this betrothment as his uncle's decision is the final order for him. Amber though very close to Balaaj as a cousin, is not happy about this engagement. She tells about Faiq to Bi Jaan, but as expected she rejects it knowing that Malik Shahbaz will never accept a son-in-law from a lesser background.

Seeing her husband's longing for his first wife and daughters, Saeeda one day visits Samreen. She asks her to return, to which Samreen refuses and asks her to leave. While leaving Saeeda meets Hooriya and her sister Minhal (Zainab Shabbir). She and Samreen lie to them that Saeeda is an old friend. Saeeda takes their picture for showing it to Wajahat and leaves. When she tells this to Wajahat, his reaction is not what she expects. He scolds her for interfering in his personal life and warns her not to go near his wife and daughters again. Saeeda once again realizes that only Samreen is Wajahat's love and she can never gain his trust.

Balaaj and Hooriya meet for the second time, which is as unfavorable as their first one. Balaaj splashes water on nearby walking Hooriya and Minhal. Hooriya as usual loses her temper and starts cursing Balaaj recognizing him from their previous meeting. Balaaj retaliates but they both are stopped from manhandling by Amber and Minhal.

Danish convinces his mother to ask Hooriya's hand in marriage and she does that reluctantly and they get engaged. Amber tells Faiq about her engagement and distances herself from him. Faiq is heart-broken to know that though he loves Amber but cannot get her due to their status difference. Faiq's mother is angry to know that Amber betrayed her son's loyalty by choosing her rich cousin over him. Danish and Faiq's mothers are relatives. They visit Samreen's place and on seeing Minhal, Faiq's mother immediately likes her for Faiq. They make Faiq and Minhal meet, and Faiq for overcoming Amber's loss, develops interest in Minhal.

Amber on the other hand is still in two minds in marrying Balaj.She asks Balaj to convince her father for delaying their marriage for few months to which he agrees. Amber again approaches Faiq. They both decide to run away. But on the night when Amber is leaving haveli, she is caught by Bi Jaan. After her mother makes her understand the importance of her background and Balaj as her life partner, Amber decides to stay and accepts Balaj as her man. Faiq is waiting for her in his car but when she doesn't turn up, he is again heartbroken on her betrayal.

Preparations start for Balaj and Amber's wedding. In city as well, there is a wedding which Hooriya's family is attending. During celebrations there is shooting in air and Samreen gets shot accidentally. Her condition is critical and the sisters don't have enough money for her surgery. Unwillingly, Hooriya calls Ghulam Din for help. On knowing about the accident, Wajahat arrives at the hospital and meets his daughters for the first time in years. Samreen is saved but she goes into comma. Wajahat decides to take his daughters to his haveli as he cannot leave them alone in the city.

So, Hooriya and Minhal arrive at their paternal house on the eve of Balaj and Amber's mayun ceremony. Except for Saeeda no one is happy to see them. On seeing Saeeda, they recognize her and after inquiring from a servant they get to know that she is in fact their step-mother. This makes them angry and initially they misbehave in response to Saeeda's motherly affection, accusing her of stealing their father from them and making their parents separate (none of them know that their mother actually left their father to prevent Balaj and Hooriya's marriage).

Amber sees Hooriya and Minhal and recognizes them. Balaj and Hooriya also encounter each other and are shocked to learn that they are indeed cousins.

Balaj and Hooriya's further meetings are also bloody ones. Once she is dragged by him with her arm for strolling outside the haveli without a dupatta. The next time he doesn't allow her to have dinner before their taya has arrived at the table. Hooriya starts to hate this household within the first few days of her arrival, primarily because of Balaj's presence and secondly due to the rigid regulations maintained by her taya Malik Shahbaz.

The main twist occurs in the story when Malik Shahbaz decides to marry Balaj to his childhood fiancé' Hooriya as she has now returned to her family. Being a staunch follower of his traditions, Malik Shahbaz doesn't even care about his daughter's happiness, who is about to become Balaj's bride, and gives his final decision to wed Balaj and Hooriya. Balaj on discovering that Hooriya is committed to him since childhood, also agrees to marry her, primarily because he considers Hooriya as his possession being his fiancé and secondly because he wants to somehow bring her under his command as she has always been repulsive towards him. Wajahat as before submits to his brother's command and tells his daughters about Malik Shahbaz's decision. Both Hooriya and Minhal are shocked to learn about Hooriya and Balaj's engagement and more shocked to know that their taya has cancelled his own daughter's marriage. Obviously, Hooriya's response is negative. On the other hand, Amber is shattered about what her parents are doing to her. She retaliates to her mother that she agreed to leave the man she loved for Balaj and now how can they take Balaj from her. Bi Jaan is also helpless. Even Balaj cannot support Amber as he agreed to marry her only because of his taya's orders otherwise, he never had any feelings for her. Balaj admits to Amber that he hates Hooriya but is doing so only on his taya's orders and for fulfilling his family traditions. Amber is heartbroken.

Hooriya and Minhal realize that Saeeda is not pretending to be good to them, in fact she does care for them. She even agrees to help Hooriya out of this turmoil. Saeeda makes a plan for the sisters to escape. As a ritual, Hooriya is taken to a shrine before wedding and from there, Saeeda makes them flee. Hooriya is in constant contact with Danish who is waiting for them in Karachi. As they escape from the shrine, Balaj and his men catch them in the bus they are travelling and forcefully take them to a hut and lock them. There Balaj beats Hooriya for cursing their taya and takes her mobile away as Danish is calling her, but during all this neither Balaj gets to know about Hooriya's engagement with Danish nor that it is Danish to whom Hooriya is in contact with. Finally, Hooriya agrees to marry Balaj as he points a gun at Minhal and their Nikah is officiated under force and threat.

Thereon, another chapter starts in Balaj and Hooriya's life. Both are aggressive towards each other. Hooriya has vowed not to accept him as her husband and is rebellious at all fronts. Balaj on the other hand is squeezed between his anger towards Hooriya and his taya's set standards for treating a wife. He initially puts unwanted regulations on her and makes her realize that like every other wife in the haveli she is just equal to his shoes. Yet, Balaj maintains a distance from Hooriya, not allowing himself near her without her permission. Despite Balaj and Hooriya's soft and rough skirmishes, both become habitual of each other and Hooriya also takes her final exams while living in the haveli.

Faiq and Minhal get engaged much to Amber's shock that the man she loved has returned to her life as her cousin's fiancé'. Faiq is still confused for his feelings for Amber but is determined to marry Minhal only.

Samreen awakens from comma. Hooriya decides to take her to their house and not haveli and asks Wajahat not to tell her about Hooriya's marriage before she has fully recovered. Much to Balaj's disappointment, Hooriya goes to Karachi. During her absence, Balaj develops some feelings for her but is unable to accept them as he recalls his taya's words that a wife is no more than a subordinate.

Samreen is worried about her daughters' marriages. She is keen upon marrying Hooriya and Danish at the earliest. This is not helping Hooriya who does not want to break the news of her marriage to her mother at the moment. But Danish's mother tells Samreen about Hooriya's marriage with Balaj. This makes Samreen collapse once again as her twenty-year old struggle went in vain. Wajahat then decides to take Samreen to the haveli as Minhal alone cannot look after her. Bi Jaan convinces Malik Shahbaz and he agrees too. At the haveli, Saeeda attends to Samreen and takes her responsibility.

Hooriya tops in her examination. Minhal makes Balaj realize that he should also applaud her like everyone else. So, he brings flower bracelets for her and somehow tells her that he specially bought them for her. Hooriya likes this gesture of his. This is the first time she develops feelings for Balaj but doesn't realize it herself.

There is a parallel story of Banu, a servant's daughter. She is in love with Waseem (Ghulam Din's son) but her father has fixed her marriage to an elderly man Qadeer. Qadeer is from a rival political party, therefore, keeping their interest safe Malik Shahbaz and Balaj agree to marry Banu to him. They lock Banu in a stable. When Hooriya learns about this, she first frees Banu from her imprisonment and then makes her escape with Waseem to Karachi with Danish's help. By doing this Hooriya feels at peace as she did what she could not do for herself when she was made to lose the man she loved. She also confesses this to Bi Jaan but Bi Jaan does not let Malik Shahbaz know about it.

One day Balaj on taya's orders is going towards their rivals. Hooriya forbids him from taking a gun, once again bringing the subject of her forceful marriage to him under the influence of the same gun. When Balaj doesn't listen to her, Hooriya angrily leaves the room saying that she does not earn his respect as a wife as he brought her in his life forcibly. On hearing this Balaj drops the gun and leaves without it. When Hooriya sees it, she feels happy that Balaj for the first time listened to her and feels content about it.

On his way, Balaj gets shot in the arm.

Hooriya is worried about him being wounded like that. Balach angrily blames her for his condition as she delayed his departure and not let him take his gun. He refuses to take medicine from her, but Hooriya does not give up and Balaj finally surrenders to her privilege as his wife. All night long, Hooriya attends to an unconscious Balaj as a duty-full wife and tiredly falls asleep at his feet. When Balaj wakes up in the morning, he is surprised to find Hooriya near him with first aid. Later-on when Balaj asks her whether she is taking care of him because she has developed a soft corner for him, Hooriya refuses and says that she would have done the same for any other sick person and that she can never fall in love with him as she can never forget that he forced her to marry him, much to Balaj's disappointment.

Hooriya then explores her feelings for Balaj. She is not able to accept the fact that she is drawing near to him and has started to care for him (as her forced Nikah is still fresh in her memory). She vows in her heart not to love him ever. Yet again, she is all the time worrying about him and attends to him as his wife.

Bi Jaan wants to get Minhal married to Faiq at the earliest as Amber is giving her a tough time and she fears that she might ruin Minhal's engagement. Once their wedding date is fixed, Amber is more than outrageous. She has lost both her men to Hooriya and Minhal and plans to avenge them. In her first revengeful act, she tells her father that Hooriya made Banu escape. This makes Malik Shahbaz go mad and orders Hooriya to be locked up in the same place as Banu. Saeeda informs Balaj and he interferes. He confronts his taya saying that Hooriya is his wife and he cannot let anyone harm her like that as that will be against his manhood. Malik Shahbaz though shocked at this change in Balach, does not say anything more.

Hooriya instantly accepts her hidden feelings for Balach, as it was the first time he made her know her importance in his life. She confesses to herself that she has fallen in love with him. Finally, she also admits to Balach that she loves him. Balach at first denies his feelings for her but eventually fails to resist further.

Malik Shahbaz is now regretting his decision of marrying Balach to Hooriya as he sees that she has changed him. Amber takes advantage of this moment and makes her father realize that he is being punished for ruining his daughter's happiness. She further tells him that she likes Faiq and wants to marry him and asks her father to compensate her loss of Balach by marrying her with Faiq. A regretful Malik Shahbaz decides to fulfill his daughter's wish. He makes his men kidnap Faiq and asks him to marry Amber instead of Minhal. But on Faiq's refusal he makes a vicious plan. For winning the upcoming elections and for avenging Faiq for his refusal, Malik Shahbaz decides to get Faiq killed for putting the blame on his rival parties for gaining sympathy votes, as the entire village knows that Faiq is his future son-in-law. He discusses this with Balaj who discourages the idea, saying that Faiq is Minhal's fiancé' and an innocent man. On seeing Balaj's reluctance, Malik Shahbaz carries out his plan on his own and orders his men to kill Faiq, which Ghulam Din overhears.

Thus, one day when Faiq is taking Samreen for her check-up, he is attacked by gunmen. In a struggle, the bullet hits Samreen and she dies. Balaj confronts his taya as he realizes that it was his doing. He tells him that from now on he will never participate in his wrongdoings.

After Samreen's death, Bi Jaan and Saeeda decide not to delay Minhal's wedding. Malik Shahbaz cannot stop it as he knows that Balaj will interfere. But Amber is all keen to stop this marriage. During Danish's condolence call to Hooriya, she overhears her and by trick takes his phone number from her mobile. She realizes Danish to be Hooriya's former lover. She makes a plan to separate Faiq and Minhal. Amber calls Danish and convinces him to help her stop their marriage and in return, she will separate Balach and Hooriya so that Danish can have her back in his life. Danish who is still loyal to Hooriya and is not accepting any other woman in his life, agrees to do so.

Amber takes Hooriya for shopping and leaves her alone for Danish to interact with her and takes a picture of them. Danish asks Hooriya whether she is happy in her married life, to which she replies in the affirmative and confesses that she loves Balach and drives him away. Danish then calls Balach telling him that his wife loves someone else and is still in contact with him and sends him their picture which Amber took.

Balach gets suspicious. On Hooriya's questioning, he asks her whether she loved someone else. Hooriya in a shock doesn't answer at the moment but then tries to explain it to Balach. But he seems to have lost his trust in her and regrets falling in love with her.

On Minhal's mayun, Malik Shahbaz decides not to have Faiq present in the ceremony. Faiq is not happy to know this. Amber and Danish have a plan for stopping the wedding. Once his mother leaves for the haveli, Danish tactfully makes Faiq to go and meet Minhal personally. Amber also convinces Minhal to let Faiq inside her room for a moment and no one shall know.

Balach is still not talking to Hooriya. Minhal removes his misunderstanding by telling him that Danish was their neighbor since childhood and their mother formally fixed their engagement. She also tells him that now Hooriya only loves him and that he should never leave her or suspect her of not loving him. A relaxed Balach then reconciles with her.

Faiq comes to meet Minhal but is caught in her room. Malik Shahbaz is outrageous at the indecency shown by him and as already does not want Minhal to marry Faiq, calls off their wedding. Amber and Danish are happy on their achievement and Amber thinks that she can get Faiq now. But due to Saeeda's insistence for her daughter's happiness, Malik Shahbaz softens and allows the marriage to proceed as planned, much to Amber's disappointment.

After the wedding, Amber is leaving the haveli as she has lost everything. Bi Jaan tries to stop her but in the struggle she falls down the stairs when Amber pushes her. Bi Jaan dies and Amber loses her senses for causing her mother's death. On doctors' advice, she is admitted to a mental hospital. Danish now realizing his mistake for trying to ruin Hooriya and Minhal's lives, tells everything to Hooriya for relieving his guilt. Hooriya slashes out at him and warns him of ever coming near her again. Under the weight of his guilt, Danish commits suicide.

One day Malik Shahbaz's men see Waseem working in Karachi and inform him. He immediately orders them to kill both Waseem and Banu for going against his orders. Days pass and Hooriya realizes Ghulam Din being absent from his duties. She visits him at his place and he tells her that his son and Banu have been killed on Malik Shahbaz's orders. Hooriya is shattered to know this but the worst comes further as Ghulam Din discloses to her that her taya was behind her mother's murder as well. Hooriya at once confronts her taya and tells him that she will put him behind bars. Hooriya calls Balach and tells him that she is about to do something terrible to which he gives the nod. Malik Shahbaz asks Balach to control his wife otherwise he will do it himself. Balach gets infuriated and declares war against his taya proclaiming that what he did was wrong and now whatever Hooriya will do, he will support her and between his taya and his wife, Balach will stand like a wall. Wajahat overhears all this and squares up his brother for killing his wife.

Balach joins Hooriya at the police station, where Hooriya does a press briefing about Malik Shahbaz's wrongdoings and Balach and Ghulam Din get the FIR registered for the murders. Malik Shahbaz is finally arrested.

In the last scene, it is shown that Balaj takes Hooriya's hand while going to the family gathering, signifying that she will always be beside him in all matters, breaking the year-old traditions of his family, where wives were treated disrespectfully. Hooriya shows her gratitude towards Saeeda for being a mother to her and Minhal and that now she will take on Bi Jaan's responsibilities. Balaj puts the tribal pagri on Wajahat's head saying that it belongs to him as he is the next heir and leader of the tribe after Malik Shahbaz and not Balaj.

== Cast ==
- Mirza Zain Baig as Malik Balaj - the nephew and heir of Malik Shahbaz
- Azekah Daniel as Hooriya Balaj Malik - elder daughter of Malik Wajahat with his first wife Samreen, wife of Malik Balaj
- Jahanzeb Gurchani as Malik Shahbaz - titled 'Malik Sarkar', he is the patriarch of the Malik family and the village head
- Zainab Shabbir as Minhal Wajahat - Hooriya's younger sister
- Maryam Noor as Amber Shahbaz - only child of Malik Sarkar
- Sohail Sameer as Malik Wajahat - Malik Sarkar's younger brother and Hooriya and Minhal's father
- Humaira Bano as Samreen Wajahat - first wife of Malik Wajahat
- Natasha Ali as Saeeda Wajahat - second wife of Wajahat
- Seemi Pasha as Suraiya Shahbaz (Bi Jaan)- wife of Malik Sarkar and matriarch of the Malik family
- Farah Nadir as Danish's mother
- Hamza Firdous as Danish - Hooriya's ex-boyfriend.
- Faraz Farooqui as Faiq - Amber's ex-boyfriend and Minhal's husband.
- Hani Taha as Shabana - Suraiya's friend

== Reception ==
It received critical a claim for its subject of feudalism. The main feature of its large viewership was Malik Balaaj's character, performed by Mirza Zain Baig and the chemistry between Zain and Azekah Daniel as the lead romantic couple of the serial was praised. In a review by Javaria Farooqui published in the DAWN Images, the reviewer critiqued the portrayal of the heroine being kidnapped by her paternal cousin and compelled to sign the marriage contract, only to later fall in love with the errant and wayward hero.

The love-hate relation between the protagonists and their ultimate love story widely got TRP's from the viewers and achieved 7.2 TRPs at its highest followed by 6.9.
