= Shehr-e-Malal =

Pakistani TV series

- Genre: Family drama
- Written by: Sadia Akhter
- Directed by: Furqan Adam
- Starring: Maria Wasti; Hajra Yamin; Ali Abbas; Shahood Alvi; Rabya Kulsoom
- Opening theme: "Shehr-e-Malal" by Sanam Marvi
- Composer: Waqar Ali
- Country of origin: Pakistan
- Original language: Urdu
- No. of seasons: 1
- No. of episodes: 26

Production
- Producer: Zeeshan Khan
- Camera setup: Multi-Camera setup
- Running time: Approx. 42-43 Minutes
- Production company: TNI Productions

Original release
- Network: Express Entertainment
- Release: 13 February – 3 September 2020

Shehr-e-Malal (Urdu: شہر ملال, lit. 'City of Regret') is a 2020 Pakistani family drama television series, which premiered on Express Entertainment on 13 February 2020. Produced by Zeeshan Khan under TNI Productions, it stars Maria Wasti, Shahood Alvi, Hajra Yamin and Ali Abbas in the lead roles. This serial was shot in approximately 2018 but its release was delayed and it was telecast two years later.

== Plot ==
Tabinda (Maria Wasti) and Umer Hasan (Shahood Alvi) once were in a relationship are now heading their own families. As a result of misunderstandings, they broke off and part ways in the past. Tabinda married a rich business man and is now taking care of her husband's business as he's disabled, whereas Umer married the daughter of a business tycoon. The story takes a new turn when both meet after several years. Tabinda goes to Umer's house and asked for his daughter Rameen (Hajra Yamin)'s proposal for Shazir (Ali Abbas). Shazir is Tabinda's step-son and both Shazir & Rameen are in love with each other. Umer eventually denied the proposal. Broken heart Rameen tries to attempt suicide. Tabinda spread the suicidal act of Rameen to defame Umer which got attention of media. Umer helpless before Rameen, begs Tabinda to accept his daughter. This time, Tabinda agrees for the proposal and plans to take revenge from Umer's daughter. Tabinda created misunderstandings between Shazir and Rameen after marriage, but eventually she created problem for herself that result in her own family's loss.

== Cast ==
- Maria Wasti as Tabinda
- Hajra Yamin as Rameen
- Ali Abbas as Shazir
- Shahood Alvi as Umer; Rameen's father
- Rabya Kulsoom as Maria; Rameen's sister
- Zainab Qayyum as Rameen's mother
- Humaira Zaheer as Minal's aunt
- Afshan Qureshi as Tabinda's mother
- Raeed Muhammad Alam as Kamran
- Ayub Khoso
- Srha Asghar as Minal
- Fauzia Mushtaq
- Imran Raza
