= Qarz e Jaan =

2024 Pakistani television series

- Genre: Drama; Thriller
- Created by: Momina Duraid
- Showrunner: Momina Duraid
- Written by: Rabia Razzaque
- Screenplay by: Rabia Razzaque
- Directed by: Saqib Khan
- Starring: Yumna Zaidi; Usama Khan; Nameer Khan; Deepak Perwani
- Opening theme: Gila Hai Kiya Tera by Quratulain Balouch
- Ending theme: Gila Hai Kiya Tera by Quratulain Balouch
- Composer: Adrain David
- Country of origin: Pakistan
- Original language: Urdu
- No. of seasons: 1
- No. of episodes: 32

Production
- Producer: Momina Duraid
- Production locations: Karachi,Sindh, Pakistan
- Camera setup: Multi-camera setup
- Running time: 37 minutes
- Production company: MD Productions

Original release
- Network: Hum TV
- Release: 17 November 2024 – 20 April 2025

Qarz-e-Jaan is a 2024 Pakistani television series, directed by Saqib Khan and written by Rabia Razzaque. The series is produced by Momina Duraid under the production banner of MD Productions. It stars Yumna Zaidi, Usama Khan and Nameer Khan as leads. The series revolves around two lawyers, delving into the societal issues leading to oppression and injustice. The first episode was broadcast on 17 November 2024 on Hum TV.

== Plot ==
Nashwa Behzaad, a young woman whose life is marked by unforeseen struggles that lead her into a fierce battle for justice. Challenged by external forces, familial dynamics and inner conflicts, Nashwa embodies resilience as she confronts the darkness that threatens to consume her.

== Themes ==
Qarz e Jaan explores themes of love, companionship, and emotional needs of older individuals, especially widows, the importance of career and independence for women, and the impact of poor parenting on individuals and society.

== Cast ==
=== Main ===
- Yumna Zaidi as Nashwa Behzaad : Bisma and Behzaad's daughter; Asim's step daughter; Burhaan's love interest.
- Usama Khan as Barrister Burhaan Hassan : Asim's adoptive son; Bisma's step son; Nashwa's love interest.
- Nameer Khan as Ammar Bakhtiar : Bakhtiar and Sidra's son; Beenish's brother; Nashwa's ex husband.
- Tazeen Hussain as Bisma Asim (nee Jameel; formerly Behzaad) : Jameel and Ruksana's daughter; Behzaad's widow; Asim's wife; Nashwa's mother; Burhaan's step mother.
- Faisal Rehman as Asim Ahmad: Sabreena and Asghar's son; Burhan's adoptive father; Bisma's second husband.
- Deepak Parwani as Bakhtiyar Ahmad : Barkat's son; Sidra's husband; Beenish and Ammar's father.
- Sakina Samo as Barkat Ahmad: Bakhtiar and Behzaad's mother.
- Anika Zulfiqar as Faryal Jehangir : Jehangir and Qudsia's daughter.
- Daniyal Aamir as Asad Raza: Sohail and Afshan's son; Beenish's husband.
- Salma Asim as Sidra Bakhtiar : Bakhtiar's wife; Beenish and Ammar's mother.
- Ismat Zaidi as Sabreena Asghar : Asghar's widow; Asim's mother.
- Fajr Sheikh as Beenish "Beenu" Raza (nee Bakhtiar) : Bakhtiar and Sidra's daughter; Asad's wife; Ammar's sister.
- Tabbasum Arif as Qudsia Jehangir : Jehangir's wife; Sidra's sister; Faryal's mother.
- Ramesha Nawal as Maheen Majid : Ammar's ex-girlfriend.

== Production ==
In June 2024, it reported that Zaidi, Khan and Shuja Asad would star in Amna Mufti's written Andher Nagri, directed by Amin Iqbal. Nevertheless, further reports confirmed the series' title change to Khoon Baha, with Rabia Razzaq as writer and Saqib Khan as director. Additionally, Nameer Khan had replaced Asad. Hussain disclosed her portrayal of Zaidi's mother, alongside Rehman. It marked Khan and Zaidi's second on-screen appearance previously starred in 2024 film Nayab. The official posters and teasers were unveiled in November, with changed title, Qarz-e-Jaan.

== Reception ==
=== Critical reception ===
Oyeyeah reviewed the first episode and stated that "After watching the first episode, it is noted that the ensemble cast effectively sets the stage for the unfolding narrative and conflicts ahead. The initial episode successfully establishes the characters’ backgrounds and motivations, leaving viewers eager to learn more about their journeys".

A review in the Khaleej Times praised the plot twists in the series.

Sadaf Shabbir of the DAWN Images critiqued the series for implying that the heroine's resistance to her abusive husband was only justified after he committed a more severe crime, murder, rather than his earlier crimes, including rape.

The ending of the series was widely commented by fans and in the domestic and international media.
