= Joru Ka Ghulam (2016 TV series) =

2016 Pakistani television serial

- Title screen
- Genre: Family drama Romantic drama
- Created by: Babar Javed
- Written by: Seema Ghazal
- Directed by: Syed Atif Hussain
- Country of origin: Pakistan
- Original language: Urdu
- No. of episodes: 40

Production
- Producer: Babar Javed
- Production locations: Karachi, Pakistan
- Camera setup: Multi-camera setup

Original release
- Network: Geo Entertainment
- Release: 13 July – 21 October 2016

Joru Ka Ghulam (Urdu: جورو کا غُلام, lit. 'Henpecked') is a 2016 Pakistani drama television series that aired on Geo Entertainment from 13 July to 21 October 2016. The serial is produced by Babar Javed.

== Plot ==
The story is about a strict man, Moazzam, and his family. Moazzam is strict because of the people who attacked his family when his sister left her house due to her love. Moazzam began to hate women. He argued with his second wife, Uzma, over small matters. His children ignore his misbehavior.

Moazzam has four sons, Sarbuland, Balaj, Waleed and Saadi. Moazzam's anger causes unhappiness among his sons' wives, who then pressure the sons to leave home so they might enjoy a peaceful life. The men are unwilling to go against their mother, Uzma, and she does not want them to leave.

Elder son Sarbuland is initially married to an educated lady, Sharmeen. They move away from the father's house because of Moazzam. Sharmeen dies shortly thereafter in a car accident prompting Sarbuland to return to his father's house. He returns to the way he lived before the marriage.

Second son Balaj married his college love, Suhaina, without Moazzam becoming aware this is the son's love. When he discovers this, he forces Balaj to divorce Suhaina. After the divorce, Suhaina marries an uneducated boy Mitho, the cousin of Naghma (Waleed's wife). Balaj comes to realize his mistake in divorcing Suhaina, and goes to Mitho's house to ask Suhaina to marry him once. However, Suhaina refuses, as she is happy with Mitho. After this, Balaj ended up alone, while Mitho and Suhaina move to Dubai.

Third son Waleed who was forced to marry an uneducated, greedy and traitorous woman. Uzma is not happy with this marriage, as Waleed is in love with his business partner, Beena. Waleed obeyed his father's order and married his servant's daughter Naghma. Naghma's conservative background made her greedy and she wants that either Waleed or herself should own the entire Moazzam's property. For this purpose she made evil plans to irritate Moazzam about the rest of his family. Her husband Waleed went to Lahore in order to marry Beena, but she did not agree. Waleed came back home when Naghma bore a baby boy Raza and started taking interest in his father's business.

Fourth son Saadi, who is mentally ill, married Natasha. Natasha, annoyed by his husband behavior, left him but soon Saadi brought her back.

All the sons get on a single platform when doctor says that Moazzam has terminal cancer. Moazzam realizes that he did wrong with his family and begs their forgiveness. In the end, Moazzam died.

== Cast ==
- Mehmood Aslam as Moazzam
- Ghazala Butt as Uzma
- Kanwar Arsalan as Balaj
- Fatima Effendi as Suhaina
- Kamran Jilani as Sarbuland
- Asad Siddiqui as Waleed
- Hadi Firdous as Saadi
- Sadia Ghaffar as Naghma
- Minal Khan as Natasha
- Natasha Ali as Sharmeen
- Salahuddin Tunio as Khalid – Moazzam's friend
- Anam Tanveer
- Shehzad Ali Khan as Ishtiaq – Naghma's father
- Rozin Ulfat
- Khalid Zafar
- Sarfaraz Ashraf as Mitho – Ishtiaq's neighbor
- Muhammad Hanif as Razi – Sharmeen's father
- Fouzia Mushtaq as Ismat Jahan – Razi's sister and Sharmeen's phuppo
- Raeed Muhammad Alam as Ghazali
- Shazia Qaiser as Ghazali's mother

== See also ==
- List of Pakistani television series
- List of programs broadcast by Geo Entertainment
