= Maya (2015 Pakistani film) =

- Theatrical release poster
- Directed by: Jawad Bashir
- Story by: Hina Jawad
- Produced by: Hina Jawad
- Production company: Twister Films
- Release date: 12 June 2015 (Pakistan)
- Country: Pakistan
- Language: Urdu
- Box office: Rs. 2 crore (US$72,000)

Maya (transl. Illusion) is a 2015 Pakistani horror film which was the directorial debut of Jawad Bashir and was produced by Hina Jawad under the production banner Twister Films. The film's cast included Ahmed Abdul Rehman, Hina Jawad, Zain Afzal, Sheikh Mohammad Ahmed and Anam Malik. Hina Jawad played the lead role of Maya in the film.

The film was released nationwide on 12 June 2015.

== Plot ==
5 friends make a plan to live in a farmhouse. One night they attend a party in which a brutal murder happens. Nida watching this murder is in deep shock. Later they found that the farmhouse is haunted. They consult a priest for exorcism.

== Cast ==
- Hina Jawad as Maya/Mishal
- Ahmed Abdul Rehman as Waqas
- Zain Afzal as Sam
- Anam Malik as Rida
- Rasheed Ali as Priest
- Sheikh Mohammad Ahmed as Amir
- Ali Aftab (special appearance)
- Jawad Bashir (special appearance)

== Production ==
=== Marketing ===
A teaser trailer and poster were revealed by official Facebook on 2 May 2015. The film trailer was reviewed by DAWN.com as "Given that a good screenplay and creative cinematography couldn't save Siyaah from a poor box office performance, Maya can hardly be expected to haunt the audience."

== Release ==
The film had its premiere at Super Cinema in Lahore on 11 June 2015, and the film was released nationwide on the next day (12 June).

== See also ==
- List of directorial debuts
- List of Pakistani films of 2015
