= Resham Gali Ki Husna =

Pakistani situation comedy

- Genre: Sitcom; Romance; Comedy; Drama
- Created by: Shahzad Javed
- Written by: Hassan Imam
- Directed by: Kamran Akbar Khan
- Presented by: Hum TV
- Starring: Komal Meer; Inayat Khan; Zain Afzal; Fareeha Jabeen; Kashif Mehmood; Fazila Qazi
- Country of origin: Pakistan
- Original language: Urdu
- No. of seasons: 1
- No. of episodes: 26

Production
- Producer: Momina Duraid
- Production locations: Karachi, Sindh
- Camera setup: Multi-camera setup
- Running time: 46 Minutes
- Production company: MD Productions

Original release
- Network: Hum TV, Hum Network Limited
- Release: 21 July 2019 – 19 January 2020

Resham Gali Ki Husnaa (Urdu: ریشم گلی کی حسنہ, lit. 'Husna from Resham Street') is a 2019 Pakistani sitcom series written by Hassan Imama, developed by Shahzad Javed, Head of Content, HUM TV, directed by Kamran Akbar Khan, and produced by Momina Duraid under their production banner MD Productions. It has Komal Meer and Inayat Khan in leads while Zain Afzal, Fazila Qazi, Kashif Mehmood, and Afraz Rasool in pivot roles.

== Synopsis ==
It is the story of Husnaa, the girl living in the street of Resham Gali, and her problem solving attitude towards other peoples resides in her neighbours.

== Cast ==
- Komal Meer as Husna
- Inayat Khan as Hyder
- Zain Afzal as Sharif
- Natasha Ali as Shehrbano
- Kashif Mehmood as Husna's father
- Kanwal Khan as Fatima
- Fazila Kaiser as Safia
- Saima Qureshi as Razia
- Khalid Anam as Master Sahib
- Sabahat Aadil as Ghausia
- Afraz Rasool as Jamil
- Bilal Qureshi
- Srha Asghar
