= Kuch Na Kaho (TV series) =

Pakistani television series

- Emmad Irfani (left) and Naveen Waqar
- Genre: Drama; Telenovela; Family drama; Romantic Drama
- Based on: Sabz Ruton Ka Pehla Phool
- Written by: Rahat Jabeen
- Directed by: Ilyas Kashmiri
- Starring: Naveen Waqar; Emmad Irfani; Mariyam Nafees; Huma Nawab; Asad Zaman Khan; Abid Ali; Ismat Zaidi; Hira Hussain; Zainab Jameel; Shazia Naz; Zainab Qayyum; Umer Naru
- Opening theme: "Kuch Na Kaho" by Afshan Fawad
- Country of origin: Pakistan
- Original language: Urdu
- No. of episodes: 48

Production
- Producer: Momina Duraid
- Production locations: Karachi and Islamabad
- Camera setup: Multi-camera setup
- Running time: 40 minutes
- Production company: MD Productions

Original release
- Network: Hum TV, Hum Network Limited
- Release: 31 October 2016 – 18 April 2017

Kuch Na Kaho (Urdu: کچھ نہ کہو; lit: Don't Say Anything) is a Pakistani drama serial which is based on a novel named Sabz Ruton Ka Pehla Phool by Rahat Jabeen. The serial aired on Hum TV on 31 October 2016. It would air Mondays and Tuesdays at 9:10 pm. Before this, Hatheli occupied the slot but after eight episodes, it switched to Wednesdays and Thursdays 9:10 pm slot, giving way to Kuch Na Kaho. It stars Naveen Waqar and Emmad Irfani in leading roles. The last of the serial's 48 episodes aired on 18 April 2017.

== Production ==
In October 2016, Naveen Waqar revealed that her upcoming television series Kuch Na Kaho with MD Productions would be an "emotional rollercoaster ride". In December, it reported that Waqar has been shooting the series.

== Cast ==
- Naveen Waqar as Ayna "Aani"
- Emmad Irfani as Mohsin
- Asad Zaman Khan as Imran
- Shazia Naz as Sajal
- Mirza Zain Baig as Faraz
- Hira Hussain as Annie
- Maryam Nafees as Tabinda "Taabi"
- Hina Altaf as Rania
- Raeed Muhammad Alam as Maaz
- Zainab Jameel as Nadia (dead)
- Huma Nawab as Nayyara (dead)
- Abid Ali as Sohail (dead)
- Umer Naru as Afaaq
- Ismat Zaidi as Zainab
- Zainab Qayyum as Aliya
- Agha Jararuddin as Aashir
- Fouzia Mushtaq as Zubaida
- Shahid as Noman
- Neema Alam
- Zainab Fatima (child actor) as the young Tabinda "Taabi"
- Rashida Tabassum

== See also ==
- List of programs broadcast by Hum TV
- 2016 in Pakistani television
