= Zainab Shabbir =

Pakistani television actress

- Born: 26 June 1998 (age 27); Karachi, Pakistan
- Education: Bachelor of Commerce
- Occupation: Actress
- Years active: 2018–present
- Known for: Sanwari; Emaan

Zainab Shabbir (born 26 June 1998) is a Pakistani television actress. She is best known for appearing in the dramas Sanwari, Piya Naam Ka Diya, Malaal-e-Yaar, Haqeeqat, Makafaat, Dikhawa, Mehar Posh, and Yaar Na Bichray. She was last seen as Sonia in Fareb (2023).

== Career ==
In 2018, Shabbir was picked by Momina Duraid and Sultana Siddiqui of the Hum Network to play the supporting role of Ishmal in Hum TV's Maa Sadqay. She then played the lead role of Ujala in Sanwari opposite Usama Khan for which she earned the Best Soap Actress nomination at Hum Awards. Shabbir coloured her skin a few shades darker for the project's 180-episode run. Her character, a plain-clothed, middle-class girl, was reminiscent of Sanam Saeed’s Kashaf in the iconic 2012 play Zindagi Gulzar Hai.

In 2019, she was cast as the strong and independent female protagonist in LTN’s Emaan that ran for 73 episodes. She also appeared as Aaliya in Saleem Ghanchi's Piya Naam Ka Diya with Saniya Shamshad and Farhan Malhi, and as Minhal in Asad Jabal's Malaal-e-Yaar alongside Azekah Daniel and Mirza Zain Baig. The latter was a commercial and critical success. Shabbir made an episodic special appearance in the anthology series Haqeeqat.

In 2020, Zainab appeared in a supporting role of Ayat in 7th Sky Entertainment's Mehar Posh that emerged as one of the highest rated Pakistani shows of 2020. She worked with acclaimed actors Ayeza Khan, Danish Taimoor, Ali Abbas, Sania Saeed and Rehan Sheikh during the series run.

== Television ==
Year	Title	Role	Notes	Ref(s)
2018	Maa Sadqay	Eshmal	Acting Debut	
2018	Sanwari	Ujala		
2019	Piya Naam Ka Diya	Aaliya		
2019	Emaan	Emaan		
2019	Malaal-e-Yaar	Minhal		
2020	Mehar Posh	Ayat	Negative Role	
2021	Yaar Na Bichray	Palwasha		
2021	Meray Apnay	Ramsha		
2022	Teri Rah Mein	Emaan		
2022	Mushkil	Hareem	Negative Role	
2023	Nikah	Anoosha		
2023	Fareb	Sonia		
2025	Ism-e-Yaraan	Minha		

=== Special appearances ===
Year	Title	Role	Notes	Ref(s)
2019	Haqeeqat	Faaria	Episode "Janwar"	
2020	Makafaat 2	Faryal	Episode "Mera Libas Ho Tum"	
2020	Dikhawa	Moomal	Episode "Numaiesh"	
2020	Lucky Kabootar	Niraali	Telefilm	
