= Faraz Farooqui =

Pakistani actor

- Born: 7 September 1989 (age 36); Karachi, Pakistan
- Education: University of Karachi
- Occupations: Actor; Model
- Years active: 2012 – present
- Spouse: Shiza Khan (m. 2016)
- Children: 2
- Relatives: Hammad Farooqui (twin-brother)

Faraz Farooqui is a Pakistani actor and model. He is known for his roles in the drama series Khalish, Dil-e-Bereham, Meri Ladli, Qismat Ka Likha, Ishq Hai, Bharosa Pyar Tera and Malaal-e-Yaar.

== Early life ==
Faraz took part in reality dance competition called Nachle that was judged by Faysal Quraishi, Reshma and Noor. Then his brother Hammad was selected but he didn't pass and then he worked as an educationist.

== Career ==
In 2012 he made his debut as an actor in the drama Meri Ladli. He appeared in dramas Mere Baba Ki Ounchi Haveli, Besharam, Malkin and Lamhay. Then he appeared in dramas Kabhi Band Kabhi Baja, Khalish, Qismat Ka Likha, Dil-e-Bereham and Malaal-e-Yaar. Since then he appeared in dramas Bharosa Pyar Tera, Sotan, Ishq Hai, Oye Motti Season 2, Dil-e-Veeran and Samjhota. In 2024, he had a brief role of a pehalwan in the sports-drama Akhara. The News International described his performance in the drama as a "decent job".

== Personal life ==
Faraz married Shiza Khan in 2016. The couple has a son and a daughter. His older twin brother Hammad is also an actor.

== Filmography ==
=== Television ===
Year	Title	Role	Network
2012	Meri Ladli	Gulsher	ARY Digital
2016	Mere Baba Ki Ounchi Haveli	Daniyal	ARY Zindagi
2016	Besharam	Mannan	ARY Digital
2017	Beti To Main Bhi Hoon	Shaizer	Urdu 1
2017	Malkin	Shahid	Geo Entertainment
2018	Lamhay	Jibran	A-Plus
2018	Kabhi Band Kabhi Baja	Arif	Express Entertainment
2018	Khalish	Bezaad	Geo Entertainment
2019	Qismat Ka Likha	Hadi	Express Entertainment
2019	Dil-e-Bereham	Sheheryar	A-Plus
2019	Malaal-e-Yaar	Faiq	Hum TV
2019	Bharosa Pyar Tera	Yasir	Geo Entertainment
2020	Sotan	Ammar	A-Plus
2021	Ishq Hai	Hammad	ARY Digital
2022	Beqadar	Junaid	Hum TV
2022	Oye Motti Season 2	Faraz	Express Entertainment
2022	Dil-e-Veeran	Wali	ARY Digital
2022	Dikhawa Season 3	Sajid	Geo Entertainment
2023	Sirat-e-Mustaqeem Season 3	Raza	ARY Digital
2023	Dikhawa Season 4	Hashir	Geo Entertainment
2023	Samjhota	Rohail	ARY Digital
2023	Behroop	Asim	Geo Entertainment
2023	Bandish 2	Arman	ARY Digital
2023	Mera Susraal	Nadeem Ahmed	Aan TV
2023	Mein Kahani Hun	Usman	Express Entertainment
2024	Akhara	Sultan	Green Entertainment
2024	Raaz	Hassan	Green Entertainment
2024	Dikhawa Season 5	Aamir	Geo Entertainment
2024	Meray Ranjhna	Hamza	Green Entertainement
2025	Muhabbat Kay Siwa	Hammad	Aan TV

=== Telefilms ===
Year	Title	Role
2019	Dilnaz Naseeb Wali	Cheema
2025	Begunah	Shiraz

=== Web series ===
Year	Title	Role	Network
2021	Just Married Season 1	Zain	Teeli Channel
2022	Just Married Season 2	Zain	Teeli Channel
2022	Fitness Ka Bukhar	Gym patient	Teeli Channel
