= Maryam Noor =

Pakistani actress

- مریم نور
- Born: Maryam Noor Sheikh; 24 February 1994 (age 32); Karachi, Pakistan
- Education: University of Karachi (LLB)
- Occupations: Actress; Model
- Years active: 2015–present

Maryam Noor (Urdu: مریم نور; born Maryam Noor Sheikh on 24 February 1994) is a Pakistani actor and model. She is known for her roles in dramas, Ab Dekh Khuda Kya Karta Hai, Silsilay, O Rangreza and Malaal-e-Yaar.

== Early life ==
Maryam was born in Karachi, Pakistan. She earned an LLB degree from University of Karachi.

== Career ==
She made her debut as an actress in 2015. She gained popularity in drama Ab Dekh Khuda Kya Karta Hai as Erum. In 2018 she played lead roles in Haiwan, Ro Raha Hai Dil and Mein Muhabbat Aur Tum. The same year, she also did modeling for various magazine, designers and companies. In 2019 she was a well known actress, she did lead role in Soya Mera Naseeb, Chand Ki Pariyan and Malaal-e-Yaar.

== Personal life ==
In 2022 she married Ismail Butt a pilot. She and her husband has son named Nael Ismail.

== Filmography ==
=== Television ===
Year	Title	Role	Network
2015	Ali Ki Ammi	Dua	Geo Entertainment
2015	S.H.E	Batool	Geo TV
2016	Bhai	Hira	A-Plus
2016	Koun Karta Hai Wafa	Sobia	A-Plus
2017	Fat Family	Hania	See TV
2017	O Rangreza	Aiman	Hum TV
2018	Maa Sadqey	Arooj	Hum TV
2018	Noor ul Ain	Sofiya	ARY Digital
2018	Silsilay	Roohi	Geo Entertainment
2018	De Ijazat	Nida	Hum TV
2018.	Mein Muhabbat Aur Tum	Fiza	Play TV
2018	Ro Raha Hai Dil	Laiba	TV One
2018	Ab Dekh Khuda Kya Karta Hai	Erum	Geo Entertainment
2018	Haiwan	Savera	ARY Digital
2019	Chand Ki Pariyan	Hina	ARY Digital
2019	Mazaaq Raat	Herself	Dunya TV
2019	Juda Na Hona	Maria	TV One
2019	Soya Mera Naseeb	Fari	Hum TV
2019	Malaal-e-Yaar	Amber	Hum TV
2020	Khoob Seerat	Nosheen	Geo Entertainment
2020	Kashf	Shumaila	Hum TV
2020	Kasa-e-Dil	Najia	Geo Entertainment
2020	Ghamandi	Sadia	Express Entertainment
2021	Charagar	Sanam	Aaj Entertainment
2021	Shehnai	Saima	ARY Digital
2021	Ishq Jalebi	Isha	Geo Entertainment
2021	Sirat-e-Mustaqeem	Nooreh	ARY Digital
2021	Banno	Ramsha	Geo TV
2021	Baddua	Neelum	ARY Digital
2022	Makafaat Season 4	Wareesha	Geo Entertainment
2022	Raqs-e-Tamanna	Noor Bano	SAB TV
2022	Hoor Pari Noor	Pari	Express Entertainment
2022	Meri Hai Kiya Khata	Tara	Aan TV
2022	Taqdeer	Zoni	ARY Digital
2022	Zindagi Aik Paheli	Kinza	Geo TV
2023	Oye Motti Season 2	Amber	Express Entertainment
2023	Aik Hath Mehndi	Faresha	A-Plus
2023	Choti Eid Py Qurbani	Noreen	SAB TV
2023	Dil Pe Zakham Khaye Hain	Sabahat	Hum TV
2023	Siyaah	Shaista	Green Entertainment
2024	Ishqaway	Aleena	Geo Entertainment
2024	Jaan Nisar	Farah	Geo TV

=== Telefilm ===
Year	Title	Role
2018	Jeena Hai Mushkil	Saba
2021	Pyaar Or Kirayedaar	Nida
2024	Badla	Kashaf
2024	Ijazat	Amber

=== Film ===
Year	Title	Role
2021	Kahaani	Neelum
