= Zain Afzal =

Pakistani actor (born 1990)

- Born: 23 January 1990 (age 36); Lahore, Pakistan
- Citizenship: Pakistan
- Education: Lahore Grammar School Beaconhouse National University, Lahore
- Years active: 2016–present
- Notable work: Sanwari

Zain Afzal (Urdu : زین افضل) is a Pakistani actor. He is mostly known for his comedy roles. He is best known for playing the role of "Taimoor" in Sanwari. He also acted in the film Ready Steady No. He is also known for Senti Aur Mental. In 2018, Zain was also invited on celebrity talk show Mazaaq Raat.

== Early life and education ==
Zain Afzal was born in Lahore, where he studied at Lahore Grammar School, and later at Beaconhouse National University.

== Career ==
Afzal started his career with the award-winning film "Zinda Bhaag" in which he played a small role. In 2015, he appeared in a Pakistani horror film "Maya" which was his first big commercial project. He was then chosen to act in Senti Aur Mental in which he got the leading roles instead of Yasir Hussain. He was also chosen to act in a comedy film "Ready Steady No" which was of Hum Films.

== Filmography ==
=== Film ===
Key
†	Denotes film / drama that has not released yet
†	Denotes films / drama that are currently on cinema / on air

Year	Title	Role	Notes	Ref
2013	Zinda Bhaag	Khota	Support Role	
2015	Maya	Sam	Support Role	
2020	Senti Aur Mental †	Mental	Lead Role	

=== Television ===
Year	Title	Role	Channel	Ref
2015	Maan		Hum TV	
2016	Zindagi Aur Kitne Zakham		TVOne Pakistan	
2016	Piya Be Dardi	Samad	A Plus TV	
2016	Jaan’nisar	Aftab	A Plus TV	
2016	Kon Karta Hai Wafa		A Plus TV	
2017	Meray Chotay Mian		Express Entertainment	
2017	Badnaam	Jawad	ARY Digital	
2018	Chakkar	Saad	BOL Entertainment	
2018	Sanwari	Taimoor	Hum TV	
2019	Resham Gali Ki Husna	Sharif	Hum TV	
2019	Ajnabi Lage Zindagi	Fahad	LTN Family	
2020	Dil Ruba		Hum TV	
2020	Qurbatein	Rafail	Hum TV	
2020	Ashkbaar		Play Entertainment	
2020	Fitrat	Bilal	Geo Entertainment	
2021	Chakress	Waqar	TVOne Pakistan	
2021	Bubbly TV	Dilbar Sethi	Sab TV	
2021	Phaans	Hashim	Hum TV	
2021	Wafa Baymol		Hum TV	
2022	Ibn-e-Hawwa		Hum TV	
2022	Socha Na Tha	Inspector Jamal	Aur Life HD	Episode: Chocolate cake
2022	Guddu	Muneeb	Geo Entertainment	
2022	Taqdeer	Nabeel	Ary Digital	

=== Webseries ===
Year	Title	Role	Notes	Ref
2020	Main Banjh Nahi Houn		Released on "Emax TV"	
TBA	Arpita	TBA	Released on "Deikho"	
