= Raeed Muhammad Alam =

Pakistani actor

- Born: 31 October 1988 (age 37); Karachi, Pakistan
- Education: Hamdard University (MBA)
- Occupations: Actor; Model; Director; Producer
- Years active: 2010 – present

Raeed Muhammad Alam is a Pakistani actor, model, director and producer.

He has appeared in several television serials, such as Jo Tu Chahey, Mujhay Jeenay Do, Dil Ruba and Fitrat.

== Early life ==
He completed his MBA in marketing from Hamdard University.

== Career ==
=== Modeling and acting ===
Raeed started his career from modeling in 2010.

He first acted in a commercial of Sony Ericsson directed by Saqib Malik. Many more commercials followed, including those for National Food, Jazz, Pepsi, Djuice, Sprite and Rani Pulpy.

Later he worked in several dramas including Badnaam, Kuch Na Kaho, Mujhay Jeenay Do, Jo Tu Chahey and Dil Ruba.

=== Direction and production ===
He worked as assistant with director Saqib Malik for seven years.

He also directed two music videos 'Teri Yaad' and one for Persian singer Shadi G.

In 2018 he started his own production house called DNA Films.

== Filmography ==
=== Television series ===
Year	Title	Role	Network	Notes
2010	Bahu Begum	Adil	ARY Zindagi	
2011	Rok Lo Aaj Ki Raat Ko	Shani	Express Entertainment	
2012	Kala Jadu	Zafar	ARY Digital	
2012	Sargoshi	Mehroz	Urdu 1	
2014	Marium Kaisay Jiye	Junaid	ARY Digital	
2014	Maa Sadqey	Kashi	Hum TV	
2014	Zameen Pe Chand	Saadan	Hum Sitaray	
2014	Hum Tehray Gunahgaar	Waqar	Hum TV	
2015	Rang Laaga	Haider	ARY Digital	
2015	Shukrana	Kamil	Express Entertainment	
2015	Bay Qasoor	Sunny	ARY Digital	
2016	Dil Haari	Jahanzeb	ARY Zindagi	
2016	Joru Ka Ghulam	Ghazali	Geo TV	
2016	Dosti Kay Side Effects	Haris	ARY Zindagi	
2016	Kuch Na Kaho	Maaz	Hum TV	
2016	Seeta Bagri	Taimoor Jaki	TV One	
2017	Badnaam	Mehroz	ARY Digital	
2017	Mujhay Jeenay Do	Shahab	Urdu 1	
2018	Kabhi Band Kabhi Baja	Shayaan	Express Entertainment	
2018	Tu Ishq Hai	Ahmer	Hum TV	
2019	Jo Tu Chahey	Burhan	Hum TV	
2019	Ishq Zahe Naseeb	Farhan	Hum TV	
2019	Band Khirkiyan	Sameer	Hum TV	
2020	Shehr-e-Malal	Kamran	Express Entertainment	
2020	Dil Ruba	Farhad	Hum TV	
2020	Chamak Damak	Faraz	Hum TV	
2020	Fitrat	Haris	Geo Entertainment	
2020	Tum Se Kehna Tha	Yasir	Hum TV	
2021	Makafaat Season 3	Shameer	Geo Entertainment	
2021	Dikhawa Season 2	Raheel	Geo Entertainment	
2021	Laapata	Geeti's imaginary boyfriend	Hum TV	
2021	Bebaak	Farhad	Hum TV	
2022	Makafaat Season 4	Usama	Geo Entertainment	
2022	Dikhawa Season 3	Sharjeel	Geo Entertainment	
2022	Chaudhry and Sons	Shahrukh	Geo Entertainment	
2022	Dil Awaiz	Kashan	Geo Entertainment	
2022	Inaam e Mohabbat	Shahzar	Geo Entertainment	
2022	Siyani	Kamran	Geo TV	
2022	Bepanah	Jibran	Hum TV	
2022	Zindagi Aik Paheli	Noman	Geo Entertainment	
2022	Farq	Jamshed	Geo Entertainment	
2023	Mann Aangan	Maheer	ARY Digital	
2023	Mein Kahani Hun	Zayan	Express Entertainment	
2023	Shehar Ki Raatien	Ahad	TV One	
2023	Maa Nahi Saas Hoon Main	Ammad	Geo Entertainment	
2023	Zulm	Omair	Hum TV	
2024	Kitni Girhain Baaki Hain	Sarmad	Hum TV	
2024	Dikhawa Season 5	Bilal	Geo Entertainment	
2024	Chand Nagar	Samar	BOL Entertainment	
2024	Tere Mere Sapnay	Ahsan	Geo Entertainment	
2024	Makafaat Season 6	Hassan	Geo Entertainment	

=== Telefilm ===
Year	Title	Role
2021	Daadi ka Daamad	Imaginary Boyfriend
2021	Tameez Uddin Ki Batameez Family	Jameel
2022	Ruposh	Rohail
2022	Mast Mohabbat	Jibran

=== Film ===
Year	Title	Role
2020	Tu Kyun Chala Gaya	Sameer
