= Gul-e-Rana (actress) =

Pakistani actress

- Born: 3 November 1965 (age 60); Karachi, Sindh, Pakistan
- Occupation: Actress
- Years active: 2000–present
- Children: Asim Azhar (son)

Gul-e-Rana is a Pakistani actress and politician, active in the television industry. She is the mother of musician Asim Azhar. She later joined politics and contested the 2018 general elections.

== Personal life ==
Rana was married but later divorced, from which she has a son Asim Azhar, a singer and actor.

== Career ==
Rana made her television debut in 2010 with Syed Mohammad Ahmed's Shaista Shaista, after which she appeared in a number of television serials. She is better known for her negative roles, such as Pyar Ke Sadqay, Aakhir Kab Tak and Pyar Deewangi Hai. In 2023, her performance of a blind woman in short Jin Mahal of anthology Teri Meri Kahaniyaan was praised by critics.

== Filmography ==
=== Films ===
Year	Title	Role	Notes
2023	Teri Meri Kahaniyaan	Razia Sultana	Short "Jin Mahal"

=== Television ===
Year	Title	Role	Notes
2011	Extras: The Mango People		
2011	Kis Din Mera Viyah Howay Ga	Sahibaan	
2012	Sasural Ke Rang Anokhay		
2014	Deemak		
2014	Malika-e-Aliya	Rahat	
2014	Rukhsati		
2015	Mohabbat Aag Si	Herself	
2015	Piya Mann Bhaye		
2015	Akeli	Faizan's mother	
2015	Rang Laaga	Laila's mother	
2015	Aap ki Kaneez		
2015	Agar Tum Saath Ho		
2016	Mannchali		
2016	Mere Humnawa		
2016	Sangdil		
2016	Kitni Girhain Baaki Hain 2	Fariya's mother	
2016	Bhabhi Sambhal Chaabi	Bhabhi Ji	
2017	Sanam	Shama Qureshi	
2017	Shadi Mubarak Ho		
2017	Aangan	Bilqees Kenchi; Billo	
2018	Khuwabzaadi		
2018	Aik Boond Zindagi		
2018	Zamani Manzil Kay Maskharay	Khooshnood Ara	
2018	Naulakha		
2018	Mera Ghar Aur Ghardari		
2018	Qaid	Aapa Bi	
2018	Kabhi Band Kabhi Baja		Ep# "Naiki Kar Doob Marr"
2018	Namak Paray		
2019	Enaaya	Enaaya's mother	
2019	Cheekh	Mannat's mother	
2019	Surkh Chandni	Jawad's mother	
2019	Barfi Laddu	Khala Khateera	
2019	Mirchiyan		
2019	Mere Mohsin	Safia	
2019	Choti Choti Batain	Guddu's mother	Story 4 "Kuch Toh Log Kahenge"
2019	Mera Dil Mera Dushman	Mairah's Mother	
2020	Pyar Ke Sadqay	Sarwar's mother	
2020	Dunk	Aapa Bi	
2020	Raqs e Bismil	Annah Jee	
2020	Mujhe Khuda Pe Yakeen Hai	Nazneen's Mother	
2021	Aakhir Kab Tak	Fareeda	
2022	Pyar Deewangi Hai	Naseem; Mateen's mother	
2022	Khala Garam Masala	Tauheed; Shazia's mother	
2022	Aik Thi Laila	Nuzhat Keenchi	
2023	Apney Hee Tou Hain	Naila	
