= Ali Abbas (actor) =

Pakistani actor

- Occupation: Actor
- Parents: Waseem Abbas (father); Saba Hameed (step mother) (mother)
- Relatives: Inayat Hussain Bhatti (paternal grandfather); Kaifee (paternal grand-uncle); Meesha Shafi (step-sister); Faris Shafi (step-brother); Aagha Ali (cousin); Ramsha Khan (cousin)

Ali Abbas (Urdu: علی عباس) is a Pakistani television actor. Born into a distinguished family deeply rooted in the Pakistani entertainment industry, he is the son of acclaimed actor and director Waseem Abbas, and the grandson of legendary singer, actor, and director Inayat Hussain Bhatti.

== Early life and education ==
His father is actor-director Waseem Abbas while his mother is actress Saba Hameed.

After graduating in law and working in a law office, Abbas changed careers to become a television producer before he moved into the family tradition of acting. He has also earned bachelor's in business administration, studied film and TV at the National College of Arts (NCA) and prepared for the Central Superior Services (CSS) exams on the insistence of his father.

His father strongly opposed his desire to become an actor, and he decided to work hard on it (losing a lot of weight for his characters), while trying to not capitalize on the family name.

== Television serials ==
| Year | Title | Role | Additional notes | Network |
|---|---|---|---|---|
| 2014 | Ladoon Mein Pali | Irfaan | | |
| 2014 | Woh Dobara | Umair | | |
| 2014 | Susraal Mera | Salman | | |
| 2015 | Aye Zindagi | | | |
| 2015 | Guriya Rani | Arish | | |
| 2015 | Dil Ishq | Hisham | | |
| 2016 | Main Kamli | Sikander | Aired on Aaj Entertainment | |
| 2016 | Kisay Chahoon | Aamir Jamaal | | |
| 2016 | Tum Milay | | | |
| 2016 | Tum Kon Piya | Zarbab Khan | | |
| 2016 | Meher Aur Meherban | | | |
| 2016 | Mann Mar Jaye Na | Sarmad Hamdani | | |
| 2017 | Titli | Ahmed | | |
| 2017 | Kitni Girhan Baqi Hain | Faisal | | |
| 2017 | Nazr-e-Bad | Aftab | | |
| 2017 | Khaali Haath | Baasil | | |
| 2017 | Shikwa Nahi Kissi Se | | | |
| 2017 | Laikin | Pervaiz | | |
| 2017 | Bubu Ki Beti | | Supporting role | |
| 2017 | Main Maa Nahi Banna Chahti | Jibran | Lead role | |
| 2017 | Ghar Titli Ka Par | Kamran | Supporting role | |
| 2018 | Mera Khuda Jane | Waleed | Lead role | |
| 2018 | Rubaru Tha Ishq | Wahaj | Lead role | |
| 2018 | Tum Se Hi Talluq Hai | Nakheel | Supporting role | |
| 2018 | Kabhi Band Kabhi Baja | | Episode "Tu Tu Ma Ma" | |
| 2018 | Siskiyaan | | Lead role | |
| 2018 | Noor Bibi | | Lead role | |
| 2019 | Naqab Zan | Aamir | Lead role | |
| 2019 | Rishtay Biktay Hai | Affan | Lead role | |
| 2019 | Kahin Deep Jaley | Faham | Lead role | |
| 2019 | Dard Rukta Nahi | | | |
| 2019 | Haqeeqat | Ateeq Ahmed | Episode "Mujrim Kaun" | |
| 2020 | Shehr-e-Malal | Shazir | | |
| 2020 | Deewangi | Haroon | | |
| 2020 | Mehar Posh | Naeem | | |
| 2020 | Tum Ho Wajah | Babar | | |
| 2020 | Fitrat | Shahbaz | Lead role | |
| 2020 | Ghisi Piti Mohabbat | Basharat | | |
| 2021 | Dour | Romaan | Lead role | |
| 2021 | Wafa Be Mol | Aazar | Lead role | |
| 2021 | Mere Apne | Omar | Lead role | |
| 2022 | Badzaat | Daniyal | | |
| 2022 | Guddu | Ebad | Lead role | |
| 2022 | Qalandar | Irfan | | |
| 2023 | Gumn | Kabir | Supporting role | |
| 2023 | Baylagaam | Afnan | Lead role | |
| 2024 | Aafat | Wahaj | Lead Role | GEO TV |
