= 2016 in Pakistani television =

The following is a list of events affecting Pakistani television in 2016. Events listed include television show debuts, and finales; channel launches, and closures; stations changing or adding their network affiliations; and information about changes of ownership of channels or stations.

== Television programs ==
=== Programs debuting in 2016 ===
Start date	Show	Channel	Source
9 January	Main Kaise Kahoon	Urdu 1	
13 January	Babul Ka Angna	Geo Network	
18 January	Lagao	Hum TV	
25 January	Mann Mayal	Hum TV	
25 January	Heer	Geo Network	
25 January	Mohay Piya Rang Laaga	ARY Digital	
25 January	Shehzada Saleem	ARY Digital	
28 January	Ab Kar Meri Rafugari	ARY Digital	
3 February	Kisay Chahoon	Hum TV	
4 February	Tum Yaad Aaye	ARY Digital	
8 February	Mera Yaar Miladay	ARY Digital	
11 February	Pakeezah	Hum TV	
17 February	Judai	ARY Digital	
17 February	Noor Jahan	Geo Network	
22 February	Zindagi Tujh Ko Jiya	Hum TV	
29 February	Sangdil	Geo Network	
5 March	Dil Lagi	ARY Digital	
12 March	Anabia	ARY Digital	
14 March	Khoat	ARY Digital	
15 March	Zara Yaad Kar	Hum TV	
23 March	Tum Kon Piya	Urdu 1	
30 March	Haya Ke Daaman Main	Hum TV	
9 April	Dil-e-Beqarar	Hum TV	
9 April	Nok Jhok	ARY Digital	
10 April	Udaari	Hum TV	
12 April	Wafa	Geo Entertainment	
13 April	Iss Khamoshi Ka Matlab	Geo Entertainment	
24 April	Mor Mahal	Geo Entertainment	
24 April	Shaam Dhaley	Geo Entertainment	
25 April	Mannchali	Geo Entertainment	
30 April	Kahan Tum Chalay Gye	Geo Entertainment	
3 May	Tum Meri Ho	ARY Digital	
10 May	Besharam	ARY Digital	
11 May	Deewana	Hum TV	
13 May	Jhoot	Hum TV	
17 May	Khwab Saraye	Hum TV	
3 June	Dharkan	Hum TV	
6 June	Maikay Ki Yaad Na Aaye	Geo Network	
11 June	Kathputli	Hum TV	
6 July	Meri Saheli Meri Bhabi	Geo Entertainment	
7 July	Iftar Mulaqat	Geo Kahani	
11 July	Be Aitbaar	Hum TV	
11 July	Izn-e-Rukhsat	Geo Network	
11 July	Bandhan	ARY Digital	
11 July	Saheliyaan	ARY Digital	
11 July	Naimat	ARY Digital	
11 July	Tum Milay	ARY Digital	
11 July	Mein Mehru Hoon	ARY Digital	
12 July	Aap Ke Liye	ARY Digital	
12 July	Dhaani	Geo Network	
13 July	Teri Chah Mein	ARY Digital	
13 July	Joru Ka Ghulam	Geo Entertainment	
14 July	Marzi	Geo Entertainment	
15 July	Noor-e-Zindagi	Geo Entertainment	
16 July	Thoda Sa Aasman	Geo Entertainment	
16 July	Yeh Chahatein Yeh Shiddatein	Geo Entertainment	
21 July	Ghayal	ARY Digital	
23 July	Laaj	Hum TV	
25 July	Rishta Anjana Sa	ARY Digital	
4 August	Bay Aib	Urdu 1	
5 August	Meher Aur Meherbaan	Urdu 1	
10 August	Saya-e-Dewar Bhi Nahi	Hum TV	
15 August	Mera Dard Bayzuban	Geo Network	
27 August	Dilli Walay Dularay Babu	ARY Digital	
1 September	Sang-e-Mar Mar	Hum TV	
12 September	Sanam	Hum TV	
17 September	Mere Humnawa	ARY Digital	
19 September	Bad Gumaan	Hum TV	
27 September	Choti Si Zindagi	Hum TV	
27 September	Hatheli	Hum TV	
29 September	Haasil	Geo TV	
2 October	Bin Roye		
14 October	Dil Banjaara	Hum TV	
18 October	Ahsas	Urdu 1	
18 October	Chahat Hui Tere Naam	Geo Network	
19 October	Khoobsurat	Urdu 1	
22 October	Khuda Mera Bhi Hai	ARY Digital	
22 October	Dukh Sukh	Urdu 1	
24 October	Roshni	Geo Network	
24 October	Manjdhaar	Geo Network	
28 October	Sila	Hum TV	
29 October	Khuda Aur Muhabbat (season 2)	Geo Network	
31 October	Kuch Na Kaho	Hum TV	
2 November	Shehrnaz	Urdu 1	
8 November	Moray Saiyaan	ARY Digital	
9 November	Waada	ARY Digital	
17 November	Bay Khudi	ARY Digital	
19 November	Mera Kya Qasoor Tha	Geo Network	
20 November	Mannat	Geo Network	
21 November	Ek Pal Ka Malaal	Urdu 1	
29 November	Bechari Mehrunnisa	Geo Network	
30 November	Yeh Ishq	ARY Digital	
3 December	Natak	Hum TV	
5 December	Gila	Hum TV	
6 December	Muqabil	ARY Digital	
22 December	Manchahi	Geo Network	

=== Programs ending in 2016 ===
End date	Show	Channel	First aired	Status	Source
5 May	Kisay Chahoon	Hum TV	2016	Ended	
16 May	Lagao	Hum TV	2016	Ended	
2 June	Zindagi Tujh Ko Jiya	Hum TV	2016	Ended	
3 August	Dil-e-Beqarar	Hum TV	2016	Ended	
6 August	Noor Jahan	Geo Entertainment	2016	Ended	
10 August	Wafa	Geo Entertainment	2016	Ended	
11 August	Tum Yaad Aaye	ARY Digital	2016	Ended	
20 August	Nok Jhok	ARY Digital	2016	Ended	
25 August	Pakeezah	Hum TV	2016	Ended	
3 September	Shaam Dhaley	Geo Entertainment	2016	Ended	
5 September	Mann Mayal	Hum TV	2016	Ended	
8 September	Shehzada Saleem	ARY Digital	2016	Ended	
10 September	Dil Lagi	ARY Digital	2016	Ended	
20 September	Zara Yaad Kar	Hum TV	2016	Ended	

==== Hum TV ====
- Aik Thi Misaal (12 January 2016)
- Tumhare Siwa (15 January 2016)
- Tere Baghair (28 January 2016)
- Sangat (4 February 2016)
- Mera Dard Na Janay Koi (18 February 2016)
- Preet Na Kariyo Koi (8 March 2016)
- Ishq-e-Benaam (29 March 2016)
- Gul-e-Rana (2 April 2016)
- Maana Ka Gharana (6 April 2016)
- Maan (6 May 2016)
- Sehra Main Safar (27 May 2016)
- Joru Ka Ghulam (29 May 2016)
- Tere Mere Beech (29 May 2016)
- Abro (4 June 2016)

==== ARY Digital ====
- Mere Ajnabi (20 January 2016)
- Aitraz (4 March 2016)
- Vasl-e-Yaar (7 March 2016)
- Batashay (2 April 2016)
- Naraaz (26 April 2016)
- Guzaarish (3 May 2016)
- Bay Qasoor (1 June 2016)
- Mohay Piya Rang Laaga (13 June 2016)
- Ab Kar Meri Rafugari (14 July 2016)
- Guriya Rani (21 July 2016)

==== Geo Entertainment ====
- Mujhe Kuch Kehna Hai (11 February 2016)
- Marzi
- Joru Ka Ghulam (2016 TV series)

== Channels ==
Launches:

- 6 June: City 41
- 1 December: BOL Network
