= Dil-e-Beqarar =

- دلِ بے قرار
- Genre: Family drama; Serial drama; Romantic drama
- Written by: Rukhsana Nigar
- Directed by: Owais Khan
- Starring: Junaid Khan; Hareem Farooq; Mansha Pasha
- Theme music composer: Adrian David Emmanuel
- Opening theme: "Dil-e-Beqarar"; Singers; Rizwan Anwer; Adrian David Emmanuel; Lyrics by Shakeel Sohail
- Country of origin: Pakistan
- Original language: Urdu
- No. of seasons: 1
- No. of episodes: 16

Production
- Cinematography: Azhar Ali
- Editor: Farhan Attique Khan
- Camera setup: Multi-camera setup
- Running time: 1 hour
- Production company: Gemstones

Original release
- Network: Hum TV, Hum Network Limited
- Release: 13 April – 3 August 2016

Related
- Maana Ka Gharana; Saya-e-Dewar Bhi Nahi; Maan; Pakeeza; Maana Ka Gharana; Zara Yaad Kar; Mann Mayal; Abro

Dil-e-Beqarar (Urdu: دلِ بے قرار; lit: The Restless Heart), is a Pakistani romantic television drama serial that was first aired on Hum TV on 13 April 2016, replacing Maana Ka Gharana. It aired every Wednesday at 7:00 pm PST. It stars Junaid Khan, Mansha Pasha, and Hareem Farooq.

== Plot ==
The story is about two brothers, Javed and Abbas (Qazi Wajid), who are fighting over money and, after one incident, cannot even bear to look at each other. Javed marries Aasiya, and Abbas marries Salma (Birjees Farooqui). Javed has a son, Sohail (Ahsan Balaj), and a daughter, Farida (Hareem Farooq). While, Abbas has a son, Mudasir (Junaid Khan). Both Farida and Mudasir fell in love, but their parents forbade them to marry because of their fight. Sohail marries Shehla. Aasiya and Javed decide to marry Farida with Naveed, Shehla's relative/cousin. Farida refuses a proposal, but they try. Abbas' hate for his brother has made him hate Farida and Sohail as well. They both court marriage each other. After 7 years of leap, Mudasir's parents die naturally, and Aasiya as well. Farida's father, Javed, survives but is ill and dies later in Farida's memories. Mudasir works in the job of Haji Sahab. Haji Sahab's daughter Sara (Mansha Pasha) was married to her fiancé Shehriyar, but was divorced due to Shehriyar's flud. She was then married to a cruel man, Jibran who divorced her later. Haji Sahab asked Mudasir to marry Sara which he agrees after asking Farida, and Farida agrees under the hope that they will get more money for her new house. He doesn't know that Sara was married to her fiancé. They (Shehriyar and Sara) meet in restaurant while Farida is with her and the kids, Sara acts as she doesn't know him in front of Farida. Farida asks same man how he know Sara later on, and tells him she's Sara's best friend and he tells her that he was Sara's first husband and lover and says he couldn't stay married with a woman who couldn't have children and secretly married to another lady and then Sara and Sheryar got divorced. Shehryar teases and often tries to meet up with Sara. He demands huge amounts of money in return for the promise of not exposing his relation with Sara in front of Mudassir. Mudassir suspects Sara and in the end reveals to Sara that he knew of Shehryar. Sara and Mudassir reconcile but Farida is left out.

== Cast ==
- Hareem Farooq as Farida Javed
- Junaid Khan as Mudasir Abbas
- Mansha Pasha as Sara Haji
- Jahanara Hai as Sajida
- Ahsan Balaj as Sohail Javed
- Marium Effendi as Shehla (young)
- Arjumand Hussain as Haji Sahab (Sara's father)
- Muhammad Hanif as Javed (Farida's father)
- Sabiha Hashmi as Nazara
- Birjees Farooqui as Salma Abbas (Mudasir's mother)
- Qazi Wajid as Abbas (Mudasir's father)
- Umar Sultan
- Shan

=== Child stars ===
- Hammad Khan as Sunny (Mudasir & Farida's son)
- Neha as Areesha (Mudasir & Farida's daughter)

== See also ==
- List of programs broadcast by Hum TV
- 2016 in Pakistani television
