= Nazr-e-Bad =

Pakistani television series

- Genre: Black magic; Romantic drama
- Written by: Imran Nazir
- Story by: Imran Nazir
- Directed by: Iqbal Hussain
- Starring: Azfar Rehman; Sarah Khan; Ali Abbas; Syed Villayat Hussain
- Opening theme: Singers; Raheel Fayyaz; Bina Khan; Lyrics by Saji Gul
- Country of origin: Pakistan
- Original language: Urdu
- No. of seasons: 1
- No. of episodes: 40

Production
- Producer: Moomal Shunaid
- Camera setup: Multi-camera setup
- Running time: 39:00
- Production company: Moomal Entertainment

Original release
- Network: Hum Network Limited
- Release: 25 January – 8 June 2017

Related
- Hatheli; Adhi Gawahi

Nazr-e-Bad (Urdu:نظرِبد; lit: Look of Evil) is a Pakistani black magic-based romantic television drama serial which aired on Hum TV on 25 January 2017, replacing the previously concluded drama Hatheli. It stars Azfar Rehman and Sarah Khan in leading to pivot roles.

The story is penned by Imran Nazir who previously written Mohabbat Aag Si which was strongly hit because of appearance of Azfar Rehman, Sarah Khan and Iffat Rahim and directed by Iqbal Hussain, who is famous for his previously directed drama Seeta Bagri and is produced by Moomal Shunaid under Moomal Entertainment.This serial was a great success and loved by the people because of its reality like most of the times these types of Black Magic are happening in our society.

== Story ==
Nazr-e-Bad is a drama about the old superstitious concept of Nazr-e-Bad (evil eye) and black magic. The story reveals how jealousy can lead to envy and eventually make people do horrendous things. Shafiq is a simple and common man, who lives with his family in a modest home. His brother lives in the same house upstairs. Nusrat (Shafiq’s wife and Maham’s mother, played by Fazila Qazi) despises Almas (Pervaiz’s mother, played by Sakina Samo) due to her modest background. Nusrat also believes that Almas casts an evil eye on her better economic condition. Maham (played by Sarah Khan) Shafiq’s daughter does not like her cousin Pervaiz, who deeply loves her. The story further unfolds, when Nusrat’s nephew Aftab (played by Ali Abbas) asks for Maham’s hand in marriage. This shakes Pervaiz and his mother Almas, as they wanted Maham to marry Pervaiz. In their jealousy and envy, they turn to black magic. What happens next is a series of horrendous and unfortunate events.

== Cast ==
=== Main cast ===
- Azfar Rehman as Pervaiz
- Sarah Khan as Maham
- Ali Abbas as Aftab

=== Recurring cast ===
- Sakina Samo as Almas
- Fazila Qazi as Nusrat
- Nayyar Ejaz as Baba
- Beenish Raja as Shazia
- Waseem Abbas as Shafiq ur Rehman
- Faseeh Sardar as Ahmer
- Humaira Bano as Salma
- Hanif Bachchan as Attique ur Rehman
- Mizna Waqas as Umera
- Aruba Mirza as Abeera
- Usman Patel as Babar
- Tara Mahmood as Shaista
- Jameel Ahmed as Akmal
- Noman Ashraf
- Iqbal Hussain as Shamsi Chacha
- Hajra Ali as Aneesa Yazdani
- Awais Waseer as Shafqat
- Villayat Hussain

== Availability ==
The show is available on:

- MX Player
- iflix (till 2017)

== Production ==
=== Post-Production delays ===
The viewers mostly liked the couple of Sarah Khan and Azfar Rehman in the set of Mohabbat Aag Si. The drama was scheduled to air in 2016 but due to Azfar Rehman had to work on Hatheli, Waseem Abbas and Fazila Qazi had to work for Deewana, Sakina Samo had to work for Dil Banjaara and Ali Abbas had to work for Tum Kon Piya the project was paused. The series was again scheduled to air from 15 December 2016 but due to post-production delays, the show aired from 25 January 2017.

== See also ==
- List of programs broadcast by Hum TV
- 2016 in Pakistani television
