= Tara Mahmood =

Pakistani actress and singer

- Born: 24 March 1974 (age 52)
- Occupations: Singer; actress
- Years active: 2006 – present
- Parent: Shafqat Mahmood
- Musical career
- Genres: Rock, Jazz, Funk, R & B
- Instrument: Vocals

Tara Mahmood is a Pakistani actress and singer. She rose to prominence by playing supporting roles in highly rated films, Seedlings (2012) and Good Morning Karachi (2013). Her performance in drama serials Muhabbat Subha Ka Sitara Hai (2014) and Diyar-e-Dil (2015) earned her widespread acclaim. Tara joined the band Rushk in 2014 after five years long hiatus, as its lead vocalist replacing Nazia Zuberi. She has played a role of Masooma in Hum TV's acclaim Ramzan series Suno Chanda and its sequel Suno Chanda 2. She, alongside her sister Beenish Mehmood are the daughters of veteran politician, Shafqat Mehmood, the former Federal Minister of Education and National Heritage.

== Filmography ==
=== Film ===
Year	Movie	Role	Notes	Ref
2013	Seedlings			
2013	Good Morning Karachi			

=== Television ===
Year	Title	Role	Notes
2006	Inspector Khoji	Tara	
2014	Muhabbat Subha Ka Sitara Hai	Nabeel's Sister in Law	
2014	Goya		
2014	Soteli		
2015	Jackson Heights		
2015	Diyar-e-Dil	Zuhra Tajamul	
2017	Nazr-e-Bad	Shaista	
2017	Laut Ke Chalay Aana	Aqeela	
2017–2018	Teri Raza	Rameez's mother	
2018	Suno Chanda	Masooma	
2018	Ek Chance Pyaar Ka	Naina's mother	Telefilm
2018	Seep	Fakhra	
2018	Romeo Weds Heer	Arshad	
2019	Anaa	Nazia	
2019	Juda Na Hona	Sudais Mother	
2019	Suno Chanda 2	Masooma	
2019–2020	Deewar-e-Shab	Shaama	
2020	Raaz-e-Ulfat	Munaza	
2020–2021	Bharaas	Sasha's mother in law	
2020–2021	Dunk	Mrs. Anjum	
2021	Chupke Chupke	Kaneez	
2021	Mujhay Vida Kar	Khalida	
2021	Amanat	Salma	
2021–2022	Dil-e-Momin	Seema	
2021–2022	Mere Humsafar	Sofia	
2022	Wabaal	Rahat	
2022	Wehem	Sabahat	
2023	Rang Badlay Zindagi	Qudsia	
2023	Fatima Feng	Seemi	
2025	My Dear Cinderella	Zareen Gul	

=== Web series ===
Year	Title	Role	Notes
2020	Churails	Shumaila	released on ZEE5
2021	Qatil Haseenaon Ke Naam	Dr. Naheed	released on ZEE5

== Discography ==
=== Singles ===
- "Mera Naam"
- "Tujhay Patta To Chalay"
- "Bori"
- "Aye Na"
