= Gul-e-Rana =

Gul-e-Rana may refer to:

- Gul-e-Rana (actress), Pakistani actress and politician
- Gul-e-Rana (TV series), Pakistani drama serial
