= Humaira Bano =

Pakistani actress

- Born: 17 December 1971 (age 54); Islamabad, Pakistan
- Education: University of Islamabad
- Occupation: Actress
- Years active: 2004 – present
- Children: 1

Humaira Bano is a Pakistani actress who mainly appears in television dramas. She is known for her roles in television series Mere Humdam, Deewangi, Ishq Zahe Naseeb and Jhoot.

== Early life ==
Humaira was born on 17 December 1971 in Islamabad, Pakistan. She completed her studies at the University of Islamabad.

She joined the industry in 2004. She was also noted for her roles in the dramas Aik Thi Rania, Bholi Bano, Jugnoo, and Aas. She is known for her work in the dramas Mere Humdam, Mehar Posh, Ishq Zahe Naseeb, and Phir Wohi Mohabbat.

== Personal life ==
Humaira is divorced and has one son.

== Filmography ==
=== Television ===
Year	Title	Role	Network
2013	Gohar-e-Nayab	Nighat	A-Plus
2013	Mohabat Subh Ka Sitara Hai	Sumaira	Hum TV
2014	Kahani Raima Aur Manahil Ki	Asiya	Hum TV
2014	De Ijazat Jo Tu	Faria	Hum TV
2015	Jugnoo	Jugnoo's mother	Hum TV
2015	Abro	Shahida	Hum TV
2015	Gul-e-Rana	Choti Phuppho	Hum TV
2015	Ishq-e-Benaam	Farah	Hum TV
2016	Jhoot	Amna	Hum TV
2016	Dekho Chaand Aaya	Shaheen	Geo Entertainment
2016	Hum Sab Ajeeb Se Hain	Rabi	Aaj Entertainment
2016	Bad Gumaan	Sania's mother	Hum TV
2016	Mera Kya Qasoor Tha	Sajida	Geo Entertainment
2016	Gila	Sarwat	Hum TV
2016	Izn-e-Rukhsat	Saira	Geo Entertainment
2016	Shehrnaz	Sherry's mother	Urdu 1
2016	Noor-e-Zindagi	Mehrunissa	Geo TV
2017	Dil Nawaz	Kiran's mother	A-Plus TV
2017	Nazr-e-Bad	Salma	Hum TV
2017	Phir Wohi Mohabbat	Alishba mother	Hum TV
2017	Bholi Bano	Zeenia's mother	Geo Entertainment
2017	Aik Thi Rania	Zarina	Geo Entertainment
2017	Ghar Titli Ka Par	Razia	Geo Entertainment
2018	Aik Mohabbat Kaafi Hai	Ushna's mother	BOL Entertainment
2018	Aye Dil Tu Bata	Aqsa's mother	Geo Entertainment
2018	Ki Jaana Main Kaun	Saira Ansari	Hum TV
2019	Mere Humdam	Usama's mother	Hum TV
2019	Dil-e-Gumshuda	Nadeem's mother	Geo TV
2019	Juda Na Hona	Samaha's mother	TV One
2019	Aas	Hania's mother	PTV
2019	Mera Rab Waris	Nadia's mother	Geo Entertainment
2019	Aas	Hania's mother	TV One
2019	Ishq Zahe Naseeb	Gohar's mother	Hum TV
2019	Haqeeqat	Inayat's wife	A Plus
2019	Makafaat	Mother	Geo TV
2019	Malaal-e-Yaar	Samreen Wajahat	Hum TV
2019	Dolly Darling	Dolly's friend mother	Geo Entertainment
2019	Deewangi	Haroon's mother	Geo TV
2020	Dikhawa	Nausheen	Geo TV
2020	Mehar Posh	Kaneez	Geo TV
2020	Umeed	Tamanna	Geo TV
2020	Tera Ghum Aur Hum	Shagufta	Hum TV
2020	Aulaad	Rakhshanda	ARY Digital
2021	Makafaat Season 3	Madiha	Geo Entertainment
2021	Rang Mahal	Shakeela	Geo TV
2021	Mere Apne	Naheed	ARY Digital
2021	Mohabbat Daagh Ki Soorat	Khalida	Geo TV
2021	Ishq Jalebi	Hassan's mother	Geo Entertainment
2021	Banno	Midhat	Geo TV
2021	Benaam	Haider's mother	ARY Digital
2022	Makafaat Season 4	Aiman's mother	Geo Entertainment
2022	Nisa	Kiran's mother	Geo Entertainment
2022	Sirat-e-Mustaqeem Season 2	Shagufta	ARY Digital
2022	Chaudhry and Sons	Zulekha	Geo Entertainment
2022	Guddu	Zehra	Geo Entertainment
2022	Bikhray Hain Hum	Rumaisa's mother	Hum TV
2022	Bepanah	Shehla	Hum TV
2022	Mere Damad	Saira	Hum TV
2022	Hook	Zayyan's mother	ARY Digital
2023	Dikhawa Season 4	Kulsoom	Geo Entertainment
2023	Mehar Mah	Ghazala Begum	Express Entertainment
2023	Jannat Se Aagay	Ms. Shamsi	Geo Entertainment
2023	Mera Afsar	Nasreen	PTV
2023	Mujhay Qabool Nahin	Saman	Geo TV
2023	Baylagaam	Salma	Geo Entertainment
2024	Dard Dilon Kai	Kulsoom	PTV
2024	Sirat-e-Mustaqeem Season 4	Mehroz's mother-in-law	ARY Digital
2024	Dikhawa Season 5	Shaheen	Geo Entertainment
2024	Mehroom	Nighat	Geo Entertainment
2024	Dil Ka Kya Karein	Zubaida	Geo Entertainment
2024	Jaan Nisar	Zunaira	Geo Entertainment
2024	Hum Dono	Hajra	Hum TV
2024	Mehshar	Najma	Geo Entertainment
2025	BOL Kahani	Shehnaz	BOL Network
2025	Kathputli	Zulaikha	Geo Entertainment
2025	Ishq Tum Se Hua	Bushra	Green Entertainment
2025	Baray Bhaiya	Sarwat	Geo Entertainment
2025	Pathar Dil	Arifa	Geo Entertainment
2026	Sara Aapi	Fareeda	Geo Entertainment
2026	Hadd	Seerat	Hum TV
2026	Milkiyat	Zakia	Geo TV

=== Telefilm ===
Year	Title	Role
2021	Principal Nadra 19 Grade	Shabnam's mother
2021	Daadi Ka Daamad	Zaviyar's mother
2021	Mera Ishrat Meri Marzi	Shagufta

=== Film ===
Year	Title	Role
2017	Rangreza	Gul-shah
