= Jhoot =

Pakistani television drama series

- Title screen
- Genre: Drama; Romance film
- Written by: Reema Ali Syed
- Directed by: Syed Ahmed Kamran
- Starring: Bushra Ansari; Mansha Pasha; Imran Ashraf; Kamran Jeelani; Mira Sethi
- Theme music composer: Raheel Fayyaz
- Opening theme: Raheel Fayyaz; Bina Khan
- Country of origin: Pakistan
- Original language: Urdu
- No. of seasons: 1
- No. of episodes: 21

Production
- Executive producer: Moomal Shunaid
- Producers: Moomal Entertainment & MD Productions
- Cinematography: Jawed Ansari
- Camera setup: Multi-camera setup
- Running time: 30–45 minutes

Original release
- Network: Hum TV
- Release: 13 May – 7 October 2016

Jhoot (Urdu: جھوٹ; Lie) is a 2016 Pakistani television drama series that was aired on Hum TV. It stars Bushra Ansari, Imran Ashraf, Kamran Jeelani, and Mansha Pasha. It aired every Friday at 8:00 pm, replacing Maan. It ended on 7 October 2016, preceded by Gypsy which was renamed as Dil Banjaara.

== Synopsis ==
The story is of Saleha and how a lie changes her entire identity and affects her life choices and her decisions for her family. She has a son, Waqar, and a daughter, Zara, while her husband lives abroad. Sadaf and Waqar like each other. After Saleha sees them together, she emotionally blackmails Waqar into getting engaged to her niece Farah. Saleha also breaks Farah's engagement and agrees to have Waqar marry Sadaf. Saleha places a condition that Sadaf's elder brother has to come and marry Zara. They refuse this condition, and Waqar and Sadaf are separated. Many years pass, and Zara and Waqar remain unmarried due to Saleha. One day Waqar reunites with the recently divorced Sadaf. They reconcile and marry.

Jamal and his family move into a rented house in the Defence area. Jamal and Zara marry. However, Saleha lies about Zara's age. The drama continues and shows the effects of Saleha's hypocrisy and lies on the family.

== Cast ==
- Bushra Ansari as Saleha
- Imran Ashraf as Jamal
- Kamran Jilani as Waqar
- Mansha Pasha as Zara
- Mira Sethi as Sadaf
- Akbar Islam as Junaid (Saleha's brother)
- Nargis Rasheed as Ghazala (Jamal's mother)
- Aisha Khan as Iqra (Jamal's sister)
- Sumaiyya Bukhsh as Maria
- Ramsha Akmal as Hira (Jamal's younger sister)
- Farhan Awan
- Sumera Hassan
- Akbar Khan
- Fareeha Sheikh
- Shaista Jaheen as Sadaf's mother
- Anwar Iqbal as Farooq
- Shahzad Malik
- Awais Waseer as Zaheer (Sadaf's brother)
- Fariha
- Rehana Kaleem as Zahida (Farooq's sister)
- Mariam Mirza as Safiyya (Saleha's sister)
- Arshad Ghori
- Faiza Gillani as Fouzia
- Kamal Khan
- Fouzia Mushtaq as Saleha's relative
- Humaira Bano as Amna (Farooq's sister)
- Sohail Masood
- Farah Zeba
- Heem Fatima
- Shazia Qaiser as Jamal's aunt
- Kiran Shahid
- Akhtar Ghazali
- Nighat Sultana
- Ash Khan
- Safiya Sohail

== Original soundtrack ==
Jhoot

Soundtrack album by Raheel Fayyaz & Bina Khan
- Released: 6 May 2016
- Recorded: April 2016
- Studio: Moomal Entertainment
- Genre: television soundtrack
- Length: 1:15
- Label: Moomal Entertainment
- Producer: Moomal Shunaid

The theme song of Jhoot is sung by Raheel Fayyaz and Bina Khan. It is produced by Moomal Shunaid under her banner Moomal Entertainment.

== See also ==
- List of programs broadcast by Hum TV
- 2016 in Pakistani television
