= Behkaway =

2025 Pakistani television series

- Genre: Family drama; Social drama
- Written by: Samra Bukhari
- Directed by: Asad Jabal
- Starring: Yasir Nawaz; Yashma Gill; Hiba Ali Khan
- Country of origin: Pakistan
- Original language: Urdu
- No. of episodes: 60

Production
- Producers: Abdullah Kadwani; Asad Qureshi
- Production company: 7th Sky Entertainment

Original release
- Network: Geo Entertainment
- Release: April 16 – June 13, 2025

Behkaway is a Pakistani television series written by Samra Bukhari and directed by Asad Jabal. Produced by Abdullah Kadwani and Asad Qureshi under 7th Sky Entertainment, the series stars Yasir Nawaz, Yashma Gill and Hiba Ali Khan in the lead roles. It premiered on Geo Entertainment on 16 April 2025.

== Plot ==
The story revolves around Zubair, a middle-aged man whose authoritarian attitude creates difficulties for his family. His wife, Zeenat, endures neglect and mistreatment from him as well as hostility from members of his household.

Zubair's encounter with Sitara, a younger woman, changes the course of his family life. His growing attraction towards her leads him to consider abandoning his existing marriage. His decisions create emotional consequences for Zeenat and other members of the family.

The series explores marital relationships, infidelity, family conflict and the effects of selfish decisions on domestic life.

== Cast ==
- Yasir Nawaz as Zubair
- Yashma Gill as Sitara
- Hiba Ali Khan as Zeenat
- Osama Tahir as Jahangir
- Nayyar Ejaz as Bhai Jee
- Farhan Ally Agha as Majid
- Ayesha Gul as Rasheeda
- Diya Rehman as Shahana
- Jinaan Hussain as Sidra
- Sajida Syed as Mahtab
- Maria Rizvi as Rida
- Hina Javed as Neelam
- Akbar Islam
- Kamran Jilani as Aslam
- Sami Khan as Shuja
- Khushi Maheen as Sana
