= Hatheli (TV series) =

Pakistani television series

- Title screen
- Also known as: ہتھیلی
- Genre: Family drama; Serial drama; Romantic drama
- Written by: Mustafa Hashmi; Mehwish Hassan
- Screenplay by: Mehwish Hassan
- Directed by: Mohsin Mirza
- Starring: Eshal Fayyaz; Azfar Rehman; Hassan Ahmed; Rubina Ashraf
- Theme music composer: Raheel Fayyaz
- Opening theme: Singers; Nabeel Shaukat Ali; Bina Khan; Lyrics by Wasi Shah
- Country of origin: Pakistan
- Original language: Urdu
- No. of seasons: 1
- No. of episodes: 30

Production
- Executive producer: Moomal Shunaid
- Producer: Moomal Shunaid
- Editor: Rao Shahbaz (Chief Editor is Muhammad Aamir Qureshi)
- Camera setup: Multi-camera setup
- Running time: 35 – 40 minutes
- Production company: Moomal Entertainment

Original release
- Network: Hum TV, Hum Network Limited
- Release: 27 September 2016 – 19 January 2017

Related
- Khwab Saraye; Nazr-e-Bad

Hatheli (Urdu: ہتھیلی; lit:Palm), is a Pakistani television drama serial that was first aired on 27 September 2016. It aired every Monday and Tuesday at 9:10, replacing Khwab Saraye. Eshal Fayyaz made her second appearance on Hum TV after Abro, opposite Azfar Rehman. After airing 8 episodes, the slot of Hatheli moved to Wednesday and Thursday at 9:10 pm, giving way to Kuch Na Kaho and replacing Deewana from 3 November 2016.

== Plot ==
Hatheli revolves around Zaib, a young girl who falls in love with Irfan and marries him, against the advice of her brother and sister-in-law. In a fit of anger, just a few days after their marriage, Irfan divorces Zaib when he finds out that she has attempted to find out about his past (his sister Mona had married a Christian and run away from home). Zaib marries Salman for Nikah halala in order to be able to marry Irfan again. Salman refuses to divorce Zaib. On the other hand, Samia, who likes Irfan, cunningly marries him. Samia becomes pregnant, and Irfan still refuses to accept her. The plot starts from here as it explores the characters' relationships and the consequences of their decisions.

== Cast ==
- Hassan Ahmed as Irfan (Salman's & Mona's Older Brother, Zaib's Husband and Naheed's Son)
- Eshal Fayyaz as Zaib (Nadeem's Younger Sister, Shabana's Sister In Law, Salman And Mona's Sister In Law and Irfan's Wife)
- Azfar Rehman as Salman (Mona & Irfan's Younger Brother, Zaib's Brother In Law & later husband and Naheed's Son)
- Rubina Ashraf as Naheed (Salman, Irfan and Mona's mother)
- Kiran Tabeir as Samia (Irfan's neighbour and wife)
- Hira Pervaiz as Mona (Salman And Irfan's Sister, Zaib's Sister In Law and Naheed's Daughter)
- Sajid Shah as Nadeem (Shabana's Husband, Zaib's Elder Brother and Irfan and Saleem's Brother In Law)
- Adnan Shah Tipu as Saleem (Shabana's Brother and Nadeem's Brother In Law)
- Fouzia Mushtaq as Saleem and Shabana's mother
- Ismat Iqbal as Samia's mother
- Aish Khan as Shabana (Saleem's Sister, Nadeem's Wife and Zaib's Sister In Law)
- Shahzad Malik
- Taifoor Khan as Kamran (Mona's Husband, Irfan and Salman's Brother In Law and Naheed's Son In Law)
- Azra Mohyeddin as Aapa (Samia's Aapa and tarot cards reader)

== Accolades ==
Year	Award	Category	Recipients	Result
2017	Lux Style Awards	Best Original Soundtrack	Nabeel Shaukat Ali	Nominated

== See also ==
- List of programs broadcast by Hum TV
- 2016 in Pakistani television
