= Imran Nazir (writer) =

Pakistani writer

- Born: Lahore, Pakistan
- Occupation: screenwriter
- Years active: 2004-present

Imran Nazir is a Pakistani writer best known for his works Rishtey and Mohabbat Aag Si that earned him widespread acclaim including Best TV Writer nomination at 15th Lux Style Awards. He is the head of content at Larachi Entertainment and a freelance writer at Geo Entertainment.

== Filmography (as a Writer) ==
=== Television ===
- Topi Drama
- Rishtey
- Mohabbat Aag Si
- Aas
- Sada Sukhi Raho
- Larka Karachi da, Kuri Lahore di
- Khot
- Nazr-e-Bad
- Jithani
- Pinjra
- Rasm-e-Duniya
- Thays
- Kashf
- Mehboob Aapke Qadmon Mein

Year	Title	Network	Ref(s)
2022	Wehem	Hum TV	
2022	Farq	Geo Entertainment	
2024	Girhein	Geo Entertainment	
2025	Muamma	Hum TV	

== Awards and nominations ==
- 2016: Lux Style Award for Best TV Writer - nominated.
