= Mansha Pasha =

Pakistani actress (born 1987)

- منشا پاشا
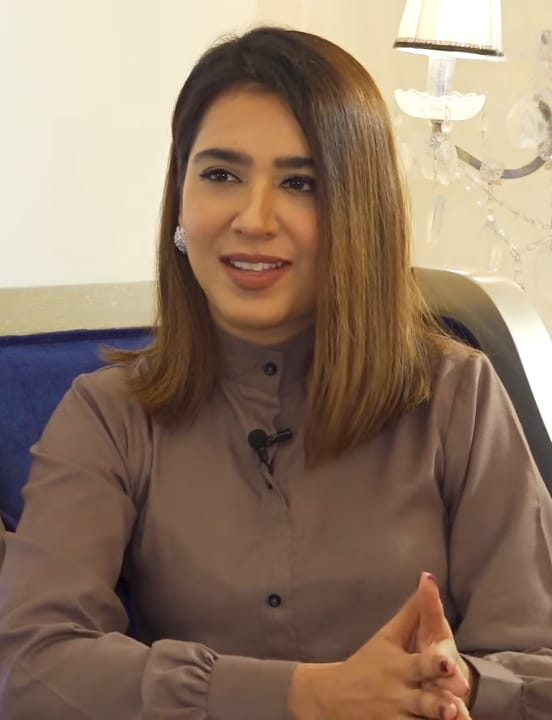
- Born: 19 October 1987 (age 38); Hyderabad, Sindh, Pakistan
- Occupation: Actress
- Years active: 2021–2024
- Spouses: Asad Farooqi (m. 2013; div. 2018) Mohammad Jibran Nasir (m. 2021)

Mansha Pasha (Urdu: منشا پاشا; born 19 October 1987) is a Pakistani actress and television presenter. She is known for her supporting roles in several critically and commercially successful television series, including Shehr-e-Zaat (2012), Madiha Maliha (2012), Zindagi Gulzar Hai (2013), Virasat (GEO) (2013) and Mera Naam Yusuf Hai (2015). She played Zoya in ARY Digital's comedy series Aangan (2017). Pasha made her debut in films with the romantic comedy Chalay Thay Saath (2017), and gained critical success with the crime thriller Laal Kabootar (2019) which earned her nomination for Best Actress at Pakistan International Screen Awards. She is also the recipient of the Hum Award.

== Personal life ==
Pasha was born in Hyderabad into a Sindhi family. She has three sisters, which are Zeenat Pasha, Hannah Pasha, and Maria Pasha. Pasha resides in Karachi with her family.

Pasha was married to businessman Asad Farooqi from 2013 to 2018. In 2021, she married politician and human rights activist Jibran Nasir.

== Career ==
Pasha's first acting appearance was a minor role in two episodes of the 2011 Hum TV's romantic series Humsafar where she played the role of Ayesha (Khirad's friend) and followed with another minor role in Shehr-e-Zaat as Rashna (Falak's friend) and as Nisha in Madiha Maliha.

She received praise for the supporting role of Sidra in the 2012 series Zindagi Gulzar Hai which was a commercial and critical hit and proved to be a breakthrough for her. She then starred in supporting roles in several acclaimed television series, including Virasat (2013), Ek Aur Ek Dhai (2013), Kitni Girhain Baaki Hain (2013), and Shareek-e-Hayat (2013). Her performance in the romantic series Mohabat Subh Ka Sitara Hai (2013) earned her Hum Award for Best Supporting Actress.

In 2014, Pasha played the leading role of Zara in Zara aur Mehrunnisa, Fiza in Shehr-e-Ajnabi, Sehrish in Hum Tehray Gunahgaar, Rumana in Lafangey Parindey and Aqsa in Mere Apne. In 2015, she first worked with Sadia Jabbar on the romantic series alongside Imran Abbas and Maya Ali. The serial received a positive response from critics, and performed well commercially. She then starred as Sanam in a family drama Bewafai Tumhare Naam and appeared as Nusrat in a romantic soap Daraar and as Samra in Tumhare Siwa.

Pasha starred in three television series in 2016. She first paired opposite Babar Ali in Babar Javed's Wafa. She then collaborated with Junaid Khan and Imran Ashraf in Dil-e-Beqarar and Jhoot respectively.

In 2017, she starred in the family drama Aangan, the romance Jalti Rait Per, the revenge drama Khudgarz and the romances Tau Dil Ka Kia Hua. The same year she also directed the Six-part series with Elaj Trust which tackles the topic of Post-partum depression.

In 2019, she starred in two television plays, Juda Na Hona and Surkh Chandni, where she played the antagonist for the first time.

She then starred in Mohabbat Tujhe Alvida alongside Zahid Ahmed and Sonya Hussyn in 2020.

She then appeared as the titular antagonist in Yasir Hussain's directed Koyal alongside Fahad Shaikh.

== Filmography ==
Year	Title	Role	Notes
2013	Ghoonghat	Sabeen	Telefilm
2014	Lafangey Parindey	Rumana	Telefilm
2015	Bakron Ki Robin Hood	Saleha	Telefilm
2015	Pani Da Bulbula	Maryam	Telefilm
2017	Chalay Thay Saath	Tania	
2018	Altered Skin	Mariam	
2019	Laal Kabootar	Aaliyah Malik	Nominated—Pakistan International Screen Awards for Best Actress
2020	Kahay Dil Jidhar		

=== Television ===
Year	Title	Role	Notes	Ref(s)
2011	Humsafar	Ayesha		
2012	Shehr-e-Zaat	Rashna		
2012	Madiha Maliha	Nisha		
2012–2013	Zindagi Gulzar Hai	Sidra		
2013	Virasat	Sajal		
2013	Shab-e-Arzoo Ka Alam	Rania		
2013	Kitni Girhain Baaki Hain		Episode "Bay Rehem"	
2013	Sharek-e-Hayat	Zarina	Episode: "Rishton Ki Buniyaad"	
2013	Ek Aur Ek Dhai	Reema		
2013–2014	Mohabat Subh Ka Sitara Hai	Aliya	Hum Award for Best Supporting Actress	
2014	Zara aur Mehrunnisa	Zara		
2014	Shehr-e-Ajnabi	Fiza		
2014	Hum Tehray Gunahgaar	Sehrish		
2014	Mere Apne	Aqsa		
2015	Mera Naam Yusuf Hai	Madiha		
2015	Wafa Na Ashna	Imsaal		
2015	Bewafai Tumhare Naam	Sanam		
2015	Daraar	Nusrat		
2015–2016	Tumhare Siwa	Samra		
2016	Wafa	Wafa		
2016	Dil-e-Beqarar	Sara		
2016	Jhoot	Zara Khan		
2017	Jalti Rait Par	Ayesha		
2017–2018	Toh Dil Ka Kia Hua	Dariya		
2017–2018	Aangan	Zoya		
2017–2018	Khudgarz	Abeer		
2019	Juda Na Hona	Samaha		
2019	Surkh Chandni	Shumaila		
2020	Haqeeqat	Kiran	Episode 12	
2020	Mohabbat Tujhe Alvida	Shafaq		
2021	Dikhawa			
2021	Koyal	Koyal		
2023	Adan	Adan		

=== Other appearances ===
Year	Title	Notes
2018	Mazaaq Raat	Guest appearance with Shujat Ali and Atif Chaudhry
2018	Mazaaq Raat	Guest appearance with Arman Ali Pasha
2018	Good Morning Pakistan	Guest appearance with Hajra Yamin and Faryal Mehmood
2018	Mazaaq Raat	Guest appearance with the cast of Chalay Thay Saath for promotion of the film
2019	Mazaaq Raat	Guest appearance with Laal Kabootar team for promotion of the film
2020	To Be Honest	Comedy show
2021	Good Morning Pakistan	Guest appearance with Sarah Khan

== Accolades ==
Ceremony	Category	Film	Result
18th Lux Style Awards	Best Film Actress	Laal Kabootar	Nominated
21st Lux Style Awards	Best Film Actress	Kahay Dil Jidhar	Nominated
