= Sakina Samo =

Pakistani actress, producer and director (born 1960)

- سڪینہ سمو
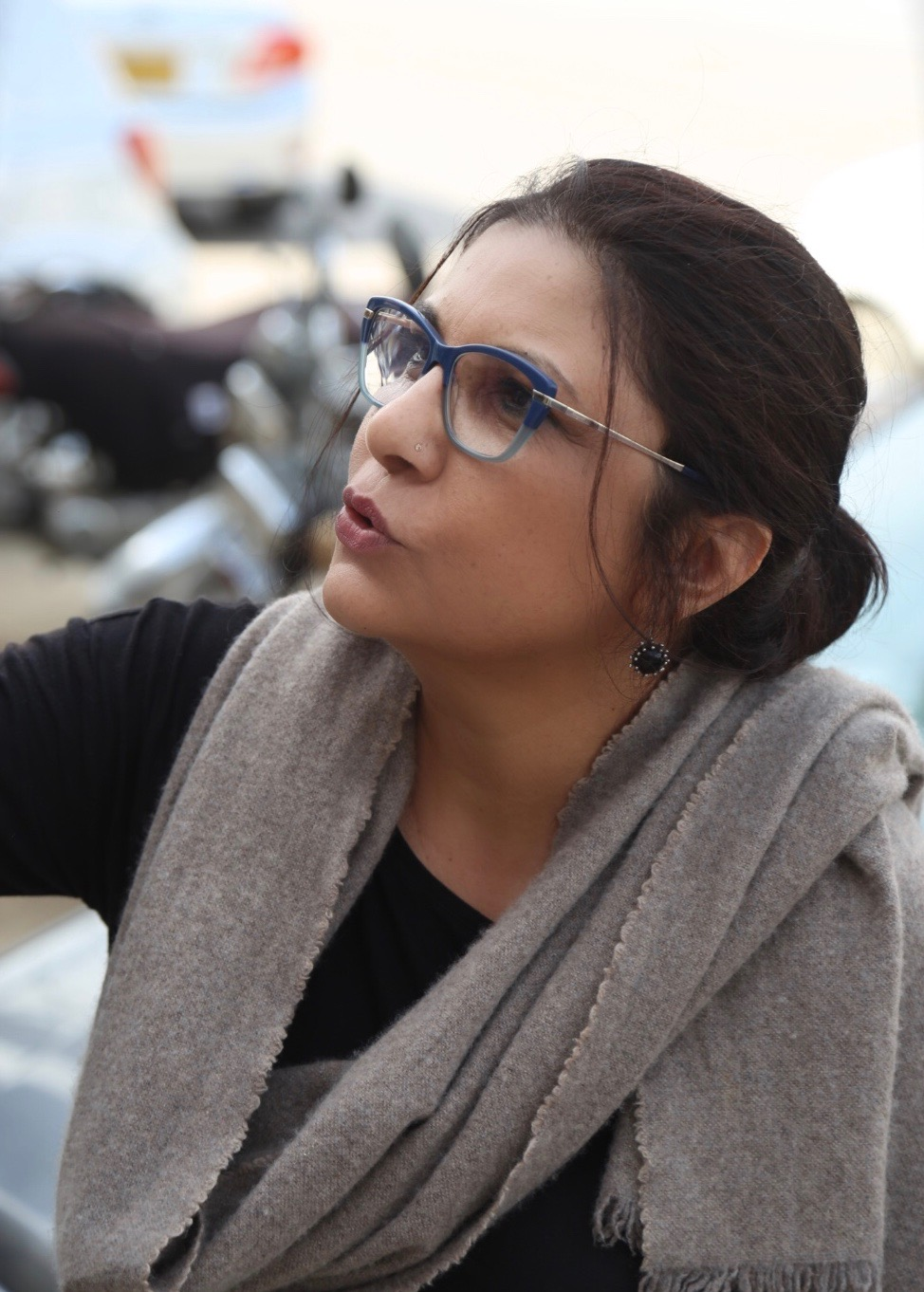
- Samo, on set during production of her first feature film
- Born: Sehwan Sharif, Sindh, Pakistan
- Occupations: Actress, Director
- Years active: 1982-present
- Website: sakinasamo.com

Sakina Samo (Sindhi: سڪینہ سمو) is a Pakistani actress, producer, and director.

== Career ==
Sakina Samo began her acting career in regional plays on Pakistan Television and dramas on Radio Pakistan. Her breakthrough screen performance in Deewarain, a social drama examining honor killings in Pakistani society, saw her receive the first of her best actress nominations. Sakina continued to deliver performances that amassed both critical and commercial acclaim. After an extended break, Sakina returned to the screen in 2000 to act, produce, and direct several award-winning dramas. In 2011, she received the Tamgha-e-Imtiaz in recognition of her work in the Pakistani entertainment industry. In 2014, she directed her fifth collaboration with Pakistani writer Umera Ahmad, Mohabat Subh Ka Sitara Hai which has received both critical and commercial acclaim. Most recently, she directed and produced her first feature film, Intezaar (English: Waiting), which was released countrywide in August 2022.

== Filmography ==
Year	Title	Role
1983	Dewarain	Actor
1985	Major Sarwar Shaheed	Actor
1986	Jungle	Actor
1987	Choti Si Duniya	Actor
1987	Pani Pay Likha Tha	Actor
1988	Khalish	Actor
1988	Wadi	Actor
1988	Ruby	Actor
1989	Hawa Ki Beti	Actor
1989	Kak Mahal	Actor
1990	Marvi	Actor
1990	Aandhi	Actor
2000	Aansoo	Actor
2001	Muhabbatein	Actor
2001	Aur Zindagi Badalti Hai	Actor
2003	Ishq Aatish	Director, producer, actor
2004	Wujood-e-Laraib	Director, producer, actor
2004	Lost Half (Maa Aur Mamta)	Actor
2006	Saouda	Actor
2008	Shazadi	Actor
2008	Amar Bail	Director
2010	Wafa Kaisi Kahan Ka Ishq	Actor
2010	Kaun Qamar Ara	Director
2010	Angoori	Actor
2011	Qurbat	Actor
2011	Zip - Bus Chup Raho	Actor
2011	Mera Naseeb	Actor
2012	Anjaam	Actor
2012	Sarey Mausam Apnay Hain	Actor
2013	Mahi Aye Ga	Actor
2013	Aseer Zadi	Actor
2013	Gohar-e-Nayab	Director
2014	Mohabat Subh Ka Sitara Hai	Director
2014	Main Na Manoo Haar	Actor
2015	Inthiha	Actor
2015	Aye Zindagi	Actor
2015	Tumhare Siwa	Director
2015	Ab Kar Meri Rafugari	Actor
2016	Dil Banjaara	Actor
2017	Nazr-e-Bad	Actor
2017	Ghari Do Ghari	Actor
2017	Dar Si Jaati Hai Sila	Actor
2020	Intezaar	Director, producer
2020	Log Kya Kahenge	Actor
2021	Dobaara	Actor
2022	Inaam e Mohabbat	Actor
2024	Dil Pe Dastak	Actor
2025	Qarz e Jaan	Actor

== Awards ==
Year	Result	Award	Category
2020	Won	Pride of Performance	Arts Category
2011	Won	Tamgha-e-Imtiaz	Services to Entertainment Industry
2005	Won	The 1st Indus Drama Awards	Best Director Serial and Best TV Serial Award
1990	Won	PTV Home Awards	Best Actress in Drama Category for 'Marvi'
1989	Nominated	PTV Home Awards	Best Actress in Drama Category for 'Kak Mahal'
1985	Nominated	PTV Home Awards	Best Actress in Drama Category for 'Major Sarwar Shaheed'
1985	Won	PTV Home Awards	Best Actress in Drama Category for 'Jungle'
1984	Nominated	PTV Home Awards	Best Actress in Drama Category for 'Dewarain'
