= Ab Kar Meri Rafugari =

Pakistani television series

- Genre: Family drama Serial drama Romance
- Based on: Ab Kar Meri Rafugari by Saira Raza
- Written by: Saira Raza
- Directed by: Adnan Wai Qureshi
- Starring: Ushna Shah; Daniyal Raheel; Usmaan Peerzada; Nida Mumtaz; Mariam Ansari
- Theme music composer: Hassan Hayat Khan
- Opening theme: "Ab Kar Meri Rafugari"
- Composer: Hassan Hayat Khan
- Country of origin: Pakistan
- Original language: Urdu
- No. of episodes: 24

Production
- Production locations: Karachi, Sindh
- Editor: Faisal Baig
- Camera setup: Multi-camera
- Running time: 40 minutes

Original release
- Network: ARY Digital
- Release: 28 January – 14 July 2016

Ab Kar Meri Rafugari (Urdu: اب کر میری رفو گری English: Now Mend Me) is a Pakistani drama which aired every Thursday at 8:00 PM EST on ARY Digital from 28 January 2016 till 14 July 2016. It was directed by Adnan Wai Qureshi and was based on a novel of the same name written by Saira Raza. Ushna Shah and Daniyal Raheel portrayed the main leads, Taban and Jazib, respectively. The story focuses on the stigma that ensues a conservative family's honor when their daughter's chastity is challenged.

== Plot ==
The show follows the families of the three Taj brothers. The eldest, who has died, is survived by his wife, Ayesha, and daughter, Maida. The second oldest brother, Mujahid, his wife, Zahida, daughters Taban and Zooshishan ("Zoofi"), and young son Kashan live next door to the youngest brother, Sajid's family, which includes his wife, Samina, son, Shakeel, and daughter, Sonia.

The Taj family is extremely conservative and refuses to marry their daughters out of their bloodline. Due to this, Ayesha worries that she will continue to be unsuccessful in finding a groom for Maida, who is continuing to age. Meanwhile, Taban, along with Zoofi and Maida, attains permission from her father to attend a friend's wedding. In preparation, she visits a flower shop, where she is noticed by Jazib Sultan, who falls in love with her beauty and charming personality. Ayesha contacts a marriage bureau agent to find a match for her daughter, and after much hesitation, supplies photos of Maida as well. The agent happens to visit Jazib's house to ask if they are interested; a photo of Taban was also accidentally supplied and seeing it, Jazib insists that his parents, Rabia and Haider, send a proposal for his marriage. During their visit at the Taj house, Mujahid is angered upon learning that they do not belong to their bloodline, and politely declines their proposal. Jazib, infatuated with Taban, stalks her at her college and wanders near her house, despite Haider's warnings. Taban is oblivious of both his obsession and the decline of his proposal, but soon becomes aware that she has a secret admirer when Jazib begins to deliver love letters. Meanwhile, Shakeel lusts for Taban, who is disgusted by his behavior and rejects his advances.

Mujahid becomes increasingly suspicious of Taban, who is innocent, when he notices Jazib's obsession with her. He warns him to stay away from his daughter, but when he refuses to listen, he violently injures him with the help of Sajid and Shakeel. In the meantime, Ayesha manages to secure a well-suited groom for Maida and they are engaged. Rabia and Haider are disappointed in their son and ask him to stop associating with the Taj family, to which he grudgingly agrees. Mujahid is under the impression that Taban has acknowledged Jazib's love for her and fearing that she would elope with him, he arranges her marriage with Shakeel against her will. Taban begs her father to wed her with any man except Shakeel, as she is highly aware of Shakeel's unstable and revolting character. Left with no choice, she quietly leaves the house and plans to commit suicide to escape the marriage. Jazib, who is standing outside for one final time, reminiscing his love for her, stops her and introduces himself. When she says she cannot go back, as her father will either kill her or marry her off to Shakeel, Jazib takes her to his house, much to the chagrin of his parents. Haider initially insists that Taban return to her house at any cost but out of sympathy, he agrees to help her. He states that their only option is for Taban and Jazib to marry; Taban agrees after much contemplation and breaks down after the marriage, knowing that she will be loathed by her family.

When the Taj family discovers that Taban has married Jazib, they assume that she did this purposefully and has betrayed their trust. Shakeel promises to avenge this act of defiance, while Mujahid is distraught and becomes paranoid. Taban becomes emotionally detached, although Jazib and his family treat her with love and care. Soon, Haider leaves for work in Dubai, where he meets with an accident and slips into a comatose state. Rabia leaves to take care of him, while Jazib attempts to convince Taban of his love for her. Just as Taban realizes that she has also begun to care for Jazib, Haider is pronounced to be in critical condition, and Jazib leaves for Dubai, promising that he will return soon. Shakeel takes advantage of this situation and kidnaps Taban, bringing her back to her family. Mujahid refuses to listen to her and abuses her, locking her in a room, in spite of her mother's plea. Haider passes away, and Jazib returns to Karachi with Rabia, bent on locating Taban. She secretly phones him and pleads for him to rescue her before Mujahid locks her up again. Shakeel attempts to rape her but she informs her family, who does not believe her.

Jazib presses charges against the Taj family for kidnapping his wife. In the court, when Taban is asked who she would like to be in the custody of, she chooses her husband, leaving her family shocked. Mujahid suffers from a heart attack and Shakeel is arrested when he tries to shoot Jazib; the case is covered by the media. In his paranoia, Mujahid refuses to leave the house and believes he has been disgraced. He forbids Zoofi, who is a passionate student and wishes to become a doctor, from studying further. Maida's engagement is broken as her fiancé refuses to associate with the Taj family, and in her desperation, Ayesha marries Maida with Riaz, a much older widowed father. Mujahid has Zoofi forcibly marry Shakeel, who taunts and abuses her. When Shakeel admits to misbehaving with Taban, Zahida overhears. She tearfully tells Mujahid that their daughters do not lie, but he brushes her off. She passes away in prayer. In the meantime, Taban adjusts to her life with Jazib and learns that she is pregnant, unaware of the troubles her family members are going through. When Shakeel learns that Zoofi is pregnant, he tells her he will only be satisfied with a son. As Taban discovers that her mother has died, she is devastated and visits her grave, where she encounters her brother Kashan. He blames her for their troubles, causing her to request a meeting with Zoofi, who narrates their family's dilemmas, including her forced marriage to Shakeel. Taban is enraged upon hearing this and alongside Zoofi, confronts Mujahid, who stands speechless against their anger. On her way home, Zoofi finds Shakeel waiting for her with accusations and he abuses her when she stands up to him, causing her to miscarry. Mujahid realizes his mistake and has Zoofi divorce Shakeel, bringing her back home and allowing her to resume studying. He also reconciles with Taban and Jazib and holds a family reunion. In the meantime, Maida is satisfied after being accepted by Riaz's children, and develops a happy relationship with Riaz himself.

== Cast ==
- Ushna Shah as Taban Sultan (née Mujahid)
- Daniyal Raheel as Jazib Sultan
- Usmaan Peerzada as Mujahid Taj
- Mariam Ansari as Zoofishan "Zoofi" Mujahid
- Nida Mumtaz as Zahida Mujahid
- Sakina Samo as Samina Sajid
- Hashim Butt as Sajid Taj
- Ali Safina as Shakeel Sajid
- Shakeel as Haider Sultan
- Shamim Hilaly as Rabia Sultan
- Humaira Zaheer as Ayesha Taj
- Mira Sethi as Maida Riaz
- Rashid Farooqui

== Critical reception ==
The show has been compared to Jane Austen's Pride and Prejudice and has garnered acclaim for its stellar cast and natural dialogues. Jerjees Seja, CEO of ARY Digital Network, shared his views on the serial and said, "With the constant effort of our team and our viewers love and support we bring to you our new venture Ab Kar Meri Rafugari which is about love, obsession, and trust and we promise to bring more and more exciting shows for you on ARY Digital."
