= Juda Na Hona =

2019 Pakistani television series

- Genre: Romantic drama; Serial drama
- Written by: Seema Munaf
- Directed by: Owais Khan
- Starring: Shehroz Sabzwari; Mansha Pasha; Alyy Khan; Firdous Jamal; Tara Mahmood
- Country of origin: Pakistan
- Original language: Urdu
- No. of seasons: 1
- No. of episodes: 26

Production
- Producers: Musharaf Jaffery; Naveed Arshad
- Production location: Pakistan
- Running time: Approx 40 minutes

Original release
- Release: 25 February – 26 August 2019

Juda Na Hona (previously titled Parwarish) is a 2019 Pakistani television series. It features Shehroz Sabzwari, Mansha Pasha, Alyy Khan, Firdous Jamal, Humaira Bano, Maryam Noor, Sonia Nazir, and Tara Mahmood in pivotal roles. The serial began on TV One from 25 February 2019, and aired on Mondays.

== Plot ==
Samaha (Mansha Pasha) is the daughter of a very poor family and Sudais (Shehroz Sabzwari) is the son of a very rich family. Both meet by chance and fall in love.

== Cast ==
- Shehroz Sabzwari as Sudais
- Mansha Pasha as Samaha
- Alyy Khan as Sudais Father
- Firdous Jamal as Samaha's Father
- Humaira Bano as Samaha's Mother
- Maryam Noor as Maria
- Sonia Nazir as Sajal
- Tara Mahmood as Sudais Mother
