= Gohar-e-Nayab =

Pakistani television series

- Also known as: Gauhar
- Genre: Romance; Drama
- Written by: Samra Bukhari
- Directed by: Sakina Samo
- Starring: Sajal Ali; Ahsan Khan; Sarah Khan
- Opening theme: Meri Neendo Ko Par Lag Jaye Sung by K.S Chithra
- Composer: Owais Masood
- Country of origin: Pakistan
- Original language: Urdu
- No. of episodes: 22

Production
- Producers: Abdullah Kadwani; Asad Qureshi
- Camera setup: Multi-camera
- Running time: Approx. 40-45 minutes
- Production company: 7th Sky Entertainment

Original release
- Network: A-Plus Entertainment
- Release: 21 June – 6 December 2013

Gohar-e-Nayab (Urdu: گوہرِ نایاب, transl. A rare gem) is a 2013 Pakistani drama television series directed by Sakina Samo, and stars Sajal Aly as the titular role of Gohar, an orphan college student whose indomitable spirit remains unbroken despite the mistreatment she faces in her maternal home. Written by Samra Bukhari, and produced by Abdullah Kadwani and Asad Qureshi under 7th Sky Entertainment, the series was broadcast on A-Plus Entertainment in 2013.

It marked Aly's third on-screen with Ahsan Khan after Meray Qatil Meray Dildar and Meri Ladli.

== Plot ==
The story revolves around Gohar-e-Nayab, a motherless girl living with her uncle Wahab's family, where she's treated poorly. Despite this, Gori is a carefree and outspoken girl who doesn't let her circumstances define her. In her uncle's house, only her uncle and grandmother care for her. Her aunt Azra and cousin Soniya suspect she's after Wahab's son Kamran, hoping to marry him and become the owner of the house. However, Kamran wants to go abroad for better professional opportunities, but his father refuses, doubting his capabilities. Gori secretly helps him to send him abroad by selling her mother's jewelry. Kamran starts acting ungratefully and does not contact her after settling abroad and returns shortly after, leading to his marriage being fixed with his cousin Rumi.

When Soniya and Rumi start treating Gori badly after the marriage, she shifts to her father's house. There, a relative of them, Fakhra spots her and selects her as the future wife for his son Sami, his cousin. The marriage, however, is actually a plot for revenge by Fakhra due to Gori's father's past actions against Sami's family.

== Cast ==
- Sajal Aly as Gohar "Gori"
- Ahsan Khan as Sami
- Zaheen Tahira as Gohar's grandmother
- Mohsin Gilani as Wahab
- Azra Mohyeddin as Azra
- Asma Abbas as Fakhra
- Madiha Rizvi as Rumi
- Shameen Khan as Taniya
- Esha Noor as Sonia
- Taqi Ahmed as Kamran
- Sarah Khan as Sara
- Ayesha Gul as Rashida
- Rashid Farooqui as Iqbal
- Afshan Qureshi as Saleha
- Humaira Bano as Nighat
- Umer Naru as Haseeb
- Imran Ashraf as Sohail

== International broadcast ==
In India, the show was broadcast on Zindagi from 17 December 2014 to 10 January 2015, under the title Gauhar. In United Kingdom, the show was premiered on Zee TV UK in March 2014.

== Accolades ==
=== Nominations ===
- 4th Pakistan Media Awards - Best Drama Writer - Samra Bukhari
- 4th Pakistan Media Awards - Best Drama Actress - Sajal Aly
