= Muamma (TV series) =

- Written by: Imran Nazir
- Directed by: Shaqielle Khan
- Starring: Saba Qamar; Usman Mukhtar; Ali Ansari; Shehzad Sheikh; Syed Jibran
- Country of origin: Pakistan
- Original language: Urdu
- No. of episodes: 35

Production
- Production company: Momina Duraid Productions

Original release
- Network: Hum TV
- Release: 26 December 2025 – 23 April 2026

Muamma (Urdu: معما, transl. Enigma or Mystery) is a Pakistani psychological thriller television series that premiered on Hum TV in December 2025. Produced by Momina Duraid Productions, the series is directed by Shaqielle Khan and written by Imran Nazir. It stars Saba Qamar in the lead role of a seductress housewife, alongside Usman Mukhtar, Shahzad Sheikh, Ali Ansari, Maria Wasti, and Anoushay Abbasi.

== Premise ==
Jahan Ara lives there with her maid Asiya and rents out rooms to several tenants. Her tenants are Zeeshan and Zara. She uses hidden passages and two-way mirrors built into the house to spy on her tenants and manipulate their relationships. She actively interferes in their lives, exploiting their personal struggles and secrets to control them. The situation escalates when her ex-husband, Sarmad, returns to her life from jail, sparking a direct conflict with her. As her secret surveillance and manipulation are exposed, her relationships with the tenants collapse into chaos.

== Cast ==
- Saba Qamar as Jahan Ara "Jijji"
- Nimra Shahid as Asiya
- Usman Mukhtar
- Shahzad Sheikh as Shah Jahan
- Ali Ansari as Junaid
- Anoushay Abbasi as Myra
- Sidra Niazi as Ayeza
- Nabeel Zuberi as Zeeshan
- Mahnoor Malik Zara
- Hassan Fareed as Aashiq
- Syed Jibran as Sarmad
- Hina Rizvi
- Maria Wasti as Zulaikha
- Anjum Habibi
- Ahin Babar
- Asma Abbas
- Syed Mohammad Ahmed

== Production ==
Muamma was produced by Momina Duraid Productions, and developed by Faysal Manzoor Khan for HUM TV. The series was written by Imran Nazir and directed by Shaqielle Khan. The protagonist role was written for Saba Qamar, and she agreed for the part, her third television portrayal in the year, after Case No. 9 and Pamaal. The principal photography ended in April 2026.

The first teaser was released in November 2025.

During a meet and greet session in London, UK, Qamar confirmed that season 2 of the series is in production and her character is alive.

== Broadcast ==
Muamma premiered in November 2026 on Hum TV, airing two weekly episodes, however in mid-March 2026, the series began to air a weekly episode.

== Reception ==
Sana Hussain of The News International was appreciative of Muamma for its ambition, originality, and strong acting performances including Qamar, Ansari Abbasi, Shahid and Sheikh, but criticised it for its inconsistent writing, repetitive storytelling, unresolved plotlines, and underdeveloped character arcs, concluding that the promising concept was weakened by poor execution. In a more positive review, Sarwat N. Shah of Dawn praised the series for its powerful psychological storytelling, highlighting its exploration of unresolved trauma through the Karpman Drama Triangle, and the possibility of healing appreciating how it thoughtfully explores trauma, destructive behaviour, and the possibility of healing through self-awareness rather than revenge.
