= Mohabbat Tujhe Alvida =

Pakistani television series

- Genre: Drama; Romance
- Written by: Abdul Khaliq Khan
- Directed by: Barkat Siddiqui
- Starring: Zahid Ahmed; Sonya Hussain; Mansha Pasha
- Opening theme: "Ja Mohabbat Tujhe Alvida" by Sahir Ali Bagga & Afshan Fawad
- Country of origin: Pakistan
- Original language: Urdu
- No. of episodes: 31

Production
- Running time: Approx. 37-40 minutes

Original release
- Network: Hum TV
- Release: 17 June 2020 – 13 January 2021

Mohabbat Tujhe Alvida (Urdu: محبّت تجھے الوداع, lit. 'Farewell To You Love') is a Pakistani melodrama television series produced by Barkat Siddiqui and Zayed Sheikh. It stars Zahid Ahmed, Sonya Hussain, and Mansha Pasha in lead roles. The show is loosely based on the folk tale of Lila Chanesar.

== Summary ==
Ulfat (Sonya Hussyn) belongs to a lower middle-class family and dreams of becoming rich. She meets Shafaq (Mansha Pasha) who is a rich businesswoman and, in order for Ulfat to succeed in her dreams, she chooses to risk her marital life, causing many problems for her.

== Cast ==
- Zahid Ahmed Shahaan
- Sonya Hussyn as Ulfat
- Mansha Pasha as Shafaq
- Jawed Sheikh as Wajahat, Shafaq's father
- Sajida Syed as Farzana, Shahaan's mother
- Mizna Waqas as Noori
- Hassam Khan as Mansoor
- Angeline Malik as Mrs Ikhlaaq
- Anosha Ali as Bano
- Muzaina Malik

== Production ==
In November 2018, it was revealed that Barkat Siddiqui is working on a project called Aye Dil Zara Sambhal. The title of the show was changed to Jaan-e-Mann and later to Mohabbat Tujhe Alvida. In March 2019, Sonya Hussyn revealed that she would play one of the lead in the series alongside Zahid Ahmed and Armeena Khan. Ahmed was selected to portray Shahaan, an average middle-class man who is working hard to create comfort in the lives of his wife Ulfat (played by Hussyn) and children. Mansha Pasha played the character of Shafaq, a rich and glamorous girl. The role was initially offered to Khan but for unknown reasons, probably date clashes, she was replaced by Pasha. It was Pasha and Ahmed's second on-screen appearance together after Tau Dil Ka Kiya Hua while Ahmed collaborated with Hussyn second time after Ishq Zahe Naseeb.

=== Criticism ===
After the release of the first and second teaser, the show was heavily criticised for its typical melodramatic story. The viewers also called it a copy of the Indian film Judaai to which Pasha responded that "the show may be inspired but we have our own folktales", and hinted the show was based on Lilan Chanesar by showing the details of the article.

== Soundtrack ==
Mohabbat Tujhe Alvida OST

Soundtrack album by Sahir Ali Bagga and Afshan Fawad
- Released: 12 June 2020
- Recorded: 2020
- Genre: Television soundtrack
- Length: 1:12
- Language: Urdu
- Label: Hum TV
- Producer: Barkat Sidiki

Music video
- "Mohabbat Tujhe Alvida" OST on YouTube

The title song of Mohabbat Tujhe Alvida was composed and performed by musician Sahir Ali Bagga with Afshan Fawad being in the chorus. Lyrics for the song were given by Imran Raza. It marked Bagga's return to Hum TV, since he performed the channel's Deewar-e-Shab's title song "Kya Hai Ishq" in 2019. The first half of the soundtrack was released on 12 June and the complete OST released on 17 June 2020.
