= Mira Sethi =

Pakistani actress and writer (born 1987)

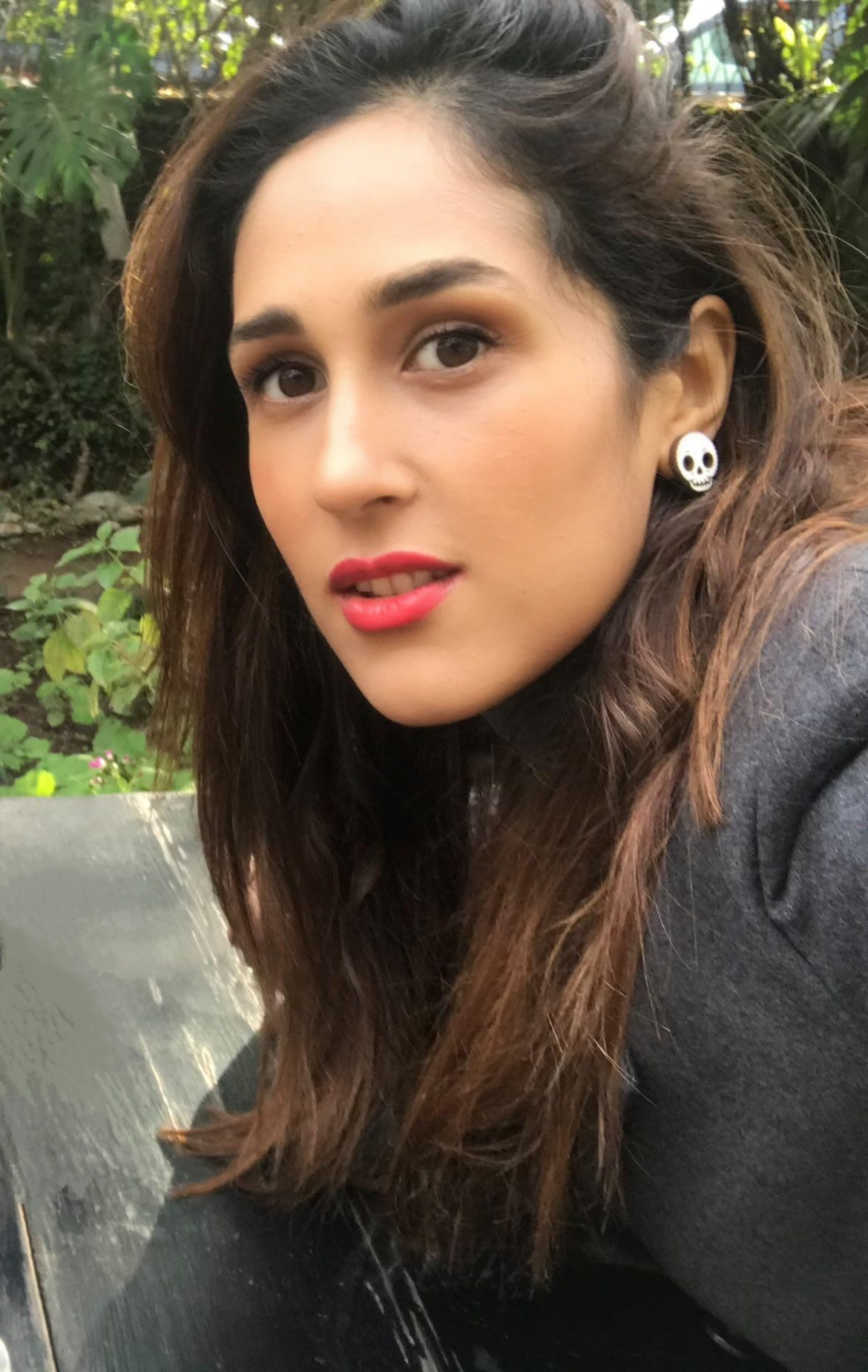
- Sethi in 2023
- Born: Mira Sethi; January 12, 1987 (age 39); Lahore, Punjab, Pakistan
- Education: Lahore Grammar School; Cheltenham Ladies' College
- Alma mater: Wellesley College
- Occupations: Actress, journalist
- Parent(s): Najam Sethi (father); Jugnu Mohsin (mother)
- Relatives: Ali Sethi (brother); Moni Mohsin (aunt)

Mira Sethi (born January 12, 1987) is a Pakistani actress and writer. The daughter of journalists Najam Sethi and Jugnu Mohsin, Sethi attended Lahore Grammar School and Cheltenham Ladies' College. She graduated from Wellesley College 2010 and spent her junior year at the University of Oxford. At Wellesley, she studied English and South Asian studies, and was the student speaker at her commencement ceremony, becoming the first Pakistani to take on the role. Sethi was a Robert L. Bartley fellow and an assistant book editor at The Wall Street Journal for about two years and also contributed political commentary for the newspaper, particularly on the subject of Pakistan. In 2011, Sethi returned to Pakistan to pursue an acting career. Her first role was playing Natasha in the ARY Digital serial drama Silvatein, followed by Mohabat Subh Ka Sitara Hai, which aired on Hum TV.

== Career ==
=== Acting career ===
Sethi made her acting debut in 2013 with her first appearance in a leading role in ARY Digital's Silvatein alongside Aamina Sheikh. The same year she appeared in a supporting role in Mohabat Subh Ka Sitara Hai, written by Umera Ahmad. In 2016, she received praise for her performance of a young dreamy painter in Momina Duraid's Dil Banjaara, where she played the leading role alongside Sanam Saeed and Adnan Malik. Sethi made her film debut in 2018 with Meenu Gaur and Farjad Nabi's 7 Din Mohabbat In as a British-Pakistani returnee. Her performance as a controlling and cunning elder member of the family in 2021 Ramadan special Chupke Chupke was met with critical praise, and further praise came from her portrayal of a Punjabi househelp in Hum TV's Paristan in the following year.

In 2023, Sethi starred in the Pakistani television series Kuch Ankahi, directed by Nadeem Baig, where she essayed the role of Samiya, "an obedient daughter, but...also a strong woman with a logical mind." Sethi received praise for her sensitive and relatable portrayal of Samiya.

=== Writing career ===
Sethi's first literary fiction work, Are You Enjoying?, was published by Knopf, an imprint of Penguin Random House, in the United States, and Bloomsbury, in the United Kingdom in 2021. A collection of short stories based on life, identity, desire, power, and religion in contemporary Pakistan, Are You Enjoying? was described as being a provocative and striking debut by Publishers Weekly. Pakistan's leading English-language daily, DAWN, called Sethi's voice "one that is as fresh as it is formidable." In its review of the short story collection, The Hindu praised Sethi for her crisp writing style that "nudge[s] the reader into the everyday lives of the relatable protagonists." The National Book Review, a U.S.-based literary journal, called Are You Enjoying? "a deeply satisfying debut," stating "Sethi keenly catches subtle class distinctions but also brings wise insight into her characters as they grapple with questions of relocation and dislocation and matches it with a sharp edge." The National, a UAE-based newspaper, called Sethi's book "A delightfully daring debut." Are You Enjoying? was longlisted for The Story Prize and was included in Vogue's 2021 'Best Books to Read' list.

== Activism ==
Sethi is a vocal advocate for women's rights in Pakistan and South Asia, stating in an interview: "I believe equal rights are the symbol of every successful society. The oppression of women in Pakistan is getting out of hand." Sethi frequently participates in Pakistan's Aurat March to express support for women's rights and call for greater accountability for violence against Pakistani women. Lending her support for the feminist slogan "Mera Jism Meri Marzi" popularized during the Aurat March, Sethi stated: "A lot of people said it should have been Meri Zindagi, Meri Marzi, (my life, my choice) or Mera Wujood, Meri Marzi (my existence my choice). The point is, the slogan was so triggering to men because of the word jism (body). When they think of jism, they think of all things sexual. Whereas Mera Jism, Meri Marzi is women fundamentally saying you don’t get to set the terms of my life, my body, my decisions, my agency, you don’t get to dictate." In a 2023 op-ed published in The New Yorker, Sethi asserted: "To be a woman in Pakistan is to encounter...the cultural assumption that sexual assault can be prevented by dressing and behaving "modestly," no matter that [closed-circuit television] footage of busy streets in Pakistani cities routinely shows women in burqas being harassed."

== Filmography ==
=== Films ===
- 7 Din Mohabbat In as Princess Sonu

=== Television ===
Year	Title	Role	Notes
2013	Silvatein	Natasha	
2013	Mohabat Subh Ka Sitara Hai	Rabia	
2014	Jaanam	Bushra	
2014	Uff Yeh Parosi	Aimen	Telefilm
2015	Dilfareb	Dr. Gul Bakht	
2015	Mujhe Kucch Kehna Hai	Simaab	
2017	Preet Na Kariyo Koi	Mariam	
2016	Tujhse Naam Hamara	Zoya	Telefilm
2016	Jhoot	Sadaf	
2016	Khushboo Ka Safar	Alia	
2016	Dil Banjaara	Shama	
2019	Yeh Dil Mera	Neelofer Farooq	
2021	Chupke Chupke	Minto “Gul Aappa”	
2022	Paristan	Zubeida	
2023	Kuch Ankahi	Samiya Agha	
2024	Very Filmy	Sanam	
2026	Dr. Bahu	Dr. Amber	

== Personal life ==
In November 2019, Sethi married her long-time boyfriend, Bilal Siddiqui in California. Bilal is working for the World Bank Group.

In September 2025, in a podcast interview, Sethi confirmed that she and Siddiqui had divorced in March 2023.

Sethi resides in Lahore, Karachi, and San Francisco.
