= Samra Bukhari =

Pakistani novelist

Samra Bukhari is a Pakistani novelist, screenwriter and playwright. She has written several television series for the satellite television networks in Pakistan since 2011 and is also associated with writing for Urdu journals and digests. Some of her commercially successful series are Kis Din Mera Viyah Howay Ga (2011), Gohar-e-Nayab (2013), Gul-e-Rana (2015), Ghar Titli Ka Par (2017), Silsilay (2018).

== Notable work ==
=== Novels ===
- Aainon Kay Dais May
- Hum Say Hai Zamana
- Apni Manzil Apnay Rastay
- Band Honton Ki Baat
- Daairon Kay Darmiyan
- Dill Da Dais
- Hasti Kay Aahang
- Chahay Jo Puray Dill Say
- Aik Faisla Uska Tha
- Dil Kay Andar Ik Rasta Hai
- Aabaad Hain Tujh Say Mairay Khwaab

=== Television series ===
- Hulla Ray
- Kis Din Mera Viyah Howay Ga
- Jazeera
- Meka Aur Susral
- Gul-e-Rana
- Bholi Bano
- Hiddat
- Ghar Titli Ka Par
- Silsilay
- Seep
- Lmahay
- Piya Naam Ka Diya
- Aik Aur Munafiq – Jhatka
- Mujhay Vida Kar
- Paristan
