= Dil Banjaara =

Pakistani television series

- Genre: Family drama Romantic drama
- Created by: Momina Duraid
- Written by: Faiza Iftikhar
- Directed by: Siraj-ul-Haque
- Starring: Adnan Malik; Sanam Saeed; Mira Sethi; Hina Khawaja Bayat; Sakina Samo; Samina Ahmad
- Country of origin: Pakistan
- Original language: Urdu
- No. of episodes: 24

Production
- Executive producer: Momina Duraid
- Producers: MD Productions; Naughty Forty Productions

Original release
- Network: Hum TV
- Release: 14 October 2016 – 31 March 2017

Dil Banjaara (Urdu: دل بنجارا lit: The Wanderer Heart), previously entitled Gypsy is a Pakistani drama serial that aired on Hum TV on 14 October 2016, preceded by Jhoot for the 2016 television season. It is directed by Siraj-ul-Haque, written by Faiza Iftikhar and produced by Momina Duraid as a night programming all under her production company MD Productions. It stars Adnan Malik as Sikandar an aspiring photographer along with Sanam Saeed as female lead and Mira Sethi as supporting character.

== Plot ==
Nida is a girl with a lot of dreams; she wants to travel around the world, write poetry and live carefree. Unfortunately, she has a lot of responsibilities. She lives with a physically challenged father, mentally disturbed mother, and a strict Tayi Ammi; and to top it all up, she has a Phupo too who wants Nida to marry as soon as possible. Nida has other plans though. During her trip to Nepal, she meets Sikander, called Sikki, who shares the same passions as Nida. He lives with his aunt, Mehtab. Mehtab has raised Sikander like her own son as Sikander's parents had died while he was very young. Mehtab's daughter, Shama is interested in Sikander and believes he will marry her one day. But Sikki's heart lies elsewhere and the feelings are reciprocated. One day, Sikki calls Shama to meet him so he can tell her that he doesn't wants to marry her and that she is mistaken that he loves her. Sikki is very nervous because he considers Shama his best friend and does not want to hurt or lose her. He tells Shama to sit in the car but before he can tell her anything, Shama sees flowers across the road and runs to buy them but gets hit by a car and gets physically disabled. After her accident, Sikki feels guilty and thinks that whatever happened to Shama is because of him. He starts to take care of Shama and tells his aunt Mehtab that he will marry Shama. In the meantime, arrangements have been made for Nida to marry her cousin. Will true love find its way?

== Cast ==
- Sanam Saeed as Nida Nafees
- Adnan Malik as Sikandar
- Mira Sethi as Shama
- Sakina Samo as Nishat, Mukhtar & Nafees' sister
- Mohsin Raza Gillani as Nafees, Nida's Father
- Hina Khawaja Bayat as Fasiha Nafees, Nida's Mother
- Samina Ahmad as Zubaida Mukhtar, Nida's Aunt
- Madiha Rizvi as Zahra Mukhtar, Nida's Cousin
- Annie Zaidi as Mehtab
- Munawar Saeed as Mukhtar Bhai, Nida's Uncle
- Danial Afzal Khan as Zaman, Nida's Cousin
- Hanan Sameed as Ayaz
- Beena Masroor as Ayaz's mother
- Shermeen Ali as Meesha
- Rashida Tabassum
- Iqra Atiq
- Sarah Ali
- Hannan Sameed as Ayaz
- Asma Saif
- Adnan Saeed as Deepak Panhwar

== Production ==
=== Casting ===
Adnan Malik was cast for the character of Sikandar, an aspiring photographer. In early January 2016, describing his role Malik said, "I read a bunch of scripts, there was also interest from across the border but nothing clicked quite like Gypsy." He further said "I play the role of Sikander, who's an aspiring photographer, a part of him that resonates with me because that's what peaked my interest in the arts when my father bought me my first camera. He's a very rugged, outdoorsy kinda guy, very different from Khalil. There's just this lightness to him. So the show revolves around this guy who's a bit of a wanderer and his equation with two ladies, a non-traditional love triangle of sorts." It was later announced that actress Sanam Saeed had replaced Mawra Hocane. Saeed, speaking about Gypsy, said "Basically I was offered the script initially, but I couldn't do it back then. However, later when Mawra (Hocane) got caught up with something else and I was available, I signed the project,”. “I hadn't done easy-breezy love stories previously, so Gypsy offered something new.”. She further went on to say that "My character is of a girl who's a gypsy at heart. She's a wanderer and a free spirit. She is very much attached to her parents and unlike other characters in the serial, she doesn't retaliate. Her parents are very supportive, and even when she disagrees, she understands their point. So there's no struggle; it doesn't have any heavy moral or drama. There is a little bit of conflict, but no negativity or a bechari of any sort." and "Mohsin Gilani plays my father's character, whereas the brilliant Hina Bayat will be essaying my mother's role. She has always been known for her versatile characters, and her role in Gyspy is also something completely different from what she has done previously," she commented. "It also has a strong supporting cast; we have Madiha Rizvi, Samina Ahmed and Munawar Siddiqui as well.".

=== Filming ===
Production on series began on 25 May 2016 in various cities across the country including Nepal's popular Madhyapur Thimi and Bhaktapur. Teasers were released on 6 October 2016 with the name [Dil Banjaara], replaced by name [Gypsy] and was finalized to replace Jhoot and was aired on 14 October 2016.

== Broadcast ==
Dil Banjaara was only premiered on Hum TV on 14 October 2016, and aired weekly. It last aired on 31 March 2017 and ended after 24 episodes.

=== Release ===
The show is available to stream online on MX Player and Starzplay. It was also made available on iflix, however it pulled off in 2017.

== Reception ==
While reviewing the first episode, A reviewer from DAWN Images praised the strong characteristion, Iftikhar's writing and acting performances of Saeed and Sethi. In a review published in The News International, Aamna Haider Isani critiqued the series for its excessive focus on melodrama and sorrow, deviating from its initial lighthearted premise, with tearfest of the lead characters becoming a tedious and unengaging narrative.

== See also ==
- 2016 in Pakistani television
- List of programs broadcast by Hum TV
