= Wafa (TV series) =

Pakistani television series

- Title screen
- Genre: Family drama Romantic drama
- Created by: Babar Javed
- Written by: Shamim Baazil
- Directed by: Furqan T. Siddiqui
- Starring: Babar Ali; Mansha Pasha
- Country of origin: Pakistan
- Original language: Urdu
- No. of episodes: 20

Production
- Producers: Babar Javed; Asif Raza Mir
- Production location: Lahore
- Camera setup: Multi-camera setup
- Production company: A&B Entertainment

Original release
- Network: Geo Entertainment
- Release: 12 April – 10 August 2016

Wafa (English: Loyalty) is a Pakistani drama television series premiered on Geo Entertainment on 12 April. It is produced by Babar Javed and Asif Raza Mir under A&B Entertainment. It has Babar Ali and Mansha Pasha in lead roles.

== Synopsis ==
The story revolves around Wafa, who, after her father's death, is left alone to deal with the family debts. Daniyal, a friend of Wafa's father, sends a notice requiring her to repay the debts her father owed him or he will foreclose and sell their house. In order to sort things out, Wafa decides to meet Daniyal; however, Daniyal refuses to waive the debt. As Wafa, along with her mother and sister, continues to worry, Daniyal calls Wafa again and proposes marriage to her and in return promises to forgo the loan. Left with no choice, Wafa reluctantly agrees to marry Daniyal and starts living with him. As Wafa has married him secretly without talling her own family, her mother and sister do not realise the reason for Wafa's absence. The foundation of marriage between Daniyal and Wafa weakens when Saira, a previous friend of Daniyal, makes a comeback in his life.

In a series of trials and tribulations, Wafa is tested time and again, while Daniyal fails to keep Wafa happy. Will Daniyal ask Wafa to make one more sacrifice, will Wafa let go of one thing that she loves the most?

== Cast ==
- Babar Ali as Daniyal
- Mansha Pasha as Wafa
- Nausheen Shah as Saira
- Wahaj Ali as Hashir
- Maryam Effendi as Maham
- Saad Qureshi as Umair
- Rabia Noreen as Wafa's mother
- Manzoor Qureshi as Saira's father
- Rashid Farooqi as Wafa's uncle
- Farah Nadir as Wafa's aunt
- Mehboob Sultan as Irtaza

== See also ==
- List of programs broadcast by Geo TV
