= Faraha =

- Town
- Location in Uttar Pradesh, India Faraha (India)
- Coordinates: 27°19′18″N 78°28′22″E
- Country: India
- State: Uttar Pradesh
- District: Firozabad

Population (2001)
  - Total: 5,809

Languages
  - Official: Hindi
- Time zone: UTC+5:30 (IST)
- Vehicle registration: UP
- Website: up.gov.in

Faraha, also spelled Fariha and Phariha, is a village in Azamgarh district in the state of Uttar Pradesh, India.

There is a railway station in Faraha. The population of Faraha is estimated to be around 7,000 people.

== Notable people ==
- Hamiduddin Farahi (1863–1930), Islamic scholar and eponym of the Farahi school
