= Tumhare Siwa =

- Genre: Drama; Romance; Revenge
- Written by: Wasi Shah
- Directed by: Sakina Samo
- Starring: Ahsan Khan; Aisha Khan, Noor Hassan Rizvi; Mansha Pasha
- Opening theme: "Kuch Nahi Chahiye Tumhare Siwa" by Faiza Mujahid
- Country of origin: Pakistan
- Original language: Urdu
- No. of episodes: 21

Production
- Producer: Moomal Entertainment
- Running time: 30–45 minutes

Original release
- Network: Hum TV
- Release: 21 August 2015 – 15 January 2016

Tumhare Siwa (Without You) is a 2015 Pakistani romantic drama serial. It is based on a novel by Wasi Shah, airing on Hum TV. The series is directed by Sakina Samo and produced by Moomal Entertainment. It stars Ahsan Khan, Aisha Khan, Noor Hassan Rizvi, Mansha Pasha, Salina Sipra, Lubna Aslam in leading roles. The drama airs every Friday at 8pm. It is about two couples whose deep love turns to deep hatred.

== Characters ==
Aazar (Ahsan Khan) acts as brother of Tania/Tani, husband of Rania (Aisha Khan), father of Dani. His close friend is Arsal (Noor Hassan Rizvi), whose wife is Samra (Mansha Pasha). Rania has a brother, Aziz (Mustafa Changazi) while Aazar has a sister Tania (Salina Sipra). Tania is married to Babar. Arsal and Samra have a daughter, Neni, and Aazar has a son, Dani.

== Summary ==
Tumhare Siwa is the story of two best friends Arsal and Aazar. Arsal is happily married to Samra and Aazar married to Rania. In addition, Aazar has a sister Tania. Arsal has a daughter, Rania and Aazar has a son. The two couples are living happily and proceeding with their lives.

The story takes a twist when Samra starts having severe headaches, and is later diagnosed as having a brain tumor. The cost of the surgery is unaffordable for Arsal. During their tension of gathering money for Samra's surgery, they come to know that the "family expenses" of Aazar can be paid by his insurance from his job. Arsal decides to divorce his beloved wife Samra. Hence she can be engaged in a "paper marriage" to Aazar. Hence, the expenses for the treatment will be paid by his insurance and when everything gets smooth again and Samra recovers, he will remarry his love. But when Samra is almost cured, Arsal and Samra witness a car accident in which Arsal dies and Samra gets injured. Now Azzar has responsibility for his two wives i.e. Samra and Rania. He starts liking Samra more than Raania. Rania gets angry and tries to convince Aazar to divorce to Samra. Aazar refuses saying that it is not possible because he has to support his late friend's ( Arsal's) wife i.e. Samra, both financially and emotionally. The real hero of this drama is Babar. He is the mac daddy and Tania/Tani's husband who likes Samra as well. When the thing is opened, Aazar slaps Babar in no care that he is his brother-in-law (his sister Tania's husband). Babar tells this to Tania that he is slapped by Tania's brother but Tania doesn't trusts and faiths on what Babar says because she know very well her brother who can't do it.

== Cast ==
- Ahsan Khan As Azar
- Ayesha Khan as Rania
- Noor Hassan Rizvi as Arsal
- Mansha Pasha as Samra
- Mustafa Changazi as Azfar
- Lubna Aslam as Rania's mother
- Salina Sipra as Tania/Tani
- Hanzala Shahid as Nomel
- Ayesha Khan as Arsal's mother
- Kinza Fahad as Narmeen (Naini)
