= Pakeezah (TV series) =

- پاکیزه
- Genre: Romance; Serial drama
- Written by: Bushra Ansari
- Directed by: Misbah Khalid
- Starring: Aamina Sheikh; Adnan Siddiqui; Alyy Khan; Angeline Malik
- Opening theme: 'Dhoondo Ge Agar Mulkon' by Abida Parveen
- Country of origin: Pakistan
- Original language: Urdu
- No. of episodes: 28

Production
- Executive producer: Moomal Shunaid
- Producer: Moomal Entertainment
- Cinematography: Shahid Mahmood
- Editors: Syed Suhail Naqvi; Fayyaz; Wahab
- Running time: 35-40 minutes

Original release
- Network: Hum TV
- Release: 11 February – 25 August 2016

Pakeezah is a Pakistani thriller drama television series that was first aired on 11 February 2016 on Hum TV. It stars Aamina Sheikh, Adnan Siddiqui, Alyy Khan, and Angeline Malik. The series revolves around the struggle of a female artist between her passion and her relationship with her husband. The original soundtrack of the series is based on the song Dhoondo Ge Agar by Abida Parveen.

== Synopsis ==
The drama is based on strained relations between Pakeeza (Aamina Sheikh) and Jibran (Alyy Khan). They have a daughter, Kiran, who is irritated by Jibran torturing Pakeeza day after day. Jibran has a sister, Naima (Angeline Malik), who is married to Ahmer (Khaled Anam) and has a daughter, Shehzadi/Maham. Kiran likes Shehzadi and her parents more than her own. Ahmer has a brother Azeem (Adnan Siddiqui), who befriends Pakeeza. Each episode of the drama includes a fight between Pakeeza and Jibran.

== Plot ==
The drama revolves around the woman, Pakeeza (Aamina Sheikh), who is a painter and housewife. Her paintings are good, and she is awarded many times in the media because of her talent. She is married to Jibran (Alyy Khan), a misogynist, who doesn't care about his wife and beats her often because he is jealous of her fame. Pakeeza has a daughter, Kiran, who is depressed because of her parents' fights. Pakeeza is the best friend of Naima (Angeline Malik), who later became her sister-in-law as Naima's brother Jibran came into her life. Pakeeza finds solace in her friend Azeem (Adnan Siddiqui), who helps her in every difficulty.

== Cast ==
- Aamina Sheikh as Pakeezah
- Ali Khan as Jibran
- Adnan Siddiqui as Azeem
- Angeline Malik as Naima
- Khaled Anam as Ahmer
- Iqra Chaudhry as Kiran Jibran
- Sohail Hashmi as Sohail “Talpur Sahab”
- Mariam Mirza as Aisha Talpur
- Sara Asim as Shahzadi
- Faseeh Sardar as Saif
- Awais Waseer

== Production ==
Sheikh was approached by Sultana Siddiqui to star in the series, written by Bushra Ansari and directed by Misbah Khalid. She initially hesitated, feeling the role was unoriginal and would trap her in a familiar pattern. Sheikh described feeling pressured to fulfill others' expectations rather than pursuing her own artistic aspirations.

== Digital release ==
The series was made available on Iflix; however, in 2019, all the episodes were removed. Still, it is available on the Indian streaming platform MX Player.

== See also ==
- List of programs broadcast by Hum TV
- 2016 in Pakistani television
