= Maana Ka Gharana =

Television series

- Genre: family drama Romantic drama Serial drama
- Written by: Aliya Bukhari
- Directed by: Shahzad Kashmiri
- Starring: Shehroz Sabzwari; Shamil Khan; Zuhab Khan; Sana Javed
- Opening theme: "Ishq Bacha Hai Bigra Hooa" by Nabeel Shaukat Ali
- Country of origin: Pakistan
- Original language: Urdu
- No. of seasons: 1
- No. of episodes: 18

Production
- Producer: Momina Duraid

Original release
- Network: Hum TV
- Release: 9 December 2015 – 6 April 2016

Maana Ka Gharana (transl. Maana's Family) is a Pakistani television series of Hum TV that was first aired on 9 December 2015. It is written by Aliya Bukhari, directed by Shahzad Kashmiri and produced by Momina Duraid under MD Productions.

== Plot ==
Maana Ka Gharana includes Maana's (Sana Javed) father Ghalib who is the brother of Malik (Shamil Khan) and maternal uncle of Khizer (Shehroz Sabzwari). Khizer likes Maana but she only considers him a friend. Maana wanted to marry a rich man who could show her the world. Maana doesn't like her village and wants to see the city of lights. Maana is happy to be engaged to Gul-Bahar (Malik's wife)'s nephew Shehryar, a rich businessman. Khizer never told Maana about his feelings for her. He pretends to be happy that Maana is marrying Shehryar. Saleha (Raheela Agha) Zaari's sister and Maana's mother also wanted Maana to marry Shehryar. She thinks that Khizer deserves a much better girl than Maana because of her child-like behaviour, while Khizer behaves more maturely. Shehryar does not like Maana's friendship with Khizer. Shehryar start hatching a plan to spoil Khizer's good image in everyone's eyes. He succeeds in blameing Khizer for stealing the precious diamond ring which he has brought for Maana. Everyone is shocked when the ring is found from Khizer's room. Saleha asked Khizer to leave the house. Khizer swears that he is innocent but no one believes him. He leaves the house on a rainy night. In image, Maana found Shahryar with a woman. She asked this from servant, he said, she was Saman (Sarah Khan). She said, where is she now? He said that she died after their divorce.

== Cast ==
- Shehroz Sabzwari as Khizer
- Sana Javed as Maana
- Daniyal Raheel as Shehriyar
- Humayun Gul
- Shamil Khan as Maalik
- Erum Akhtar as Zari
- Zuhab Khan as Happy
- Humayun Fazal Chaudhry as Ghalib
- Raheela Agha as Saleha
- Ayesha Toor as Gul Bahar
- Sarah Khan as Saman

== Production ==
The series was earlier titled Ishq Bacha Hai. The production location of the serial was Azad Kashmir.
