= Abro (serial) =

Pakistani television series

- Title screen
- Genre: Family drama Serial drama
- Created by: Momina Duraid
- Written by: Qaisra Hayat
- Screenplay by: Umera Ahmed
- Directed by: Ilyas Kashmiri
- Starring: Eshal Fayyaz; Noor Hassan Rizvi; Zainab Ahmed; Ahmed Zeb
- Opening theme: "Abro"; Singer; Sahir Ali Bagga; Lyrics by Captain Imran
- Country of origin: Pakistan
- Original language: Urdu
- No. of episodes: 24

Production
- Producer: Momina Duraid
- Editor: Abbas Arzoo
- Camera setup: Multi-Camera
- Running time: 30-45 minutes
- Production company: MD Productions

Original release
- Network: Hum TV
- Release: 20 December 2015 – 4 June 2016

Abro is a Pakistani television drama serial that originally aired on Hum TV on 20 December 2015. It was directed by Ilyas Kashmiri, based on a script by Qaisra Hayat, and screenplay by Umera Ahmad. It stars Eshal Fayyaz, Noor Hassan Rizvi, Zainab Ahmed, and Ahmed Zeb in pivotal roles.

The show was moved from the Sunday 8p.m. slot to the Saturday 8p.m. slot after Gul-e-Rana ended and another drama series, Udaari, took the Sunday evening slot at Hum TV.

== Plot summary ==
Abro is based on two orphaned siblings, Abro and Hamid. Their mother Sakina (Asma Abbas) worked as a peon in a college and works for the principal. Abro and Hamid do not respect their mother and are ill-mannered. Abro is in love with her friend Ali, son of Farzana and Zafar, brother of Abid, Samra, and Tayyaba.

Abro and Ali like each other and want to marry, but Ali's family doesn't like Abro's bad manners and doesn't accept her as their daughter-in-law. However, Ali has a cousin from his mother Farzana's side (Farzana's niece, Shahida's daughter), Fouzia Jamshed, and Zarmina. Ali's family wants Ali to marry Fouzia, but he refuses as he is already in love with Abro, and Fouzia also has feelings for Ali. At the engagement, Ali is not happy for his engagement. Abro decides to leave Ali, but he forgives her and decides to break his engagement with Fouzia. He finally breaks his engagement and marries Abro through a court marriage. It shocks both families. Initially, they live in Ali's friend's house, but soon they decide to live on the upper floor of Ali's family.

Ali's job does not bring in enough money, so he is unable to fulfill some duties. They finally give birth to a child whose name, Afsheen, is chosen by Ali's mother. While, the on other side, because of Ali and Fouzia's separation, Farzana and Zafar decide to marry Abid to Fouzia. Farzana's sister Shahida, mother of Fouzia first thinks that Abid is younger than Fouzia but they marry. The show skips ahead 4 months, and Abid and Fouzia have a child whose name is chosen by Farzana as Ahmed Ali. Ali's parents also marry Samra and Tayyaba in good dynasties. Abid does more to help his brother in any way. Afsheen cries a lot. Ali decides to sell his bike to take something for her (Afsheen).

Fouzia also gives birth later to a daughter, Aima. Ali's mother treats Abro as a servant. Hamid is also in love with another woman and secretly marries her and goes to Kuwait. The show again takes a leap of 4 years when Afsheen, Ahmed Ali, and Aima became school-age pupils. Ali asks Abid to help him in Afsheen's school so that Afsheen can learn, but Farzana comes and refuses it. The show again takes a leap of 20 years leap when all these pupils became 20-year-old boys and girls. At this time, all are changed. Afsheen does all the things that Abro didn't do for her mother. She also pays concentration on her studies.

Ahmed Ali and Aima grow and are very bad to their parents. They do not study well and do not follow what their parents tell them. Unfortunately, Afsheen can't continue her dream to be a doctor due to financial issues with her family, and she does a Bachelor of Arts instead. Ahmed loves Afsheen too, but Afsheen doesn't know. Fauzia still does not like Abro and her family. Afsheen is harassed by a man at the college and didn't go there for a week. Farzana forces Afsheen to marry a man who initially was meant to marry Aima but later backed out as the family wanted a traditional girl, not a modernized girl (Aima). At the end of the play, Ahmad tried to convince Afsheen to run away with her. However, Afsheen when thinking of her parents' trust in her, refuses to run with Ahmed and asks him to marry Samra's daughter and gives up on his love. But their whole conversation is heard by Abid, Fouzia, and their grandmother. Abid and Fouzia feel very ashamed of not bringing up their children better and praise Afsheen for her respectable behaviour and dignity.

Moreover, Aima turns out having a friendship with a boy named Fahad, who happens to be a thief and is wanted by the police. Once the police visit Aima's house to take a cell phone gifted to Aima by Fahad (which was actually stolen from a rich woman), her parents get even more ashamed. Already regretting their leniency in bringing up children, they decide to stop Aima from going to college. Meanwhile, the grandmother, also ashamed of trusting Fouzia and hating Abro, realizes her mistake and forgives Abro and her son, and also asks for Abro's forgiveness. In the end, they decide to get Ahmed engaged to Afsheen. Ammara's daughter Sania, who was expected to be the fiancée of Ahmed also confronts Ahmed about his emotions for Afsheen and about her plans of not desiring any stay in Pakistan or marrying Ahmed. The drama ends with Ahmed and Afsheen's engagement, where everyone is happy and giving blessings to each other.

== Cast ==
- Abbas Arzoo
- Eshal Fayyaz as Abroo
- Noor Hassan Rizvi as Ali Zafar
- Zainab Ahmed as Fouzia Jamshed
- Ahmad Zeb as Abid Zafar
- Ehteshamuddin as Zafar
- Asma Abbas as Sakina
- Ismat Zaidi as College Principal
- Akbar Islam as Jamshed
- Humaira Bano as Shahida
- Farah Shah as Zubaida
- Arisha Razi as Aima
- Tabrez Ali Shah as Ahmed
- Hina Altaf as Afsheen
- Imran Ashraf as Hamid
- Rimha Khan as Sania
- as Abbas Arzoo

== Reception ==
The drama series became popular soon after it went on-air. It made Hum TV the slot leader on Sundays. Just in its first episode, Abro achieved a TRP of 2.8 (over the 15 mins time slot of 8:30pm–8:45pm) on 20 December 2015. Over the 70 mins time slot (8pm-9:10pm) on the same day, Abro achieved a TRP of 2.1.

In the U.K., Abro's first episode raked in 33,600 viewers at 8pm, whereas the second episode attracted 36,200 viewers. Escalating further, the third episode of Abro in U.K. registered 63,700 viewers. The ninth episode recorded 98,800 viewers, making it the most watched on the channel. The eleventh episode garnered 79,000 viewers. The thirteenth episode broke records as Abro delivered 111,100 viewers – peaking at 136,400 viewers.

In Pakistan, the thirteenth episode Abro gained a TRP of 4.6 (over the 15 mins time slot of 8:30pm–8:45pm) on 13 March 2016. Over the 70 mins time slot (8pm-9:10pm) on the same day, Abro achieved a TRP of 3.3, making it a place in the top 3 dramas during the time. It is the most watched on the channel on Sundays. It is quite popular in the UK with over 60,000 views per episode on average.

== See also ==
- 2015 in Pakistani television
- List of programs broadcast by Hum TV
