= Mohabat Subh Ka Sitara Hai =

Pakistani television drama serial

- Title screen
- Genre: Drama, romance, tragedy
- Based on: Ye jo Subha Ka Ik Sitara Hai by Umera Ahmad
- Written by: Umera Ahmad
- Directed by: Sakina Samo
- Starring: Sanam Jung; Meekal Zulfiqar; Adeel Hussain; Farah Shah
- Theme music composer: Shebi
- Opening theme: "Ye Jo Ik Subha Ka Sitara" by Harshdeep Kaur
- Composer: Shani
- Country of origin: Pakistan
- Original language: Urdu
- No. of episodes: 23

Production
- Producer: Momina Duraid
- Production locations: Karachi, Sindh
- Cinematography: Ilyas Kashmiri
- Editors: Tanveer Alam; Afzal Fayaz
- Camera setup: Multi-camera setup
- Running time: 36 - 40 minutes

Original release
- Network: Hum TV
- Release: 13 December 2013 – 16 May 2014

Mohabat Subh Ka Sitara Hai (Urdu: محبت صبح کا ستارہ ہے, lit. 'Love is the Morning star') is a Pakistani television series that aired on Hum TV from December 13, 2013, to May 16, 2014, spanning 23 episodes. The series, a tragic drama, incorporates elements of family drama and romance. It revolves around Romaisa, an orphan girl who faces hardships after her parents' demise and later at her in-laws' house following her husband's death in a car accident. Each episode explores Romaisa's journey in love, respect, and life.

Based on Umera Ahmad's novel "Ye Jo Subha Ka Ik Sitara Hai," the series was adapted for the screen by Ahmad herself. Preceded by Ahmad's Kankar and Zindagi Gulzar Hai, it became the third consecutive serial by the writer to air in the same network primetime slot. Directed by Sakina Samo and produced by Momina Duraid, Mohabbat Subh Ka Sitara Hai features Sanam Jung, Meekal Zulfiqar, and Adeel Hussain in lead roles, supported by Mansha Pasha, Farah Shah, and Annie Zaidi. It marked Sakina Samo's fifth collaboration with Ahmad after previously directing her serials Wujood-e-Laraib (2004) and Amar Bail (2005).

The series garnered twelve nominations at the 3rd Hum Awards, winning two: Best Actor Popular for Zulfiqar and Best Supporting Actress for Pasha. It was also listed among the top fourteen drama serials of 2014. It was aired in India on Zindagi, from 13 May to 8 June 2016.

== Plot ==
The story revolves around a poor orphan girl, Romaisa (Sanam Jung), who lives with her cruel and money-minded aunt (Farah Shah). The only loyal people in her life are her friend Nosheen, along with Nabeel and his brother Zeeshan. A rich businessman, Nabeel (Meekal Zulfiqar), falls in love with Romaisa and marries her. Nabeel's family - except for his younger brother, Zeeshan (Adeel Hussain) - behave badly with Romaisa. Romaisa's aunt and cousins frequently demand financial favors and luxuries from the couple. Nabeel never refuses Romaisa and tries his best to make her happy. Some months after marriage, Nabeel dies in a car crash. Now, it is easy for his family to treat the meek Romaisa like an unpaid servant. Her aunt takes her back in her home, as she knows that Nabeel had transferred a lot of money and a house on Romaisa's name. Her aunt wants to file a petition in the court for the property of Romaisa and wants her to marry her son (Sajid). But Zeeshan takes her back in their house.

Back at her in-laws' house, Romaisa continues to face hardship, as she is forced to handle domestic labor alongside the servants without receiving any appreciation. It is found that Nabeel has willed all his wealth to Romaisa, who is expecting his child. Soon, Romaisa and Nabeel's daughter, Maham, is born. Romaisa's father-in-law coaxes his younger son, Zeeshan, to marry the young widow, pretending that this is for her security. But the real intention is that Nabeel's share of wealth should stay within the family. Zeeshan, an upright police officer, has already gone through a Nikah (wedding ceremony) with Rabia (Mira Sethi), though they are waiting for the rukhsati after which they can live together as a couple. His father suggests that Zeeshan could merely have a paper marriage with Romaisa. Zeeshan tries to discuss the matter with Rabia, but she demands a khula (divorce). Zeeshan finally agrees to marry Romaisa, but he remains indifferent to her.

Zeeshan is mostly away from home because of his job. One day, he gets shot in the course of his police duty. He has to remain with his family while he recovers. Romaisa takes care of him and he begins to understand her situation. He also gets attached to little Maham, and she starts calling him 'Papa'. Zeeshan's mother asks him to marry another girl and leave Romaisa to her fate, but he refuses. Now he realizes his parents' true intentions in arranging his marriage to Romaisa. He talks to his parents about it, and, disappointed with their attitude, decides to leave the house with Romaisa and Maham.

== Cast ==
Following are list of main cast of drama serial:

- Sanam Jung as Romaisa Sikandar
- Mikaal Zulfiqar as Nabeel Sikandar
- Adeel Hussain as Zeeshan Sikandar
- Mansha Pasha as Aliya, Romaisa's cousin (her aunt's daughter).
- Mira Sethi as Rabia, Zeeshan's ex-wife
- Farah Shah as Romaisa's Khala
- Naeem Tahir as Nabeel and Zeeshan's father
- Annie Zaidi as Fakhra (Nabeel and Zeeshan's Mother)
- Ali Tahir as Nabeel's elder brother
- Tara Mehmood as Nabeel's brother wife
- Hira Tareen as Hamna, Nabeel's sister and Romaisa's sister-in-law
- Hassan Noman as Hassan, Hira's husband and Nabeel's brother in law
- Saniya Shamshad as Nayab, Nabeel brother's wife sister (Guest Appearance/cameo)
- Rashid Farooqi as Romaisa's father (only flashbacks)
- Kiran Fatima Bader as Jameela, Romaisa's sister friend.

Additional supporting roles were portrayed by Hassan Naaz, Akbar Salam, Humaira Banu, Kausar Siddiqui, Humaira Mughal, Mehreen, Javeria, Hanif Muhammad, Jia Bukhari, Ambar, Farhat Nazar, Arshma Khan, Urooj Abbas, Salma Qadir, Zahida Batool, Akbar Khan, Maryam, Anam Javed, Ali Hadi, Adnan Gabol, Waseem Dhamiyan, Farhad Fareed and Kiran.

== Original soundtrack ==
Muhabbat Subha Ka Sitara Hai: Original Soundtrack (OST)

Soundtrack album by Harshdeep Kaur
- Released: 4 December 2013
- Recorded: 2013
- Genres: Theme song, Television soundtrack
- Length: 4:59
- Language: Urdu
- Label: M.D Productions
- Producer: Momina Duraid

The Theme song of Muhabbat Subha Ka Sitara Hai is its original soundtrack, written by Naseer Turabi the famous poet, and composed by Shani Arshad & Shaibi Arshad. The music is a label of Momina Duraid Productions. The song is sung by talented folk-Punjabi Indian singer Harshdeep Kaur who rose to fame by Katiya Karoon from the 2011 blockbuster Indian movie Rockstar. The lyrics were penned down by Naseer beautifully and gain a huge acclaim.

=== Track listing ===
All lyrics are written by Naseer Turabi; all music is composed by Shani Arshad.

| No. | Title | Artist(s) | Length |
|---|---|---|---|
| 1. | "Ye jo Ik Subha Ka Sitara hai..." | Harshdeep Kaur | 4:59 |

== Accolades ==
| Nominated year of work | Award | Category | Recipient(s) | Result |
|---|---|---|---|---|
| 2014 | 3rd Hum Awards | Best Drama Serial Popular | Momina Duraid | Nominated |
| 2014 | 3rd Hum Awards | Best Drama Serial Jury | Momina Duraid | Nominated |
| 2014 | 3rd Hum Awards | Best Director Drama Serial | Sakina Samo | Nominated |
| 2014 | 3rd Hum Awards | Best Actor Popular | Meekal Zulfiqar | Won |
| 2014 | 3rd Hum Awards | Best Actor Popular | Adeel Hussain | Nominated |
| 2014 | 3rd Hum Awards | Best Actor Jury | Meekal Zulfiqar | Nominated |
| 2014 | 3rd Hum Awards | Best Actor Jury | Adeel Hussain | Nominated |
| 2014 | 3rd Hum Awards | Best Actress Popular | Sanam Jung | Nominated |
| 2014 | 3rd Hum Awards | Best Actress Jury | Sanam Jung | Nominated |
| 2014 | 3rd Hum Awards | Best Supporting Actress | Mansha Pasha | Won |
| 2014 | 3rd Hum Awards | Best Writer Drama Serial | Umera Ahmad | Nominated |
| 2014 | 3rd Hum Awards | Best Actor in a Negative Role | Farah Shah | Nominated |

== See also ==
- List of Pakistani actresses
- List of Pakistani actors
- List of Pakistani television serials
