= Gul-e-Rana (TV series) =

2015–16 Pakistani drama serial

- Title screen of the drama
- Genre: Romance drama
- Based on: Hasti Ka Ahang by Samra Bukhari
- Written by: Samra Bukhari
- Directed by: Farooq Rind
- Starring: Sajal Aly; Feroze Khan
- Theme music composer: Waqar Ali
- Opening theme: "Man Maane Na"
- Composer: Waqar Ali
- Country of origin: Pakistan
- Original language: Urdu
- No. of episodes: 21

Production
- Producers: Momina Duraid; Humayun Saeed; Shehzad Naseeb
- Production locations: Muree, Karachi
- Camera setup: Multi-camera
- Running time: 30–45 minutes
- Production companies: Six Sigma Plus Productions, MD Productions

Original release
- Network: Hum TV
- Release: 7 November 2015 – 2 April 2016

Related
- Mol; Udaari

Gul-e-Rana (Urdu: گل رعنا, lit. 'Sweet-smelling flower') is a Pakistani romantic drama television series based on a novel by Samra Bukhari titled Hasti Ke Ahang. The series premiered on 7 November 2015 on Hum TV.

The series was directed by Farooq Rind and produced by Momina Duraid under banner MD Productions along with Humayun Saeed and Shehzad Naseeb under banner Six Sigma Plus. It stars Sajal Aly and Feroze Khan with a supporting cast of Mehmood Akhtar, Rubina Ashraf, and Jinaan Hussain.

Gul-e-Rana was known as one of the most popular series during its run. It received negative reviews and has been criticized for its misogynistic, sexist, and regressive approach. Aly's performance in the title role was however praised, which earned her, her first ever award, the Hum Award for Best Actress, and a nomination for Best TV Actress at the 16th Lux Style Awards.

== Synopsis ==
The series revolves around a girl who struggles for women's rights after being abused by the people of her society, who have a poor mentality as after marriage, men don’t respect women and treat them badly. Gul-e-Rana (Sajal Aly) tries her best to transform Adeel's mentality about women and faces many problems. In the end, Adeel has an accident and transforms into a good person. It is shown in the drama that Gul-e-Rana leaves Adeel for some time and becomes a teacher. But it is hinted in the end that both reconcile after some time.

== Plot summary ==
The series is a story of emotions, trust, relations and sympathy. It gives a note on leaving toxic relationships.

Gul-e-Rana's father dies in a car accident, and consequently her rich uncle, takes Rana, her sister, and her mother under his wings. Both of Rana's aunts hate her and warn her that all her uncle's money is for them. Meanwhile, Maria and Laila, daughters of Gul-e-Rana's aunts, are willing to do anything to marry Adeel who is the only son of Rana's uncle. Gul-e-Rana is very different from her cousins, as Rana exhibits the traits of a well-groomed and modest girl. Unlike Gul-e-Rana, her cousin Adeel is egotistic and narcissistic. To him, girls are merely a means of passing time and pleasure. He considers Gul-e-Rana perfect to marry as she wouldn’t have a say in his personal life and tries every way to trick her but she pays no heed. Meanwhile, Zafri, Rana's cousin is interested in her and wants to marry her to ensure that Maria and Adeel can marry without any hurdles. One night, Adeel misbehaves with Rana. She slaps him hard on his face. Adeel knits a sinister plan i.e. the very next morning he apologises to Rana and asks for her forgiveness for his last night's misbehaviour. That afternoon he picks Rana up from college and lies that her mother is very ill and is admitted in the hospital. He takes Raana to a faraway deserted house, arranges for a Maulvi and his friends to help organise a Nikaah, leaving her with a choice to choose between him and her honour. She decides to marry Adeel but vows never to love him. Rana's mother finds out about their 'supposed love' and is shell-shocked. Eventually, Adeel and Rana get married while everybody assumes that they love each other; Adeel tortures Rana. Rana ignores everything Adeel tells her in order to show him where he stands in her life. Adeel suspects that something is going on between Gul-e-Rana and Ashar (Rana's cousin) while Rana just sees Ashar as a brother. Adeel goes to Islamabad. Then Adeel brings Rana to Islamabad with him by lying to his father that he wants Rana to take care of him while he is sick. Adeel continues to be toxic towards Rana. Adeel's friend Mona comes to stay with them. Adeel enters her room at night, grabs her arm and tries to force himself on her. Gul-e-Rana hears Mona's protests and walks into the room, Adeel runs out embarrassed and guilty at being caught.

Rana calls Adeel an animal and Adeel slaps her. Adeel feels guilty but still doesn't make amends or change his behaviour. He continues to call and flirt with Maria and other girls to make Rana jealous. She repeatedly tells him that she is not bothered by his affairs and would appreciate his leaving her alone. She calls Asher Bhai and says she misses him. Adeel and Kamal walk in at this moment and Adeel acts as if Rana has been having an affair with someone else. Kamal gets angry at Rana and asks her to explain but she doesn't try to prove her innocence as she believes that her Taya Abu will not believe her word against his own son. This marks a psychological breaking point for Rana. The next morning Kamal asks Rana to compromise and to make sacrifices for the sake of her marriage with Adeel. He also counsels Adeel unaware that he has been manipulated by him. He heads back to Karachi without taking Rana with him who was supposed to attend Ashar's wedding. A few days later Maria visits Murree with underlying motives. Adeel goes to pick her up. On their way back they enjoy the scenery and take pictures. When they return it is quite late. Adeel discovers that Gul-e-Rana has moved into the guest room. He mocks her and tells her that he plans on marrying Maria to fill up that empty space. Rana congratulates him on this and realises that her marriage is over. Against Gul Bibi's advice, she leaves Murree and returns to Karachi. Meanwhile, Ashar's father meets with an accident and dies. Maria speaks with her mother and reveals that she plans on arm twisting Adeel into marrying her. She calls one of her cousins and asks her to spread the news in the family that she and Adeel are together alone in Murree even though Adeel had moved into a hotel when Gul-e-Rana left. When Adeel's father, Kamal, discovers this, he heads to Murree and is furious with him.

Maria and her mother believe they have succeeded in conspiring to get Adeel married to Maria by falsely alleging that Adeel slept with Maria and claiming that he made promises of marrying her. Adeel visits Ashar's house to take back Rana forcefully. Ashar shows courage and supports Rana. Rana goes into the house with Ashar and Adeel is flabbergasted. Kamal gives Adeel an ultimatum, to marry Maria or to be disinherited. Adeel flees to Murree and Kamal finally begins to suspect Maria and her mother's plans and how strongly Adeel is opposed to this marriage.

Adeel has an accident and is badly injured. Kamal encourages Gul-e-Rana to go to Murree and take care of Adeel as a wife would do. Gul-e-Rana goes to Murree and takes good care of Adeel. She makes sure that Adeel takes all his medicines and eats properly. Adeel's attitude towards Rana begins to change day by day. At first, he makes Rana do all his chores. He even says the difference between a wife and a maid is that a maid takes payment but immediately repents. He finally begins to self reflect about all his past behaviours and deeds.

In time, he asks Rana to stop doing his chores and to spend time with him instead. He asks her to sit and talk to him. Rana replies she has nothing to talk to about and that all his past words have only hurt her. Adeel and Rana’s attitude towards each other slowly begins to change. Adeel finally begins to care for Gul-e-Rana and stops treating her like someone he owns. Meanwhile, Ashar passes away due to cancer and Gul-e-Rana rushes back to Karachi. Gul-e-Rana leaves Adeel for some time and becomes an ordinary teacher. In the end, Adeel becomes a humble and kind guy who often sees Gul-e-Rana in his imaginations and anxiously waits for her to come back. Since Gul-e-Rana and Adeel are still legally married, it is hinted in the end that Gul-E-Rana will eventually come back to Adeel.

== Cast ==
=== Main leads ===
- Sajal Aly as Gul-e-Rana
- Feroze Khan as Adeel

=== Supporting cast ===
- Samina Ahmad as Jazba Aapi
- Rubina Ashraf as Muneera
- Mehmood Akhtar as Kamal Ahmed
- Jinaan Hussain as Maria
- Imran Ashraf as Ashar
- Saleem Mairaj as Zaffri
- Salman Saeed as Umar
- Farah Shah as Shahida
- Humaira Bano as Choti Phuppho
- Sadia Ghaffar as Laila
- Behroze Sabzwari as Abdul Aziz (Special appearance)

== Production ==
=== Development and casting ===
Gul-e-Rana was created by the Six Sigma Plus productions and M.D production's partnership. It was produced by Hum TV's chairman Momina Duraid, and actor and producer Humayun Saeed. Producers hired Farooq Rind for direction, who was the director of channel's famous series Laa.

The screenplay for the serial was written by Samra Bukhari, and the series is based on her novel Hasti ke Ahang. In July 2015, Humayun Saeed and Shehzad Naseeb came on board as co-producers.

The song composition was done by Waqar Ali.

The series was given the 20:00 (PST) time slot and aired on saturday evenings as a part of Duraid's night programming. It was previously decided that the series would replace Jugnoo but post-production delays were held and it was decided that the series would instead replace Duraid's TV series Mol.

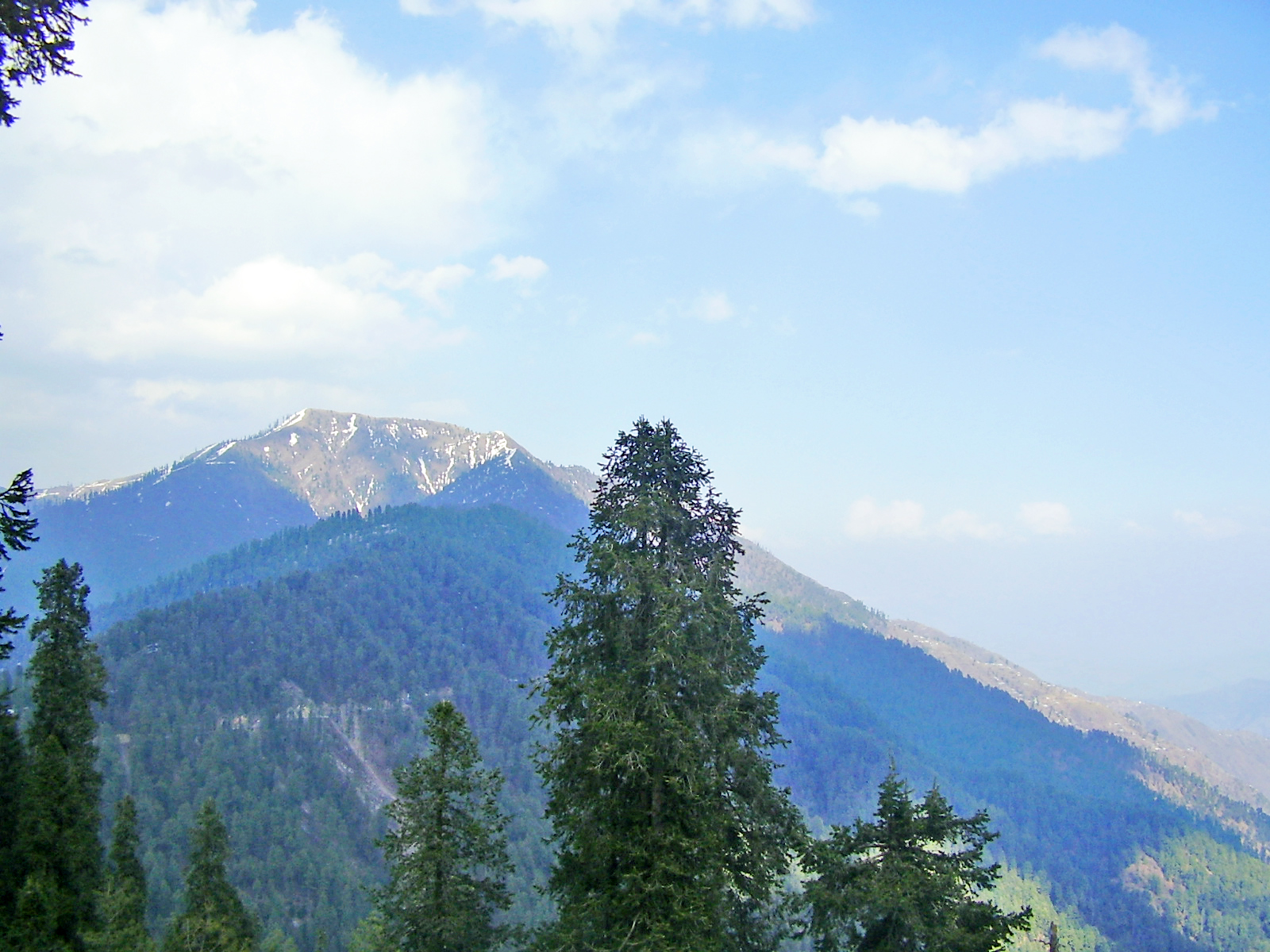
Shooting place

=== Casting ===
Producers mutually chose the cast which includes Sajal Aly, Feroz Khan, Behroze Sabzwari, Mehmood Akhtar, Sundas Tariq and Farah Shah. Sajjal Ali was selected to portray the leading role of Gul-e-Rana opposite Feroz Khan, who was chosen to portray the role of Adeel. The couple marked their second appearance after their series Chup Raho. Behroze Sabzwari and Rubina Ashraf played Aziz and Muneera, Rana's parents, while Farah Shah, Mehmood Akhtar performed the roles of Adeel's parents. Samina Ahmad finalised to portray a negative role along with Saleem Mairaj and Jinaan Hussain. Saadia, who portrayed the role of Laila, was given a role of bold girl first time in her life.

=== Filming ===
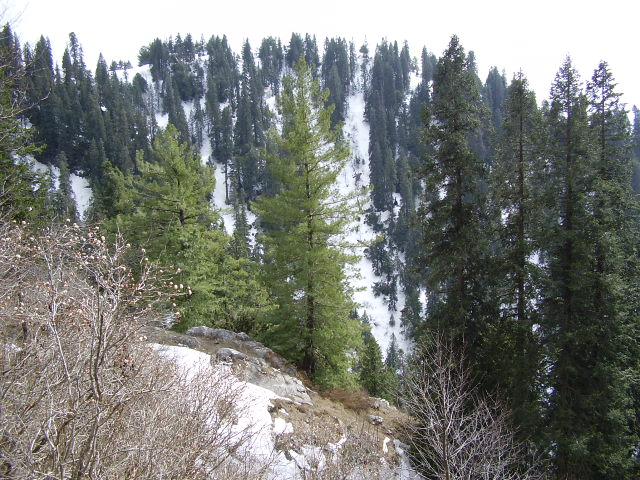
Shooting place for the serial

Shooting began in June 2015 and finished in October 2015, with a total of 21 episodes. Teasers were released in October along with the soundtrack. Shooting was extensively done in hilly areas of Pakistan. The production house divided the filming with half the episodes being shot in Karachi and half being shot in Murree and Nathia Gali. Six Sigma Plus Productions chose scenic areas for posters, teasers and drop back scenes to make the serial more attractive and unique. In early October, Hum TV released promos for the serial which were heavily praised for their shooting locations and cast.

== Release ==
=== Broadcast ===
It aired on 7 November 2015 on Hum TV. It was also aired in Middle East on Hum Mena, in Europe on Hum Europe and in North America, New Zealand etc. on Hum World. All International broadcasting aired the series in accordance with their standard times. On Hum Mena and Hum Europe, it was broadcast twice. It was also aired on the Hum tv's sister channel Hum Sitaray from 5 February 2017 to 25 June 2017

=== Home media and digital release ===
Besides airing on television, its episodes were also uploaded on YouTube which were later deleted. It was also released on iflix as a part of channel's contract with the platform but later on, on terminating the contract in 2019, all the episodes were pulled off and thus had no digital availability to stream. Furthermore, it was also released on the Indian OTT platform Eros Now and in August 2019, it was uploaded on Starzplay to stream online.

== Music ==
Gul-e-Rana OST

Soundtrack album by Waqar Ali
- Released: 1 November 2015
- Recorded: 2014
- Genre: Television soundtrack
- Length: 1:22
- Language: Urdu
- Label: M.D Productions Six Sigma Plus Productions
- Producer: Momina Duraid

The title song of Gul-e-Rana was composed by musician Waqar Ali who also did the background music. The soundtrack consists of songs in Urdu language. Lyrics were written by Sabir Zafar. The lines of the song are frequently used during the course of the show. The original soundtrack was released on 6 November 2015 with the teaser trailer of the serial. The song along with production was produced by Momina Duraid under her production company M.D Productions.

=== Track listing ===
All lyrics are written by Sabir Zafar; all music is composed by Waqar Ali.

No.	Title	Artist(s)	Length
1.	"Man Maney Na"	Waqar Ali	1:55
Total length:			1:55

== Reception ==
=== Critical reception ===
It gathered mostly negative reviews due to its misogynistic, regressive and sexist approach but praised for acting performances of the lead cast.

The Nation criticised the misogynistic approach including a scene when Aly's character blamed a victim of sexual abuse because of her sense of dressing. Buraq Shabbir of The News International criticised the women portrayal in the series but praised the cast performances stating, "Had the performances not been as strong as they were, the play wouldn’t probably have been such a great success." While reviewing for Aaj News, Aruba Adil praised the Aly's character and said that her character which is a damsel in distress is written with a fresh perspective. Reviewers from The Express Tribune also criticised the series' regressive and misogynistic plotline elements.

=== TV ratings ===
The drama series became popular soon after it was released due to its story-line and cast. It made Hum TV the slot leader on Saturdays. Gul-e-Rana achieved record ratings after achieving a TRP of 7.2 as its highest rating (over the 15-minute time slot of 8:30–8:45 pm) on 19 December 2015. Coincidentally, Chup Raho, the first show of Sajal Aly and Feroze Khan, achieved its highest rating of 7.3 TRPs. Gul-e-Rana achieved a TRP of 6.4 (over the 10-minute time slot of 8:50–9:00 pm) on 2 January 2016. Over the 70-minute time slot (8:00–9:10 pm) on the same day, Gul-e-Rana achieved a TRP of 4.7. Once again, Gul-e-Rana achieved exceptional ratings as its 10th episode aired on 9 January 2016, grabbed 6.7 TRPs (over the 10-minute time slot of 8:50–9:00 pm). Over the 70-minute time slot (8:00–9:10 pm) on the same day, Gul-e-Rana achieved a TRP of 4.5. Gul-e-Rana achieved exceptional ratings as its 11th episode aired on 16 January 2016, grabbed 5.2 TRPs (over the 15-minute time slot of 8:45–9:00 pm). Over the 70-minute time slot (8:00–9:10 pm) on the same day, Gul-e-Rana achieved a TRP of 3.6. Then its 15th episode gained extremely high rating which was 7.2. Its 16th episode got a TRP of 6.2. In the last episode, people tweeted about the show so much that it trended on no. 1 spot in an hour. The last episode had a huge amount of ratings with a TRP of 8.8.

== Awards and nominations ==
Year	Award	Date	Category	Recipient(s)	Result	Ref.
2017	Hum Awards	April 29, 2017; 22 July 2017 (televised)	Best Drama Serial (Jury)	Momina Duraid; Six Sigma Plus	Nominated	
2017	Hum Awards	April 29, 2017; 22 July 2017 (televised)	Best Drama Serial - Popular	Momina Duraid; Six Sigma Plus	Nominated	
2017	Hum Awards	April 29, 2017; 22 July 2017 (televised)	Best Director Drama Serial	Farooq Rind	Nominated	
2017	Hum Awards	April 29, 2017; 22 July 2017 (televised)	Best Actor - Jury	Feroze Khan	Nominated	
2017	Hum Awards	April 29, 2017; 22 July 2017 (televised)	Best Actor - popular	Feroze Khan	Nominated	
2017	Hum Awards	April 29, 2017; 22 July 2017 (televised)	Best Actress - Jury	Sajal Aly	Won	
2017	Hum Awards	April 29, 2017; 22 July 2017 (televised)	Best Actor - popular	Sajal Aly	Nominated	
2017	Hum Awards	April 29, 2017; 22 July 2017 (televised)	Best Writer Drama Serial	Samra Bukhari	Nominated	
2017	Hum Awards	April 29, 2017; 22 July 2017 (televised)	Best Onscreen Couple - Popular	Feroze Khan & Sajal Aly	Nominated	
2017	Hum Awards	April 29, 2017; 22 July 2017 (televised)	Best Onscreen Couple (Jury)	Feroze Khan & Sajal Aly	Nominated	
2017	Hum Awards	April 29, 2017; 22 July 2017 (televised)	Best Supporting Actor	Imran Ashraf	Nominated	
2017	Lux Style Awards	April 19, 2017	Best Television Actress	Sajal Ali	Nominated	
