= Sunita Marshall =

Pakistani fashion model and actress

- سنیتا مارشل
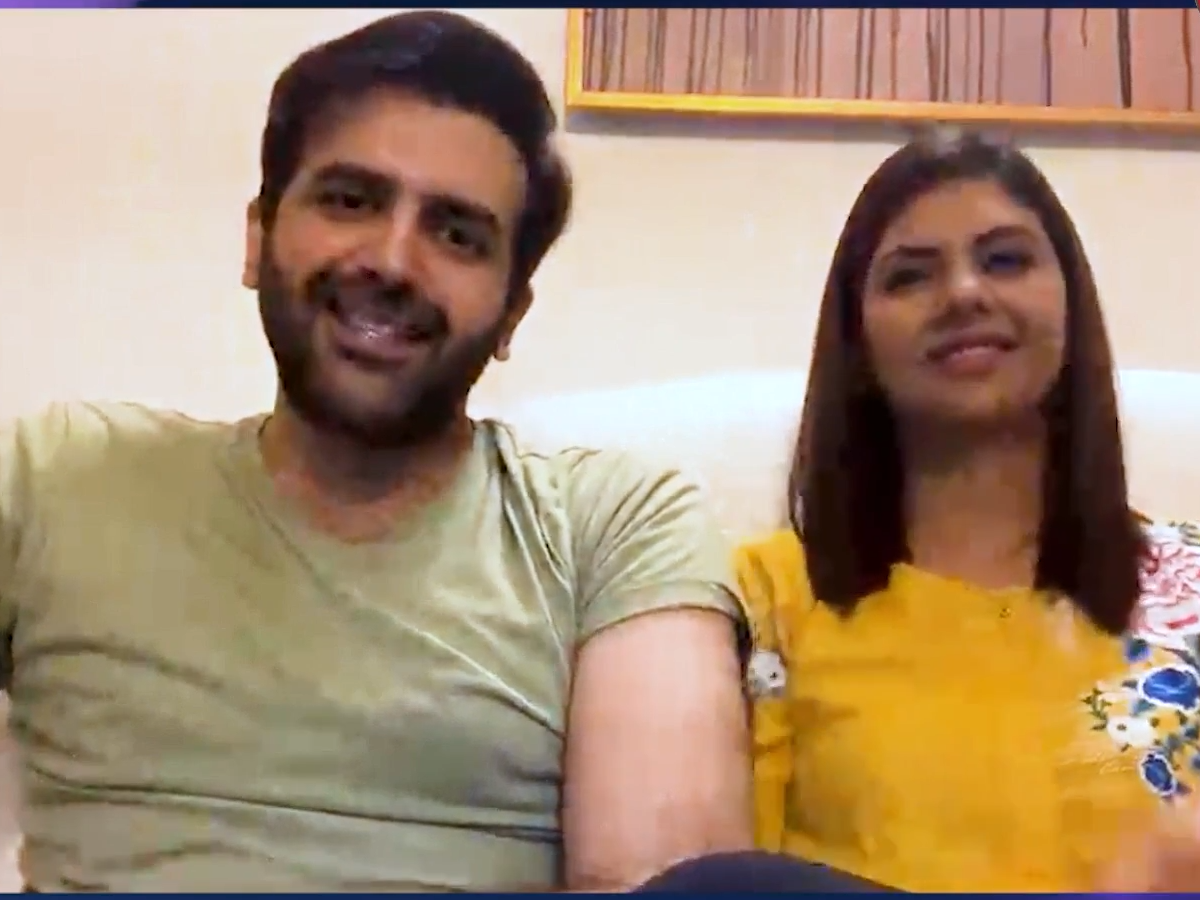
- Marshall (right) in 2022
- Born: 9 April 1981 (age 45); Lahore, Punjab, Pakistan
- Occupations: Actress; Model; Host
- Years active: 2005–present
- Spouse: Hassan Ahmed (m. 2008)
- Children: 2

Sunita Marshall (born 9 April 1981) is a Pakistani fashion model and television actress. She is known for her roles in the political drama series Mera Saaein and the drama series Khuda Aur Muhabbat 3.

== Early life and personal life ==
Marshall was born in Karachi on 9 April 1981. She graduated from St. Patrick's College in commerce. In 2008, she married her co-star and model Hassan Ahmed in an Islamic wedding and a Catholic wedding due to her Christian beliefs. The couple has two children, a boy Raakin Ahmed and a girl named Zynah Ahmed.

== Career ==
In 2017, she played a leading role alongside her husband Ahmed in Geo TV's Mein Akeli.

In 2023, she appeared as a self-sacrificing and innocent daughter-in-law in soap opera Baby Baji, again paired opposite her husband Ahmed.

== Filmography ==
=== Television ===
Year	Series	Role	Network
2005	Shiddat	Sharia	Hum TV
2005-2006	Aashna	Abeer	Geo Entertainment
2007	Suhana	Suhana	ATV
2007	Thori Door Sath Chalo	Saira	Hum TV
2007	Malika	Malika	Hum TV
2008	Chubhan	Zarmina	PTV Home
2008	Tair e Lahoti	Mahnoor	Hum TV
2009	Tum Jo Miley	Kiran	Hum TV
2009	Bulbulay	Nazar	ARY Digital
2009	Phir Kho Jaye Na	Sherry	ARY Digital
2009	Aasman Choonay Do	Hania	Geo Entertainment
2010	Sandal	Sahiba	Geo Entertainment
2010	Meray Naseeb Ki Barishain	Sobia	ARY Digital
2010	Bahu Rani	Lubna	ARY Digital
2010	Wafa Kaisi Kahan Ka Ishq	Nida	Hum TV
2010-2011	Qaid-e-Tanhai	Anila	Hum TV
2010-2011	Mera Saaein	Shazmeen	ARY Digital
2011	Aey Ishq Hamain Barbaad Na Kar	Shiza	ARY Digital
2011	Mere Sanwariya Ka Naam	Dureen	ARY Digital
2011	Mohabbat Rooth Jaye Toh	Bhaag Bari	Hum TV
2012	Mera Saaein 2	Shazmeen	ARY Digital
2012	Aik Khuwab Aik Haqeeqat	Jia	A-Plus TV
2012-2013	Sitamgar	Zahra	Hum TV
2014	Rukhsati	Maleeha	Geo Entertainment
2015	Agar Ho Sakay Tou	Manal	Urdu1
2016	Naimat	Sara	ARY Digital
2016	Dil-e-Beqarar	Shehla	Hum TV
2017	Main Akeli	Zara	Geo Entertainment
2018	Khalish	Nageen	Geo Entertainment
2018	Ghamand	Shaheena	A-Plus TV
2018	Dhund	Samina	TV One Pakistan
2021	Aulaad	Afreen	ARY Digital
2021	Khuda Aur Muhabbat 3	Sahiba	Geo Entertainment
2021	Mohabbat Daagh Ki Surat	Saba	Geo Entertainment
2022	Dil Zaar Zaar	Shahpara	Geo Entertainment
2022	Pinjra	Wajiha	ARY Digital
2023	Sar-e-Rah	Mizna	ARY Digital
2023	Baby Baji	Asma	ARY Digital
2023	Ghao	Khalda	PTV Home
2023	Mein Kahani Hun	Bisma	Express Entertainment
2023	Namak Haram	Malaika	Hum TV
2024	Dayan	Alia	Express Entertainment
2024	Mohabbat Satrangi	Maria	Green Entertainment
2025	Sher	Samra	ARY Digital
2026	Maa	Tara	Green Entertainment
2026	Rang De	Nudrat	Geo Entertainment
2026	Deewar	Sadiya	Hum TV

=== Anthology Series ===
Year	Series	Role	Network	Notes
2012	Kitni Girhain Baaki Hain	Sara	Hum TV	Episode "Baazi Gar"
2013	Shadi Ka Laddu	Marina	Express Entertainment	Episode "Love You Hamesha"
2020	Haqeeqat	Sughra	A-Plus TV	Episode 6 "Sahab Jee"
2021	Oye Motti	Humaira	Express Entertainment	Episode "8"
2022	Aitraaf	Razia	Aan TV	Episode "Ghari"
2024	BOL Kahani	unannounced	BOL Network	

=== Telefilm ===
Year	Title	Role	Network
2020	Shaadi Ka Rona	Ammara	ARY Digital

=== Other appearances ===
- Jago Pakistan Jago
- Nestle Nido Young Stars (2015)
- Iftar Mulaqat (2016)
- Mazaaq Raat (2017)
- Music video of "Preeto", by Abrar ul Haq (2002)

== Awards and nominations ==
- 4th Hum Awards - Hum Award for Best Model Female
