= Mera Saaein =

2010-11 Pakistani television series

- Genre: Drama; Political drama
- Inspired by: "My Fedual Lord" by Tehmina Durrani
- Written by: Samira Fazal
- Directed by: Babar Javed
- Starring: See below
- Theme music composer: Waqar Ali
- Opening theme: Mera Saaein by Zulfiqar Ali and Shabana Kauser
- Country of origin: Pakistan
- Original language: Urdu
- No. of seasons: 2
- No. of episodes: 27

Production
- Producers: Asif Raza Mir; Babar Javed
- Camera setup: Multi-camera setup
- Running time: 38 minutes
- Production company: A & B Entertainment

Original release
- Network: ARY Digital
- Release: 21 November 2010 – 22 May 2011

Mera Saaein (transl. My Lord) is a Pakistani political drama aired on ARY Digital. It was directed by Babar Javed, produced by A & B Entertainment and written by Samira Fazal. The cast features Nauman Ijaz, Savera Nadeem, Aamina Sheikh, Beenish Chohan and Sunita Marshall in leading roles. Mera Saaein was one of the year's most commercially successful programs and was followed by a sequel the following year. However, critics also called it as "misogynistic".

== Plot ==
Mera Saaein focuses on the life of a feudal lord, Malik Wajahat Ali, whose incessant pursuit of a male heir has ruined the life of many women. While he possesses much influence over the lives of others, he finds himself still desperate for a son.

Mera Saaein is the story of a traditional feudal lord and politician with insatiable desires of women, power and wealth. It is also a story of a non-resident Pakistani girl, Shazmeen who lived and studied in the UK, does not have any siblings but has a best friend Naina who she met in UK. Shazmeen married Wajahat when she is incorrectly inspired by his fake political agenda and sees an opportunity to accomplish her aspirations of bringing a positive change in society through Wajahat's political party. Because of Wajahat, through the course of the series, the two best friends Shazmeen and Naina drift apart and become hardcore enemies and rivals.

Malik Wajahat, who has had 6 still births with his 1st wife Naima, and 5 daughters from two other secretive marriages, is desperate for a son. He has already divorced the secretive 2nd wife and has sent her and her three kids away. He makes the secretive 3rd wife go through an abortion, divorces her and sends her and the 2 daughters away when he finds out that the gender of the unborn child is a female. Now he is on hunt for a 4th wife and is simultaneously carrying out an affair with the maid, Zeenat.

When he meets the UK returned Shazmeen, he is instantly attracted and tricks her into falling in love with him and breaking off her engagement to marry him. When the maid announces she is pregnant, Malik Wajahat forces her to go through an abortion and dumps her, but she remains obsessed for his affections.

Over time, Shazmeen produces 3 daughters and discovers Malik Wajahat's past and true face and the marriage deteriorates. First wife, Naima is poisoned and killed by the jealous maid Zeenat, and Malik Wajahat murders Zeenat when he discovers her intentions to kill Shazmeen as well.

After he grows tired of Shazmeen and still has desire for a son (after abandoning 8 daughters, and forcing multiple abortions), his eyes fall on Shazmeen's best friend Naina, who needs shelter at their home in order to secure divorce from her abusive husband Farhad.

To satisfy his desire, Malik Wajahat has Farhad murdered and tricks Naina into a secretive marriage. This drives the rivalry between Shazmeen and Naina when she discovers the secret marriage and the fact that Naina is pregnant with a boy.

At the end, Shazmeen's ultimate revenge comes with convincing Naina to have an abortion to forever free herself from Malik Wajahat and sending Naina and her kids to US, poisoning and killing Malik Wajahat and telling him that the son he yearned for has been aborted and taking over his business, money, property and political party.

== Series overview ==
=== Season 1 ===
Mera Saaein focuses on the life of a feudal lord and politician, Malik Wajahat Ali whose insatiable desire of women/power/wealth and incessant pursuit of a male heir has ruined the life of many women. While he possesses much influence over the lives of others, he finds himself still desperate for a son. It is also a story of Shazmeen who lived and studied in the UK and married Wajahat with a desire to try to change things for the better. Because of the Wajahat, two best friends Shazmeen and Naina are drifted apart and become bitter enemies and rivals.

=== Season 2 ===
Meera Saaein 2 takes a complete turn from being a behind closed doors personal story of a feudal lord/politician to being a charged political drama about political parties, corruption and their members hungry for power. The surviving wives of Malik Wajahat, Shazmeen and Naina, have become enemies. Under the influence of their new husbands, and their grown children they are determined to destroy each other. With the return of Malik Wajhat's & Naina's son (Malik Shazmaan Wajahad Hayyat), and introduction of Malik Wajahat's & Shahzmeen's daughter (Inaya) the hopes and dreams of all involved are put to the test and revenge is in the air.

== Cast ==
- Noman Ijaz as Malik Wajahat
- Savera Nadeem as Naima Malik
- Aamina Sheikh as Naina Malik
- Sunita Marshall as Shazmeen Malik
- Beenish Chohan as Zeenat
- Faisal Qureshi as Aarish
- Mohib Mirza as Farhad
- Saba Faisal as Wajahat's sister

== Soundtrack ==
Its title song was sung by Zulfiqar Ali and Shabana Kauser, lyrics by Ali Moin and composed by Waqar Ali.

== Sequel ==
In 2012, Babar Javed directed the sequel of the show known as Mera Saaein 2. Except for Aamina Sheikh and Sunita Marshall the cast was new. It focused on the rivalry between Naina (Aamina Sheikh) and Shazmeen (Sunita Marshall) who are supposed to be best friends at one time but later fight for political powers along with their respective husbands played by Waseem Abbas and Shahood Alvi. The cast also included Fahad Mustafa along with Mahnoor Baloch, Ayeza Khan, Zhalay Sarhadi and Anoushay Abbasi.

== Accolades ==
=== Lux Style Awards ===
- Best TV Play (Satellite)-Won
- Best TV Actor (Satellite)-Noman Ijaz-Nominated
- Best TV Actress (Satellite)-Beenish Chohan-Nominated
- Best TV Director-Babar Javed-Nominated
- Best TV Writer-Samira Fazal-Nominated
