= Fahad Rehmani =

Pakistani actor and director

- فہد رحمانی
- Occupations: Actor; director
- Years active: 2006–present
- Known for: Bilqees Urf Bitto (2016); Dhund (2017); Tere Bina (2017); Khalish (2018)
- Spouse: Laila Wasti
- Family: Rizwan Wasti (father-in-law); Tahira Wasti (mother-in-law); Maria Wasti (cousin-in-law)

Fahad Rehmani (Urdu: فہد رحمانی) is a Pakistani actor and director of television dramas. He first gained recognition through the television series Dhund (2017) and Khalish (2018).

== Filmography ==
=== Television ===
List of performances and appearances by Fahad Rehmani in television
Year	Title	Role	Channel	Director	Notes
2017	Khuda Aur Muhabbat	Sajjad Amjad Raza	Geo Entertainment		
2017	Teri Meri Kahani	Omaid	A-Plus TV	Yes	
2017	Tere Bina	Umar	Geo Entertainment		
2017	Bedardi Saiyaan		Geo Entertainment		
2017	Bilqees Urf Bitto	Sikandar	Urdu 1		
2017	Dhund The Mystery	Kashif	TV One		
2017	Be Inteha		Urdu 1		
2017	Mera Haq	Waqar	Geo Entertainment	Yes	
2018	Khalish	Aurangzeb	Geo Entertainment		
2018	Bay Dardi	Asim	ARY Digital		
