= Malika-e-Aliya =

- Title screen
- Genre: Family, Thriller
- Written by: Nadia Akhtar
- Directed by: Syed Asim Ali
- Starring: Maria Wasti
- Opening theme: Malika-e-Aliya
- Country of origin: Pakistan
- Original language: Urdu
- No. of seasons: 2
- No. of episodes: 83

Production
- Executive producer: Sam (Media World UAE)
- Producers: A&B Entertainment
- Running time: 60 minutes

Original release
- Network: Geo TV
- Release: 8 April 2014 – 5 May 2015

Malika-e-Aliya (Urdu: ملکہ عالیہ) is a 2014 Pakistani drama serial directed by Syed Asim Ali and written by Nadia Akhtar. It is a production of A&B Entertainment. The drama was first aired 8 April 2014, on Geo Entertainment but due to a ban on the channel, only 10 episodes could be shown. From 8 September 2014, it was continued with new episodes, the first day after the ban was lifted on the channel. Malika-e-Aliya is the story of Alia and her evil plans to become the sole owner of her in-laws' wealth, and the act that she puts on to convince everyone in the Baig household that all she wants is to provide them the same home and its comfort which their mother and Mr. Baig’s late wife once provided them with.

== Plot ==
Malika (Maria Wasti) is a woman with unique desire unlike women. Mr. Baig, (Sohail Asghar) who plays Malika’s father in-law along with his three sons, wants a simple yet loving and responsible daughter in-law, as Baig’s wife died a long time ago and the household is in a great need for a feminine touch and Malika puts on an act as if she is the very woman they are looking for. Mr. Baig selects Alia to be his eldest son Furqan’s (Sohail Sameer) wife as he believed that she is from a middle class background and is well equipped with all the merits and virtues required to manage a home. Nouman, Mr. Baig's second son, loved a girl but Baig decided that Malika will choose his next daughter in-law. Nouman told Malika about his love and took her to the girl's house. The girl told Malika about herself and Malika thought that the girl is even more educated and intelligent than her. So Malika's importance will be less so, Malika made an excuse and chose Khadija (Yasra Rizvi) from a poor family. She made her do all the household chores. Khadija uses to do the chores thinking that Malika did a favour on her that she made her marry a good person. Nouman didn't like Khadija at all but he tried to accept her.

Baig decided to name the house after Malika, she heard it and was full of joy. Later, Malika found out that she is pregnant and she believed that she will give birth to a baby boy. But she couldn't believe when her mother told her that it's a girl. She named the baby Rida (Arisha Razi). Later then, Khadija was pregnant too. Malika was worried that if the baby would be a boy, then Khadija's baby will have the whole property of the family so, Malika asked her mother to give a medicine for Khadija's baby to die. So she got it and mixed it in the tea. There was one tea for Baig and one for Khatija so by mistake, Baig drinks the tea .

== Cast ==
- Maria Wasti as Malika Aliya
- Anoushay Abbasi as Chanda
- Sohail Asghar as Anwar Baig
- Shahzad Raza as Haji Sahab
- Sohail Sameer as Furqan Baig
- Faiq Khan as Noman Baig
- Yasra Rizvi as Khatija
- Afshan Qureshi as Kishwar
- Gul-e-Rana as Rahat
- Ahmad Zeb as Salman
- Farah Nadeem as Surraya
- Zuhab Khan as Umer
- Beena Chaudhary as Rani
- Arisha Razi as Rida
- Nazli Nasr as Sultana
- Birjees Farooqui as Malika's aunt
- Sumbul Shahid as Malika's khala

== Series overview ==
Season	No. of episodes	Originally broadcast (Pakistan)	
Season	No. of episodes	First episode	Last episode
1	57	8 April 2014	6 January 2015
2	26	5 February 2015	5 May 2015

=== Release ===
Country	Channel	First aired	Last aired
Pakistan	Geo TV	8 April 2014	5 May 2015
India	Zindagi	11 May 2016	18 July 2016
