= Veena (TV series) =

Pakistani television series

- Promotional poster for Veena by ARY Zauq
- Urdu: وینا
- Written by: Fizzah Jaffri
- Directed by: Syed Atif Hussain
- Starring: Fahad Mustafa; Danish Taimoor; Abid Ali; Javeria Abbasi; Beenish Chohan; Shabbir Jan
- Country of origin: Pakistan
- Original language: Urdu
- No. of episodes: 20

Production
- Camera setup: Multi-camera

Original release
- Network: ARY Digital
- Release: 2009 – 2009

Veena is a Pakistani television series starring Fahad Mustafa in the title role as a eunuch, who struggles for the welfare of their community. Danish Taimoor features as the normal lead. The supporting cast includes Abid Ali, Beenish Chohan, Javeria Abbasi, Shabbir Jan and Nauman Masood. It was directed by Syed Atif Hussain and first broadcast on ARY Digital in 2009.

Mustafa's performance in the series was met with critical acclaim, and is marked as his first breakthrough. The series received two nominations at the 9th Lux Style Awards, including Best TV Actor for Mustafa and Best TV Writer.

== Plot summary ==
The plot focuses on society's attitude towards the queer people and revolves around the struggle of Veena, a eunuch who wants to get due rights of their community as human beings.

== Cast ==
- Fahad Mustafa as Veena / Murad
- Danish Taimoor as Najam
- Abid Ali as Munna
- Beenish Chohan as Fazi
- Javeria Abbasi as Shazi
- Hina Dilpazir as Shamsa
- Shagufta Ejaz as Sajida
- Hassan Ahmed as Wahaj
- Tamanna as Munna's mother
- Tehreem Zuberi as Erum
- Badar Khalil as Mehar Sadaf
- Nauman Masood as Qasim
- Mehmood Aslam as Guru
- Shabbir Jan
- Nadia Hussain
- Zara Farooq

== Production ==
Veena was conceived by Atif Hussain, with Danish Taimoor in lead role and Fahad Mustafa in a guest appearance that eventually developed into the title role. . It was then chose to limit Mustafa's appearances to 45 scenes in 20 episodes, so that it would make his character more digestible to the audience and prevent overwhelming them with his presence.

The principal photography for the series took place in the Interior Sindh.

== Accolades ==
Year	Award	Category	Recipient(s)/ nominee(s)	Result	Ref.
2010	Lux Style Awards	Best Television Actor - Satellite	Fahad Mustafa	Nominated	
2010	Lux Style Awards	Best Television Writer	Fizzah Jaffri	Nominated	
