= Kanwar Arsalan =

Pakistani television actor and a model

- Born: Kanwar Arsalan; 27 October 1985 (age 40); Karachi, Pakistan
- Occupations: Actor, Model
- Years active: 2008–present
- Spouse: Fatima Effendi (m. 2012)

Kanwar Arsalan (Urdu: کنور ارسلان; born 27 October 1985) is a Pakistani television actor and model.

== Career ==
Kanwar started his career as a model but later turned to acting in serials. He made his acting debut in Tum Jo Miley. After that he appeared in Pul Siraat, Talluq, Ta'air-e-Lahoti, Kuch Unkahi Batien, Tum jo Milay, Bahu Rani, Haryalay Bannay, Larkiyan Mohallay Ki, Mere Sanwariya Ka Naam, Merey Khuwab Reza Reza, Palki, Khuab Ankhein Khwaish Chehray, and Meri Saheli Meri Hamjoli.

== Personal life ==
Kanwar is married to the actress and model Fatima Effendi since 2012. The couple have two children, Almir and Mahbir.

== Television ==
=== Television ===
Year	Title	Role	Ref(s)
	Khwaab Ankhein Khwahish Chehre		
2008	Tair-e-Lahooti		
2009	Tum Jo Miley	Fawad	
2010	Larkiyan Mohallay Ki		
2010	Bahu Rani		
2010	Kuch Ankahi Baatein		
2010	Aurat Ka Ghar Konsa		
2011	Mere Saanwariya Ka Naam		
2011	Meray Khwab Raiza Raiza		
2011	Palki		
2011	Humsafar	Raza	
2012	Meri Saheli Meri Humjoli		
2012	Haryali Bannay		
2013-2015	Choti Choti Khushiyan	Kashif	
2014	Do Qadam Door Thay	Raza	
2014-2015	Agar Tum Na Hotay		
2015	Mere Khuda	Babar	
2015	Shukrana		
2016	Joru Ka Ghulam		
2016	Bechari Mehrunnisa		
2016	Chahat Hui Tere Naam	Fareed	
2017	Chandni Begum	Sahir	
2021	Khugharziyan	Taimur	

=== Other appearances ===
Year	Title	Role	Ref(s)
	Kitni Girhain Baaki Hain		
	Talluq		
2015	Madventures		

== Telefilm ==
- Shadi Ka Larka
- Valentine's Day Ka Phool
- Khaala Garam Masala
