= Daku Raaj =

- Daku Raj
- Directed by: Idrees Khan
- Written by: Nasir Adib
- Produced by: Nasir Adib, Hassan Saleem
- Starring: Sultan Rahi; Javed Sheikh; Neeli; Ghulam Mohiuddin; Saima; Afshan Qureshi; Bahar Begum; Humayun Qureshi
- Cinematography: Ghazanfar Ali
- Music by: Wajahat Attre
- Distributed by: International films
- Release date: 12 June 1992 (Pakistan)
- Running time: 150 minutes
- Country: Pakistan
- Language: Punjabi

Daku Raj Punjabi film (ڈاکو راج) is a 1992 Pakistani action film. Directed by Idrees Khan, written and produced by Nasir Adeeb. The film starring Sultan Rahi, Javed Sheikh, Neeli, Afshan Qureshi, Ghulam Mohiuddin.

== Track list ==
Film's music soundtrack was composed by the musician Wajahat Attre, with song lyrics by Waris Ludhianvi and sung by Noor Jehan.

Title	Singer(s)
"Ek Lamha Nae Rah Sakdi"	Noor Jehan
"Gulbadni Badan Mera"	Noor Jehan
Kangan Sataye Kabhi Bindya	Noor Jehan
Toun Meri Jaan Mein Tere	Noor Jehan
