= Tootay Huway Per =

- Title card
- Also known as: Khwahishein
- Genre: Soap opera
- Written by: Seema Munaf
- Directed by: Mohsin Mirza
- Starring: Ayeza Khan; Anoushay Abbasi; Mohib Mirza; Sami Khan; Esha Noor; (For entire cast see the section on cast below)
- Opening theme: Tootey Huwey Per sung by Tina Sani
- Country of origin: Pakistan
- Original language: Urdu
- No. of episodes: 112

Production
- Producers: Asif Raza Mir; Babar Javed
- Production locations: Karachi, Pakistan
- Running time: Approx. 16-20 minutes
- Production company: A&B Entertainment

Original release
- Network: Geo Entertainment
- Release: 11 April – 22 December 2011

Tootey Huwey Per (Urdu: ٹوٹے ہوے پر , lit. 'Broken wings') is a 2011 Pakistani soap television series broadcast on Geo Entertainment. It was directed by Mohsin Mirza and produced by Asif Raza Mir and Babar Javed under the banner A&B Entertainment.

It was also telecast on Zindagi TV channel in India as Khwahishein, airing from 7 January 2015 to 4 May 2015.

== Plot ==
The heart-rending story of a simple middle-class family and their dreams and aspirations. Ajiya and Nimra are the daughters of a hard-working, lower-middle-class, Sibghatullah and his wife Zainab. A man of immense dignity and integrity, Sibghatullah has always managed to provide for his five children and wife within his very modest means.

However, as the story unfolds Ajiya and Nimra take two very different paths in life.

For Ajiya, money is everything and her one aim in life is to be rich. For Nimra, safeguarding her parents’ integrity is of utmost importance, even if it comes at the expense of her happiness. Set against the backdrop of age-old culture, tradition and the harsh realities of living in an extended family, this is a soap which will throw light on the pressures of living in materialistic times.

== Cast ==
- Ayeza Khan as Ajiya
- Anoushay Abbasi as Nimra, Ajiya's younger sister
- Seema Seher as Zainab, Ajiya's and Nimra's Mother
- Khalid Zafar as Sibghatullah, Ajiya & Nimra's Father
- Qaiser Naqvi as Dadi, Ajiya and NImra's grandmother; Sibghatullah's mother
- Mohib Mirza as Sameer, Ajiya & Nimra's Cousin
- Sami Khan as Zayeem, Ajiya & Nimra's Cousin
- Hassan Ahmed as Aun/Junaid
- Sajid Hussain Shah as Sadakat, Ajiya and Nimra's uncle; Sibghatullah's younger brother
- Nausheen Ibrahim as Farhat, Sameer's Sister
- Akhtar Hasnain as Ajiya's brother
- Ayesha Gul as Saima, Ajiya and Nimra's sister-in-law
- Esha Noor as Farzana
