= Missing Darling =

2026 Pakistani television series

- Genre: Crime thriller
- Written by: Yasir Hussain
- Directed by: Yasir Hussain; Yasir Taj
- Starring: Yasir Hussain; Mohib Mirza; Nausheen Shah
- Country of origin: Pakistan
- Original language: Urdu
- No. of seasons: 1
- No. of episodes: 15

Original release
- Network: Express Entertainment
- Release: 5 April – 12 July 2026

Missing Darling is a 2026 Pakistani crime thriller television series directed and written by Yasir Hussain and Yasir Taj. The series stars Yasir Hussain, Mohib Mirza and Nausheen Shah. It was broadcast on Express Entertainment.

== Plot ==
The series follows the disappearance of Naina Kashif, a social media personality known as Darling. The case is assigned to Inspector Sajid, who investigates the circumstances surrounding her disappearance. As the investigation progresses, further incidents and emerging clues reveal connections between several individuals. The narrative also explores crime, professional rivalries and aspects of Pakistan's entertainment industry.

== Cast ==
- Yasir Hussain as Inspector Sajid
- Mareeha Safdar as Naina Kashif, also known as Darling
- Mohib Mirza
- Nausheen Shah
- Umer Aalam
- Kiran Ashfaque

== Production ==
In March 2026, Daily Jang reported that Yasir Hussain was working on a television project titled Missing Darling, which was scheduled to air on Express Entertainment.

The series marked the return of the character Inspector Sajid, previously portrayed by Hussain in the television drama Aik Thi Laila.

== Episodes ==
=== Season 1 ===
The first season consists of 15 episodes. The series concluded its run in July 2026.

== Reception ==
In its coverage of the series' conclusion, The Express Tribune described Missing Darling as a departure from conventional Pakistani family dramas. The publication highlighted its combination of police investigations, suspense, entertainment-industry themes and social commentary. It also noted positive reactions from viewers who appreciated its crime-focused narrative.
