= Khalish =

2018 Pakistani television series

- Genre: Family drama Revenge; Thriller
- Written by: Imran Ali Safir
- Directed by: Syed Ali Raza Usama
- Starring: Faisal Qureshi; Asif Raza Mir; Sunita Marshall
- Country of origin: Pakistan
- Original language: Urdu
- No. of episodes: 29

Production
- Producer: Aijaz Aslam
- Production location: Pakistan
- Running time: Approx 40 Minutes
- Production companies: Ice Media & Entertainment

Original release
- Network: Geo Entertainment
- Release: 14 February – 19 August 2018

Khalish is a 2018 Pakistani drama serial directed by Syed Ali Raza Usama, produced by Aijaz Aslam, and written by Imran Ali Safir. The drama stars Faisal Qureshi, Asif Raza Mir and Sunita Marshall as the main leads. The serial premiered on 14 February 2018 and ran until 19 August on Geo Entertainment. It first aired every Wednesday, then Saturday, and finally Sunday at 8:00 PM.

== Cast ==
- Faysal Qureshi as Saahil, Altamash and Mumtaz's son
- Aliya Ali as Pareesa
- Sunita Marshall as Nageen, Akhlaq's daughter, Saahil's love interest, Feroz's wife
- Kamran Jilani as Feroz, Altamash's on, Saahil's half-brother, Nageen's husband
- Asif Raza Mir as Altamash, father of Saahil, Feroze and Rimsha
- Tanveer Jamal as Ikhlaq, Nageen's father
- Zainab Qayyum as Mumtaz, Saahil's mother
- Jahanara Hai as Mukhtar Begum, Altamash's mother
- Faraz Farooqui as Bezaad
- Sana Humayou as Seemi
- Dania Enwer as Rimsha
- Fahad Rehmani as Aurangzaib
- Tabriz Ali Shah as Rohaan
- Salma Shaheen as Pareesa's mother
- Sohail Khan as Ashfaq
- Salahuddin Tunio as Jabbar Lakhi
- Manoj Kumar as Noman
- Amna Malik as Tabinda
- Zaheen Tahira as Neelofar's mother-in-law
- Ismat Zaidi as Tehmina
- Tabbasum Arif as Neelofar
- Mariam Mirza as Afshan

== Production ==
Khalish was initially titled as Bewafa but the name was changed later. This serial marks the return of the Bashar Momin director Syed Ali Raza Usama, and Faysal Qureshi. It is produced under the banner of Aijaz Aslam's production house, Ice Media & Entertainment.
