= Saad Qureshi =

Saad Qureshi may refer to:

- Saad Qureshi (actor)
- Saad Qureshi (artist)
