= Agar Tum Na Hotay =

2014 Pakistani drama serial aired on Hum TV

- Genre: Soap series Romantic; Family drama
- Written by: Gazala Aziz
- Directed by: Fahim Burney
- Starring: Saniya Shamshad; Kanwar Arsalan; Hassan Ahmed; Uroosa Qureshi; Mariam Ansari; Naeema Garaj
- Country of origin: Pakistan
- Original language: Urdu
- No. of episodes: 89

Production
- Producers: Momina Duraid; Gemstone Production
- Production location: Karachi
- Camera setup: Multi-camera setup
- Running time: 20 minutes

Original release
- Network: Hum TV
- Release: 4 August 2014 – 6 January 2015

Agar Tum Na Hotay (Urdu: اگر تم نہ ہوتے, lit. 'Had You Not Been There') is a 2014 Pakistani television series that aired on Hum TV. It is directed by Fahim Burney and written by Gazala Aziz. The series was produced by Syed Afzal Ali at Mushroom Productions. It starred Saniya Shamshad, Kanwar Arsalan and Hassan Ahmed in pivot roles. At 3rd Hum Awards series was nominated Best Soap Actor for Hassan Ahmed, Best Soap Actress for Saniya Shamshad and Best Soap Series for Syed Afzal Ali.

== Cast ==
- Saniya Shamshad as Sania
- Kanwar Arsalan
- Hassan Ahmed
- Shaheen Khan as Shakra
- Uroosa Qureshi
- Mariam Ansari
- Naeema Garaj
- Yasir Shuro
- Hira Mani

== Accolades ==
At 3rd Hum Awards soap was nominated for following nominations:

- Best Soap Actor - Hassan Ahmed (nom)
- Best Soap Actress - Saniya Shamshad (nom)
- Best Soap Series - Syed Afzal Ali (nom)
