= Hina Rizvi =

Pakistani actress

- Born: Shermeen Rizvi; Lahore, Punjab, Pakistan
- Education: University of Westminster
- Occupation: Actress
- Years active: 2003 – present
- Spouse: Ammar Ahmed Khan (m. 2024; sep. 2025)
- Relatives: Sangeeta (sister); Kaveeta (sister); Jiah Khan (niece)

Hina Rizvi is a Pakistani actress. She is known for her roles in Urdu TV dramas Tishnagi Dil Ki, Umeed, Hari Hari Churiyaan, Neeli Zinda Hai and Quddusi Sahab Ki Bewah.

== Early life ==
Hina was born in Lahore, Pakistan. She completed her studies from England's University of Westminster. Hina's mother Mehtab Rizvi was a screenwriter and producer and her father Tayyab Hussain Rizvi was a producer.

== Career ==
Hina made her debut as an actress on PTV's sitcom Shortcut in 2003 opposite Faysal Qureshi. She was noted for her roles in the dramas Main Soteli, Babul Ki Duayen Leti Ja, Yehi Hai Zindagi, Yehi Hai Zindagi Season 2, Aap Ko Kya Takleef Hai and Jaltay Khwab. She also appeared in dramas Ullu Baraye Farokht Nahi, Kalmoohi, Rishton Ki Dor, Bunty I Love You, and Quddusi Sahab Ki Bewah. Since then she has appeared in dramas Tere Bina, Mehram, Tishnagi Dil Ki and Umeed. She also appeared in movies Ishq Positive, Balu Mahi and Halla Gulla.

== Personal life ==
Hina's elder sisters Sangeeta and Kaveeta are both actresses. Hina's older brother Raza Ali Rizvi was a producer. She is also the aunt of British-American actress Jiah Khan. In 2024 she married actor Ammar Ahmed Khan. In August 2025, she officially announced their separation.

== Filmography ==
=== Television ===
Year	Title	Role	Network
2003	Shortcut	Najma	PTV
2011	Dil Behkay Ga	Javi Begum	PTV
2011	Kountry Luv	Naheed	A-Plus
2012	Shashlik Xtra Hot	Munni	Geo TV
2012	Quddusi Sahab Ki Bewah	Rizwana	ARY Digital
2013	Kalmoohi	Khairan	Geo TV
2013	Ullu Baraye Farokht Nahi	Fatima	Hum TV
2013	Main Soteli	Fouzia	Urdu 1
2014	Babul Ki Duayen Leti Ja	Nighat	ARY Digital
2014	Bunty I Love You	Mehnaz	Hum TV
2014	Bashar Momin	Zafar's wife	Geo Entertainment
2014	Mehram	Habiba	Hum TV
2015	Rishton Ki Dor	Sofia	Geo Entertainment
2015	Yehi Hai Zindagi	Safina	Express Entertainment
2015	Iss Khamoshi Ka Matlab	Yasmeen	Geo TV
2015	Murada Mai	Mona	Urdu 1
2016	Mannchali	Nasreen	Geo TV
2016	Yehi Hai Zindagi Season 2	Safina	Express Entertainment
2016	Mera Yaar Miladay	Bibbo Begum	ARY Digital
2017	Tere Bina	Nazia	Geo Entertainment
2017	Jannat	Atif's mother	A-Plus
2017	Champa Aur Chambeli	Kami's mother	Geo Entertainment
2017	Tishnagi Dil Ki	Naima	Geo TV
2017	Hari Hari Churiyaan	Guddi	Geo Entertainment
2018	Aap Ko Kya Takleef Hai	Babra	BOL Entertainment
2018	Mirchiyan	Farheen	BOL Entertainment
2018	Jaltay Khwab	Raeesa	Express Entertainment
2019	Mera Qasoor	Nasreen	ARY Digital
2019	Bulbulay Season 2	Shumaila	ARY Digital
2020	Umeed	Mrs. Bilgrami	Geo Entertainment
2021	Pehli Si Muhabbat	Bushra's mother	ARY Digital
2021	Neeli Zinda Hai	Shaista	ARY Digital
2021	Shatranj	Bakhtawar	TV One
2021	Sirat-e-Mustaqeem	Fatima	ARY Digital
2021	Bebasi	Azra	Hum TV
2021	Mein Hari Piya	Javeria	ARY Digital
2022	Hum Tum	Nargis	Hum TV
2022	Sirat-e-Mustaqeem Season 2	Neelam's aunt	ARY Digital
2022	Habs	Bobby	ARY Digital
2022	Dil-e-Veeran	Shabnam	ARY Digital
2022	Taqdeer	Saleha	ARY Digital
2023	Oye Motti Season 2	Amber's mother	Express Entertainment
2023	Ahsaas	Bilqees	Express Entertainment
2023	Fairy Tale	Abgheena Pasha	Hum TV
2023	Bandish 2	Jameela	ARY Digital
2023	College Gate	Hina	Green Entertainment
2023	Fairy Tale Season 2	Abgheena Pasha	Hum TV
2023	101 Talaqain	Mrs. Raees	Green Entertainment
2023	Mera Susraal	Nasreen	Aan TV
2023	Tera Waada	Nighat	ARY Digital
2024	Raaz	Malaika	Green Entertainment
2024	Tum Mere Kya Ho	Shehnaz	Hum TV
2024	Let's Try Mohabbat	Khursheed	Green Entertainment
2024	Shadi Card	Nighat	Express Entertainment
2025	Pyar Dil Ne Kia	Razia	Set Entertainment
2025	Muamma	Nahid	Hum TV
2026	Musafat	Samina	Hum TV

=== Web series ===
Year	Title	Role	Network
2021	Karachi Kahaani	Asma	See Prime

=== Telefilm ===
Year	Title	Role
2013	Lady Boxer	Munawara
2022	Chand Raat Aur Chandni	Chandni's mother
2022	Siwaiyaan	Rani
2022	Aunty Allergy	Farzana
2026	Masti Gate	Nighat
2026	Dadi Ki Shadi	Anila

=== Film ===
Year	Title	Role
2014	O21	Zarmeenay
2015	Halla Gulla	Chatpati
2016	Ishq Positive	Neelo
2017	Balu Mahi	Hasan's mother
2021	Khel Khel Mein	Hostel's Warden
2022	Khilona	Firdous
2022	Quaid-e-Azam Zindabad	Lady Constable
2023	Teri Meri Kahaniyaan	Parlour's owner
2023	Mayra Baoo	Taniya
