= Umeed (TV series) =

Pakistani television series

- امید
- Genre: Soap opera
- Written by: Mehrunnisa Mustaqeem Khan
- Directed by: Zahid Mehmood
- Starring: Erum Akhtar; Kashif Mehmood; Farhan Ally Agha; Sara Saif; Sidra Batool; Esha Noor
- Composer: Naved Nashad
- Country of origin: Pakistan
- Original language: Urdu
- No. of episodes: 75

Production
- Producers: Abdullah Kadwani; Asad Qureshi
- Camera setup: Multi-camera setup
- Production company: 7th Sky Entertainment

Original release
- Network: Geo Entertainment
- Release: 31 August – 13 November 2020

Umeed is a 2020 Pakistani drama television series, produced by Abdullah Kadwani and Asad Qureshi under their production banner 7th Sky Entertainment. It features Erum Akhtar, Kashif Mehmood, Farhan Ally Agha, Sara Saif and Sidra Batool as lead along with Sajid Shah, Asim Mehmood, Afshan Qureshi, Humaira Bano, Esha Noor and Farah Nadir in pivotal roles.

The serial marks the comeback of Sidra Batool to television as she was last seen in Shikwa Nahin Kisi Se, three years back, in 2017.

== Plot ==
Hailing from a lower middle-class family, Umeed is a young and innocent girl who shares a strong and loving bond with her mother, Zainab. Things come crashing down for the family when Saleem (Umeed's father) falls into the trap of stereotyping his own family due to financial hardships. With her marriage at stake and a daughter to take care of, Zainab stands up for herself and struggles to ward off the stigma around divorce. However, society's cruel remarks hold her back. The story follows the struggle of Zainab and her daughter, Umeed, as they face hardships in their lives.

== Cast ==
=== Main ===
- Erum Akhtar as Zainab
- Kashif Mehmood as Saleem Akram
- Farhan Ally Agha as Yasir
- Sidra Batool as Umeed
  - Sara Saif as Young Umeed
- Humaira Bano as Tamanna Aapa, sister of Saleem
- Asim Mehmood as Rameez

=== Recurring ===
- Sajeer Uddin as Aftab, husband of Tamanna
- Sajid Shah as Parvez, brother of Zainab
- Seema Khan as Naila, wife of Parvez
- Tasneem Ansari as Memoona Tariq, mother of Yasir.
- Afshan Qureshi as mother of Naila
- Saba Khan as Rabia, sister of Naila
- Imran Patel as Amjad, elder son of Tamanna
- Kausar Siddiqui as Shazia, Amjad's wife
- Zill E Huma as Shaheena, aka Guriya
- Inayat Khan as Fawad
- Syed Hamza as Jamal, second son of Tamanna
  - Owais Khan as Young Jamal
- Hina Rizvi as Mrs Bilgrami, Fawad's mother
- Hira Sheikh as Tehmina Begum, Rameez's mother
- Naeem Malik as Rabia's husband
- Zahid Mehmood as Aleem
- Esha Noor as Shela
- Farah Nadir as Shela's mother
- Khwaja Saleem as Shela's stepfather
- Tipu Sharif as Asad

=== Guest ===
- Mehboob Sultan as Aijaz, a local bandit
- Vasia Fatima as Surraiya, niece of Aftab
- Faheem Tejani, Saleem's lawyer
- Anees Alam as Akhtar, senior employee of Yasir
- Naeem Shaikh as Mr Jawad
