= Beenish Chohan =

Pakistani actress

- Born: 7 February 1986 (age 40); Lahore, Punjab, Pakistan
- Occupations: Actress, Model
- Years active: 2000 – present
- Children: 1

Beenish Chohan is a Pakistani actress and model. She is known for her roles in dramas Aik Aur Sitam Hai, Mera Saaein, Yeh Zindagi Hai, Tarap and Chaudhry and Sons.

== Career ==
She made her acting debut in 2000 on PTV. She is known for her roles in PTV dramas Malangi, Pheli Boond, Ghat Ki Khatir, Chalo Phir Se Jee Kar Dekhain and Mera Saaein on ARY Digital. She also starred as Nargis in the television series Yeh Zindagi Hai, which ran for six long years.

== Personal life ==
Beenish is married and has a son.

== Filmography ==
=== Television ===
| Year | Title | Role | Network |
|---|---|---|---|
| 2003 | Tum Hi To Ho | Komal | PTV |
| 2004 | Sadori | Shazia | PTV |
| 2005 | Tum Mere Ho | Naheed | PTV |
| 2006 | Dil, Diya, Dehleez | Jhoomer | Hum TV |
| 2007 | Malangi | Maryam | PTV |
| 2008 | Pheli Boond | Shaista | PTV |
| 2008 | Lyari Express | Asma | PTV |
| 2008 | Yeh Zindagi Hai | Nargis | Geo Entertainment |
| 2009 | Veena | Fazi | ARY Digital |
| 2009 | Dil Sey Dil Tak | Hiba | PTV |
| 2010 | Mera Saaein | Zeenat | ARY Digital |
| 2011 | Shakoor Saab | Hadia | ARY Digital |
| 2011 | Ghar Ki Khatir | Amna | PTV |
| 2011 | Bin Tere | Nausheen | Hum TV |
| 2011 | Amma Aur Gulnaz | Najma | Geo Entertainment |
| 2012 | Chalo Phir Se Jee Kar Dekhain | Sandleen | PTV |
| 2012 | Dil Ko Manana Nehi Aya | Sameen | PTV |
| 2012 | Meri Behan Meri Dewrani | Beena | ARY Digital |
| 2012 | Kahani Aik Raat Ki | Sherish | ARY Digital |
| 2012 | Mera Saaein 2 | Zeenat | ARY Digital |
| 2012 | Jahez | Ayesha | Geo Entertainment |
| 2013 | Matam | Saima | ARY Digital |
| 2013 | Yeh Zindagi Hai Season 2 | Nargis | Geo Entertainment |
| 2014 | Chahat | Zainab | PTV |
| 2014 | Deemak | Bano | Geo Entertainment |
| 2014 | Maang | Sidra | ARY Digital |
| 2015 | Kaanch Kay Rishtay | Munazzah | PTV |
| 2016 | Babul Ki Duayen Leti Ja | Haya | ARY Digital |
| 2017 | Pyaar Mein Twist | Javeria | ARY Digital |
| 2018 | Badbakht | Zanjabeel | ARY Zindagi |
| 2019 | Aik Aur Sitam Hai | Saira | A-Plus |
| 2019 | Makafaat Season 1 | Mehwish | Geo TV |
| 2020 | Sitam | Noor | Express Entertainment |
| 2020 | Tarap | Nida | Hum TV |
| 2022 | Mamlaat | Sonia | Geo TV |
| 2022 | Makafaat Season 4 | Nazia | Geo Entertainment |
| 2022 | Nisa | Najia | Geo TV |
| 2022 | Sirat-e-Mustaqeem Season 2 | Ishrat | ARY Digital |
| 2022 | Chaudhry and Sons | Mahpara | Geo TV |
| 2022 | Ant Ul Hayat | Tabbasum | Hum TV |
| 2023 | Dikhawa Season 4 | Saman | Geo Entertainment |
| 2023 | Sirat-e-Mustaqeem Season 3 | Lali | ARY Digital |
| 2023 | Shehar Ki Raatein - Meri Masoom Baitian | Hina | TV One |
| 2023 | Behroop | Kinza | Geo Entertainment |
| 2023 | Mein Kahani Hun | Aima | Express Entertainment |
| 2024 | Dikhawa Season 5 | Tabbasum | Geo Entertainment |
| 2024 | Bayhadh | Shireen | Geo Entertainment |
| 2024 | Guddi | Shazia | Geo Entertainment |
| 2025 | Makafaat Season 7 | Sanobar | Geo Entertainment |
| 2025 | Adhi Bewafayi | Dur-e-Fishan | Hum TV |
| 2025 | Ishq Tum Se Hua | Suraiya | Green Entertainment |
| 2025 | Baray Bhaiya | Fareeha | Geo TV |
| 2026 | Rang De | Zebunnisa | Geo Entertainment |

== Awards and nominations ==
| Year | Award | Category | Result | Title | Ref. |
|---|---|---|---|---|---|
| 2010 | PTV Awards | Best Actress | Won | —N/a | |
| 2011 | 10th Lux Style Awards | Best TV Actress Terrestrial | Nominated | Ghar Ki Khatir | |
| 2013 | 12th Lux Style Awards | Best TV Actress Terrestrial | Nominated | Chalo Phir Se Jee Kar Dekhain | |
