= Naeema Garaj =

Pakistani actress

- نعیمہ گرج
- Born: 1 October 1958 (age 67); Karachi, Pakistan
- Occupations: Actress; Child actress
- Years active: 1960 – present
- Children: 3
- Parent: Garaj Babu (father)

Naeema Garaj (born 1 October 1958) is a Pakistani actress. She is known for her roles in dramas Yeh Zindagi Hai, Agar Tum Na Hotay, Mohabbat Jaye Bhar Mein, New York Se New Karachi and Kab Mere Kehlaoge.

== Early life ==
Naeema was born on 1 October 1958 in Karachi, Pakistan. She started acting in theater along with her father Garaj Babu.

== Career ==
She made her film acting debut as a child actress in the 1960 film Clerk and later started to appear in dramas on PTV. She was noted for her roles in dramas Agar Tum Na Hotay, Mohabbat Jaye Bhar Mein, Kab Mere Kehlaoge and Noorpur Ki Rani. She also appeared in the drama Yeh Zindagi Hai and Yeh Zindagi Hai Season 2 as Shakira which was the longest-running television series. She also appeared in the movie Maalik as Asma. Since then she has appeared in dramas Phupho Amma, Upar Gori Ka Makaan, Bhai Bhai, Yehi Hai Zindagi, 3 Khawa 3, Ghar Damad and Rishta Anjana Sa.

== Personal life ==
Naeema is married and has children, Naeema father was a theater and film actor. Naeema's father Garaj Babu died in 2018. Her granddaughter is child actress Hoorain Lyka Ali

== Filmography ==
=== Television ===
Year	Title	Role	Network
1998	Such Much	Aani	PTV
1998	Shaam Sey Phelay	Sumaira's mother	PTV
2008	Mushkbar	Reshma	PTV
2008	Yeh Zindagi Hai	Shakira	Geo Entertainment
2009	Colony 52	Shanzeh	TV One
2009	Kuch Ankahi Baatein	Umer's aunt	ARY Digital
2009	Noorpur Ki Rani	Nimrah	Hum TV
2010	Khala Kulsum Ka Kumba	Anwari	PTV
2010	Kaahe ko Bhatai Bides	Naveed's mother	Geo TV
2010	Aros Paros	Rukshana	ARY Digital
2011	Jeena Sikha Do Hamein	Nudrat	Geo TV
2012	New York Se New Karachi	Kausar	TV One
2012	Yeh Guriya Meri Hai	Razia	PTV
2012	Pak Villa	Saeema	Geo TV
2012	Aks	Naila	ARY Digital
2012	Uss Ki Biwi	Ghazala	Hum TV
2013	Jakaria Kulsoom Ki Love Story Season 2	Nageena	ARY Digital
2013	Chhoti Chhoti Khushiyan	Javeria's mother	Geo TV
2013	Upar Gori Ka Makaan	Aliya	Express Entertainment
2013	Mohabbat Jaye Bhar Mein	Khala	Hum TV
2013	Kohar	Unsa	Urdu 1
2013	Yeh Zindagi Hai Season 2	Shakira	Geo Entertainment
2014	Phupho Amma	Nadara	PTV
2014	Agar Tum Na Hotay	Samina	Hum TV
2015	Yehi Hai Zindagi	Chand Tara	Express Entertainment
2016	Rishta Anjana Sa	Salma Begum	ARY Digital
2016	Yehi Hai Zindagi Season 2	Chand Tara	Express Entertainment
2017	Kab Mere Kehlaoge	Savera's mother	ARY Digital
2017	Yehi Hai Zindagi Season 3	Chand Tara	Express Entertainment
2017	3 Khawa 3	Sanchida	Aaj Entertainment
2017	Yehi Hai Zindagi Season 4	Chand Tara	Express Entertainment
2019	The Shareef Show Mubarak Ho	Herself	Geo TV
2019	Ghar Damad	Honey's grandmother	PTV
2019	The Shareef Show Mubarak Ho	Herself	Geo TV
2019	Bhai Bhai	Raheela	Express Entertainment
2023	Lyari Say Keamari	Faisal's mother	PTV
2024	Sirat-e-Mustaqeem Season 4	Shagufta	ARY Digital
2024	Barat Nahi Aaii	Rafiqa	Set Entertainment
2024	Dil Dukan Aur Bhaijan	Bushra	Set Entertainment
2024	Meem Se Mohabbat	Chaman	Hum TV
2025	ChulBuley Season 2	Mahpara	Set Entertainment
2025	Pyar Dil Ne Kia		Set Entertainment

=== Telefilm ===
Year	Title	Role
2013	Chanp Tayyar Hai	Nahni
2016	Meri Shadi Karwao	Shamim
2016	Patli Gali	Rubina
2017	Singham 2	Singham's Mother
2013	Agneepath 2	Vijay's Mother

=== Film ===
Year	Title	Role
1960	Clerk	Urdu
1960	Insaf	Urdu
1960	2 Ustad	Urdu
1960	Raat Kay Rahi	Urdu
1961	Tum Na Mano	Urdu
1961	Ham Ek Hayn	Urdu
1961	12 Bajay	Urdu
1961	Lakhon Fasanay	Urdu
1962	Chiragh Jalta Raha	Urdu
1962	Banjaran	Urdu
1963	Jab Say Dekha Hay Tumhen	Urdu
1963	Baaji	Urdu
1964	Tanha	Urdu
1964	Yeh Bhi Ek Kahani	Urdu
1967	Chhotay Sahib	Bengali / Urdu
1968	Chand Aur Chandni	Urdu
1968	Qulli	Urdu
1968	Jahan Bajay Shehnai	Urdu
1969	Daagh	Urdu
1969	Pyasa	Bengali / Urdu
1969	Meray Armaan Meray Sapnay	Urdu
1970	Maina	Urdu
1970	Payel	Bengali / Urdu
1970	Love in Europe	Urdu
1970	Chand Suraj	Urdu
1971	Insaf Aur Qanoon	Urdu
1971	Dil Aur Dunya	Urdu
1971	Al-Asifa	Urdu
1972	Ilzam	Urdu
1972	Soudagar	Urdu
1972	Main Bhi To Insan Hun	Urdu
1972	Suhag	Urdu
1972	Mann Ki Jeet	Urdu
1972	Raju	Punjabi
1973	Parday Mein Rehnay Do	Urdu
1973	Sadhu Aur Sheitan	Urdu
1973	Rangeela Aur Munawar Zarif	Urdu
1973	Nadiya Kay Paar	Urdu
1974	Samaj	Urdu
1974	Sacha Jhoota	Urdu
1974	Laila Majnu	Urdu
1974	Miss Hippy	Urdu
1975	Farz Aur Mamta	Urdu
1975	BeMisal	Urdu
1975	Bin Baadal Barsat	Urdu
1975	Paisa	Urdu
1975	Teray Meray Sapnay	Urdu
1975	Zanjeer	Urdu
1976	Ajj Di Taza Khabar	Punjabi
1976	Insan Aur Farishta	Urdu
1976	Mohabbat Aur Mehngai	Urdu
1977	Beti	Urdu
1977	Bharosa	Urdu
1977	Salakhen	Urdu
1978	Ek Chehra 2 Roop	Urdu
1978	Barat	Urdu
1978	Playboy	Urdu
1979	Nishani	Urdu
1980	Haseena Maan Jaye Gi	Urdu
1980	Nahin Abhi Nahin	Urdu
2016	Maalik	Urdu
2017	Truth or Dare	Urdu

== Awards and recognition ==
Year	Award	Category	Result	Title	Ref.
2024	9th Icon of the Nation Award	National Icon Award	Won	Contribution to Cinema Industry	
