= Mera Saaein 2 =

Pakistani TV series

- Genre: Drama; Political drama
- Written by: Parisa Siddiqi
- Creative director: Babar Javed
- Presented by: A & B Entertainment
- Starring: See below
- Theme music composer: Waqar Ali
- Opening theme: Mera Saaein
- Country of origin: Pakistan
- Original language: Urdu
- No. of seasons: 2 Mera Saaein
- No. of episodes: 26

Production
- Producer: A & B Entertainment
- Running time: 50 minutes

Original release
- Network: ARY Digital
- Release: 15 April – 7 October 2012

Mera Saaein 2 is a 2012 Pakistani political drama aired on ARY Digital. It is the sequel to the 2011 serial Mera Saaein. It was directed by Babar Javed, produced by A & B Entertainment and written by Parisa Siddiqi. Mere Saaein was also aired on Life OK in India.

== Story ==
For some families, evil runs in the blood. After killing Malik Wajahat, Shazmeen takes over his political party. Naina returns and claims her share in Wajahat's property but Shazmeen insults her and throws her out. She then meets Malik Yawar Hayat, Wajahat's cousin, who is the head of a political party opposed to Shazmeen. Naina then reveals that she had given birth to Wajahat's son and that he is still alive. She marries Malik Yawar and asks him to raise her son in a way that he can one day take down Shazmeen. The child is named Malik Shazamaan Wajahat Hayat. Shazmeen, meanwhile marries another politician named Iftikhar ul Ameen, who is a sharp and cunning man who has trapped Shazmeen for his own political favors. Years pass and Shazmeen ascends to the position of home minister. Naina has two other sons, Nabeel is the party head and Faraz is UK returned student who falls in love with Shazmeen's daughter Anam. Shazamaan marries Anaya Khoro, a powerful politician. Faraz falls in love with Shazmeen's daughter, Anam and they plan to marry. Both the families oppose their marriage and Malik Shazamaan offers help. He escorts them to his farmhouse where he kills both of them brutally.

== Cast ==
- Fahad Mustafa as Malik Shazmaan Wajahad Hayyat
- Aamina Sheikh as Naina Hayyat
- Sunita Marshall as Shazmeen Baghum
- Waseem Abbas as Malik Yawar Hayyat
- Beenish Chohan as Zeenat
- Ayeza Khan as Noor
- Mahnoor Baloch as Innaya
- Anoushay Abbasi as Nargees
- Shahood Alvi as Iftikar-ul-Ameen
- Zhalay Sarhadi as Soha
- Saniya Shamshad as Maria, Innaya's daughter
- Nausheen Shah as Erum, Shazmeen's daughter
- Maheen Rizvi as Anum, Erum's sister
- Adnan Jaffar as Naina's son

== Soundtrack ==
Its title song was sung by Zulfiqar Ali and Shabana Kauser, lyrics by Ali Moin and composed by Waqar Ali.
