= Aik Aur Sitam Hai =

Pakistani TV drama series

- Title screen
- Genre: Drama; Family drama
- Written by: Raheel Ahmed
- Directed by: Meem Alif Mirza
- Starring: Maria Wasti; Alyy Khan; Beenish Chohan; Sumbul Shahid
- Country of origin: Pakistan
- Original language: Urdu
- No. of episodes: 22

Production
- Production locations: Karachi and Tando Adam
- Running time: 30–45 minutes
- Production companies: Evolution Media; TNI Productions

Original release
- Network: A-Plus Entertainment
- Release: 20 February – 9 October 2019

Aik Aur Sitam Hai (transl. One More Atrocity) is a 2019 Pakistani television series, co-produced by Evolution Media and TNI Productions. The serial airs weekly episode on A-Plus TV every wednesday replacing Khafa Khafa Zindagi. It stars Maria Wasti, Alyy Khan, Fawad Jalal and Beenish Chohan.The title song of the series is sung by actress Zhalay Sarhadi.

== Cast ==
- Maria Wasti as Ruqsana
- Alyy Khan as Rasheed
- Beenish Chohan as Saira
- Fawad Jalal as Fahad
- Adnan Shah Tipu
- Sumbul Shahid
