= Naimat =

Pakistani television series

- Title screen
- Genre: Drama
- Written by: Naila Ansari
- Directed by: Abdullah Badini
- Country of origin: Pakistan
- Original language: Urdu
- No. of episodes: 23

Production
- Producers: Fahad Mustafa; Dr. Ali Kazmi
- Running time: 35-45 minutes
- Production company: Big Bang Entertainment

Original release
- Network: ARY Digital
- Release: 11 July – 26 December 2016

Related
- Sun Yaara

Naimat (Urdu: نِعمَت, lit. 'Blessing') is a Pakistani drama serial directed by Abdullah Badini and written by Naila Ansari. The drama aired on ARY Digital. Zahid Ahmed and Sunita Marshall play the lead roles of Babar and Sara respectively.

== Synopsis ==
Naimat is the story of Sara (Sunita Marshall) and Babar (Zahid Ahmed), who were a happily married couple, but the surprises of life brings a reason for them to get distant. The trouble in their happy life begins, when they learn that their 5-year-old son Bilal is suffering from a serious heart disease; and since then taking care of Bilal becomes the ultimate reason of Sara's life. Her full attention towards Bilal results in her neglecting Babar.

== Cast ==
- Zahid Ahmed as Babar
- Sunita Marshall as Sara
- Samina Ahmed as Babar's Mother
- Kiran Haq as Zara
- Seemi Pasha as Zara's Aunty
- Shahood Alvi as Doctor
- Ayesha Khan as Doctor's Mother
- Badar Khalil as Babar's Mother
