= Zinda Dargor =

- Title screen
- Genre: Drama; Social issue
- Written by: Samina Ejaz
- Directed by: Badar Mehmood
- Starring: Noman Ijaz; Saniya Shamshad; Maheen Rizvi; Adeel Chaudhry
- Country of origin: Pakistan
- Original language: Urdu

Production
- Producer: Fahad Mustafa
- Running time: approx. 35-45 minutes
- Production company: Big Bang Entertainment

Original release
- Network: ARY Digital
- Release: 11 May – 2 November 2015

Zinda Dargor (Urdu: زندہ درگور, lit. 'Buried Alive') is a Pakistani television series aired on ARY Digital. It was directed by Badar Mehmood and written by Samina Ejaz. The serial follows the life a girl, Aliya whose house gets attacked by robbers the day before her marriage thus her marriage is broken and also deals with the life of another girl Sonia. It showcases how society make girls like Aliya's life a hell and bury them alive.

== Cast ==
- Saniya Shamshad as Aliya
- Noman Ejaz as Dr. Mustafa, Eliya's love interest
- Waseem Abbas as Qasim, Aliya's father
- Laila Zuberi as Tehmeena, Aliya's Mother
- Maheen Rizvi as Sonia, Aliya's cousin elder daughter of Shehbaz and Waheeda
- Ismat Zaidi as Waheeda; Elder Sister of Qasim Aliya's aunt and Sonia's mother
- Farah Nadeem as Sonia's mother in law
- Manzoor Qureshi as Shehbaz, Waheeda's Husband
- Adeel Chaudhry as Sonia's husband

== Accolades ==
=== 15th Lux Style Awards ===
- Best TV Actor – Noman Ejaz – Nominated
