= New York Se New Karachi =

- Genre: Romance; Family drama
- Written by: Mohsin Ali
- Directed by: Fahim Burney
- Country of origin: Pakistan
- Original language: Urdu
- No. of episodes: 18

Production
- Executive producer: Seema Tahir Khan
- Producer: Syed Afzal Ali
- Production locations: Karachi, Pakistan; New York City

Original release
- Network: TV One Pakistan
- Release: 2 March – 29 June 2012

New York Se New Karachi (Urdu: نیو یارک سے نیو کراچی, lit. 'From New York to New Karachi') is a 2012 Pakistani television series that aired on TV One Pakistan. It was directed by Fahim Burney, with a script written by Mohsin Ali. It stars Azfar Rehman as Salman, a typical Karachi boy, and Ainy Jaffri as Sara, a modern girl returning to Pakistan along with her family.

At the 14th Lux Style Awards, it received nomination of Best Television Actor to Azfar Rehman.

== Plot ==
The story starts with a couple, Feroza and Kifayat who lives in New York from many past years. To attend a family wedding, their family comes to New Karachi, in Kifayat's ancestral home. Feroza with a sense of superiority complex, tires of her Punjabi sister-in-law, Razia. The story takes a turns when it reveals that their children, Sara and Salman are interested in each other and want to marry.

== Cast ==
- Asfar Rehman as Salman
- Annie Jafri as Sara
- Qavi Khan as Abba Ji
- Saba Hameed as Razia; Salman's mother
- Meekal Zulfiqar as Rony
- Adnan Jaffar as Kifayat; Sara's father
- Naeema Garaj as Kausar, Shehnaz's mother
- Zara Tareen as Feroza; Sara's mother
- Ghazala Javed
- Atif Rathore
- Ahmed Zeb
- Muhammad Hanif
- Fauzia Mushtaq
- Rubab Khan
- Saeed
- Christiana

== Nomination ==
- 14th Lux Style Awards - Best Television Actor - Azfar Rehman (Nominated)
