= Main Deewani =

Pakistani television drama series

- Urdu: میں دیوانی
- Written by: Faiza Iftikhar
- Directed by: Aabis Raza
- Starring: Saniya Shamshad; Fahad Mirza; Nirvaan Nadeem; Rabab Hashim
- Country of origin: Pakistan
- Original language: Urdu
- No. of episodes: 18

Production
- Producer: Momina Duraid
- Running time: 30–45 minutes

Original release
- Network: Hum TV
- Release: 1 February – 31 May 2014

Main Deewani (Urdu: میں دیوانی, lit. 'I Am Crazy') is a 2014 Pakistani television drama series that aired on Hum TV from 1 February 2014 to 31 May 2014. The eighteen-episode series was written by Faiza Iftikhar and directed by Aabis Raza. It centres on a young woman, Hadia, who lives with erotomania, a delusional disorder in which the affected person believes another person is in love with them. At the 3rd Hum Awards, held on 9 April 2015, the series received two nominations: Best Actor in an Impactful Character for Saniya Shamshad and Best Original Soundtrack for Fariha Pervez.

== Plot ==
Hadia suffers from erotomania, a rare delusional disorder, which causes her to behave in ways that are out of keeping with her usual character. Her grandmother keeps her under strict supervision because of her condition. Hadia becomes attracted to her cousin Zamin, who is already engaged; he breaks off his engagement to marry her. The disruption affects both families, and attitudes towards the couple shift. Hadia, feeling responsible for the consequences, begins to distance herself from Zamin.

== Cast ==
- Saniya Shamshad as Hadia
- Fahad Mirza as Zamin
- Rabab Hashim
- Nirvaan Nadeem
- Jamal Shah
- Samina Ahmed
- Lubna Aslam
- Mehmood Aslam

== Soundtrack ==
The original soundtrack, titled Iztaraab, was performed by Fariha Pervez, with lyrics by Aabis Raza and music composed by Shabi. The soundtrack received a nomination for Best Original Soundtrack at the 3rd Hum Awards.

== Awards and nominations ==
Year	Award	Category	Recipient	Result
2015	3rd Hum Awards	Best Actor in an Impactful Character	Saniya Shamshad	Nominated
2015	3rd Hum Awards	Best Original Soundtrack	Fariha Pervez	Nominated
