= Saniya Shamshad =

Pakistani actress

- Born: 5 October 1990 (age 35); Lahore, Pakistan
- Education: Punjab College
- Occupations: Actress; Model
- Years active: 2011 – present
- Spouse: Hidayat Syed (m. 2019)
- Children: 1

Saniya Shamshad is a Pakistan actress and model. She is known for her roles in dramas Piyari Bittu, Hiddat, Piya Naam Ka Diya, Rishtay Biktay Hain, Aseerzadi, Main Haar Nahi Manoun Gi, Sadqay Tumhare and Siyani.

== Early life ==
Saniya was born on 5 October 1990 in Lahore, Pakistan. She completed her primary schooling from Stigma Foundation and further studies from Punjab College.

== Career ==
She studied political science and sociology. During her studies Waseem Abbas noticed her potential in acting and cast her; then she made her acting debut in 2011 in drama Tere Pehlu Main opposite Affan Waheed. She appeared in dramas Aseerzadi, Mere Huzoor, Maya, Chhoti Chhoti Khushiyaan, Mein Adhuri, Mera Saaein 2, Bus Yunhi, and Ghaao. Then she also appeared in dramas Zinda Dargor, Rashk, Agar Tum Na Hotay, Piyari Bittu, Daraar, Main Deewani and Sadqay Tumhare. Since then she has appeared in dramas Piya Naam Ka Diya, Lagaao, Dastaar-e-Anaa, Rehaai, Main Haar Nahi Manoun Gi, Khidmat Guzar, Hiddat and Siyani.

== Personal life ==
Saniya married Hidayat Syed in July 2019 and moved to Australia. They welcomed a baby boy in July 2021.

== Filmography ==
=== Television ===
Year	Title	Role	Network
2011	Tere Pehlu Mein	Shazre	Geo TV
2011	Kitni Girhain Baaki Hain	Kiran	Hum TV
2012	Sehailyan	Zara	PTV
2012	Doosra Chehra	Guriya	PTV
2012	Maya	Seerat	ARY Digital
2012	Bus Yunhi	Rida	Urdu 1
2012	Thakan	Sofia	ARY Digital
2012	Mere Huzoor	Rabia	Express Entertainment
2012	Mera Saaein 2	Maria	ARY Digital
2012	Ghaao	Aleesha	Geo TV
2013	Aseerzadi	Fatima	Hum TV
2013	Chhoti Chhoti Khushiyaan	Javeria	Geo TV
2013	Rehaai	Kulsoom	Hum TV
2014	Agar Tum Na Hotay	Sania	Hum TV
2014	Daraar	Annie	ARY Digital
2014	Main Deewani	Hadia	Hum TV
2014	Izteraab	Dua	Hum TV
2014	Choti	Najia	Geo Entertainment
2014	Sadqay Tumhare	Humaira Batool	Hum TV
2015	Zinda Dargor	Aliya	ARY Digital
2015	Ek Sitam Aur Sahi	Rabia	Express Entertainment
2015	Aitebaar	Nageen	Aaj Entertainment
2015	Mein Adhuri	Areesha	ARY Digital
2016	Mohabat Subh Ka Sitara Hai	Nayab	Hum TV
2016	Ghalti	Zara	A-Plus
2016	Jab Tak Ishq Nahi Hota	Choti	Express Entertainment
2016	Lagaao	Sumbul	Hum TV
2017	Hiddat	Aqsa	Geo Entertainment
2017	Dastaar-e-Anaa	Mahnoor	TV One
2017	Khidmat Guzar	Heer	A-Plus
2017	Piyari Bittu	Bittu	Express Entertainment
2018	Noor Bibi	Hania	Geo TV
2018	Rashk	Minal	Express Entertainment
2018	Main Haar Nahi Manoun Gi	Arooba	Hum TV
2018	Aik Bond Zindagi	Sobia	A-Plus
2018	Kaisi Aurat Hoon Main	Savera	Hum TV
2019	Piya Naam Ka Diya	Naila	Geo Entertainment
2019	Rishtay Biktay Hain	Hania	ARY Digital
2022	Makafaat Season 4	Noshi	Geo Entertainment
2022	Meri Hai Kiya Khata	Zarfishan	Aan TV
2022	Dikhawa Season 3	Asfa Nasir	Geo Entertainment
2022	Mamlaat	Emaan	Geo Entertainment
2022	Oye Motti Season 2	Aiza	Express Entertainment
2022	Siyani	Ujala	Geo Entertainment
2023	Makafaat Season 5	Saba	Geo Entertainment
2023	Grift	Anisha	Geo TV
2023	Mera Susraal	Dua	Aan TV
2024	Tum Bin Kesay Jiyen	Zara	ARY Digital
2025	Makafaat Season 7	Saira	Geo Entertainment
2025	Aik Bhool	Hadia	Green Entertainment
2025	Chaalbaaz	Ayeza	ARY Digital
2026	Milkiyat	Soha	Geo TV

=== Film ===
Year	Title	Role
2012	Shanakhat	Daughter

== Awards and nominations ==
Year	Award	Category	Result	Title	Ref.
2013	2nd Hum Awards	Hum Award for Best Supporting Actress	Nominated	Rehaai	
2013	2nd Hum Awards	Hum Award for Best Supporting Actress	Nominated	Aseerzadi	
2014	3rd Hum Awards	Hum Award for Best Supporting Actress	Nominated	Sadqay Tumhare	
2015	3rd Hum Awards	Hum Award for Best Soap Actress	Nominated	Agar Tum Na Hotay	
2015	4th Hum Awards	Hum Award for Most Impactful Character	Nominated	Main Deewani	
