= Dhund (TV series) =

Pakistani television series

- Written by: Syed Mohammad Ahmed
- Directed by: Farrukh Faiz
- Starring: Maria Wasti; Syed Mohammad Ahmed; Hassan Ahmed; Fahad Rehman
- Country of origin: Pakistan
- Original language: Urdu
- No. of episodes: 29

Production
- Executive producer: Seema Tahir Khan

Original release
- Release: 15 July 2017 – 25 February 2018

Dhund (Urdu: دھند, lit. 'Fog') is a 2017-18 Pakistani television mystery drama series that aired on TV One. It was written by Syed Mohammad Ahmed and directed by Farrukh Faiz. Each episode of the series featured a new cast, except Maria Wasti, Hassan Ahmed, Fahad Rehmani and Syed Mohammad Ahmed who appeared in all episodes.

== Summary ==
The series revolves around a brave woman who can encounter dead people acting as a medium and subsequently helps spirits to find them peace while dealing with her own personal problems.

== Episodes ==
| No. | Title | Directed by | Written by | Original release date |
|---|---|---|---|---|
| 1 | "Episode #01" | Farrukh Faiz | Syed Mohammad Ahmed | July 15, 2017 |
Maria has a mysterious ability to see and communicate with spirits and she struggles to understand and control this power. Among the spirits she encounters is her deceased grandfather, Nana Syed, who serves as her guide, mentor, and source of comfort.
| 2 | "Episode #02" | Farrukh Faiz | Syed Mohammad Ahmed | July 22, 2017 |
Inspector Uzair informs Maria about her husband Imran's frequent past visits to Lahore to a woman Arjumand, to which Maria was unaware. In a restaurant Maria comes acrosss a man spirit sitting beside his college going daughter, Hania. When Hania leaves, Maria tells him to stay away from her as it will cause difficulties for her daughter but he doesn't accept. Hania, who was close to his deceased father, gets annoyed after his loving father's death and starts misbehaving with her mother Anjum. Her mother repeatedly asks and tries to make her accept the reality but she remains in awe of his memories and keep on writing notes for him. On the day of her birthday, she becomes joyous when finds a note of her father where he had mentioned his love for her and her mother. After Hania leaves the room, her mother keeps the empty note in the box where she had kept the previous notes. A woman comes to Maria's house introducing herself as Arjumand.
| 3 | "Episode #03" | Farrukh Faiz | Syed Mohammad Ahmed | July 29, 2017 |
Arjumand, the first wife of her husband, tells her about Maria's son Fawad's death and accuses Imran for a murder. Maria doesn't believe her stating her son is alive. Arjumand also visits Uzair. Saughanda and Momi, a Hindu-woman and a Muslim-man who want to enter in an interfaith marriage but were killed. Saughanda's spirit asks Maria to help Zain and Irum, the victims of almost similar situations. However, Uzair reaches bit late and the couple is shot dead. Maria and Uziar repent for not saving them. On his inquiry, Maria tells him about the address of Imran's family, a remote village of Punjab. At night, the spirits of Saughanda and Momi bring the spirits of Irum and Zain and asks Maria to keep help others.
| 4 | "Episode #04" | Farrukh Faiz | Syed Mohammad Ahmed | August 5, 2017 |
Maria's best friend Erum faces an unusual phase as she comes close to her colleague Kashif. On her visit to Maria, she faces something strange in her house but Maria denies it. Maria's househelp Sakina and driver Sajid also face slight paranormal activities in her house but she dismisses them. After returning from a date with Kashif, Erum comes to Maria where the spirit of Erum's deceased husband, Nomi, appears and tells Maria that Erum is upset with him and she has reacted positively to Kashif's proposal. Maria makes him clear that he has been dead, and his interference in Erum's life will add up to her difficulties. Erum gets a breakdown there over learning that her deceased husband is around her.
| 5 | "Episode #05" | Farrukh Faiz | Syed Mohammad Ahmed | August 13, 2017 |
Hira, the adopted daughter of the aged wheelchair ridden Jamal, wants to know about her identity. Jamal doesn't tell her anything due to the fear that she will leave him after learning about her biological parents. However, on her utmost insistence, he tells her that her family had died due to the earthquak in her homeland, Muzaffarabad, and her mother sold her for her better upbringing. Initially, Hira herself does some tactics to make her mother's spirit accountable by calling spirits, and later comes across Maria through one of her acquaintances, Humaira. Maria tells her the same that Jamal had told her. She further tells her that her mother is asking for forgiveness to which she replies that she has.
| 6 | "Episode #06" | Farrukh Faiz | Syed Mohammad Ahmed | August 20, 2017 |
Uzair updates Maria about Imran's recent activities. At night, the frightened Humaira calls Maria to her newly-rented house as she has been experiencing some paranormal activities since morning when an antique chair came to her house. The chair begins to swing and stop on its own. There, Maria comes across the spirit of Barrister Hashmat Ali Khan who tells her that this chair belongs to him and now this house too. He just wants to live here peacefully with some conditions. Humaira does not agree on the conditions instantly but later accepts when the spirit forces her to live there and she finds out that she couldn't change her house either. Uzair visits Maria informing her about Fawad and Imran.
| 7 | "Episode #07" | Farrukh Faiz | Syed Mohammad Ahmed | August 27, 2017 |
Sila, a kathak-dancer, becomes forced to leave her house that she had inherited from her mother when her stepfather and the stepbrother Saleem make her dance an issue of their honour. She takes shelter at Raana Madam, her dance teacher. Sila sends a legal notice to free her house. Her stepfather dies after a few days and Saleem then hires a contract killer to kill her. Sila's lawyer realises the criticality of her situation and makes her aware of the danger. He asks Uzair to help her to which he assures his support. At night, the contract killer comes to shoot Sila when Raana is out of the country for some dance festival.
| 8 | "Episode #08" | Farrukh Faiz | Syed Mohammad Ahmed | September 3, 2017 |
The contract killer calls Saleem informing him about Sila's murder. Afterwards, Saleem begins to experiment paranormal activities. Unable to do anything, the unseen power locks him in his apartment. Despite the trials by his neighbours, Sila's lawyer and the police team, they couldn't reach him due to the power. Uzair learns about Maria's physician, Dr. Afandi, who tells him on his utmost insistence that two years ago he was treating Maria for her Major depressive disorder. Maria and Uzair visit Sila in the hospital on her recovery from the coma where Maria explains him that sometimes in the coma the spirit comes out of the body and the same has happened in this also. After Sila's recovery, police succeeded in entering the flat where Saleem was locked and gives him first aid. Sila forgives Saleem. Uzair wishes Maria to meet her with her sister and mother but she tries to avoid stating her past relations are lost, not dead.
| 9 | "Episode #09" | Farrukh Faiz | Syed Mohammad Ahmed | August 2, 2017 |
The shifting reality of a street which seems to have vanished confuses the postman Yawar, where he goes to deliver a letter to Roshan Jahan Begum. He becomes extremely frightened after the incident and learns through an old man of the locality that a woman of this name had lived here years ago. He comes across Maria and she attempts to help him by uncover the truth about Roshan Jahan Begum and her connection to the street and the letter. Yawar gives the letter to her, and she reads it for the spirit of Roshan Jahan Begum who was anxiously waiting for this letter from his soldier son but was died before receiving it while struggling to save her house which was demolished illegally along with the entire street. Maria reads the letter for her stating that her son has mentioned that he will send the money order for her Hajj through his fellow soldier, Khair Muhammad. Later, Yawar receives another letter with a money order which was sent to Khair Muhammad. It reveals on him that the old man who had told him about Roshan Jahan Begum was Khair Muhammad.
| 10 | "Episode #10" | Farrukh Faiz | Syed Mohammad Ahmed | September 24, 2017 |
Following the accidental death of her son, Shani, Nida lives with intense guilt and Post-traumatic stress disorder. She struggles with the belief that his other son, Mani, was responsible for his death and consequently her love for Mani begins to diminish. Maria finds a child spirit, who was actually of Shani, in her house and her traumas resurfaces as it remembers her of Fawad. Erum however console her in this difficult time. She eventually succeeds in communicating Shani, who asks her to visit his mother. She does the same and helps Nida and Mani find peace by revealing the truth that the tragedy was not a result of malice or fault, but an accident. Through Maria’s intervention, the family eventually reaches a moment of catharsis where they are able to say goodbye to Shani and begin the process of moving forward from the grief.

== Cast ==
| Actors | Characters | Notes | Ref. |
Permanent cast
| Maria Wasti | Maria | | |
| Syed Mohammad Ahmed | Nana Syed | | |
| Hassan Ahmed | Inspector Uzair | | |
| Zhalay Sarhadi | Erum | | |
| Fahad Rehmani | Kashif | | |
Episodic appearances
| Asad Siddiqui | Waqar | Episode 1 | |
| Srha Asghar | Hania | Episodes 2, 20 | |
| Sania Saeed | Anjum | Episodes 2, 20 | |
| Angeline Malik | Arjumand | Episodes 3, 4 | |
| Christian Albert | Saughanda | Episode 3 | |
| Saad Qureshi | Mehmood "Momi" | Episode 3 | |
| Tauqeer Ahmed Paul | Zain | Episode 3 | |
| Noman Masood | Nomi | Episode 4 | |
| Arjumand Azhar | Jamal | Episode 5 | |
| Jinaan Hussain | Hira/ Lala Rukh | Episode 5 | |
| Marina Khan | Humaira | Episodes 5, 6 | |
| Almas Fidai | Sila | Episode 7, 8 | |
| Salman Faisal | Saleem | Episode 7, 8 | |
| Mariam Mirza | Madam Raana | Episode 7, 8 | |
| Ali Abbas | Yawar | Episode 9 | |
| Maira Khan | Saima | Episode 9 | |
| Saba Hameed | Roshan Jahan Begum | Episode 9 | |
| Salma Hassan | Nida | Episode 10 | |
| Sajida Syed | Nida's mother-in-law | Episode 10 | |

== Production ==
A meetup with bloggers was held in July 2017 before the launch of the series in Karachi.
