= Kalmoohi (2013 TV series) =

- Title screen
- Genre: Social drama Family drama
- Written by: Ibn e aas Muhammad
- Directed by: Syed Atif Hussain
- Starring: Maria Wasti; Badar Khalil; Moammar Rana; Qavi Khan
- Country of origin: Pakistan
- Original language: Urdu
- No. of seasons: 01
- No. of episodes: 23

Production
- Producers: A & B Entertainment
- Production location: Karachi
- Running time: 45–50 minutes

Original release
- Network: Geo TV
- Release: 21 November 2013 – 29 January 2014

Kalmoohi (Urdu: کلموہی, lit. 'Ill-Omened') is a 2014 Pakistani drama serial Written by Ibn e aas Muhammad and directed by Syed Atif Hussain aired on Geo TV on Wednesday and Thursday nights at 9:00 p.m. First episode was aired on 21 November 2013. Serial is written by Ibn-e-Aas and produced by A & B Production. Serial stars Maria Wasti, Moammar Rana, Badar Khalil in lead roles.

== Plot ==
This serial is about an orphan (yateem larki) Husna who lives with her step mother and step siblings and face hardships in her life. They called her Kallu because of her color complexion and treat her like a servant. They beat her and made life difficult for that innocent girl.

== Cast ==
- Maria Wasti as Husna
- Badar Khalil as Husna's grandmother
- Moammar Rana
- Ghazala Butt as Shakeela
- Qavi Khan
- Faizan Khawaja
- Maheen Rizvi
- Sadia Ghaffar
- Hannan Sameed
- Saleem Mairaj
- Afshan Qureshi as Nushaba
- Hina Rizvi as Khairan
- Hira Shaikh as Mehru
