= Afshan Qureshi =

Pakistani actress

- افشاں قریشی
- Born: Shaista Qureshi; 19 November 1959 (age 66); Karachi, Sindh, Pakistan
- Education: University of Karachi
- Occupation: Actress
- Years active: 1969 – present
- Spouse: Abid Qureshi (husband)
- Children: Faysal Qureshi (son)
- Relatives: Saima Qureshi (niece); Sana Qureshi (daughter-in-law); Riffat Qureshi (cousin); Rozina (cousin)

Afshan Qureshi (born 19 November 1959) is a Pakistani actress. She is known for roles in dramas Baba Jani, Barfi Laddu, Malika-e-Aliya and Log Kya Kahenge.

== Early life ==
Afshan was born on 19 November 1959 in Karachi, Pakistan. She completed her studies from University of Karachi.

== Career ==
She made her debut as a child actress in 1969 and appeared in Punjabi, Urdu and Pashto movies. She was noted for her roles in dramas Mere Hamrahi, Rang Laaga, Kalmoohi and Dil, Diya, Dehleez. She also appeared in dramas Mar Jain Bhi To Kya, Baba Jani, Barfi Laddu, Malika-e-Aliya, Umeed, Meri Zaat Zarra-e-Benishan, Umm-e-Kulsoom, and Akhri Barish. Since then she appeared in dramas Ghisi Piti Mohabbat, Log Kya Kahenge, Qayamat and Berukhi.

== Personal life ==
Afshan was married to actor Abid Qureshi. Their son Faysal Qureshi is a host, producer, director and actor. Abid Qureshi died when Faysal was quite young.

== Filmography ==
=== Television ===
Year	Title	Role	Network
1984	Andhera Ujala	Jaffar Begum	PTV
1988	Mirat-ul-Uroos	Khala	PTV
1995	Banjh	Zohra's mother	PTV
1996	Teesra Aadmi	Maria	PTV
1997	Family Front	Begum Amir	PTV
1998	Paranda	Begum Almas	PTV
1998	Haqeeqat	Sharjeel's mother	PTV
1999	Bulandi	Aapa Begum	PTV
1999	Naya Aadmi	Razia Begum	PTV
2002	Hawa Pe Raqs	Begum Sahiba	PTV
2004	Naseeb	Zartaj	PTV
2006	Dil, Diya, Dehleez	Saba	Hum TV
2009	Tanveer Fatima (B.A)	Nemo's mother	Geo TV
2009	Meri Zaat Zarra-e-Benishan	Aadil's mother	Geo TV
2010	Eid Manayain Bhai Abba Kay Sath	Aapa Bi	PTV
2011	Umm-e-Kulsoom	Maryam daughter's mother-in-law	ARY Digital
2011	Akhri Barish	Rukshana	Hum TV
2011	Kitni Girhain Baaki Hain	Samina	Hum TV
2012	Band Baje Ga	Aimal's mother	ARY Digital
2012	Mar Jain Bhi To Kya	Phuppu Nadir's mother	Hum TV
2013	Mere Hamrahi	Samina's mother	ARY Digital
2013	Kalmoohi	Nushaba	Geo TV
2014	Malika-e-Aliya	Kishwar	Geo Entertainment
2015	Rang Laaga	Shabana	ARY Digital
2015	Malika-e-Aliya Season 2	Kishwar	Geo Entertainment
2015	Ishq-e-Benaam	Sarjjo	Hum TV
2015	Bheegi Palkein	Ammi	A-Plus TV
2016	Haya Ke Daaman Main	Anwari	Hum TV
2017	Rishtay Kachay Dhagoon Se	Nomi's mother	A-Plus
2017	Is Chand Pay Dagh Nahin	Mahrukh's mother	A-Plus
2018	Ghamand	Razia	A-Plus
2018	Baba Jani	Fareeda	Geo Entertainment
2018	Lamhay	Sultana	A-Plus
2019	Barfi Laddu	Khala Qudsia	ARY Digital
2020	Shehr-e-Malal	Tabinda's mother	Express Entertainment
2020	Umeed	Naila's mother	Geo Entertainment
2020	Ghisi Piti Mohabbat	Nafisa Sherwani	ARY Digital
2020	Log Kya Kahenge	Haroon's mother	ARY Digital
2021	Qayamat	Pari's mother	Geo Entertainment
2021	Oye Motti	Ali's grandmother	Express Entertainment
2021	Berukhi	Atiya	ARY Digital
2021	Sirat-e-Mustaqeem	Khawar's mother	ARY Digital
2022	Teri Rah Mein	Faria's mother	ARY Digital
2022	Sirat-e-Mustaqeem Season 2	Saira's mother	ARY Digital
2022	Dil Bhatkay	Taniya's mother	TV One
2023	Aitraaf	Hamza's mother	Aan TV
2023	Ahsaas	Aasia's mother	Express Entertainment
2023	Sirat-e-Mustaqeem Season 3	Momina's grandmother	ARY Digital
2023	Baby Baji	Azra's mother	ARY Digital
2023	Kahain Kis Se	Rafay's mother	Hum TV
2023	Tere Siwa	Naheed	Mun TV
2024	Dard Dilon Kai	Munazza	PTV
2024	Sirat-e-Mustaqeem Season 4	Nadir's mother	ARY Digital
2024	Baby Baji Ki Bahuwain	Azra's mother	ARY Digital
2024	Sotan	Aiza's mother	Mun TV
2024	Mohabbat Aur Mehangai	Tarannum	Green Entertainment
2025	Ishq Tum Se Hua	Rakshanda	Green Entertainment
2025	Visaal-E-Ishq	Malka	Green Entertainment
2025	Chulbuley Season 2	Raisa Begum	Set Entertainment
2026	Nikammay	Sajida	Express Entertainment

=== Telefilm ===
Year	Title	Role
2022	Kanpain Tang Rahi Hain	Mrs. Abubakar

=== Film ===
Year	Film	Language
1969	Visakhi	Punjabi
1972	Janwar	Urdu
1978	Khamosh	Punjabi
1978	Mehman	Urdu
1978	Anmol Mohabbat	Urdu
1978	Qayamat	Urdu
1979	Dolai	Phasto
1979	Dadagir	Punjabi
1980	Samjhota	Urdu
1983	Kabhi Alwida Na Kehna	Urdu
1984	Muqaddar Ka Sikandar	Urdu
1985	Benazir Qurbani	Urdu
1985	Rishta Kaghaz Da	Punjabi
1985	Mashriq Maghrib	Urdu
1985	Miss Singapore	Urdu
1985	Wadera	Punjabi
1985	Direct Hawaldar	Urdu
1987	Greban	Urdu
1987	Meri Awaz	Urdu
1987	Silsila	Punjabi
1988	Sherni	Punjabi / Urdu
1988	Taqatwar	Punjabi
1989	Ishq Rog	Punjabi
1989	Mujrim	Punjabi
1990	Khandani Badmash	Punjabi
1990	Barood Ka Tohfa	Urdu / Pashto
1991	Ishq	Punjabi / Urdu
1991	Ziddi Mera Naa	Punjabi
1991	Ishq Deewana	Punjabi / Urdu
1991	Qatil Qaidi	Punjabi
1992	Naela	Punjabi / Urdu
1992	Daku Raaj	Punjabi
1992	Ishq Rehna Sada	Urdu
1992	Dosti	Urdu / Punjabi
1992	Koday Shah	Punjabi
1992	Ishq Zindabad	Urdu / Punjabi
1992	Silsila Pyar Da	Punjabi / Urdu
1992	Sher Ali	Punjabi
1994	Naseeb	Punjabi / Urdu
1994	Ghunda Raj	Punjabi
1994	Aakhri Mujra	Urdu
1995	Dharkan	Urdu
1995	Madam Rani	Punjabi
1996	Munda Shararti	Punjabi
1996	Iqtadar	Punjabi
1996	Saza	Urdu
1997	Mard Jeenay Nahin Detay	Urdu
1997	Mohabbat Hay Kya Cheez	Urdu
1999	Shabna Bangri Bat Sheh	Pashto
1999	Koela	Urdu
1999	Daku Rani	Punjabi
2000	Reshma	Punjabi
2001	Gujjar 302	Punjabi
2002	Ghazi Ilmuddin Shaheed	Punjabi
2003	Lahori Thug	Punjabi
2004	Mahnoor	Urdu

== Awards and recognition ==
Year	Award	Category	Result	Presented by	Ref.
2023	8th Icon of the Nation Awards	Best Icon Actress	Won	Icon Nation Awards Committee	
