= Ruswa =

- Written by: Riffat Siraj
- Directed by: Erum Binte Shahid
- Starring: Maria Wasti; Faysal Quraishi; Qavi Khan; Arjumand Rahim
- Country of origin: Pakistan
- Original language: Urdu
- No. of episodes: 22

Production
- Producers: Asif Raza Mir; Babar Javed
- Production company: A&B Entertainment

Original release
- Network: Geo Entertainment
- Release: May 2011 – September 2011

Ruswa is a Pakistani television serial written by Riffat Siraj, directed by Erum Binte Shahid and produced by A&B Entertainment. The series stars Maria Wasti, Faysal Quraishi and Qavi Khan as the leads. The series aired on Geo Entertainment from May to September 2011.

== Plot ==
Sundari is an orphaned Hindu girl living in a remote village in Sindh with her aunt, Khushi, and Khushi’s lazy and irresponsible son, Shankar. When Khushi falls seriously ill, she sends Sundari to live with a neighboring family for her protection.

The neighbor, Suraj, arranges Sundari’s marriage to an elderly man named Ram Dayal in exchange for ten thousand rupees. Shortly after the marriage, Ram Dayal dies. His son sees Sundari as nothing more than an opportunity to make money and sells her to another man for fifty thousand rupees. Refusing to accept the life that has been forced upon her, Sundari manages to escape and eventually reaches Karachi, hoping that she will finally find somewhere safe to live.

In Karachi, Sundari is taken in by a kind and religious elderly man whom his family affectionately calls Abba Miyan. His granddaughter, Somia, welcomes Sundari warmly, and Abba Miyan treats her with compassion. Abba Miyan’s elder son, Asif, his wife Sabiha, and Talal, the son of his younger son Saim, are uncomfortable with Sundari because she is Hindu. They treat her with suspicion and make her feel that she does not truly belong in the house. Considering her presence as a tension for the family, Sundari decides to leave. One night, however, Talal stops her and accuses her of trying to escape after stealing something from the house. The accusation leads to a painful confrontation, but Sundari’s innocence is eventually established.

Meanwhile, Saim’s family is preparing for his second marriage. Years earlier, his first wife, Naima, had divorced him and left the family, leaving their young son Talal behind. The family had hidden the truth from Talal, telling him that his mother had died when he was a child.

As Sundari continues to feel like a burden on Abba Miyan’s family, she decides to move into a newly established shelter home. Abba Miyan gives her permission, although he remains uneasy about the place and worries about her safety.

Sundari learns that the shelter is not what it appears to be as its owner targets vulnerable girls who have no relatives or anyone to protect them and sells them to other people. Matters become even worse for Sundari when she gets into an argument with a Muslim woman at the shelter. The warden takes away Sundari’s murti, preventing her from performing her religious worship. Abba Miyan visits the shelter. Sundari secretly tells him what has been happening, and he immediately takes her back home.

After Sundari returns, Sabiha gradually becomes more sympathetic toward her, offering her a Shalwar kameez to change her attire from Sarhi. One day, while Abba Miyan is reading the Quran, Sundari becomes curious and asks him about the book. He tells her that the Quran teaches people about humanity, compassion, kindness, and treating others with respect. Sundari is deeply touched by what he tells her and asks Abba Miyan to teach her how to read and understand it. He agrees.

At the same time, Talal is struggling with the thought of his father getting married again. His anger and resentment grow, and he blames Sundari for the changes taking place in his family. One night, he tries to force her out of the house. Saim rebukes his son, making him realise that Sundari has done nothing wrong and does not deserve his hatred.

Then, one night, the family receives an unexpected phone call. Sundari answers it and discovers that the woman on the other end is Naima, who has been absent from his son, Talal's life for eighteen years. The revelation shocks the entire family. They debate whether Talal should be told that his mother is alive. Abba Miyan believes that Talal is old enough to know the truth and refuses to manipulate him by hiding Naima’s existence. When Naima finally returns, Talal is devastated. He is forced to confront the painful truth that his family had allowed him to believe his mother was dead for most of his life.

As Naima’s return creates new tensions within the family, Sundari and Saim gradually become closer. Saim begins to admire Sundari’s courage, innocence, and compassion, while Sundari develops feelings for him. During this period, Sundari’s growing understanding of the Quran and Abba Miyan’s teachings leads her to embrace Islam. She takes the name Tayyaba.

Abba Miyan eventually decides that Saim and Tayyaba should marry. They agree, and the two are married. However, on their wedding night, Saim admits that he agreed to the marriage mainly because he respected Abba Miyan’s wishes. He tells Tayyaba that he may not be able to give her the love and affection she deserves.

Meanwhile, Naima begins visiting the family regularly to see Talal. She eventually tells Abba Miyan that she wants to take Talal to Islamabad for a few days. Abba Miyan allows him to go with her. When Naima and Talal return, the family is celebrating the walima reception for Saim and Tayyaba. Naima’s unexpected appearance at the gathering makes it clear that she has once again become a part of Talal’s life, leaving the family unsettled. The very next morning, Abba Miyan suddenly becomes seriously ill and is rushed to the hospital. He dies shortly afterward, leaving the entire family devastated and deprived of the person who brought wisdom, compassion, and unity to the family.

After Abba Miyan’s death, Saim learns that Naima wants to take Talal to the US. Fearing that his son may never return, Saim proposes a compromise. He tells Naima that she can see Talal whenever she wants and can even live with the family so that she can remain close to her son. She initially hesitates, but she eventually agrees to stay with the family, especially after finding it difficult to make arrangements to take Talal abroad due to the possession of Talal’s legal documents by Saim.

After Saim and Naima's increasing closeness, Tayyaba begins living in Abba Miyan’s old room. Sabiha and Somia notice her pain and try to comfort her as she struggles with the growing distance between herself and her husband. Despite agreeing to stay, Naima does not completely give up on the idea of taking Talal to the US. She tells Saim that she needs to return to the US because her daughters there are facing difficulties. She says that she plans to take Talal with her, at least for a short visit. Saim immediately becomes suspicious that she may ultimately try to keep Talal with her permanently, and refuses her. Talal also doesn't agree and chooses to stay with his father feeling that Saim, who remained a part of his life all these years, deserves this chance. With no other choice, Naima leaves for the US alone. Before leaving, she tells Talal that he can visit her whenever he wants.

After Naima’s departure, Saim finally returns to Tayyaba. Realizing the pain he has caused her, he seeks reconciliation and begins trying to repair their relationship.

== Cast ==
- Maria Wasti as Sundari/ Tayyaba
- Faysal Quraishi as Saim
- Qavi Khan as Abba Miyan
- Sami Sani as Asif
- Nazli Nasr as Sabiha
- Noman Habib as Talal
- Arjumand Rahim as Naima
- Amber Nausheen as Tahira
- Zaheen Tahira as Khushi
- Akbar Subhani as Ram Dayal
- Adnan Shah Tipu as Ram Dayal's son

== Reception ==
In a review for Mag The Weekly, the reviewer praised Maria Wasti's performance stating, "as she plays Sundri she becomes the part wholeheartedly", but questioned the depiction of realism of such an idealised and welcoming family and the existence of selfless individuals like Abba Miyaan in our society.

In an editorial for The News International, Sadaf Haider noted that the series presents the "usual clichéd refrain" in the portrayal of the protagonist, belonging to a minority. She argues that although conversions happens but such portrayals leave little room for other different aspects.
