= Anoushay Abbasi =

Pakistani actress

- Born: Anoushay Abbasi; 24 November 1993 (age 32); Karachi, Sindh, Pakistan
- Occupations: Actress, model
- Years active: 2012 – present
- Relatives: Shamoon Abbasi (brother); Anzela Abbasi (niece)

Anoushay Abbasi is a Pakistani television actress and model. She started her career as a child artist at PTV. In her acting career, she is widely known for her leading roles in the television series Mera Saaein 2 (2012), Meri Saheli Meri Humjoli (2012), Tootay Huway Per (2011), Nanhi (2013), Pyarey Afzal (2013), Malika-e-Aliya (2014), Bhanwar (2014), Malika-e-Aliya Season 2 (2015), Meray Paas Tum Ho (2019), Raqs-e-Bismil (2020) and Benaam (2021).

== Life and career ==
Abbasi started her career as a child artist and appeared in various television serials of PTV. She appeared in the serial Tootay Huway Per opposite Ayeza Khan, Sami Khan and Mohib Mirza and appeared in the Geo TV serial Kaahe Ko Biyahee Bades opposite Sami Khan and Ahsan Khan, ARY Digital serial Mera Saaein 2 opposite Fahad Mustafa, Ayeza Khan and Mahnoor Baloch and Urdu 1 serial Meri Saheli Meri Humjoli opposite Hasan Ahmed, Neelam Muneer and Faizan Khawaja.

She appeared in the ARY Digital serial Kaala Jaadu, Geo TV serial Nanhi and Roshini Andhera Roshini on ATV for which she earned the Lux Style Award for Best TV Actress (Terrestrial).

Abaasi married actor Ainan Arif, son of cricket player Taslim Arif and actress Rubina Arif on 27 September 2014.

In 2019, she made her acting come back with Mere Paas Tum Ho.

== Filmography ==
=== Films ===
Year	Title	Role	Notes
2027	Inspector Jamshed: The Secret Parchment	Shakeela Begum	Lead role

=== Television ===
Year	Title	Role	Notes
2011	Tootay Huway Per	Nimra	
2012	Mera Saaein 2	Nargis	
2012	Mere Aangne Main		
2012	Kaahe Ko Biyahee Bades		
2012	Meri Saheli Meri Humjoli	Wafa	
2012	Behkawa		
2012–2013	Khushboo Ka Ghar	Fiza	
2013	Kaala Jadu		
2013	Nanhi		
2013	Kitni Girhain Baaki Hain		
2013	Roshini Andhera Roshini		
2013	Yeh Mera Deewanapan Hai	Mina	
2013–2014	Pyarey Afzal	Arfa Subhan Ullah	
2014	Hum Tehray Gunahgaar	Aisha's sister	
2014	Malika-e-Aliya	Chanda	
2016	Maikay Ki Yaad Na Aaye		
2016	Bhanwar		
2016	Malika-e-Aliya (season 2)	Chanda	
2017	Mohabbat Mushkil Hai	Aqsa	
2018	Madventures	Contestant	
2019	Mere Paas Tum Ho	Ifra; Monty's wife	
2019	Ghalati	Maira	
2020	Prem Gali	Farheen aka Fari	
2020	Raqs e Bismil	Sakina	Hum TV
2021	Benaam	Aimal	
2021	Bebasi	Nadia	
2026	Hurmat	Dancer	

=== As host ===
Year	Title	Notes
2021	Kashmir Premier League	
2021	Sports Paaltix	Released on BSports Pakistan's YouTube Handle

=== Short film ===
Year	Title	Platform	Notes
2021	Dancing Doll	See Prime	
2021	Banu Aur Bachchay	See Prime	

=== Web series ===
Year	Title	Platform	Notes
2020	Churails	ZEE5	Cameo
2024	Abdullahpur Ka Devdas	ZEE5	

=== Music video ===
Year	Title	Platform	Singer
2020	Ye Watan Tumhara Hai		Various
2021	Peer Bulave	Kashmir Beats	Herself along with Omer Shahzad
2021	Nawazish	Auj	Abdur Rehman
2021	Bewafa	C1 Shorts	Nabeel Shaukat Ali
