= Saad Qureshi (artist) =

British contemporary artist

- Known for: Sculpture; drawing

Saad Qureshi (born 1986 in Bradford) is a contemporary artist best known for making large scale sculptures and drawings.

== Work and career ==
Qureshi grew up in Bradford, and was inspired by an art teacher here to become interested in and pursue art. His early years in Bradford also influenced the themes he went on to address in his art practice, having been in Bradford during the 2001 race riots, and witnessed the clashing contrasting communities. He then moved to Oxford when he received a scholarship to study BA Fine Art at Oxford Brookes University, graduating in 2007. After spending a year working at Modern Art Oxford, Qureshi then went to study an MFA at the Slade School of Fine Art, University College London, in 2010. In 2009, during his final year studying at the Slade, Qureshi was a finalist in the BBC2 programme School of Saatchi.

In 2018 Qureshi returned to Oxford Brookes University as he was commissioned to create a new piece of permanent public art for the campus. Qureshi made a series of sculptures for the courtyard at Headington Campus. The sculptures are entitled Assembly and consist of five bird like creatures cast in bronze.

In 2019 Qureshi held a major exhibition at the Yorkshire Sculpture Park: Something About Paradise.

== Awards ==
Arts Council England, Research Award 2014

Celeste Prize Finalist, Rome

Royal British Society of Sculptors Bursary Award 2012

The Red Mansion Foundation Prize 2009

== Collections ==
Leeds Art Gallery

The Farjam Foundation Collection, Dubai

The Bagri Foundation, London

Dipti Mathur Collection, California

== Solo exhibitions ==
Something About Paradise, Yorkshire Sculpture Park, Barnsley, 2020

When The Moon Split, Aicon Gallery, New York, 2017

time | memory | landscape, Gazelli Art House, London, 2017

Congregation, Gazelli Art House, London, 2014

In the Remains, Aicon Gallery, New York, 2013

Other crescents, other moons, Gazelli Art House, London, 2012
