= Maria Wasti =

Pakistani actress-model

- ماریہ واسطی
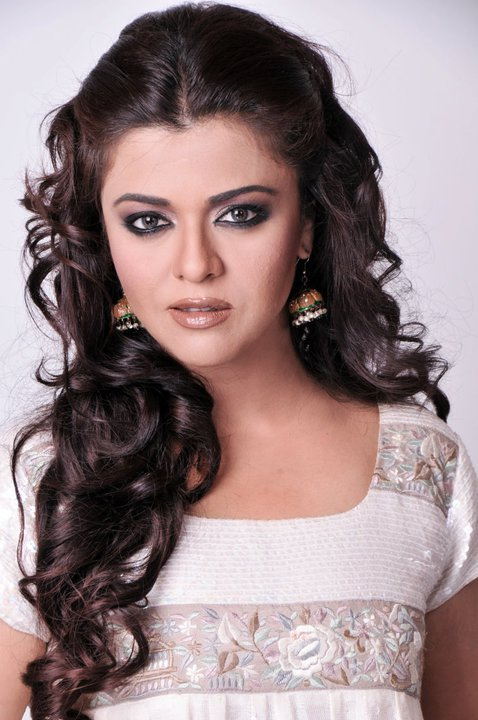
- Maria Wasti in 2010
- Born: Maria Wasti; Dar Es Salaam, Tanzania
- Years active: 1995–present

Maria Wasti (Urdu: ماریہ واسطی) is a Pakistani film and television actress and host. She currently hosts the game show Croron Mein Khel on the Pakistani television channel BOL Entertainment.

== Early life ==
=== Early years ===
Maria Wasti was born in Dar Es Salaam, Tanzania. She spent her early years there before moving to Pakistan with her family. She is the niece of actors Rizwan Wasti and Tahira Wasti. Wasti's parents wanted her to be a doctor, but she preferred a career in entertainment. At the time, the only television network in the country was the state-owned Pakistan Television Corporation. It would be later in the 1990s that Network Television Marketing (NTM), the country's first privately owned channel, showcased content specifically targeted at the young generation, and Wasti became interested in acting.

== Career ==
=== First teleplay ===
In the mid-1990s, Wasti was approached by Bakhtiar Ahmed, the program manager of Pakistan Television Lahore Centre, to be cast in a play called Sarah Aur Ammara alongside Resham, a film actress. The teleplay highlighted a story about two sisters going through the turmoil of arranged marriages. She has since done over 50 serials and around the same number of assorted plays.

=== Acting as a career ===
Wasti recalls that her first experience in acting was because of her passion for art, but later her parents told her to pursue the career in a professional manner. After her first stunt, Wasti began receiving roles in various other plays in Lahore, Karachi, and Islamabad centers for Pakistan Television. She reminisces that people were skeptical when she stepped into acting, but once she proved herself, they started accepting her.

She considers Bano Qudsia and Kallo among her most memorable plays. In other equally applauded roles, she played a victim in Baadlon Par Basera, who is forcefully led into marriage with a man in the United States on the phone, and when she meets him for the first time, she realizes the man is older than the picture she saw him in.

Wasti is usually seen playing unglamorous roles involving sensitive issues regarding women in Pakistan. She has played roles depicting prominent women like Salma Murad and Bilquis Edhi. Wasti is known for being outspoken on various issues like women's rights, harassment, gender equality, and prejudice.

=== Recent ventures ===
Wasti has said that new Pakistani plays should portray issues of contemporary Pakistan. She names drugs and AIDS as being among the most sensitive. She also cites the reason for the decrease in the quality of drama serials as the lack of a supply of actors, actresses, writers, directors, and producers.

In view of these thoughts, Wasti opened a production house in 2002, where she has successfully produced several serials and a dozen of plays.

== Filmography ==
=== Television ===
Year	Title	Role	Network	Notes
1995	Shakhsar	Rafya	PTV	
1996	Adam Zaad	Sakeena	PTV	Anthology: Hairat Kadah
1997	Ashiyana	Saima	PTV	
1998	Kallo		PTV	
1999	Sarah Aur Ammara		PTV	
1999	Ehsaas		PTV	
1999	Thori Si Zindagi		PTV	
1999	Boota from Toba Tek Singh	Zulekha	PTV	
1999	Chandpur Ka Chandoo	Fareeha	PTV	
1999	Mario	Rubi	PTV	
2000	Tawan	Munazza	PTV	
2001	Apno Se Door		PTV	
2001	Baadlon Par Basera	Shamail	PTV	
2001	Dharkan		PTV	
2001	Sheeshay Ka Mehal		PTV	
2002	Dunya Dari	Mehvish	PTV	
2003	Shanakht	Nishat	PTV	
2004	Maa	Shazi	PTV	
2004	Moorat	Kousar	ARY Digital	Nominated–Lux Style Awards for Best TV Actress
2004	Aangan Bhar Chandni			
2004	Neela Aasman		PTV	
2005	Aandhi		PTV	
2005	Riyasat	Ayesha		Lux Style Awards for Best Actress
2006	Neend			
2006	Kuch Dil Ne Kaha	Shaista		Nominated–Lux Style Awards for Best TV Actress
2007	Thori Door Saath Chalo			
2008	Khandaan			
2008	Kaun			
2008	Aag	Shumayla		
2009	Saray Gamay	Rakshi	PTV Home	
2009	Jab Hatheli Par Chand Likhna			
2009	Tujh Pe Qurban	Maria		
2009	Kuch Unkahi Baatain			
2009	Buri Aurat			
2010	Tere Liye			
2010	Woh Chaar			Episode 8, 11
2010	Aey Ishq Hamain Barbad Na Kar			
2010	Diya Jalay	Seemab		
2011	Love Kay Liye			
2011	Ruswa	Sundari/ Tayyaba		
2011	Aurat Ka Ghar Konsa	Nayab		Nominated–PTV Awards for Best Actress
2011	Akhri Barish			
2011	Kaali Aankhain			
2012	Behkawa	Maya		
2012	Sasural Ke Rang Anokhay			Episode 7
2012	Kitni Girhain Baqi Hain			Various Episodes
2012	Band Baje Ga			
2012	Barish Kay Ansoo			
2013	Kahani Eik Raat Ki			Episode 15
2013	Kabhi Kabhi			
2013	Rehaai	Shehnaz		Nominated–Hum Awards for Best Supporting Actress
2013	Kalmoohi	Husna		
2013	Justju	Alina	ARY Digital	
2013	Meri Ladli	Arfa		
2014	Malika-e-Aliya	Malika Aliya		
2015	Khoat			
2015	Bojh			
2015	Kaise Huye Benaam			
2015	Jalebiyan	Noor Jahan		
2016	Teri Chah Mein			
2016	Kitni Girhain Baaki Hain (Season 2)			Episode "Tasawwur", "Garhasti"
2017	Malkin	Gulnaz		
2017	Jab Hatheli Per Chand Likhna			
2017	Dhund	Maria		
2018	Babban Khala Ki Betiyann	Habiba "Billo"		
2018	Court Room			
2018	Naik Parveen			
2018	Siskiyaan			
2018	Ustani Jee			Episode 14, 15
2018	Aik Aur Sitam Hai	Rukhsana		
2019	Cheekh		ARY Digital	Special appearance in promo
2019	Bhook	Naureen	Hum TV	
2019	Croron Mein Khel			Reality show Host
2020	Shehr-e-Malal	Tabinda	Express Entertainment	
2020	Game Show Aisay Chalay Ga		Captain "Islamabad Eagles"	
2020	Dikhawa			Episode "Hamdard"
2022	Aik Sitam Aur	Zainab	ARY Digital	
2023	Mayi Ri	Samina	ARY Digital	
2023	Fareb	Shehnaz	Hum TV	
2026	Muamma	Zulekha	Hum TV	

=== Telefilm ===
- Kallo
- Parinda

=== Film ===
- Ramchand Pakistani, 2008 - Kamla
- Love Mein Ghum

== Accolades ==
Ceremony	Category	Project	Result	Ref.
4th Lux Style Awards	Best TV Actress (Satellite)	Moorat	Nominated	
6th Lux Style Awards	Best TV Actress (Satellite)	Kuch Dil Nay Kaha	Nominated	
8th Lux Style Awards	Best Film Actress	Ramchand Pakistani	Won	
