= Meri Saheli Meri Humjoli =

Pakistani television series

- Screen title
- Genre: Drama
- Written by: Nadia Akhtar
- Directed by: Bachal Kalhoro
- Starring: Anoushay Abbasi; Neelam Muneer; Hasan Ahmed; Farhan Ali Agha; Kanwar Arsalan; Ubaida Ansari
- Country of origin: Pakistan
- Original language: Urdu
- No. of episodes: 117 (Last Episode – 27 Oct 2012)

Production
- Production location: Karachi
- Running time: 35–40 minutes
- Production company: A & B Entertainment

Original release
- Network: Urdu 1

Meri Saheli Meri Humjoli (Urdu: میری سہیلی میری ہمجولی, English: My friend my peer) is a 2012 Pakistani television series aired on Urdu 1. Stars are Anoushay Abbasi, Neelam Muneer, Lubna Aslam, Hasan Ahmed, Farhan Ali Agha and Kanwar Arsalan.

== Synopsis ==
Story of two best friends, Ehasas (Neelam Muneer) and Wafa (Anoushay Abbasi). For Ehsas, money is everything and for Wafa, Love is above all. They pay a heavy price for chasing their dreams and getting what was never destined for them.

== Cast ==
- Anoushay Abbasi as Wafa
- Neelam Muneer as Ehasas
- Farhan Ali Agha
- Kanwar Arsalan
- Ubaida Ansari as Sabiha
- Hasan Ahmed
- Faizan Khawaja
- Lubna Aslam
- Ali Afzal
- Hajra
- Mehak Ali

== Awards and nominations ==
Year	Award	Category	Recipient(s)	Result
11 January 2014	Pakistan Media Awards	Best Drama Serial	Meri Saheli Meri Humjoli	Nominated
11 January 2014	Pakistan Media Awards	Best Director Drama Serial	Bachal Kalhoro	Nominated
11 January 2014	Pakistan Media Awards	Best Drama Writer	Nadia Akhtar	Nominated
