= Hassan Ahmed (actor) =

Pakistani actor and model

- حسن احمد
- Born: Hassan Ahmed; 14 April 1982 (age 44); Karachi, Sindh, Pakistan
- Education: Institute of Business Management
- Occupations: Model, actor
- Years active: 2009–present
- Spouse: Sunita Marshall (m. 2008)

Hassan Ahmed (Urdu: حسن احمد; born 14 April 1982) is a Pakistani actor and model. He earned critical acclaim for his roles in television series Saiqa, Zindagi Dhoop Tum Ghana Saya and Meri Saheli Meri Humjoli. His performance in series Agar Tum Na Hotay earned him Best Soap Actor nomination at 3rd Hum Awards.

== Personal life ==
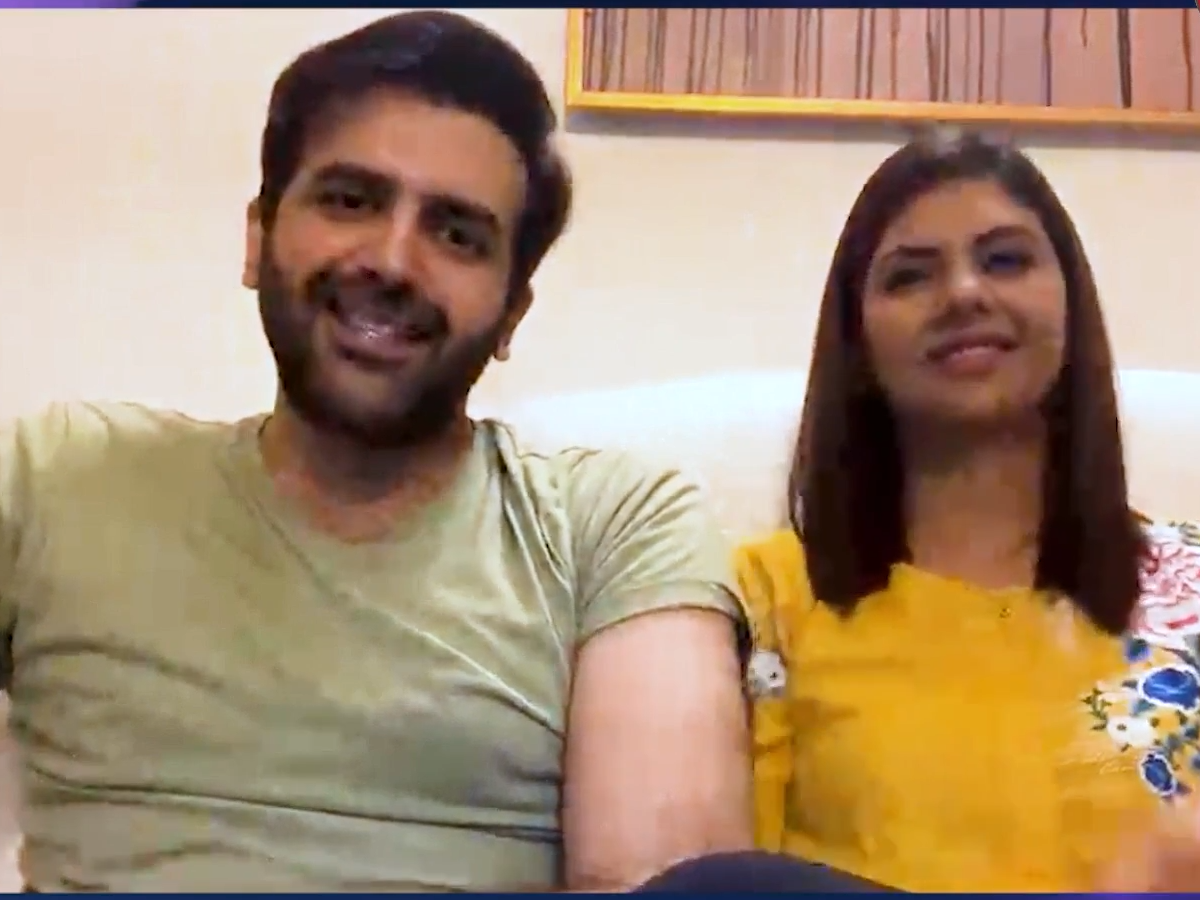
Ahmed with his wife in 2022

Ahmed was born in Karachi on 14 April 1982. He graduated from the Institute of Business Management with an MBA. In 2008, he married his co-star, Sunita Marshall, in an Islamic wedding, and then had a Catholic ceremony three months later, as his wife is Christian.

He was kidnapped in 2013 for ransom and was freed after 35 days.

== Television ==
Year	Title	Role	Network	Ref.
2009	Saiqa	Fakhar		
2009–10	Mannchalay	Usman Khawaja		
2010	Bahu Rani			
2011	Meray Khwab Raiza Raiza	Ahmer		
2011	Qurbat			
2011	Zindagi Dhoop Tum Ghana Saya			
2011	Tootay Huway Per	Aun/Junaid		
2012	Sabz Qadam			
2012	Meri Saheli Meri Humjoli			
2012	Madiha Maliha	Humayun		
2012–13	Kahi Unkahi	Ansar		
2013	Justuju			
2013–14	Mere Harjai	Saad		
2013–15	Meri Maa	Naveed Shah		
2014	Marium Kaisay Jiye			
2014	Shab e Zindagi			
2014	Mere Apnay			
2014	Kissey Apna Kahein			
2014	Sitara Jahan Ki Betiyaan			
2014–15	Agar Tum Na Hotay			
2015	Aye Zindagi	Ashar		
2015	Mere Dard Ki Tujhe Kia Khabar			
2015–16	Aik Thi Misaal	Ahsan		
2015–16	Saas Bahu			
2016	Mein Sitara	Jamal		
2016	Court Room			
2016–17	Waada			
2017	Pinjra	Chaudhary Mubashir		
2017	Main Akeli			
2017	Dhund	Inspector Uzair		
2017–2018	Aangan	Asim		
2017–2018	Hari Hari Churiyaan	Waqar		
2018	Khudparast	Moiz		
2018	Beti	Taimoor		
2018–19	Babban Khala Ki Betiyann	Asad		
2019	Hania			
2019	Surkh Chandni	Mukhtar		
2020	Soteli Maamta	Baadshah		
2020	Mushk			
2021	Berukhi	Maaz		
2022	Beqadar	Sarmad		
2022–23	Aik Thi Laila	Fareed		
2023	Baby Baji	Nasser	ARY Digital	
2023–24	Tera Waada	Shaheer		
2025	Main Manto Nahi Hoon	SP Ijaz	ARY Digital	
2025	Jama Taqseem	Hameed	Hum TV	

== Awards ==
- 2014: Hum Award for Best Soap Actor – Agar Tum Na Hotay – nom.
