= Montenegrin nobility =

The Montenegrin nobility (1852–1918) are notable people of the Principality of Montenegro and the Kingdom of Montenegro who hold titles such as Veliki Vojvoda (Grand Duke), Knez (Prince), Vojvoda (Duke), Serdar (Count), and Guvernadur (Governor). The titles are hereditary or personal. Focusing on the Montenegrin nobility of the late 19th century surrounding the then recent secularization of the Principality under Danilo II and his court, excluding the older traditional clan nobility.

== History ==
Historically the hereditary Metropolitans or Prince-Bishops of Montenegro (theocratic rulers) had created a governing class that was somewhat similar to nobility in other countries. Petar II Petrović-Njegoš issued a decree creating Prince Alexander Karađorđević (later Alexander I, Prince of Serbia between 1842 and 1858), the younger son of Karađorđe, as Vojvoda (Voivode). During this reign there were fourteen families with the rank of Serdar, namely, Petrović-Njegoš, Vukotić, Đurašković, Martinović, Perović, Plamenatz, Drekalović, Mijušković, Bošković, Božović, Đulović, Medenica, Vlahović and Laketić.

In the diploma creating Nikola Mihailov Vasojević a hereditary Knez, Petar II signed the document in Cetinje as "Prince Petar Petrović-Njegoš, Vladika (Prince-Bishop) and Gospodar (Lord) of Montenegro and Brda". The diploma establishes a noble lineage for the new Prince Nikola Mihailov as a direct descendant of Prince Radonja of Holmia (Brda) (himself raised to the rank of Prince by Stephen Dušan "the Mighty", Emperor of the Serbs and Greeks, in 1346. The diploma is also a grant of arms describing a blazon for the Princes of Holmia and their heirs.

Rade Gvozdenović (1672–1750) was elevated to the rank of hereditary Knez (Prince) following his heroism at the Battle of Tsarev Laz (1712) by Prince-Bishop Danilo I (in which he was himself was wounded).

King Nikola I Petrovic-Njegos, formerly Prince (reigning 1860–1921) deprived disloyal subjects from inheriting the titles of their ancestors; Marko Miljanov Popović, having previously unified his own Kuči clan with Montenegro in 1874, following a fierce disagreement with Prince Nikola in 1882, had to resign the State Council and was deprived of his title of Vojvoda by Prince Nikola.

== Legacy ==
The granting of titles has continued to the present day, under the ongoing fons honorum. In 2001, Prince Nicholas II granted the title Veliki Vojvoda (Grand Voivode) of Grahovo and Zeta to his son, Prince Boris Petrović-Njegoš. Other members of the Royal family and persons close to the dynasty have also received titles of nobility.

== Notable people ==
- Prince (Knez) Mirko Petrović-Njegoš of Montenegro, Grand Duke (Veliki Vojvoda) of Grahovo and Zeta (1879–1918)
- Prince (Knez) Peter Petrović-Njegoš of Montenegro, Grand Duke (Veliki Vojvoda) of Zahumlije (1889–1932)
- Prince (Knez) Boris Petrović-Njegoš of Montenegro, Grand Duke (Veliki Vojvoda) of Grahovo and Zeta (b. 1980)
- Prince (Knez) Anto Gvozdenović (1853–1935), Prince of the Ćeklići clan
- Prince (Knez) Pavle Petrović-Njegoš of Montenegro, Prince (Knez) of Raška (1910–1933)
- Duke (Vojvode) Novica Cerović (1805–1895), Duke of the Drobnjak clan
- Duke (Vojvode) Miloš Krivokapić (1819–1907), Duke of the Cuce clan
- Duke (Vojvode) Stanko Radonjić (1841–1889), Duke of the Njeguši clan
- Duke (Vojvode) Božo Petrović-Njegoš (1846–1929), Duke of the Njeguši clan, member of the Royal House
- Duke (Vojvode) Marko Miljanov Popović (1833–1901), Duke of the Kuči tribe
- Duke (Vojvode) Miljan Vukov Vešović (1820–1886), Duke of the Vasojevići tribe
- Duke (Vojvode) Gavrilo Vuković (1852–1928), Duke of the Vasojevići tribe, son of Duke Miljan
- Count (Serdar) Janko Vukotić (1866–1927)
- Count (Serdar) Milo Martinović
- Guvernadur Vukota Ozrinić, member of Ozrinic tribe
- Prince(Knez) and Duke (Voivoda) Dragoje Raosaljic Ozrinic leader of the Ozrinic Principality
- Prince (Knez) Pero Ozrinic
- Prince (Knez) Kojica Nikolić from Ozrinić tribe
- Prince (Ban) Nenoje Ozrinić
- Duke Peko Pavlov Nikolić from Ozrinić tribe
- Prince (Knez) Jovan Ozrinić
- Prince (Knez) Tomaš Nikolić from Ozrinić tribe
- Senator Jevto M. Nikolić
- Knez Vasko Mušov Nikolić from Ozrinić tribe
- Prince (Knez) Janko Ozrinic, son of Vujo, grandson of Prince Dragoje Ozrinic
