= Arranged marriage =

Marital union organized by parties other than the couple

An arranged marriage is a marriage where the spouses are selected by a third party. The third party is most commonly the spouses' parents, possibly with the aid of a marriage broker.

Normally, the couple agree to the arranged marriage. However, in a forced marriage, one or both of the partners does not consent; and in a child marriage, one or both partners cannot consent because they are under 18 years old. Marriages without consent are condemned by the United Nations.

Arranging marriages has historically been common in many cultures and religious traditions. It remains widespread in certain regions, particularly South Asia, West Asia and North Africa, Central Asia, Southeast Asia, and sub-Saharan Africa. In other parts of the world, such as Europe and East Asia, the practice has declined substantially since the 19th century.

== History ==
Arranged marriages were the norm throughout the world until the 18th century. Typically, marriages were arranged by parents, grandparents or other close relatives and trusted friends. Some historical exceptions are known, such as courtship and betrothal rites during the Renaissance period of Italy and Gandharva Vivah in the Vedic period in the Indian subcontinent.. Arranged marriages have declined in countries where forced marriages were politically outlawed (e.g. Imperial Russia or Japan) or in prosperous countries with more social mobility and increasing individualism; nevertheless, arranged marriages might still be seen in countries of Europe and North America, among royal families, aristocrats and minority religious groups, such as in placement marriage among fundamentalist Mormon groups of the United States. In most other parts of the world, arranged marriages continue to varying degrees and increasingly in quasi-arranged form, along with autonomous marriages.

=== Europe ===
In France arranged marriages were normal until the Second World War.

Courtship and betrothal rites were known during the Renaissance period of Italy

Arranged marriages were the norm in Russia before the early 20th century, most of which were endogamous.

=== America ===
Until the first half of the 20th century, arranged marriages were common in migrant families in the United States. They were sometimes called "picture-bride marriages" among Japanese-American immigrants because the bride and groom knew each other only through the exchange of photographs before the day of their marriage. These marriages among immigrants were typically arranged by parents or close relatives from the country of their origin. As immigrants settled in and melded into a new culture, arranged marriages shifted first to quasi-arranged marriages where parents or friends made introductions and the couple met before the marriage; over time, the marriages among the descendants of these immigrants shifted to autonomous marriages driven by individual's choice, dating and courtship preferences, and an increase in marrying outside of their own ethnic group. Similar historical dynamics are claimed in other parts of the world.

=== Asia ===
In China, arranged marriages (Chinese: 包办婚姻; pinyin: bāobàn hūnyīn)—sometimes called blind marriages (Chinese: 盲婚; pinyin: máng hūn)—were the norm before the mid-20th century. A marriage was a negotiation and decision between parents and other older members of two families. The bride and groom were typically told to get married, without a right to demur, even if they had never met each other until the wedding day.

== Comparison ==
Marriages have been categorized into four groups in scholarly studies:

- Fully arranged marriage: parents or guardians select, the individuals are neither consulted nor have any say before the marriage. A fully arranged marriage is, by definition, a forced marriage.
- Consensual arranged marriage: parents or guardians select, then the individuals are consulted, who consider and consent, and each individual has the power to refuse (although they are often under pressure or coercion to consent); sometimes, the individuals meet—in a family setting or privately—before engagement and marriage as in shidduch custom among Orthodox Jews.
- Self-selected marriage: individuals select, then parents or guardians are consulted, who consider and consent, and where parents or guardians have the power of veto.
- Autonomous marriage: individuals select, the parents or guardians are neither consulted nor have any say before the marriage.

Gary Lee and Lorene Stone suggest that most adult marriages in recent modern history are somewhere on the scale between consensual arranged and autonomous marriage, in part because marriage is a social institution. Similarly, Broude and Greene, after studying 142 cultures worldwide, have reported that 130 cultures have elements of arranged marriage.

Extreme examples of forced arranged marriage have been observed in some societies, particularly in child marriages of girls below age 12. Illustrations include vani which is currently seen in some tribal/rural parts of Pakistan, and Shim-pua marriage in Taiwan before the 1970s (Tongyangxi in China).

=== Types ===
There are many kinds of arranged marriages. Some of these are:

- Arranged exogamous marriage: is one where a third party finds and selects the bride and groom irrespective of their social, economic and cultural group.
- Arranged endogamous marriage: is one where a third party finds and selects the bride and groom from a particular social, economic and cultural group.
- Consanguineous marriage: is a type of arranged endogamous marriage. It is one where the bride and groom share a grandparent or near ancestor. Examples of these include first cousin marriages, uncle-niece marriages, second cousin marriages, and so on. The most common consanguineous marriages are first cousin marriages, followed by second cousin and uncle-niece marriages. Between 25 and 40% of all marriages in parts of Saudi Arabia and Pakistan are first cousin marriages; while overall consanguineous arranged marriages exceed 65% to 80% in various regions of North Africa and Central Asia.

The bride and groom in all of the above types of arranged marriages usually do have the right to consent; if the bride or the groom or both do not have a right to consent, it is called a forced marriage. Forced marriages are not the same as regular arranged marriages; these forced arrangements do not have the full and free consent of both parties. Arranged marriages are commonly associated with religious tradition.

According to The Hindu Marriage Act, 1955 of the Republic of India, non-consensual marriages and marriages where either the bridegroom is below the age of 21 years or the bride is below the age of 18 are prohibited for Hindus, Buddhists, Sikhs and Jains.

Non-consanguineous arranged marriage is one where the bride and groom do not share a grandparent or near ancestor; this type of arranged marriage is common in Hindu and Buddhist South Asia, Southeast Asia, East Asia and Christian Latin America and sub-Saharan Africa. Consanguineous marriages are against the law in many parts of United States and Europe. In the United Kingdom, uncle-niece marriages are considered incestuous and are illegal, but cousin marriages are not forbidden, although there have been calls to ban first-cousin marriages due to health concerns. While consanguineous arranged marriages are common and culturally preferred in many Islamic countries and among migrants from Muslim countries to other parts of the world, they are culturally forbidden or considered undesirable in most Christian, Hindu and Buddhist societies. Consanguineous arranged marriages were also common in a number of Jewish communities before the 20th century, but have declined to less than 10% in modern times.

== Forced vs. arranged marriages ==
Forced and arranged marriages are distinct practices found in various cultures, each defined by different principles and legal implications.

A forced marriage involves coercion, where one or both parties are compelled to marry against their will. This is often achieved through emotional manipulation, threats, or physical violence. Because this practice disregards individual autonomy and genuine consent, it is considered a violation of human rights and frequently leads to profound emotional distress.

In contrast, an arranged marriage involves familial or community intervention to suggest a spouse based on cultural, religious, or social factors. Crucially, in an arranged marriage, the consent of both individuals remains the primary requirement. While the process operates within a framework of societal expectations, the prospective spouses retain their agency and have the final say in the union.

The fundamental difference between these two practices is the presence or absence of free and full consent. Jennifer Burns, Director of Anti-Slavery Australia, clarifies this distinction: "Arranged marriages are widely practised in Australia... but ultimately, the couple decides whether they want to marry. A forced marriage is the opposite. There is no complete and free consent."

=== Enforcement ===
In some communities, especially in rural parts of the Middle East, North Africa, and South Asia, a woman who refuses to go through with an arranged marriage, tries to leave an arranged marriage via divorce, or is suspected of any kind of "immoral" behaviour may be considered to have dishonored her entire family. Male relatives may be ridiculed or harassed, and any of the woman's siblings may find it impossible to enter into a marriage. In these cases, killing the woman is a way for the family to enforce the institution of arranged marriages. Unlike cases of domestic violence, honor killings are often done publicly and there are frequently family members involved in the act.

=== Arranged matchmaking in India ===
For matchmakers, traditionally called nayan, in India it is customary for them to be a family friend or a distant relative. Some people however do not prefer to use a matchmaker. As stated by Santana Flanigan, "Some families with marriageable age children may prefer not to approach possible matches with a marriage proposal because communication between families could break down, and could result in accidental disrespect between the two families." This person is a neutral matchmaker when families are trying to plan an arranged marriage. The nayan usually has two roles that they play: one is as a marriage scout and the other is as a negotiator. As a marriage scout, the matchmaker goes out into the community and tries to find a potential match for the person who wants to get married. As a negotiator, the matchmaker talks to different families and tries to come to a common ground about a potential arranged marriage between two families. While going about this process the matchmaker takes into account several different considerations including but not limited to family background, financial status, and family reputation. Once the nayan finds a match they will get in contact with the families and start to arrange communication between the future couple. Communication starts strictly from the matchmaker to the two people and their families. Eventually, families will begin to communicate with each other while also allowing the new couple to communicate with one another. After the families have talked about the marriage and made wedding plans the matchmakers come back to help in the process of the wedding. The help offered by the nayan can come in the form of jewelry or wedding setup. Usually, the matchmaker does not receive any pay for the work that they have done but will often be given gifts from the families of the new couple.

== Causes and prevalence ==
Over human history through modern times, the practice of arranged marriages has been encouraged by a combination of factors, such as the practice of child marriage, late marriage, tradition, culture, religion, poverty and limited choice, disabilities, wealth and inheritance issues, politics, social and ethnic conflicts.

=== Child marriage ===
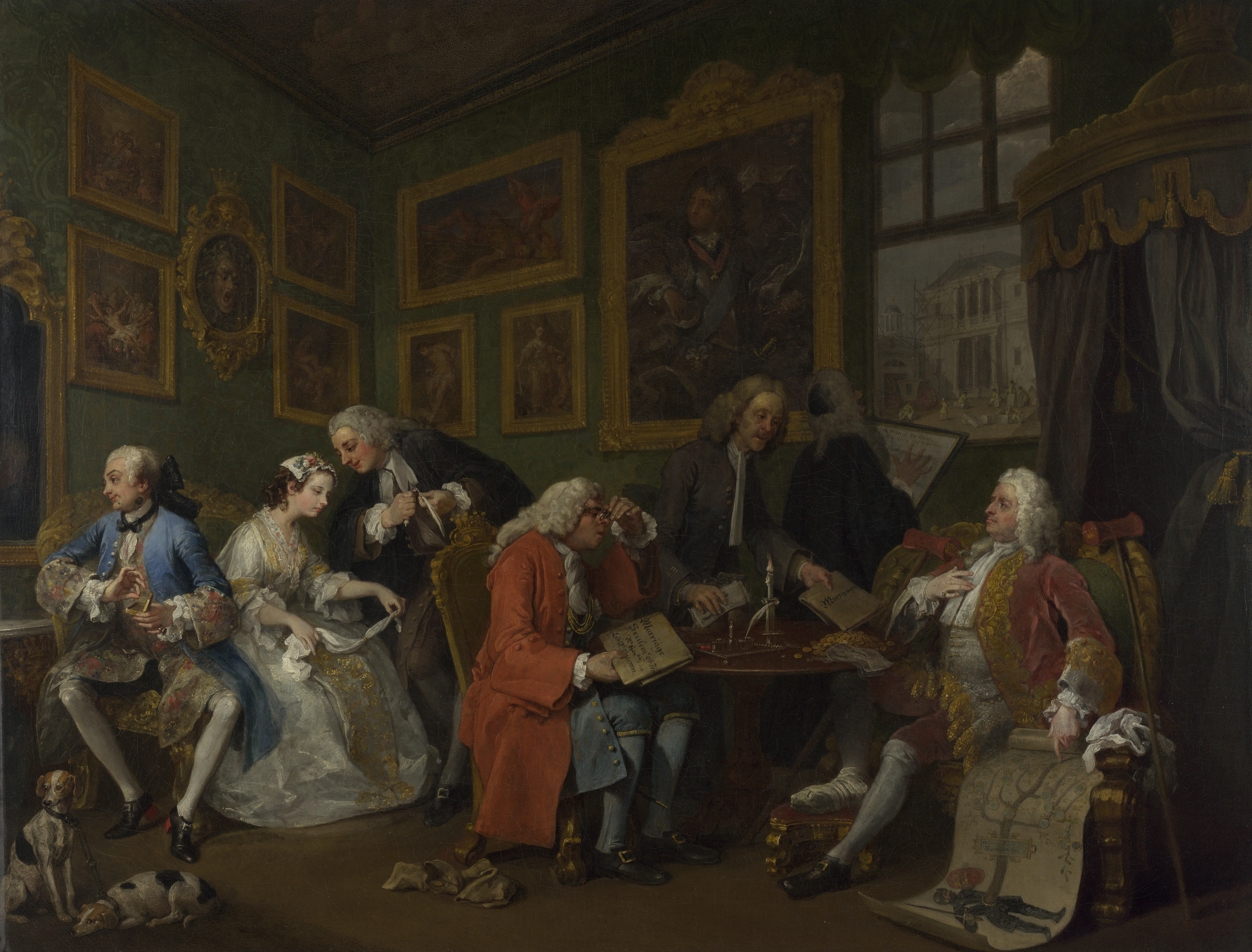
"Marriage à-la-mode" by William Hogarth: a satire on arranged marriages and prediction of ensuing disaster

Child marriage does not prepare or provide the individual much opportunity to make an informed, free choice about matrimony. They are implicitly arranged marriages. In rural areas of East Asia, Sub-Saharan Africa, South Asia and Latin America, poverty and lack of options, such as being able to attend school, leave little choice to children other than be in early arranged marriages. Child marriages are primarily seen in areas of poverty. Parents arrange child marriages to ensure their child's financial security and reinforce social ties. They believe it offers protection and reduces the daughter's economic burden on the family due to how costly it is to feed, clothe and (optionally) educate a girl. By marrying their daughter to a good family, the parents improve their social status by establishing a social bond between each other.

According to Warner, in nations with the high rates of child marriages, the marriage of the girl is almost always arranged by her parents or guardians. The nations with the highest rates of arranged child marriages are: Niger, Chad, Mali, Bangladesh, Guinea, Central African Republic, Afghanistan, Yemen, India and Pakistan. Arranged child marriages are also observed in parts of the Americas.

=== Poverty ===
In impoverished communities, every adult mouth to feed becomes a continuing burden. In many of these cultures, women have difficulty finding gainful employment (or are simply prohibited from doing so), and their daughters become the greatest burden to the family. Some scholars argue that arranging a marriage of a daughter becomes a necessary means to reduce this burden. Poverty therefore is a consequent driver of arranged marriage.

This theory is supported by the observed rapid drop in arranged marriages in fast growing economies of Asia. The financial benefit parents receive from their working single daughters has been cited as a reason for their growing reluctance to see their daughters marry at too early an age.

=== Late marriage ===
Late marriage, particularly past the age of 35 years old, reduces the pool of available women for autonomous marriages. Introductions and arranged marriages become a productive option.

For example, in part due to economic prosperity, about 40% of modern Japanese women reach the age of 29 and have never been married. To assist late marriages, the traditional custom of arranged marriages called miai-kekkon is re-emerging. It involves the prospective bride and groom, family, friends and a matchmaker (nakōdo, 仲人); the pair is selected by a process with the individuals and family involved (iegara, 家柄). Typically the couple meets three times, in public or private, before deciding if they want to get engaged.

=== Limited choices ===
Migrant minority ethnic populations have limited choice of partners, particularly when they are stereotyped, segregated or avoided by the majority population. This encourages homogamy and arranged marriages within the ethnic group. Examples of this dynamic include Sikh marriages between 1910 and 1980 in Canada, arranged marriages among Hasidic Jews, and arranged marriages among Japanese American immigrants before the 1960s, who would travel back to Japan to marry the spouse arranged by the family, and then return married. In other cases, a girl from Japan would arrive in the United States as a picture bride, pre-arranged to marry the Japanese American man on arrival, whom she had never met.

=== Custom ===
Arranged marriage may be the consequence of certain customs. For example, in rural and tribal parts of Pakistan and Afghanistan, disputes, unpaid debts in default and crimes such as murder are settled by a council of village elders, called jirga. A typical punishment for a crime committed by males involves requiring the guilty family to marry their virgin girls between 5 and 12 year old to the other family. This custom requires no consent from the girl, or even her parents. Such arranged child marriages are called vani, swara and sak in different regional languages of Pakistan.

Another custom in certain Islamic nations, such as Pakistan, is watta satta, where a brother-sister pair of one family are swapped as spouses for a brother-sister pair of another family. In other words, the wife is also the sister-in-law for the males in two families. This custom inherently leads to arranged form of marriage. About 30% of all marriages in western rural regions of Pakistan are by custom watta-satta marriages, and 75% of these Muslim marriages are between cousins and other blood relatives. Some immigrant families prefer customary practice of arranged marriage.

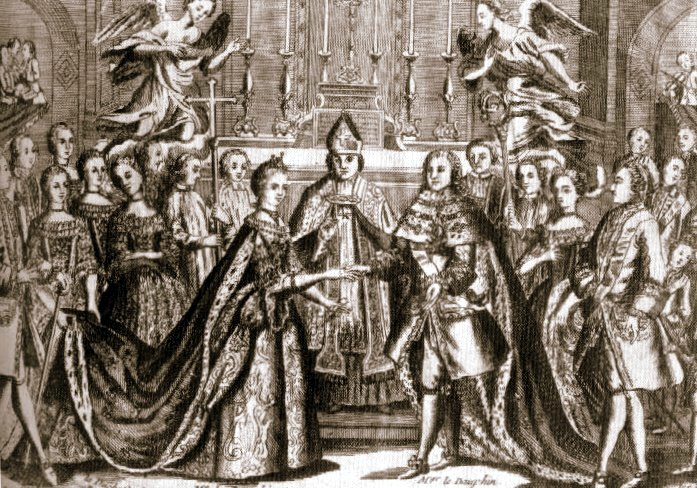
In 1770, Empress Maria Theresa sent 14-year-old Maria Antonia to France to marry Louis-Auguste

=== Politics ===
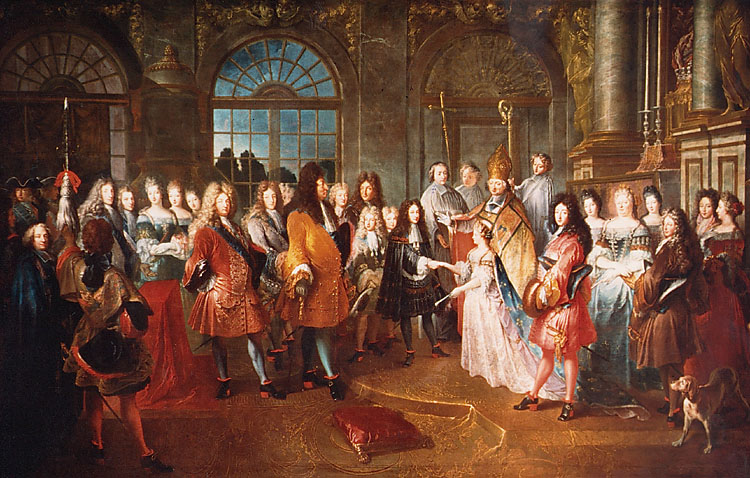
The arranged marriage in 1697, of Marie Adélaïde of Savoy, age 12 to Louis, Duke of Burgundy, heir apparent to the throne of France, as a result of the Treaty of Turin (1696). The marriage created an alliance between Louis XIV of France and the Duke of Savoy.

Arranged marriages across feudal lords, city states and kingdoms, as a means of establishing political alliances, trade and peace were common in human history. When a king married his son to a neighboring state's daughter, it indicated an alliance among equals, and signaled the former's state superiority. For example, the fourth daughter of Maria Theresa, Archduchess of Austria and Queen of Hungary, Marie Antoinette, married the dauphin (crown prince) of France, who would become King Louis XVI.

== Examples ==
=== Wealth and inheritance issues ===
Throughout most of human history, marriage has been a social institution that produced children and organized inheritance of property from one generation to next. Various cultures, particularly some wealthy royals and aristocratic families, arranged marriages in part to conserve or streamline the inheritance of their wealth.

Tongyangxi, also known as Shim-pua marriage in Taiwanese—literally child or little daughter-in-law—was a tradition of arranged marriage, in which a poor family would arrange and marry a pre-adolescent daughter into a richer family as a servant. The little girl provided slave-like free labor, and also the daughter-in-law to the adoptive family's son. This sort of arranged marriage, in theory, enabled the girl to escape poverty and the wealthy family to get free labor and a daughter-in-law. Zhaozhui was a related custom by which a wealthy family that lacked an heir would arrange marriage of a boy child from another family. The boy would move in with the wealthy family, take on the surname of the new family, and marry the family's daughter. Such arranged marriages helped maintain inheritance bloodlines. Similar matrilocal arranged marriages to preserve wealth inheritance were common in Korea, Japan and other parts of the world.

=== Dowries in India ===
A dowry is a gift of money, property, or valuable items gifted to a groom by the bride's family after marriage. As stated by Santana Flanigan, "Dowries originally started as 'love' gifts after the marriages of upper caste individuals, but during the medieval period the demands for dowries became a precursor for marriage." The dowry system, apart from being sexist, also has other negative side effects. In many instances, the families of women can not afford to put up a dowry for their daughters. This can cause the daughter not to get married which in turn, in severe cases, can lead to suicide or depression. When a family can not afford a dowry for their daughters, this as well can make the daughter feel like a financial burden to the family. As a result of these negative side effects, a law was passed in 1961. This law was called the Dowry Prohibition Act of 1961 and was passed in India. The Act of 1961 made it illegal for a family to demand, give, or take a dowry, and if caught, they could be punished by law. However, this act has some loose knots in terms of its rules. It is stated that the couple is allowed to have a wedding present in the form of money, clothes, or other things that do not count as a dowry. It also states that if a family does decide to give a dowry, it does not invalidate the marriage and no legal issues will be taken unless they get caught. Therefore, giving a dowry is illegal by law but many people still find ways to give them. They found these ways by finding the loopholes in The Dowry Prohibition Act of 1961. For example, the family will gift gifts of large sums of money to the couple as a wedding gift, this money to some, may be seen as a dowry, and since giving money as a wedding gift is allowed this may be considered a loophole. According to Lodhia at Britannica, "In 1984…it was changed to specify that presents given to a bride or a groom at the time of a wedding are allowed." This correction to The Dowry Prohibition Act of 1961 made things more specific. The corrections made it so that when the married couple received wedding gifts they had to document the gift, who gave it to them, the relation of the person to the couple, and how much the gift was worth. This made it easier to track if a couple did receive a dowry versus if it was a wedding gift. After 1984 even more additions were made. In the Indian Penal Code modifications were made to help female victims of dowry-related violence. Dowry-related violence is when the groom's family demands a dowry from the bride's family before, during, or after the marriage. These acts of violence only affect the women in the marriage and can often be very brutal. According to The Advocates For Human Rights, "The most common forms of dowry-related violence are physical violence, marital rape, acid attacks, and wife burning (where a woman is covered in kerosene or some other accelerant and deliberately set on fire)." These violent attacks result from the bride's family not wanting to or being unable to pay a dowry that the groom's family has demanded.

=== Bride-wealth ===
In many cultures, particularly in parts of Africa and the Middle East, daughters are valuable on the marriage market because the groom and his family have to (not must) pay cash or property for the right to marry the daughter. This is referred to as "bride-wealth" or by various names such as "lobola" and "wine carrying". The bride-wealth is typically kept by the bride's family, after the marriage, and is a source of income to poor families. The brother(s), father, and male relatives of the bride typically take keen interest in arranging her marriage to a man who is willing to pay the most wealth in exchange for the right to marry her.

=== Religion ===
Some religious denominations recognize marriages only within the faith. Of the major religions of the world, Islam forbids marriage of girls of a devout parent to a man who does not belong to that religion. In other words, Islam forbids marriage of Muslim girls to non-Muslim men, and the religious punishment for those who marry outside might be severe. This is one of the motivations of arranged marriages in Islamic minority populations in Europe.

Arranged marriage is practiced by members of the Apostolic Christian Church, an Anabaptist denomination of Christianity:

The marriage process in the Apostolic Christian Church begins with a brother in the faith deciding that it is time for him to be married. The brother makes it a matter of prayer that God will show him who is to be his wife. Once a sister in the faith is selected the brother speaks to his father about it. With the father's blessing the brother then takes his proposal to the Elder, or leader, of his local church. If the local Elder feels the request is reasonable and that the brother's spiritual life is in order, he will forward the request to the Elder of the prospective bride's church. If this Elder feels that the request is reasonable and that their spiritual lives are in order, then the proposal is forwarded to the father of the prospective bride. If the father is in agreement then the proposal is forwarded to the sister in the faith. She is to them make it a matter of prayer to determine if it is God's will that she marry this brother in the faith. If she agrees, then the proposal is announced to their respective home churches. Marriages generally follow short engagement periods, as strict church discipline, including excommunication, is applied to those who have premarital relations.

Since religion is important in the Hindu community, parents often find spouses that have the same religion for their children. When two people with different religions fall in love, one must convert to the other's religion, forsaking their own. It is socially unacceptable for people to intermarry, which is why parents arranging a marriage for their children will make sure they marry someone from the same faith. Hindus favor religious segregation, so many of them do not keep friendships with those from other religions. A study shows that 45% of Hindus only have friends who have the same religion as them and 13% have friends with different religions. This trains children to only desire to be around those of the same religion since intermingling of religious friendships and marriages are not too common. Furthermore, the people must marry within their caste system and most have a specific type of religion. They are taught this from a young age and it is considered one of the most important rules. When love outside of a person's caste happens, the parents sometimes threaten to kill the lover.

== Controversy ==
Arranged marriages are actively debated amongst scholars, as many question whether arranged marriages are being used to abuse the international immigration system. Arranged marriages can also be seen as an inherent violation to human rights—particularly women's rights. Scholars often wonder if arranged marriages are more stable and suitable for raising children, and question whether the married couple can still experience a loving, respectful relationship.

=== Sham marriages ===
In the United Kingdom, public discussion has questioned whether international arranged marriages are carried out without the couple's intention to live together. They suspect that some arranged marriages are born out of the intention to gift residency and European citizenship to immigrants who would otherwise be denied a visa to enter the country. These fears have been further stoked by observed divorces once the minimum married residence period requirement is met. MP Ann Cryer has alleged examples of such abuse by West Asian Muslim families in her motion to the UK's House of Commons. The United States has seen a similar controversy with sham arranged marriages.

=== Human rights ===
Various international organizations, including UNICEF, have campaigned for laws to ban arranged marriages of children, as well as forced marriages. Article 15 and 16 of The Convention on the Elimination of All Forms of Discrimination Against Women (CEDAW) specifically cover marriage and family law, which support such a ban.

Arranged marriages are a matter of debate and disagreements. Activists, such as Charlotte Bunch, suggest that marriages arranged by parents and other family members typically assume heterosexual preference and involve emotional pressure; this drives some individuals into marriages that they consent to under duress. Bunch suggests that all marriages should be autonomous.

In contrast, preventing arranged marriages may harm many individuals who want to get married and can benefit from parental participation in finding and selecting a mate. For example, Willoughby suggests that arranged marriages work because they remove anxiety from the process of finding a spouse. Parents, families, and friends provide an independent perspective when they participate in learning and evaluating the other person's history and behavior, as well as the couple's mutual compatibility. Willoughby further suggests that parents and family members provide more than input in the screening and selection process; often, they provide financial support for the wedding, housing, emotional support, and other valuable resources for the couple as they navigate married life, like childcare.

Michael Rosenfeld asserts that the differences between autonomous marriages and arranged marriages are empirically small; many people meet, date, and choose to marry or cohabit with those who are similar in background, age, interests and social class they feel most similar to—screening factors most parents would have used for them anyway. Assuming the pool from which mates are screened and selected is large, Rosenfeld suggests that the differences between the two approaches to marriages are not as great as some imagine them to be. Others have expressed sentiments similar to Rosenfeld.

=== Laws in the United States ===
The United States has laws about arranged and forced marriages. According to the United States Citizenship and Immigration Services, "forced marriage can happen to individuals of any race, ethnicity, religion, gender, sex, age, immigration status, or national origin. It can happen to individuals from any economic or educational background." This usually happens because of religious, cultural, or social status reasons. In most cases, the families of both parties feel that the two people should get married for many different reasons, but the participants who are to be married do not want to get married. In the United States, forced marriages are not permitted at all and can be grounds for prosecution. According to The United States Citizenship and Immigration Services, "...in all U.S. states, people who force someone to marry may be charged with violating state laws, including those against domestic violence, child abuse, rape, assault, kidnapping, threats of violence, stalking, or coercion." In an arranged marriage, the families of the individuals help to choose the marriage partner but overall will not force marriage upon anyone if they do not want to get married. The role of family members and their degree of involvement, therefore, is often used to distinguish between an arranged marriage and a forced marriage. For forced marriages, the family plays a part in choosing the individual the person will marry, and the participant has no agency in the matter. The United States Government is against forced marriage and sees it as a human rights abuse.

=== Stability ===
The lowest divorce rates in the world are in cultures with high rates of arranged marriages such as the Hindus of India (3%), and Ultra-Orthodox Jews of Israel (7%). According to a 2012 study by Statistic Brain, 53.25% of marriages are arranged worldwide. The global divorce rate for arranged marriages was 6.3%, which could be an indicator for the success rate of arranged marriages. This has led scholars to ask if arranged marriages are more stable than autonomous marriages, and whether this stability matters. Others suggest that the low divorce rate may not reflect stability, but that it instead illustrates the difficulty of the divorce process. Furthermore, individuals may experience social ostracism upon divorce, leading them to choose to live in a dysfunctional marriage rather than face the consequences of a divorce. Also, the perception of high divorce rates attributed to self-arranged marriages in the United States is being called into question.

=== Love and respect in arranged versus autonomous marital life ===
Various small sample surveys have been performed to ascertain if arranged marriages or autonomous marriages have a more satisfying married life. The results are mixed—some state marriage satisfaction is higher in autonomous marriages, while others find no significant differences. Johnson and Bachan have questioned the small sample size and conclusions derived from them.

Scholars ask whether love and respect in marital life is greater in arranged marriages than autonomous marriages. Epstein suggests that, in many arranged marriages, love emerges over time. Neither autonomous nor arranged marriages offer any guarantees. Many arranged marriages also end up being cold and dysfunctional as well, with reports of abuse.

In some cultures where arranged marriages are common, there is a higher inequality between men and women. Some believe that those in arranged marriages might have a more satisfying union, since they have realistic expectations and are not clouded by emotion when going into the marriage; others believe the arrangement can lead to unhappiness and discontentment in the marriage. Although people who are in autonomous marriages may look at arranged marriages as forced, results have shown that many people enter arranged marriages of their own free will. According to one study, the divorce rate was 4% for arranged marriages, while in the U.S., 40% of autonomous marriages ended in divorce. There have also been questions about sexual gratification; in Japan, it was reported that the men in arranged marriages were more sexually satisfied, while in autonomous marriages, the partners experienced roughly the same amount of satisfaction.

== See also ==
- Arranged marriage in the Indian subcontinent
- Blessing ceremony of the Unification Church
- Bride kidnapping
- Child marriage in the United States
- Coercion
- Lavender marriage – Marriage to feign heterosexuality for both spouses
- Log Kya Kahenge
- Mail-order bride
- Marriage of convenience
- Marriage of state
- Marriage in Pakistan
- Marriage in South Korea
- Marriage market
- Marriageable age
- Married at First Sight – Reality television franchise
- Matrimonial websites
- Miai – Arranged marriages in Japan
- Picture Bride
- Polygamy
- Redorer son blason
- Royal intermarriage
- Shotgun wedding – Wedding following premarital pregnancy
