= Gentry =

People of high social class, in particular of the land-owning social class

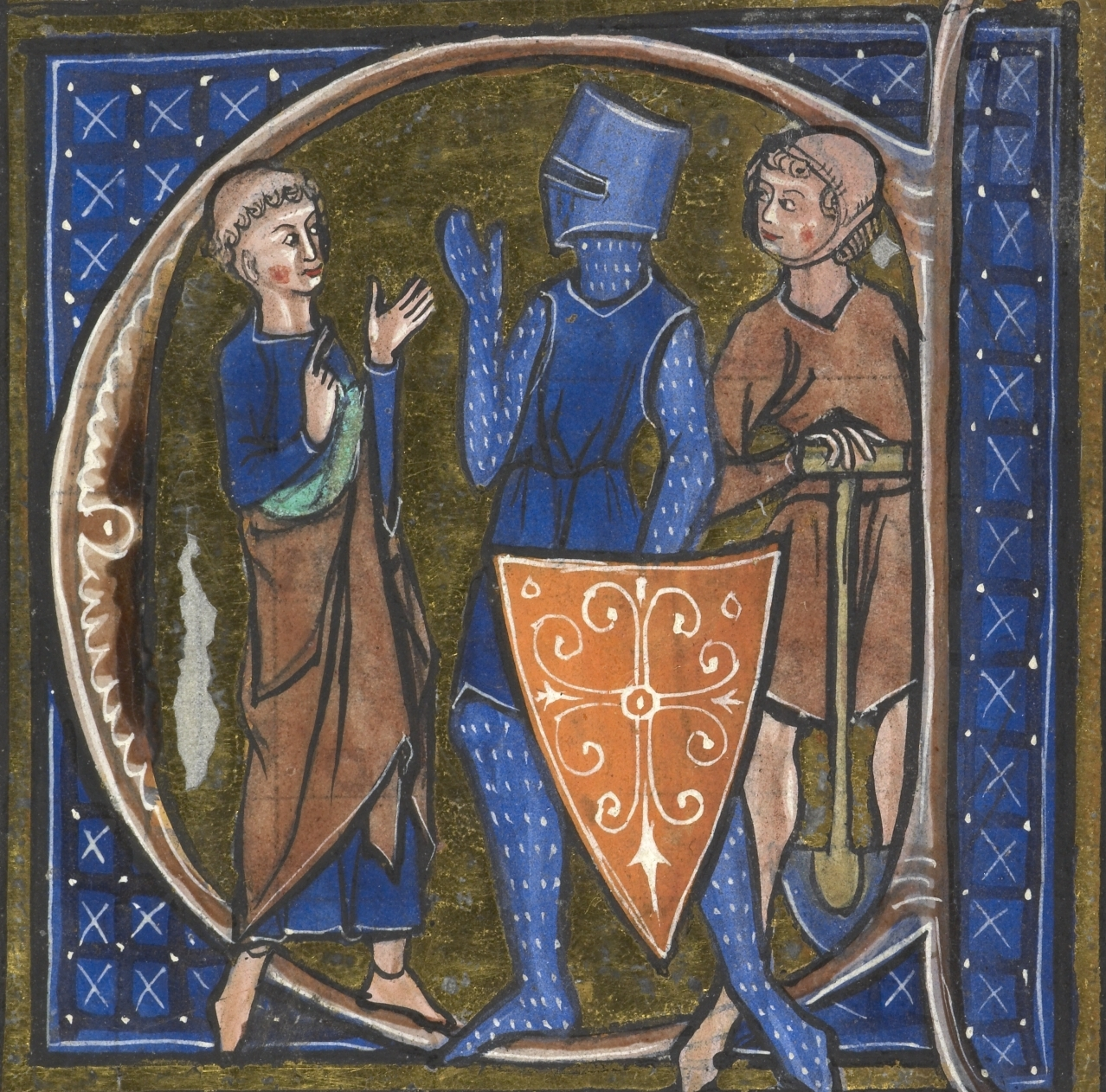
Cleric, knight, and peasant archetypes represent the virtues of prudence, fortitude, and temperance, respectively. In classical antiquity and Christendom, prudence and fortitude were seen as the cardinal virtues that should govern society.

Gentry (from Old French genterie, from gentil 'high-born, noble') are "well-born, genteel and well-bred people" of high social class, especially in the past. Gentry, in its widest connotation, refers to people of good social position connected to landed estates (see manorialism), upper levels of the clergy, or long established "gentle" families of noble descent, some of whom in some cases never obtained the official right to bear a coat of arms. The gentry largely consisted of landowners who were supported entirely through rental income or at least had a country estate; some were gentleman farmers.

In the United Kingdom gentry specifically refers to the landed gentry: the majority of the land-owning social class who typically had a coat of arms but did not hold a peerage. The adjective "patrician" ("of or like a person of high social rank") describes comparable elite groups in other analogous traditional social elite strata based in cities, such as the free cities of Italy (Venice and Genoa) and the free imperial cities of Germany, Switzerland and the Hanseatic League. (Note: Following the admired example of the Roman patrician, the Venetian patrician reverted, especially in the Renaissance, to a life more focused on his rural estate.) The term "gentry" by itself, the historian Peter Coss argues, is a broad construct applied by scholars to different societies, sometimes in ways that do not fully align with historical realities. Whilst no single model perfectly fits every society, some scholars favour a unified term to describe these upper social strata.

== Historical background of social stratification in the West ==
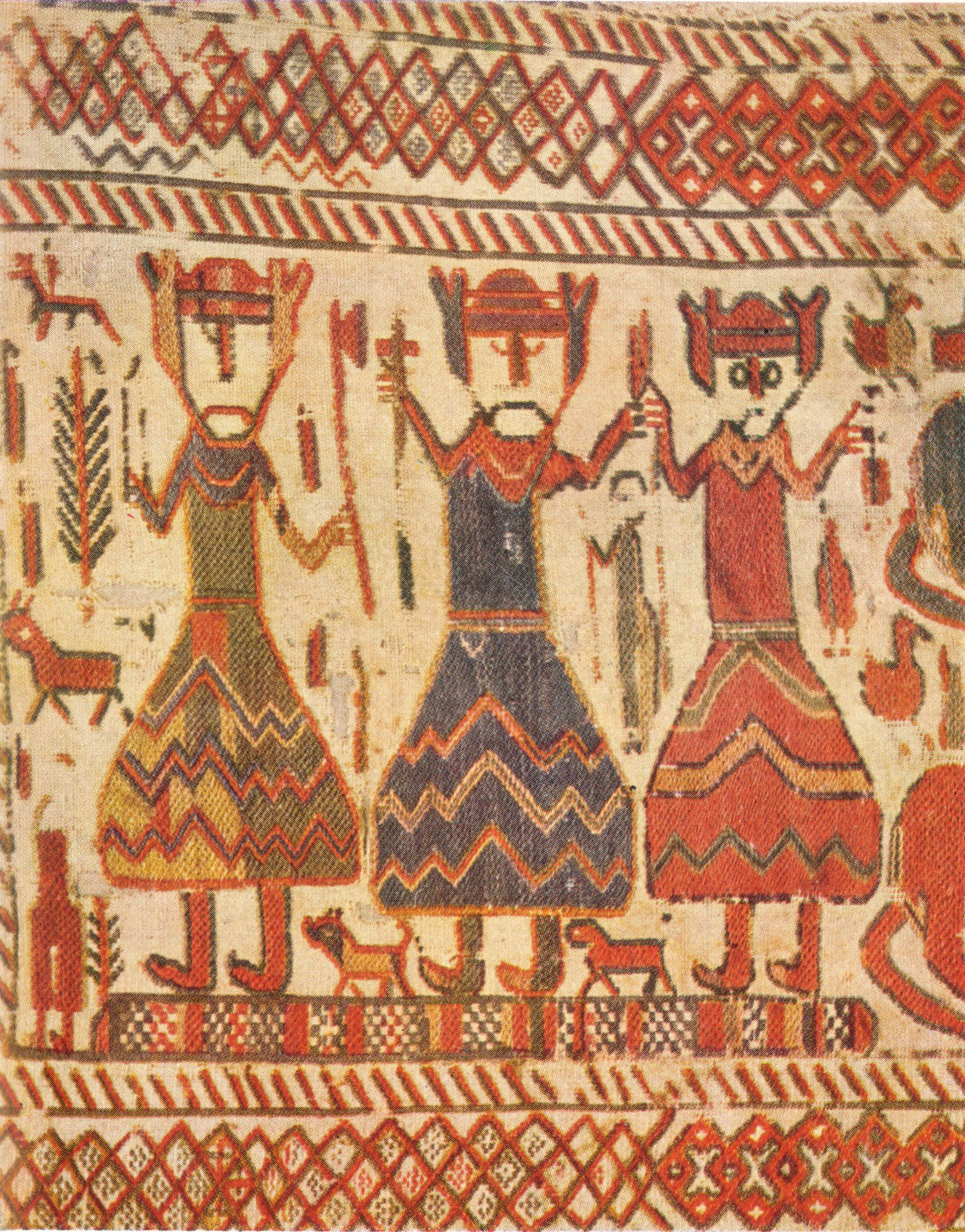
This part of a 12th-century Swedish tapestry has been interpreted to show, from left to right, the one-eyed Odin, the hammer-wielding Thor and Freyr. This triad corresponds closely to the trifunctional division: Odin is the patron of priests and magicians, Thor of warriors, and Freyr of fertility and farming.

The Proto-Indo-Europeans who settled Europe, Central and Western Asia and the Indian subcontinent conceived their societies to be ordered (not divided) in a tripartite fashion, the three parts being castes. Castes came to be further divided, perhaps as a result of greater specialisation.

The "classic" formulation of the caste system as largely described by Georges Dumézil was that of a priestly or religiously occupied caste, a warrior caste, and a worker caste. Dumézil divided Proto-Indo-European society into three categories: sovereignty, military and productivity (see Trifunctional hypothesis). He further subdivided sovereignty into two distinct and complementary sub-parts. One part was formal, juridical, and priestly, but rooted in this world. The other was powerful, unpredictable and also priestly, but rooted in the "other", the supernatural and spiritual world. The second main division was connected with the use of force, the military and war. Finally, there was a third group, ruled by the other two, whose role was productivity: herding, farming and crafts.

This system of caste roles can be seen in the castes which flourished on the Indian subcontinent and amongst the Italic peoples.

Examples of the Indo-European castes:

- Indo-Iranian – Brahmin/Athravan, Kshatriyas/Rathaestar, Vaishyas
- Celtic – Druids, Equites, Plebes (according to Julius Caesar)
- Slavic – Volkhvs, Voin, Krestyanin/Smerd
- Anglo-Saxon – Gebedmen (prayer-men), Fyrdmen (army-men), Weorcmen (workmen) (according to Alfred the Great)

Kings were born out of the warrior or noble class, and sometimes the priesthood class, like in India.

=== Medieval Christendom ===
The feudal social structure in three orders: those who pray (oratores), fight (bellatores) and work (laboratores)

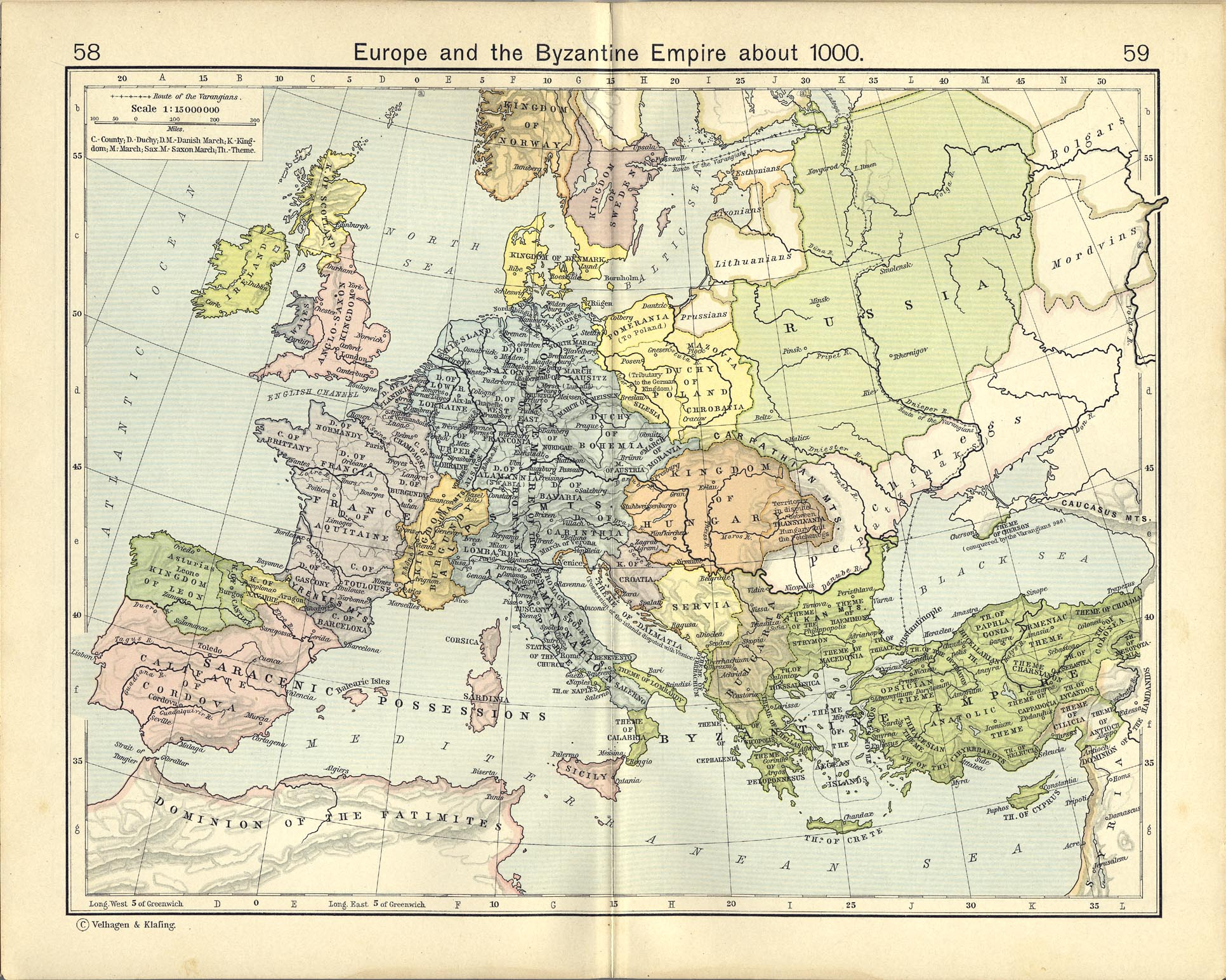
Europe and the Byzantine Empire 1000 AD

Constantine the Great, who was Roman emperor from AD 306 to 337, convoked the First Council of Nicaea in 325, whose Nicene Creed included belief in "one holy catholic and apostolic Church". The emperor Theodosius I made Nicene Christianity the state church of the Roman Empire with the Edict of Thessalonica of 380.

After the fall of the Western Roman Empire in the 5th century, there emerged no single powerful secular government in the West, but there was a central ecclesiastical power in Rome, the Catholic Church. In this power vacuum the Church rose to become the dominant power in the West for the start of this time period.

In essence, the earliest vision of Christendom was a vision of a Christian theocracy, a government founded upon and upholding Christian values, whose institutions are spread through and over with Christian doctrine. The Catholic Church's peak of authority over all European Christians and their common endeavours of the Christian community—for example, the Crusades, the fight against the Moors in the Iberian Peninsula and against the Ottomans in the Balkans—helped to develop a sense of communal identity against the obstacle of Europe's deep political divisions.

The classical heritage flourished throughout the Middle Ages in both the Byzantine Greek East and Latin West. In Plato's ideal state there are three major classes (producers, auxiliaries and guardians), which was representative of the idea of the "tripartite soul", which is expressive of three functions or capacities of the human soul: "appetites" (or "passions"), "the spirited element" and "reason" the part that must guide the soul to truth. Will Durant made the case that certain prominent features of Plato's ideal community were discernible in the organization, dogma and effectiveness of "the" Medieval Church in Europe:

For a thousand years Europe was ruled by an order of guardians considerably like that which was visioned by our philosopher. During the Middle Ages it was customary to classify the population of Christendom into laboratores (workers), bellatores (soldiers), and oratores (clergy). The last group, though small in number, monopolized the instruments and opportunities of culture, and ruled with almost unlimited sway half of the most powerful continent on the globe. The clergy, like Plato's guardians, were placed in authority ... by their talent as shown in ecclesiastical studies and administration, by their disposition to a life of meditation and simplicity, and ... by the influence of their relatives with the powers of state and church. In the latter half of the period in which they ruled [800 AD onwards], the clergy were as free from family cares as even Plato could desire [for such guardians] ... [Clerical] Celibacy was part of the psychological structure of the power of the clergy; for on the one hand they were unimpeded by the narrowing egoism of the family, and on the other their apparent superiority to the call of the flesh added to the awe in which lay sinners held them. ...

Gaetano Mosca wrote on the same subject matter in his book The Ruling Class concerning the Medieval Church and its structure that

Beyond the fact that Clerical celibacy functioned as a spiritual discipline it also was guarantor of the independence of the Church.

the Catholic Church has always aspired to a preponderant share in political power, it has never been able to monopolize it entirely, because of two traits, chiefly, that are basic in its structure. Celibacy has generally been required of the clergy and of monks. Therefore no real dynasties of abbots and bishops have ever been able to establish themselves. ... Secondly, in spite of numerous examples to the contrary supplied by the warlike Middle Ages, the ecclesiastical calling has by its very nature never been strictly compatible with the bearing of arms. The precept that exhorts the Church to abhor bloodshed has never dropped completely out of sight, and in relatively tranquil and orderly times it has always been very much to the fore.

=== Two principal estates of the realm ===
The fundamental social structure in Europe in the Middle Ages was between the ecclesiastical hierarchy, nobles i.e. the tenants in chivalry or their descendants (counts, barons, knights, esquires, gentlemen) and the ignobles, the franklins, villeins, citizens, and burgesses. The division of society into classes of nobles and ignobles, in the smaller regions of medieval Europe was inexact. After the Protestant Reformation, social intermingling between the noble class and the hereditary clerical upper class became a feature in the monarchies of Nordic countries. The gentility is primarily formed on the bases of the medieval societies' two higher estates of the realm, nobility and clergy, both exempted from taxation. Subsequent "gentle" families of long descent who never obtained official rights to bear a coat of arms were also admitted to the rural upper-class society: the gentry.

The three estates

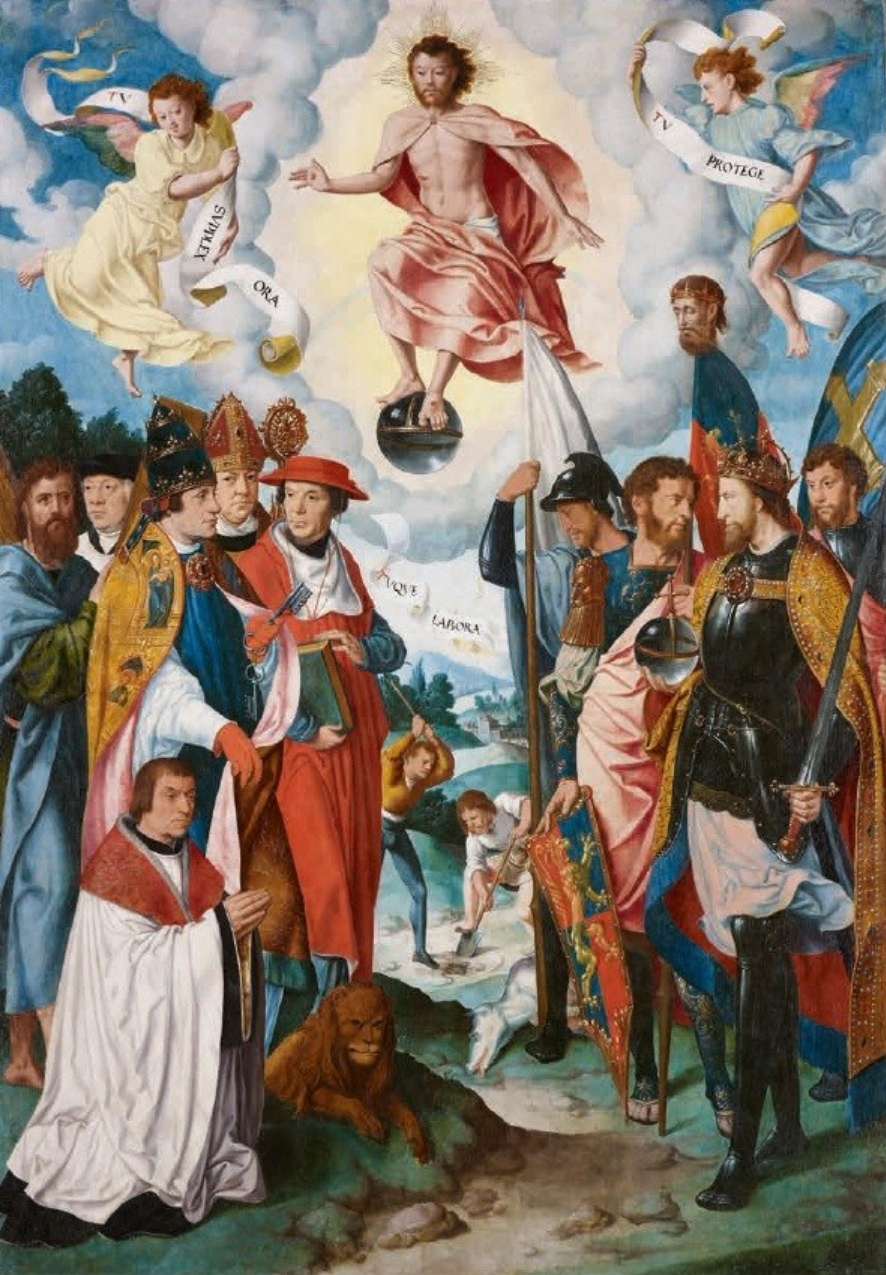
The Three Estates of Christendom by Bartholomäus Bruyn c. 1535

The widespread three estates order was particularly characteristic of France:

- First estate included the group of all clergy, that is, members of the higher clergy and the lower clergy.
- Second estate has been encapsulated by the nobility. Here too, it did not matter whether they came from a lower or higher nobility or if they were impoverished members.
- Third estate included all nominally free citizens; in some places, free peasants.

At the top of the pyramid were the princes and estates of the king or emperor, or with the clergy, the bishops and the pope.

The feudal system was, for the people of the Middle Ages and early modern period, fitted into a God-given order. The nobility and the third estate were born into their class, and change in social position was slow. Wealth had little influence on what estate one belonged to. The exception was the Medieval Church, which was the only institution where competent men (and women) of merit could reach, in one lifetime, the highest positions in society.

The first estate comprised the entire clergy, traditionally divided into "higher" and "lower" clergy. Although there was no formal demarcation between the two categories, the upper clergy were, effectively, clerical nobility, from the families of the second estate or as in the case of Cardinal Wolsey, from more humble backgrounds.

The second estate was the nobility. Being wealthy or influential did not automatically make one a noble, and not all nobles were wealthy and influential (aristocratic families have lost their fortunes in various ways, and the concept of the "poor nobleman" is almost as old as nobility itself). Countries without a feudal tradition did not have a nobility as such.

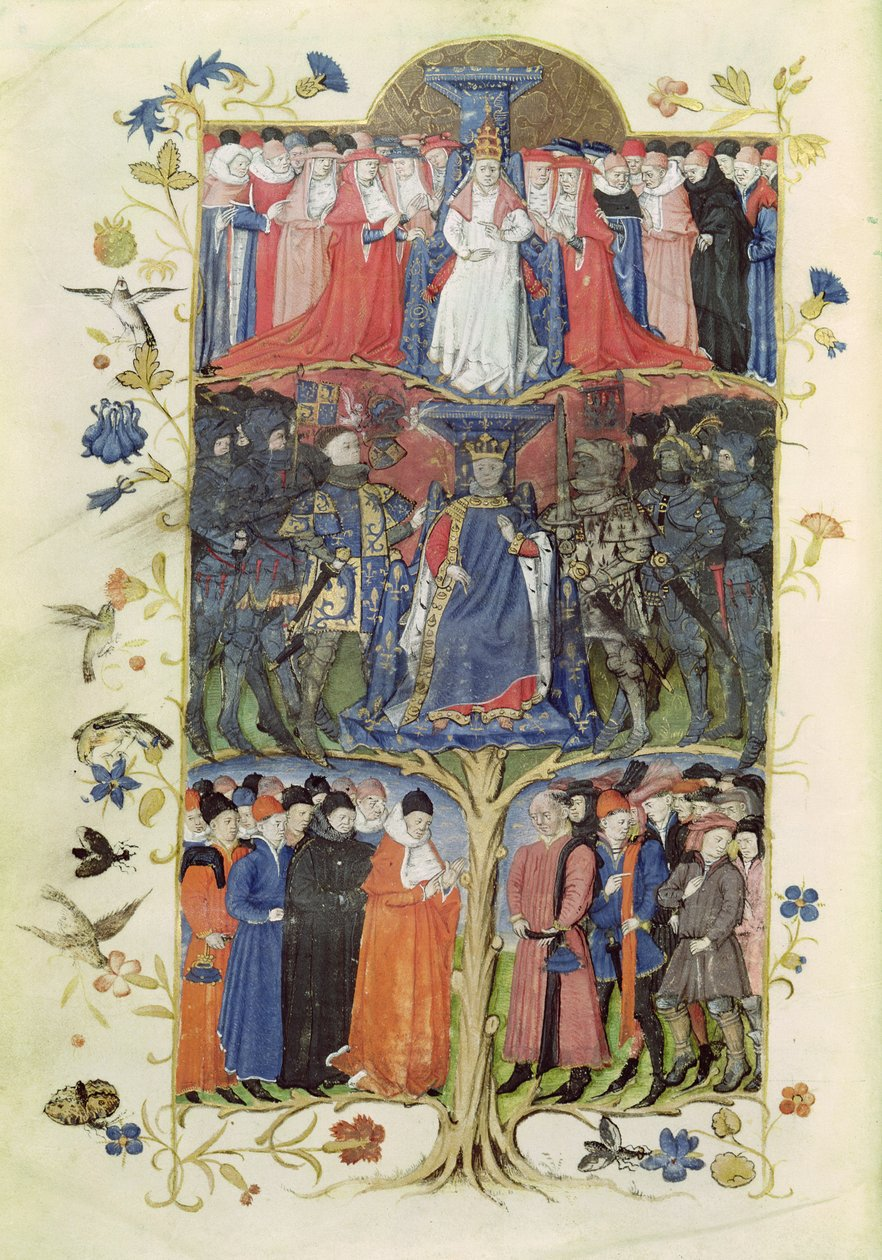
The traditional social stratification of the Western world in the 15th century

The nobility of a person might be either inherited or earned. Nobility in its most general and strict sense is an acknowledged preeminence that is hereditary: legitimate descendants (or all male descendants, in some societies) of nobles are nobles, unless explicitly stripped of the privilege. The terms aristocrat and aristocracy are a less formal means to refer to persons belonging to this social milieu.

Historically in some cultures, members of an upper class often did not have to work for a living, as they were supported by earned or inherited investments (often real estate), although members of the upper class may have had less actual money than merchants. Upper-class status commonly derived from the social position of one's family and not from one's own achievements or wealth. Much of the population that comprised the upper class consisted of aristocrats, ruling families, titled people, and religious hierarchs. These people were usually born into their status, and historically, there was not much movement across class boundaries. This is to say that it was much harder for an individual to move up in class simply because of the structure of society.

In many countries, the term upper class was intimately associated with hereditary land ownership and titles. Political power was often in the hands of the landowners in many pre-industrial societies (which was one of the causes of the French Revolution), despite there being no legal barriers to land ownership for other social classes. Power began to shift from upper-class landed families to the general population in the early modern age, leading to marital alliances between the two groups, providing the foundation for the modern upper classes in the West. Upper-class landowners in Europe were often also members of the titled nobility, though not necessarily: the prevalence of titles of nobility varied widely from country to country. Some upper classes were almost entirely untitled, for example, the Szlachta of the Polish-Lithuanian Commonwealth.

Before the Age of Absolutism, institutions, such as the church, legislatures, or social elites, restrained monarchical power. Absolutism was characterized by the ending of feudal partitioning, consolidation of power with the monarch, rise of state, rise of professional standing armies, professional bureaucracies, the codification of state laws, and the rise of ideologies that justify the absolutist monarchy. Hence, Absolutism was made possible by innovations and characterized as a phenomenon of Early Modern Europe, rather than that of the Middle Ages, where the clergy and nobility counterbalanced as a result of mutual rivalry.

== Gentries ==
=== Continental Europe ===
==== Baltic ====
From the middle of the 1860s the privileged position of Baltic Germans in the Russian Empire began to waver. Already during the reign of Nicholas I (1825–55), who was under pressure from Russian nationalists, some sporadic steps had been taken towards the russification of the provinces. Later, the Baltic Germans faced fierce attacks from the Russian nationalist press, which accused the Baltic aristocracy of separatism, and advocated closer linguistic and administrative integration with Russia.

Social division was based on the dominance of the Baltic Germans, who formed the upper classes, while the majority of the indigenous populations, called Undeutsch ("non-German"), composed the peasantry. In the Imperial census of 1897, 98,573 Germans (7.58% of total population) lived in the Governorate of Livonia, 51,017 (7.57%) in the Governorate of Curonia, and 16,037 (3.89%) in the Governorate of Estonia. The social changes faced by the emancipation, both social and national, of the Estonians and Latvians were not taken seriously by the Baltic German gentry. The provisional government of Russia after 1917 revolution gave the Estonians and Latvians self-governance which meant the end of the Baltic German era in Baltics.

The Lithuanian gentry consisted mainly of Lithuanians who, due to strong ties to Poland, had been culturally Polonized. After the Union of Lublin in 1569, they became less distinguishable from Polish szlachta, though they did preserve Lithuanian national awareness.

==== Kingdom of Hungary ====
In Hungary during the late 19th and early 20th century gentry (sometimes spelled as dzsentri) were nobility without land who often sought employment as civil servants, army officers, or went into politics.

==== Polish–Lithuanian Commonwealth ====
In the history of the Polish–Lithuanian Commonwealth, "gentry" is often used in English to describe the Polish landed gentry (Polish: ziemiaństwo, ziemianie, from ziemia, "land"). They were the lesser members of the nobility (the szlachta), contrasting with the much smaller but more powerful group of "magnate" families (sing. magnat, plural magnaci in Polish), the Magnates of Poland and Lithuania. Compared to the situation in England and some other parts of Europe, these two parts of the overall "nobility" to a large extent operated as different classes, and were often in conflict. After the Partitions of Poland, at least in the stereotypes of 19th-century nationalist lore, the magnates often made themselves at home in the capitals and courts of the partitioning powers, while the gentry remained on their estates, keeping the national culture alive.

From the 15th century, only the szlachta, and a few patrician burghers from some cities, were allowed to own rural estates of any size, as part of the very extensive szlachta privileges. These restrictions were reduced or removed after the Partitions of Poland, and commoner landowners began to emerge. By the 19th century, there were at least 60,000 szlachta families, most rather poor, and many no longer owning land. By then the "gentry" included many non-noble landowners.

==== Spain and Portugal ====
In Spanish nobility and former Portuguese nobility, see hidalgos and infanzones.

==== Swedish ====
In Sweden, there was no outright serfdom. Hence, the gentry was a class of well-off citizens that had grown from the wealthier or more powerful members of the peasantry. The two historically legally privileged classes in Sweden were the Swedish nobility (Adeln), a rather small group numerically, and the clergy, which were part of the so-called frälse (a classification defined by tax exemptions and representation in the diet).

At the head of the Swedish clergy stood the Archbishop of Uppsala since 1164. The clergy encompassed almost all the educated men of the day and furthermore was strengthened by considerable wealth, and thus it came naturally to play a significant political role. Until the Reformation, the clergy was the first estate but was relegated to the secular estate in the Protestant North Europe.

In the Middle Ages, celibacy in the Catholic Church had been a natural barrier to the formation of an hereditary priestly class. After compulsory celibacy was abolished in Sweden during the Reformation, the formation of a hereditary priestly class became possible, whereby wealth and clerical positions were frequently inheritable. Hence the bishops and the vicars, who formed the clerical upper class, would frequently have manors similar to those of other country gentry. Hence continued the medieval Church legacy of the intermingling between noble class and clerical upper class and the intermarriage as the distinctive element in several Nordic countries after the Reformation.

Surnames in Sweden can be traced to the 15th century, when they were first used by the Gentry (Frälse), i.e., priests and nobles. The names of these were usually in Swedish, Latin, German or Greek.

The adoption of Latin names was first used by the Catholic clergy in the 15th century. The given name was preceded by Herr (Sir), such as Herr Lars, Herr Olof, Herr Hans, followed by a Latinized form of patronymic names, e.g., Lars Petersson Latinized as Laurentius Petri. Starting from the time of the Reformation, the Latinized form of their birthplace (Laurentius Petri Gothus, from Östergötland) became a common naming practice for the clergy.

In the 17th and 18th centuries, the surname was only rarely the original family name of the ennobled; usually, a more imposing new name was chosen. This was a period which produced a myriad of two-word Swedish-language family names for the nobility (very favored prefixes were Adler, "eagle"; Ehren – "ära", "honor"; Silfver, "silver"; and Gyllen, "golden"). The regular difference with Britain was that it became the new surname of the whole house, and the old surname was dropped altogether.

==== Ukraine ====
The Western Ukrainian Clergy of the Ukrainian Greek Catholic Church were a hereditary tight-knit social caste that dominated western Ukrainian society from the late eighteenth until the mid-20th centuries, following the reforms instituted by Joseph II, Holy Roman Emperor. Because, like their Eastern Orthodox brethren, Ukrainian Catholic priests could marry, they were able to establish "priestly dynasties", often associated with specific regions, for many generations. Numbering approximately 2,000–2,500 by the 19th century, priestly families tended to marry within their group, constituting a tight-knit hereditary caste. In the absence of a significant native nobility and enjoying a virtual monopoly on education and wealth within western Ukrainian society, the clergy came to form that group's native aristocracy. The clergy adopted Austria's role for them as bringers of culture and education to the Ukrainian countryside. Most Ukrainian social and political movements in Austrian-controlled territory emerged or were highly influenced by the clergy themselves or by their children. This influence was so great that western Ukrainians were accused of wanting to create a theocracy in western Ukraine by their Polish rivals. The central role played by the Ukrainian clergy or their children in western Ukrainian society would weaken somewhat at the end of the 19th century but would continue until the mid-20th century.

=== United States ===
The American gentry were rich landowning members of the American upper class in the colonial South.

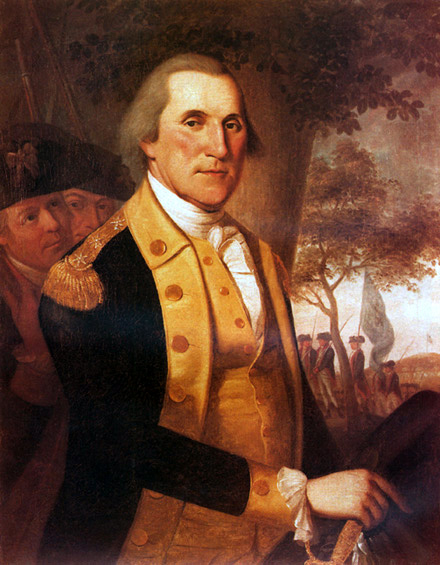
George Washington

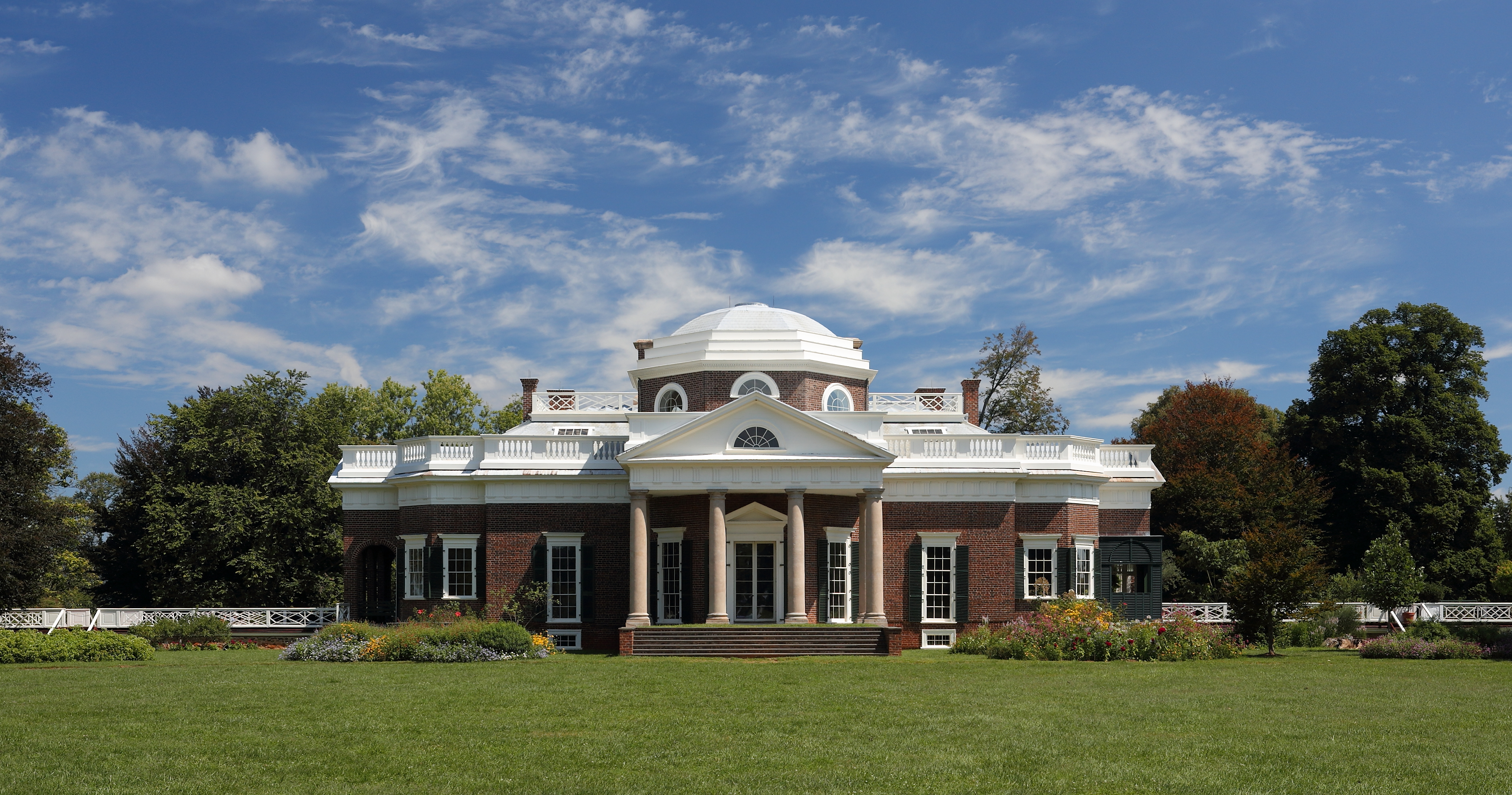
Thomas Jefferson's home, Monticello, in Virginia, was the seat of his plantation.

The Colonial American use of gentry was not common. Historians use it to refer to rich landowners in the South before 1776. Typically large scale landowners rented out farms to white tenant farmers. North of Maryland, there were few large comparable rural estates, except in the Dutch domains in the Hudson Valley of New York.

=== Great Britain ===
The British upper classes consist of two sometimes overlapping entities, the peerage and landed gentry. In the British peerage, only the senior family member (typically the eldest son) inherits a substantive title (duke, marquess, earl, viscount, baron); these are referred to as peers or lords. The rest of the nobility form part of the "landed gentry" (abbreviated "gentry"). The members of the gentry usually bear no titles but can be described as esquire or gentleman. Exceptions are the eldest sons of peers, who bear their fathers' inferior titles as "courtesy titles" (but for Parliamentary purposes count as commoners), Scottish barons (who bear the designation Baron of X after their name) and baronets (a title corresponding to a hereditary knighthood). Scottish lairds do not have a title of nobility but may have a description of their lands in the form of a territorial designation that forms part of their name.

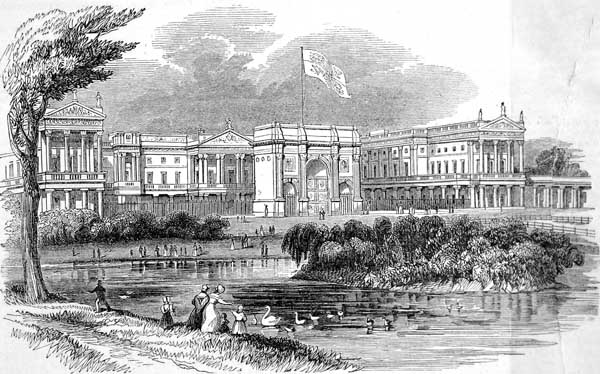
Buckingham Palace

The landed gentry is a traditional British social class consisting of gentlemen in the original sense; that is, those who owned land in the form of country estates to such an extent that they were not required to actively work, except in an administrative capacity on their own lands. The estates were often (but not always) made up of tenanted farms, in which case the gentleman could live entirely off rent income. Gentlemen, ranking below esquires and above yeomen, form the lowest rank of British nobility. It is the lowest rank to which the descendants of a Knight, Baronet or Peer can sink. Strictly speaking, anybody with officially matriculated English or Scottish arms is a gentleman and thus noble.

The term landed gentry, although originally used to mean nobility, came to be used for the lesser nobility in England around 1540. Once identical, these terms eventually became complementary. The term gentry by itself, as commonly used by historians, according to Peter Coss, is a construct applied loosely to rather different societies. Any particular model may not fit a specific society, yet a single definition nevertheless remains desirable. Titles, while often considered central to the upper class, are not strictly so. Both Captain Mark Phillips and Vice Admiral Sir Timothy Laurence, the respective first and second husbands of Anne, Princess Royal, lacked any rank of peerage at the time of their marriage to Princess Anne. However, the backgrounds of both men were considered to be essentially patrician, and they were thus deemed suitable husbands for a princess.

Esquire (abbreviated Esq.) is a term derived from the Old French word "escuier" (which also gave equerry) and is in the United Kingdom the second-lowest designation for a nobleman, referring only to males, and used to denote a high but indeterminate social status. The most common occurrence of term Esquire today is the conferral as the suffix Esq. in order to pay an informal compliment to a male recipient by way of implying gentle birth. In the post-medieval world, the title of esquire came to apply to all men of the higher landed gentry; an esquire ranked socially above a gentleman but below a knight. In the modern world, where all men are assumed to be gentlemen, the term has often been extended (albeit only in very formal writing) to all men without any higher title. It is used post-nominally, usually in abbreviated form (for example, "Thomas Smith, Esq.").

A knight could refer to either a medieval tenant who gave military service as a mounted man-at-arms to a feudal landholder, or a medieval gentleman-soldier, usually high-born, raised by a sovereign to privileged military status after training as a page and squire (for a contemporary reference, see British honours system). In formal protocol, Sir is the correct styling for a knight or for a baronet, used with (one of) the knight's given name(s) or full name, but not with the surname alone. The equivalent for a woman who holds the title in her own right is Dame; for such women, the title Dame is used as Sir for a man, never before the surname on its own. This usage was devised in 1917, derived from the practice, up to the 17th century (and still also in legal proceedings), for the wife of a knight. The wife of a knight or baronet is now styled "Lady [husband's surname]".

==== Historiography ====
The "Storm over the gentry" was a major historiographical debate among scholars that took place in the 1940s and 1950s regarding the role of the gentry in causing the English Civil War of the 17th century. R. H. Tawney had suggested in 1941 that there was a major economic crisis for the nobility in the 16th and 17th centuries, and that the rapidly rising gentry class was demanding a share of power. When the aristocracy resisted, Tawney argued, the gentry launched the civil war. After heated debate, historians generally concluded that the role of the gentry was not especially important.

=== Irish ===
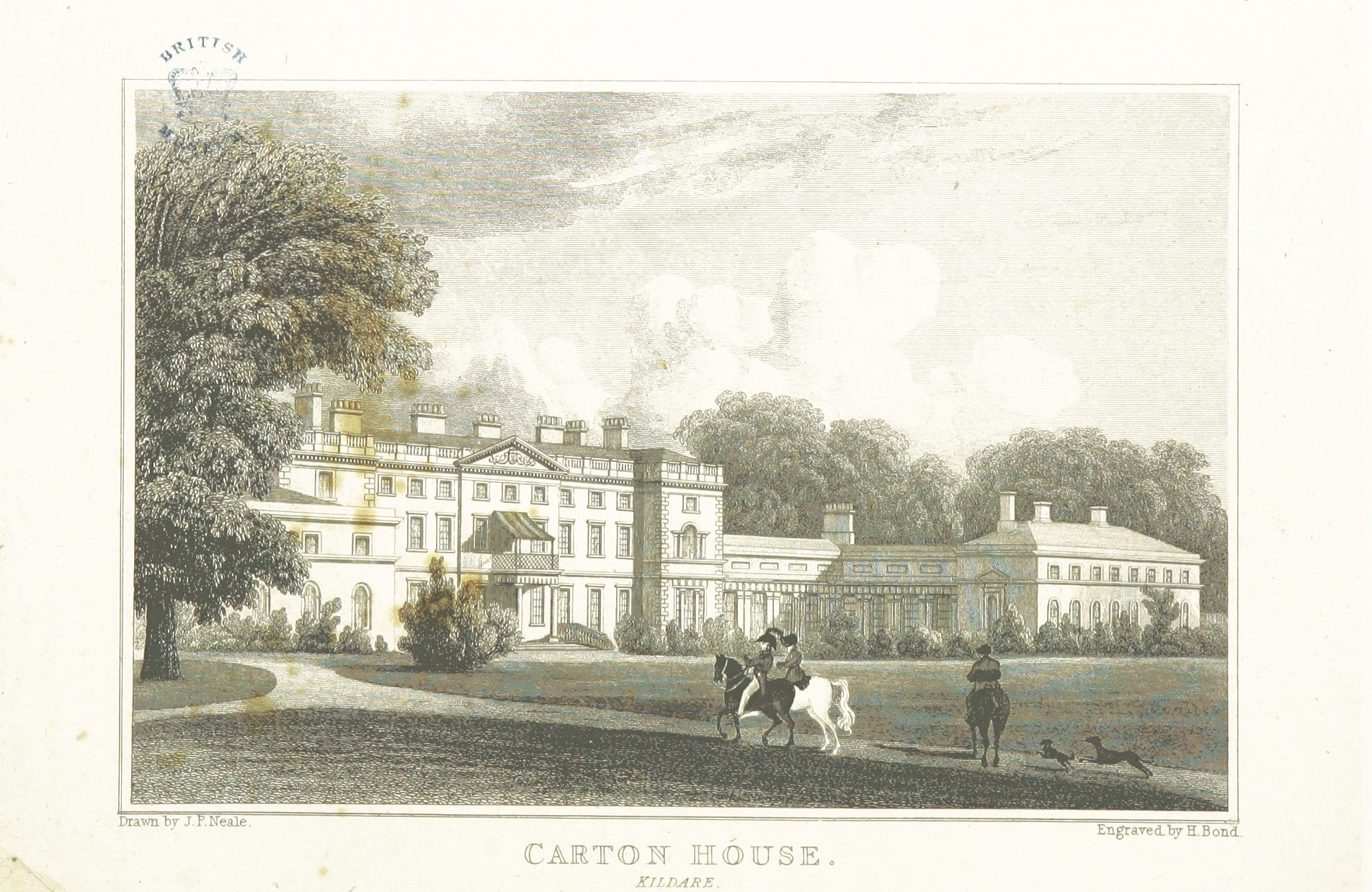
Carton House castle of Fitzgeralds

The Irish gentry, often referred to as the Anglo-Irish Ascendancy, emerged as a dominant landowning class during British rule in Ireland. Comprising Protestant elites, they held significant political and social influence while overseeing vast estates. The Irish gentry also played a key role in shaping cultural and literary traditions, as seen with families like the Fitzgeralds and Butlers. However, their prominence waned after Irish independence and land reforms.

=== East Asia ===
==== China ====
The 'four divisions of society' refers to the model of society in ancient China and was a meritocratic social class system in China and other subsequently influenced Confucian societies. The four occupational categories—gentry, farmers, artisans and merchants—are combined to form the term Shìnónggōngshāng (士農工商).

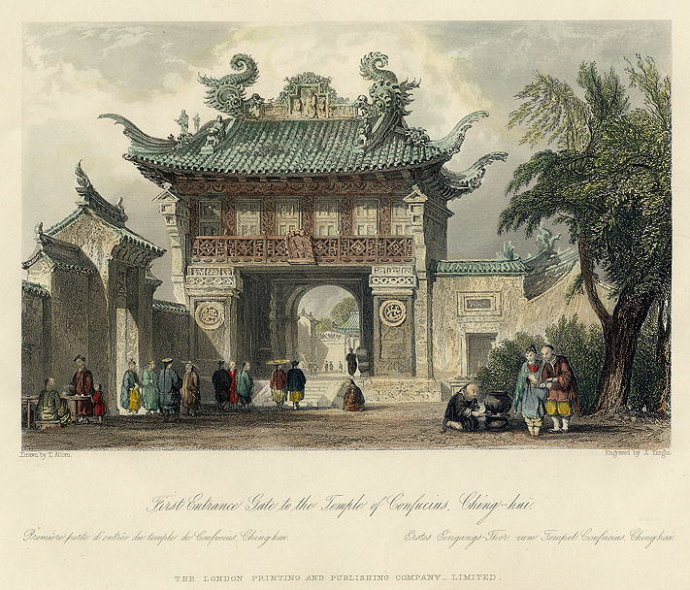
First Entrance Gate of the Temple of Confucius Ching-hai

Gentry (士) means different things in different countries. In China, Korea, and Vietnam, this meant that the Confucian scholar gentry that would – for the most part – make up most of the bureaucracy. This group would comprise both the more-or-less hereditary aristocracy as well as the meritocratic scholars that rise through the rank by public service and, later, by imperial exams. Some sources, such as Xunzi, list farmers before the gentry, based on the Confucian view that they directly contributed to the welfare of the state. In China, the farmer lifestyle is also closely linked with the ideals of Confucian gentlemen.

In Japan, this caste essentially equates to the samurai class.

==== Hierarchical structure of Feudal Japan ====
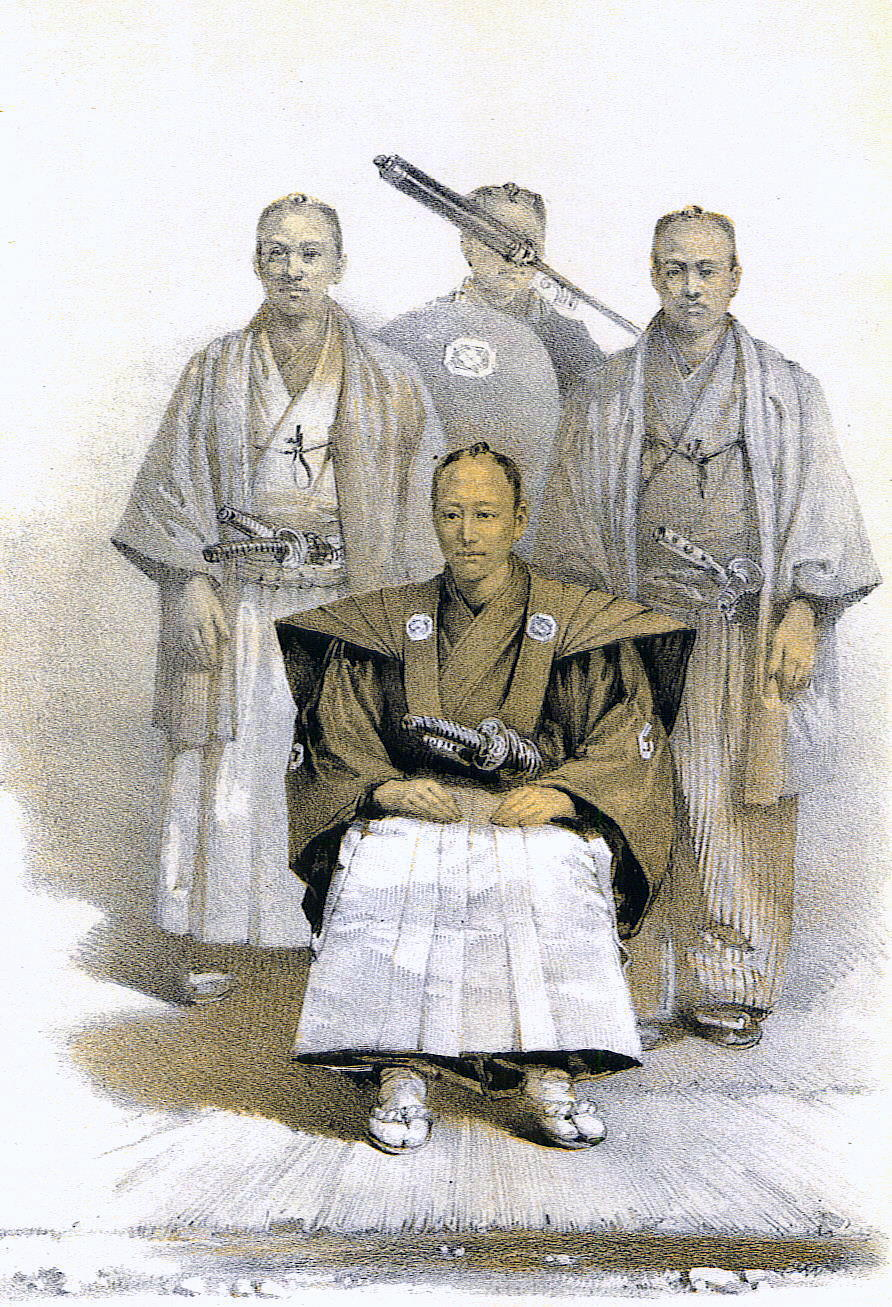
Matsue daimyō (c. 1850s)

There were two leading classes, i.e. the gentry, in the time of feudal Japan: the daimyō and the samurai. The Confucian ideals in the Japanese culture emphasised the importance of productive members of society, so farmers and fishermen were considered of a higher status than merchants.

In the Edo period, with the creation of the Domains (han) under the rule of Tokugawa Ieyasu, all land was confiscated and reissued as fiefdoms to the daimyōs.

The small lords, the samurai (武士, bushi), were ordered either to give up their swords and rights and remain on their lands as peasants or to move to the castle cities to become paid retainers of the daimyōs. Only a few samurai were allowed to remain in the countryside; the landed samurai (郷士, gōshi). Some 5 per cent of the population were samurai. Only the samurai could have proper surnames, something that after the Meiji Restoration became compulsory to all inhabitants (see Japanese name).

Emperor Meiji abolished the samurai's right to be the only armed force in favor of a more modern, Western-style, conscripted army in 1873. Samurai became Shizoku (士族), but the right to wear a katana in public was eventually abolished along with the right to execute commoners who paid them disrespect.

In defining how a modern Japan should be, members of the Meiji government decided to follow in the footsteps of the United Kingdom and Germany, basing the country on the concept of noblesse oblige. Samurai were not to be a political force under the new order. The difference between the Japanese and European feudal systems was that European feudalism was grounded in Roman legal structure while Japan feudalism had Chinese Confucian morality as its basis.

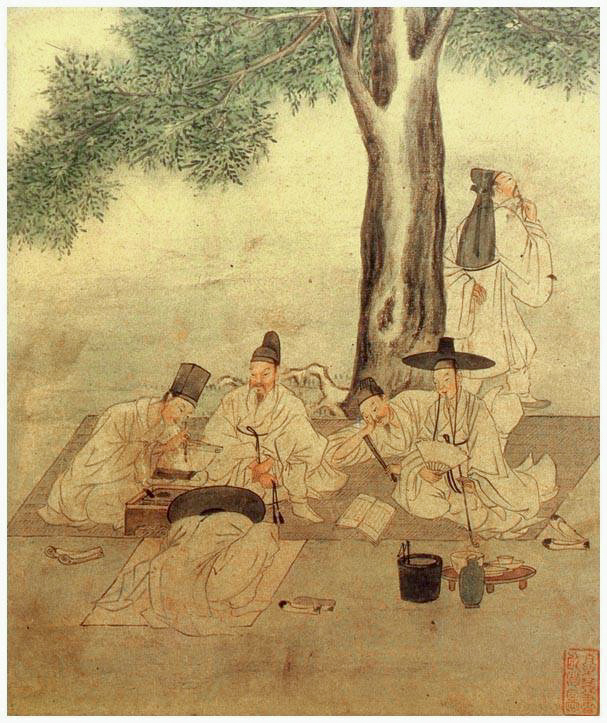
Group of Seonbi (virtuous scholars) in Korea that followed confucian precepts, c. 18th century painting

==== Korea ====
Korean monarchy and the native ruling upper class existed in Korea until the end of the Japanese occupation. The system concerning the nobility is roughly the same as that of the Chinese nobility.

As the monastical orders did during Europe's Dark Ages, the Buddhist monks became the purveyors and guardians of Korea's literary traditions while documenting Korea's written history and legacies from the Silla period to the end of the Goryeo dynasty. Korean Buddhist monks also developed and used the first movable metal type printing presses in history—some 500 years before Johannes Gutenberg—to print ancient Buddhist texts. Buddhist monks also engaged in record keeping, food storage and distribution, as well as the ability to exercise power by influencing the Goryeo royal court.

==== Ottoman Middle East ====
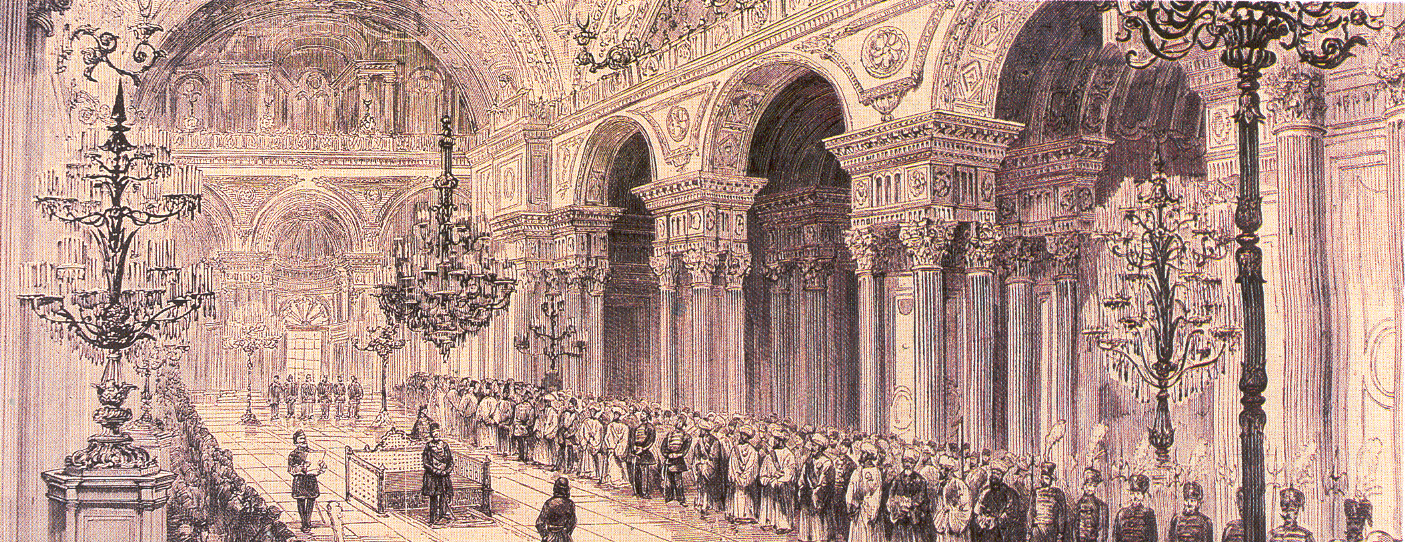
Opening ceremony of the First Ottoman Parliament at the Dolmabahce Palace in 1876

In the Ottoman Middle East, the gentry consisted of notables, or a'yan. The a'yan consisted of two groups: urban and rural gentries. Urban elites were traditionally made of city-dwelling merchants (tujjar), clerics ('ulema), ashraf, military officers, and governmental functionaries. The rural notability's ranks included rural sheikhs and village or clan mukhtars. Most notables originated in, and belonged to, the fellahin (peasantry) class, forming a lower-echelon land-owning gentry in the Empire's post-Tanzimat countryside and emergent towns. In Palestine, rural notables form the majority of Palestinian elites, although certainly not the richest. Rural notables took advantage of changing legal, administrative and political conditions, and global economic realities, to achieve ascendancy using households, marriage alliances and networks of patronage. Over all, they played a leading role in the development of modern Palestine and other countries well into the late 20th century.

== Values and traditions ==
=== Military and clerical ===
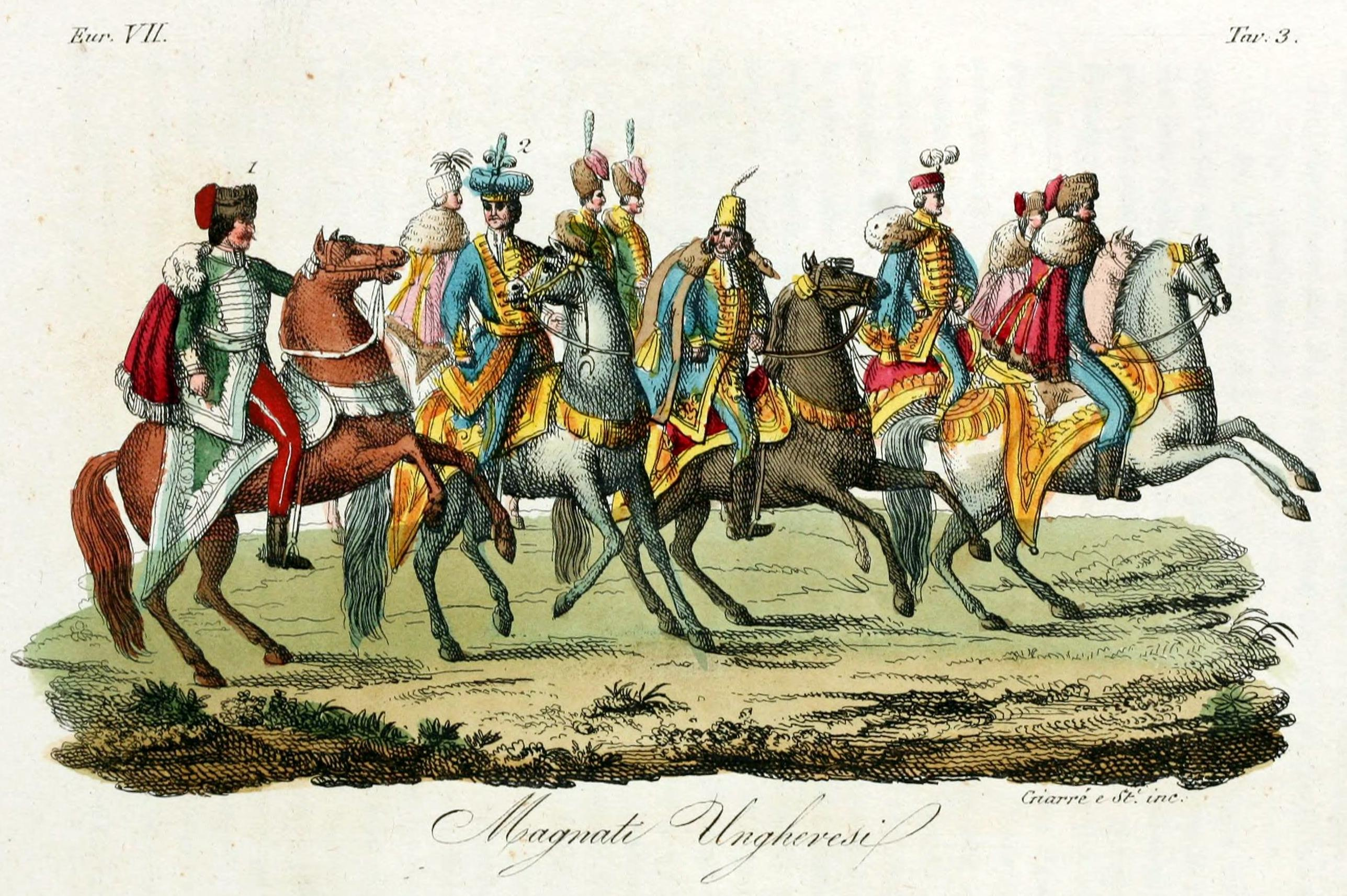
Hungarian nobles, circa 1831

Historically, the nobles in Europe became soldiers; the aristocracy in Europe can trace their origins to military leaders from the migration period and the Middle Ages. For many years, the British Army, together with the Church, was seen as the ideal career for the younger sons of the aristocracy. Although now much diminished, the practice has not totally disappeared. Such practices are not unique to the British either geographically or historically. As a very practical form of displaying patriotism, it has been at times fashionable for "gentlemen" to participate in the military.

The fundamental idea of gentry had come to be that of the essential superiority of the fighting man, usually maintained in the granting of arms. At the last, the wearing of a sword on all occasions was the outward and visible sign of a "gentleman"; the custom survives in the sword worn with "court dress". A suggestion that a gentleman must have a coat of arms was vigorously advanced by certain 19th- and 20th-century heraldists, notably Arthur Charles Fox-Davies in England and Thomas Innes of Learney in Scotland. The significance of a right to a coat of arms was that it was definitive proof of the status of gentleman, but it recognised rather than conferred such a status, and the status could be and frequently was accepted without a right to a coat of arms.

=== Chivalry ===
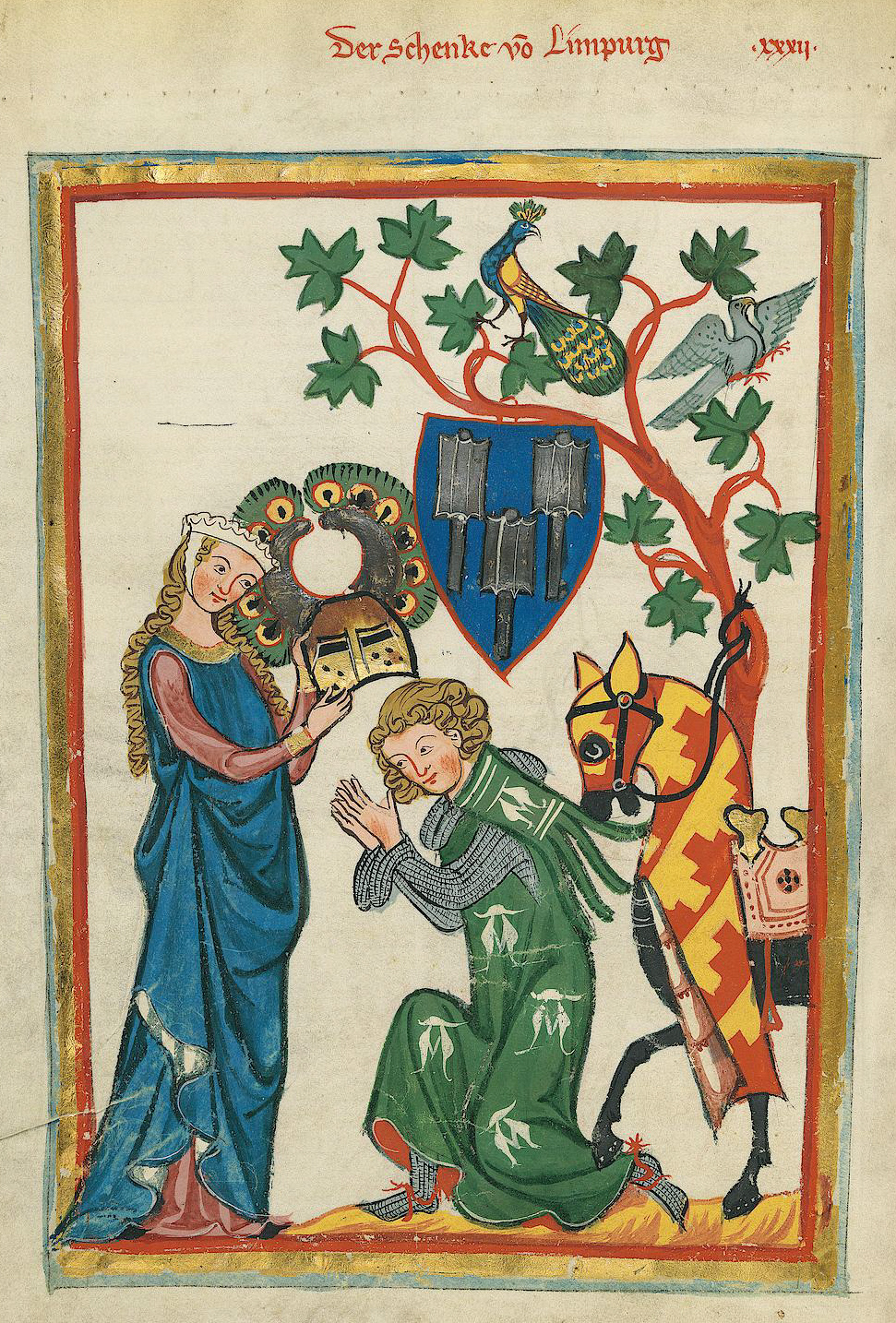
A knight being armed.

Chivalry (Note: Etymology: English from 1292, loans from French chevalerie "knighthood", from chevalier "knight" from Medieval Latin caballarius "horseman"; cavalry is from the Middle French form of the same word.) is a term related to the medieval institution of knighthood. It is usually associated with ideals of knightly virtues, honour and courtly love.

Christianity had a modifying influence on the virtues of chivalry, with limits placed on knights to protect and honour the weaker members of society and maintain peace. The church became more tolerant of war in the defence of faith, espousing theories of the just war. In the 11th century, the concept of a "knight of Christ" (miles Christi) gained currency in France, Spain and Italy. These concepts of "religious chivalry" were further elaborated in the era of the Crusades.

In the later Middle Ages, wealthy merchants strove to adopt chivalric attitudes. This was a democratisation of chivalry, leading to a new genre called the courtesy book, which were guides to the behaviour of "gentlemen".

When examining medieval literature, chivalry can be classified into three basic but overlapping areas:

1. Duties to countrymen and fellow Christians
2. Duties to God
3. Duties to women

These three areas obviously overlap quite frequently in chivalry and are often indistinguishable. Another classification of chivalry divides it into warrior, religious and courtly love strands. One particular similarity between all three of these categories is honour. Honour is the foundational and guiding principle of chivalry. Thus, for the knight, honour would be one of the guides of action.

=== Gentleman ===
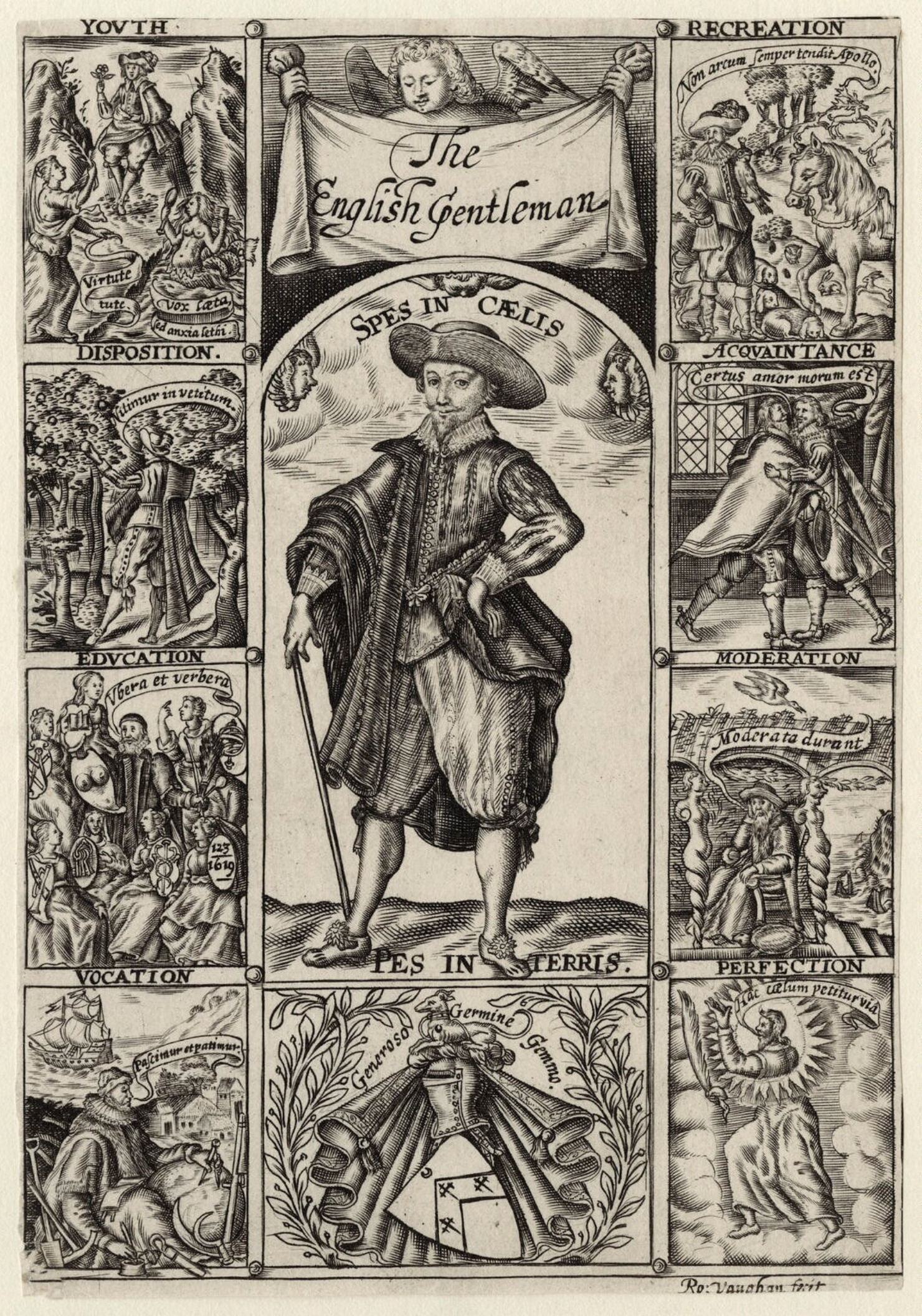
A page from Brathwait's book that displays the qualities associated with being a gentleman

The term gentleman (from Latin gentilis, belonging to a race or gens, and "man", cognate with the French word gentilhomme, the Spanish gentilhombre and the Italian gentil uomo or gentiluomo), in its original and strict signification, denoted a man of good family, analogous to the Latin generosus (its invariable translation in English-Latin documents). In this sense the word equates with the French gentilhomme ("nobleman"), which was in Great Britain long confined to the peerage. The term gentry (from the Old French genterise for gentelise) has much of the social-class significance of the French noblesse or of the German Adel, but without the strict technical requirements of those traditions (such as quarters of nobility). To a degree, gentleman signified a man with an income derived from landed property, a legacy or some other source and was thus independently wealthy and did not need to work.

=== Confucianism ===
The Far East also held similar ideas to the West of what a gentleman is, which are based on Confucian principles. The term Jūnzǐ (君子) is a term crucial to classical Confucianism. Literally meaning "son of a ruler", "prince" or "noble", the ideal of a "gentleman", "proper man", "exemplary person", or "perfect man" is that for which Confucianism exhorts all people to strive. A succinct description of the "perfect man" is one who "combine[s] the qualities of saint, scholar, and gentleman" (CE). A hereditary elitism was bound up with the concept, and gentlemen were expected to act as moral guides to the rest of society. They were to:

- cultivate themselves morally;
- participate in the correct performance of ritual;
- show filial piety and loyalty where these are due; and
- cultivate humaneness.

The opposite of the Jūnzǐ was the Xiǎorén (小人), literally "small person" or "petty person". Like English "small", the word in this context in Chinese can mean petty in mind and heart, narrowly self-interested, greedy, superficial, and materialistic.

=== Noblesse oblige ===
The idea of noblesse oblige, "nobility obliges", among gentry is, as the Oxford English Dictionary expresses, that the term "suggests noble ancestry constrains to honorable behaviour; privilege entails to responsibility". Being a noble meant that one had responsibilities to lead, manage and so on. One was not to simply spend one's time in idle pursuits.

== Heraldry ==
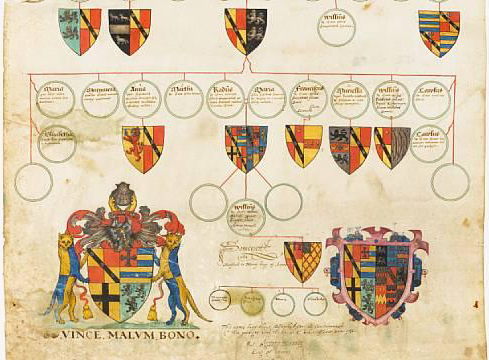
An example of an Elizabethan pedigree of the de Euro family of Northumberland, barons of Warkworth and Clavering. Scrivened, circa 1570 to 1588

A coat of arms is a heraldic device dating to the 12th century in Europe. It was originally a cloth tunic worn over or in place of armour to establish identity in battle. The coat of arms is drawn with heraldic rules for a person, family or organisation. Family coats of arms were originally derived from personal ones, which then became extended in time to the whole family. In Scotland, family coats of arms are still personal ones and are mainly used by the head of the family. In heraldry, a person entitled to a coat of arms is an armiger, and their family would be armigerous.

=== Ecclesiastical heraldry ===
Ecclesiastical heraldry is the tradition of heraldry developed by Christian clergy. Initially used to mark documents, ecclesiastical heraldry evolved as a system for identifying people and dioceses. It is most formalised within the Catholic Church, where most bishops, including the pope, have a personal coat of arms. Clergy in Anglican, Lutheran, Eastern Catholic and Orthodox churches follow similar customs.

== See also ==
- Aristocracy
- Bildungsbürgertum
- Cabang Atas
- Gentlewoman
- Grand Burgher
- Habitus
- Hanseaten
- Patrician (ancient Rome)
- Principalía
- Priyayi
- Redorer son blason
- Symbolic capital
- Yeoman
