= Ahsan Ali Taj =

Pakistani music composer, songwriter and singer

- Born: Ahsan Ali Taj; 23 November 1980 (age 45); Karachi, Sindh Province, Pakistan
- Genres: Pop/Rock/Fusion/Semi Classical/Films/Drama
- Occupations: Music Director & Creative Mentor
- Instrument: Keyboard instrument/Electronic keyboard/Synthesizer
- Years active: 2001 – present
- Labels: GEO, ARY, Hum TV, AnB Productions, 7th Sky, Six Sigma, GEO Adaptation, Master Mind, Evernew Entertainment, Media Master, Fars Productions, Showcase Productions, Ireland Productions UK, Endor Productions.
- Website: Ahsan Ali Taj Official

Ahsan Ali Taj is a Pakistani music composer, songwriter and singer. He started his music career in 2001 as a singer and music composer. He inherited musical instincts from his parents, his father was a classical, semi classical & Saraiki folk singer and his mother Nighat Seema, famous singer of 60s, 70s and onwards. His early training and musical understanding was initially developed by his parents but after sudden death of his mother this coaching stopped and he started his journey with some well-known professionals such as Music Director Niaz Ahmed Khan,< Producer Nizaar Lalani, Waqar Ali, Director & Executive Producer Ameer Imam.

== Career ==
His projects furnishing his music director figure were Kya Haath Laga Pathar Ban Kar. It was sung by Sanam Marvi, Lyrics were written by Tariq Jameel, telecasted at GEO TV. Drama Serial Hazaron Saal.

== Discography ==
DETAILS OF OSTs & Background Score
Year	Title	Singer / Role	Director	Media Production	Channel
2026	Bhanwar	Ali Tariq	Abu Aleeha	Alpha Productions	Express Entertainment
2024	Fana	Natasha Baig	Najaf Bilgrami	Green Entertainment	Green Entertainment
2024	Hona Tha Pyar	Zaryab Sultan	Yasir Nawaz	Farid Nawaz Productions	Aan TV
2023	Phir Say Nadaaniyan	Zaryab Sultan	Yasir Nawaz	Farid Nawaz Productions	Farid Nawaz Productions
2022	Raabte	Ali Tariq	Ahsan Ali Taj	ARY Digital	ARY ZAP
2020	Log Kya Kahenge	Ali Tariq	Mohsin Mirza	Drama Serial	ARY Digital
2019	Wrong No 2 Tu Hi Har Rang Men	Ali Tariq	Yasir Nawaz	Feature Film	Cinema
2019	Bharam	Ali Tariq	Meer Sikander Ali	Drama Serial	HUM TV
2018	Aatish	Ali Tariq	Saima Waseem	Drama	HUM TV
2017	Shikwa Nahin Kissi Se	Background Score	Irfan Aslam	Drama Serial	A Plus
2017	Khud Gharz	Background Score	Yasir Nawaz	Drama Serial	ARY Digital
2016	Betabi	Background Score, Song Mix and Master	Abdul Majid	Feature Film	Cinema
2016	Wrong Number	Musical Scoring & Song Composition	Yasir Nawaz	Feature Film	Cinema
2016	Aap ki Kaneez	OST	Aamir Yousuf	Drama	GEO Entertainment
2015	Saadat Hassan Manto	Background Music	Sarmad Khusat	Drama	GEO Entertainment
2015	Bikhra Mera Naseeb	OST	Furqan Khan	Drama	GEO Entertainment
2015	Drama Sultanate Dil	Song Composition	Usama	Drama	GEO Entertainment
2015	Piya Man Bhaye	OST	Faizan	Drama	GEO Entertainment
2015	Marium	Background Music	Usama	Drama	GEO Entertainment
2015	Mera Yahan Koi Nahi	OST	Raamesh	Drama	GEO Entertainment
2015	Drama Sultanate Dil	Song Composition	Usama	Drama	GEO Entertainment
2015	Karachi Se Lahore	Musical Scoring	Wajahat Rauf	Feature Film	Cinema
2013	Aina	Musical Scoring	Sarmad Khoosat	Tele Film	GEO TV, PTV World
2013	Armaan	Musical Scoring	Anjum Shehzad	Tele Film	GEO TV, PTV World
2013	Tarang Anjuman	Musical Scoring	Yasir Nawaz	Tele Film	GEO TV, PTV World
2013	Mirat-ul-Uroos	Musical Scoring	Anjum Shehzad	Drama	GEO Entertainment
2012	PTCL Wingle Service	Music Composed	Ahmed Channa	TVC	All Channels
2012	Saat Pardon Mein	Musical Scoring	Yasir Nawaz	Drama	GEO Entertainment
2012	Ashk	Musical Scoring	Sarmad Khoosat	Drama	GEO Entertainment
2012	Sirf Ladki nahi mein	OST	Naved Jaffery	Drama	GEO Entertainment
2012	Kya Haath laga Pathar Ban kar	OST	Mohib Mirza	Drama	GEO Entertainment
2012	Ghaata	Background Music	Sherzade	Tele Film	GEO Entertainment
2012	Nestle Bhaag Amina Bhaag	OST & Background Music	Yasir Nawaz	Tele Film	GEO Entertainment
2012	LamhaLamhaZindagi	Background Music	Shahid	Drama	ARY Digital
2012	Tere Bina	Background Music	Abdullah Badini	Drama Serial	PTV World
2012	Men Abdul Qadir Hoon	Background Music	Baber Javed	Drama Serial	Hum TV
2012	Tarang Hi Tarang Hai	Title Music	Baber Javed	Ad Film	Hum TV
2012	Sharatein	Title Music	Yasir Nawaz	Drama / Telefilm	GEO TV
2012	Tumhein Kuch Yaad He Jana	Title Music	Dilawer	Drama	GEO TV
