= Kinza Razzak =

Pakistani television actress

- کنزا رزاق
- Born: Kinza Razzak; 27 November 1992 (age 33); Lahore, Punjab, Pakistan
- Occupations: Actress; Model
- Years active: 2017 – present

Kinza Razzak (born 27 November 1992) is a Pakistani television actress and model. She has appeared in several television serials, telefilms and advertisements. She is known for her role as Captain Amber in the women's cricket drama serial 22 Qadam (2023) and as the titular Dilara in Dilara (2018), both of which earned her critical praise.

== Filmography ==
=== Television series ===
Year	Title	Role	Notes	Refs
2017	Shayad	Taniya	Geo TV	
2018	Dilara	Dil Aara	BOL Entertainment	
2018	Bewaja	Saman	PTV	
2020	Log Kya Kahenge	Kiran	ARY Digital	
2022	Fraud	Zimra	ARY Digital	
2022	Qalandar	Shafaq	Geo Entertainment	
2023	22 Qadam	Amber Akhtar	Green Entertainment	
2024	Dil-e-Nadan	Tanya	Geo Entertainment	

=== Web series ===
Year	Title	Role	Network
2020	Ek Jhoothi Love Story	Natalia	ZEE5
2022	Mind Games	Angeline	
