= 22 Qadam =

2023 Pakistani sports drama television series

- Genre: Sports drama
- Written by: Zeeshan Ilyas
- Directed by: Anjum Shahzad
- Starring: Hareem Farooq; Wahaj Ali; Kinza Razzak
- Country of origin: Pakistan
- Original language: Urdu
- No. of seasons: 1
- No. of episodes: 23

Production
- Producers: Imran Raza Kazmi; Hareem Farooq
- Cinematography: Ehsan Ali Khan
- Editor: Fareed Haqqani
- Production companies: IRK Films; Multiverse Entertainment

Original release
- Network: Green Entertainment
- Release: 15 July 2023 – 21 January 2024

22 Qadam (transl. 22 Steps) is a Pakistani sports drama television series based on the topic of women cricket. It is directed by Anjum Shahzad and produced by Imran Raza Kazmi and Hareem Farooq. The series stars Hareem Farooq, Wahaj Ali and Kinza Razzak. It premiered on Green Entertainment on 15 July 2023.

== Premise ==
The series follows a young woman who aspires to become a professional cricketer and represent Pakistan. Her ambition brings her into conflict with social expectations and the obstacles faced by women pursuing careers in sports.

== Cast ==
- Hareem Farooq as Farheen "Fari" Akhtar
- Wahaj Ali as Junaid Malik
- Kinza Razzak as Amber Akhtar
- Alina Abbas Shah as Naz Kiryana
- Saleem Mairaj as Coach Qasim
- Nida Mumtaz as Khalida
- Dur-e-Nayab as Liza
- Muhammad Usman Malik as Murtaza
- Muhammad Abdullah Zaman as Bobby
- Shahnawaz Zaidi

== Reception ==
Dunya News included 22 Qadam in its review of Pakistani television dramas from 2023, highlighting its cricket-centred storyline and the performance of Hareem Farooq.
