= Log Kya Kahenge =

Log Kya Kahenge (lit. "what will people say") is a colloquialism in Hindi and Urdu used in South Asia to indicate fear of societal judgement on one's personal life choices.

Log Kya Kahenge or Log Kia Kahenge may also refer to:

- Log Kya Kahenge (film), a 1982 Indian Bollywood film
- Log Kya Kahenge (2019 TV series), a 2019 Pakistani television soap opera
- Log Kya Kahenge (2020 TV series), a 2020 Pakistani television series
