= Nighat Seema =

Pakistani singer

- نگہت سیما
- Born: 18 July 1946; Ajmer, British India
- Died: 4 April 2006 (aged 59); Karachi, Pakistan
- Occupations: Singer of Ghazal; Film playback singing
- Years active: 1964 - 2006
- Spouse: Taj Multani (husband)
- Children: Ahsan Ali Taj (son); Sana Ali (daughter)

Nighat Seema (18 July 1946 - 4 April 2006) was a Pakistani radio and film singer during the era of 60s and 70s. She is known for singing semi-classical songs, ghazals, and playback singing. She was the mother of music composer Ahsan Ali Taj.

== Early life and family ==
Seema was born in Ajmer. She belonged to a Bengali family that had settled in Karachi.

== Singing career ==
Seema was a radio singer who used to sing at different radio stations of East and West Pakistan. She got her musical training from the classical singer Tufail Niazi. Her career as a playback singer started with film Chhoti Behan that was released in 1964. She sang solo songs and also duets with Irene Perveen, Ahmed Rushdi, and Masood Rana for 37 Urdu and Punjabi movies.

Seema recorded many semi-classical songs, ghazals, patriotic songs, and Kalam-e-Iqbal for Radio Pakistan and Pakistan Television. Besides Urdu and Punjabi songs, she also vocalized songs in Bengali, Sindhi and Pashto languages.

== Personal life ==
Seema was married to the folk singer Taj Multani who died in 2018. They both had a daughter named Sana Ali and a son named Ahsan Ali Taj who also adopted the singing career.

== Death ==
Seema died on 4 April 2006 in Karachi. She was laid to rest in Wadi e Hussain Cemetery in Karachi.

== Popular songs ==
=== Film ===
- 1964 (Film: Chhoti Behan - Urdu) ... Ashkon Kay Diye, Sadqay Tujh Peh A Chand, Music: Lal Mohammad Iqbal, Poet: Sehba Akhtar,
- 1964 (Film: Chhoti Behan - Urdu) ... Geet Gati Hayn Khawabon Ki Parchhaian, Pyar Lenay Lag Phir Say, Singer(s): Nighat Seema, Masood Rana, Music: Lal Mohammad Iqbal, Poet: Masroor Anwar
- 1964 (Film: Chhoti Behan - Urdu) ... Kali Hasraton Ki Na Khil Saki, Tera Pyar Ras Na Aa Saka, Singer(s): Nighat Seema, Masood Rana, Music: Lal Mohammad Iqbal, Poet: Masroor Anwar
- 1968 (Film: Mahal - Urdu) ... Awaz Jab Bhi Den Ham, Pehchan Jayie Ga, Singer(s): Mehdi Hassan, Nighat Seema, Music: Rasheed Attray, Poet: Fyaz Hashmi
- 1970 (Film: Jalay Na Kyun Parvana - Urdu) ... Jab Bhi Tumharay Husn Kay Jalway Bikhar Geye, Singer(s): Ahmad Rushdi, Nighat Seema, Music: Nashad, Poet: Taslim Fazli
- 1971 (Film: Afshan - Urdu) ... Mili Hay Aaj Zamanay Ki Har Khushi Mujh Ko, Singer(s): Ahmad Rushdi, Nighat Seema, Music: Nashad, Poet: Taslim Fazli

=== Radio ===
- Wo Keh Gaye Thay Keh Aaen Gey Hum, Poet: Innam Bakhsh Nasikh
- Baat Karni Mujhe Mushkil Kabhi Aisi To Na Thi, Poet: Bahadur Shah Zafar
- Wo Harfe Raaz Keh Sikha Gaya Hai Mujh Ko Junoon, Poet: Allama Muhammad Iqbal
- Tu Abhi Reh Guzar Mein Hai Qaid e Maqam Se Guzar, Poet: Allama Muhammad Iqbal

=== Television ===
- Ye Kavita Pakistani Hai
