= Redorer son blason =

Redorer son blason (literally "to re-gild one's coat of arms") was a social practice taking place in France before the French Revolution, whereby a poor aristocratic family married a daughter to a rich commoner. This enabled the aristocratic family to recover financially through the hefty bride price usually asked from the commoner. On the other hand, the commoner was allowed to add the aristocratic name of his bride (with the nobiliary particle "de") to his own family name, and this was dearly sought.

This social practice was frowned upon by aristocratic families less in need, who looked with contempt or pity at the aristocratic families that had to re-gild their coat of arms. They called such an alliance with a commoner a mésalliance ("misalliance, marriage beneath one's station"), and the practice was often called déchoir ("to fall from rank") or salir son blason ("to dirty one's coat of arms"). As in most of Europe, noble children who married commoners would lose their noble status and take on that of their spouses. In the worst-case scenario, if the poor aristocratic family died out with no other heir than the daughter married to the commoner, the family was said to "fall into commonalty" (tomber en roture).

As the French economy underwent drastic changes after the Middle Ages, many aristocratic families lost their position of power and wealth, and ended up in poverty. For those aristocratic families from the provinces and far from Paris, far away from power and its associated gratifications, redorer son blason was often the only way to remain afloat. This was usually a step taken in the last extremity, often seen as shameful and degrading. However, in a few cases, redorer son blason could also be prestigious, such as was the case for the aristocratic families who married daughters with members of the Colbert family.

== Modern usage ==
Today in France, the phrase is still used, but in a different context, meaning "to regain prestige" or "to improve one's image". An example of this contemporary usage in French newspapers is the Le Point headline: "Les maires FN veulent redorer leur blason".

== See also ==
- French nobility
- Arranged marriage
