= Log Kya Kahenge (2020 TV series) =

2020 Pakistani TV series

- Title Screen
- Genre: Drama; Emotional
- Written by: Soofia Khurram
- Directed by: Mohsin Mirza
- Starring: Faysal Qureshi; Aijaz Aslam; Saheefa Jabbar Khattak; Sakina Samo; Kinza Razzak
- Theme music composer: Ahsan Ali Taj
- Opening theme: "Mere Khuda" by Ali Tariq
- Country of origin: Pakistan
- Original language: Urdu
- No. of seasons: 1
- No. of episodes: 31

Production
- Producer: Abdullah Seja
- Camera setup: Multi-camera setup
- Running time: 35-40 minutes
- Production company: Idream Entertainment

Original release
- Network: ARY Digital
- Release: 25 July 2020 – 11 March 2021

Log Kya Kahenge (Urdu: لوگ کیا کہیں گے, lit. 'What Will People Say') is a Pakistani television series premiered on 25 July 2020 on ARY Digital replacing Jhooti. It is produced by Abdullah Seja under their banner iDream Entertainment. It stars Faysal Qureshi and Saheefa Jabbar Khattak. The supporting cast include Aijaz Aslam, Sakina Samo and Kinza Razzak among others.

== Cast ==
- Faysal Qureshi as Saad
- Aijaz Aslam as Haseeb (Dead)
- Saheefa Jabbar Khattak as Meerab
- Sakina Samo as Sajida; Haseeb's mother
- Humaira Zaheer as Aabi
- Kinza Razzak as Kiran; Saad's wife
- Furqan Qureshi as Haroon
- Zarmeena Ikram as Anum; Tariq's wife
- Afshan Qureshi as Tabbasum; Haroon's mother
- Anoosheh Rania Khan as Dania
- Tipu Sharif as Tariq; Meerab's brother
- Salma Qadir as Tabbasum's friend
- Kamran Jilani as Hamza Ikram
- Aslam Shahed
- Zuhab Khan as Rahim (Older)

== Reception ==
=== Ratings ===
Episode	Broadcast date	Weekly rank (in ratings)	Television Rating Points (TRP)	YouTube viewership (in millions)(in viewership)
1	25 July 2020	1	5.80	3
2	8 August 2020	1	3.70	2.5
13	15 August 2020	15	4.70	2
14	22 August 2020	1	5.00	1.5
5	5 September 2020	1	5.60	1

After 5 Episodes Ratings start falling and beaten by HumTV's Mushk due to this channel changed its slot and ratings increased slowly.

=== Awards and nominations ===
Date of ceremony	Award	Category	Recipient(s) and nominee(s)	Result	References
March 2021	ARY People's Choice Awards	Favorite Director	Mohsin Mirza	Nominated	
March 2021	ARY People's Choice Awards	Favorite Actor	Faysal Qureshi	Nominated	
March 2021	ARY People's Choice Awards	Favorite Actor in a role of Baap	Faysal Qureshi	Nominated	
March 2021	ARY People's Choice Awards	Favorite Actor in a role of Behtreen Dost	Faysal Qureshi	Won	

== Soundtrack ==
Log Kya Kahenge - OST

Soundtrack album by Ali Tariq
- Released: 19 July 2020
- Recorded: 2020
- Genre: Television soundtrack
- Length: (3:21)
- Language: Urdu
- Label: ARY Digital

Music video
- "Log Kya Kahenge" OST on YouTube

The title song is sung by Ali Tariq. The music was composed by Ahsan Ali Taj and the lyrics were also written by Ahsan Ali Taj.
