= Bhanwar =

Bhanwar may refer to:

- Bhanwar (film), a 1976 Indian film
- Bhanwar (1998 TV series), an Indian television docudrama series
- Bhanwar (2020 TV series), an Indian sci-fi thriller series
